= List of conflicts in Asia =

This is a list of conflicts in Asia arranged by country, including wars between Asian nations, civil wars, and wars involving non-Asian nations that took place within Asia. It encompasses pre-colonial wars, colonial wars, wars of independence, secessionist and separatist conflicts, major episodes of national violence (riots, massacres, etc.), and global conflicts in which Asia was a theatre of war.

== Central Asia ==
=== Kazakhstan ===
- 622–750 Early Muslim conquests
  - 673–751 Muslim conquest of Transoxiana
- 1206–1368 Mongol invasions and conquests
  - 1209–1236 Mongol campaigns in Central Asia
    - 1219–1221 Mongol invasion of the Khwarazmian Empire
- 1260–1294 Division of the Mongol Empire
  - 1260–1264 Toluid Civil War
    - 1262 Berke–Hulagu war
  - 1268–1301 Kaidu–Kublai war
- 1314–1318 Esen Buqa–Ayurbarwada war
- 1468–1500 Kazakh War of Independence
- 1508 Kazakh-Nogai War (1508)
- 1522–1538 First Kazakh Khanate Civil War
- 1577 Kazakh-Nogai War (1577)
- 1598–1599 Kazakh invasion of Northern Bukhara
- 1603–1605 Karakalpak rebellion (1603–1605)
- 1643–1756 Kazakh–Dzungar Wars
- 1717–1895 Russian conquest of Central Asia
  - 1837–1847 Kenesary's Rebellion
  - 1839–1840 Khivan campaign of 1839–1840
  - 1873 Khivan campaign of 1873
- 1870 Adai rebellion
- 1914–1918 World War I
  - 1914–1918 Asian and Pacific theatre of World War I
    - 1916–1917 Central Asian revolt of 1916
- 1917–1922 Russian Civil War
  - 1916–1934 Central Asian Front of the Russian Civil War
    - 1916–1934 Basmachi movement
- 1951 1951 anti-Chechen pogrom in Kazakhstan
- 1954 Kengir uprising
- 1986 Jeltoqsan
- 1989–present Kazakh–Russian ethnic conflicts
- 2020 2020 Dungan–Kazakh ethnic clashes

=== Kyrgyzstan ===
- 622–750 Early Muslim conquests
  - 673–751 Muslim conquest of Transoxiana
- 1206–1368 Mongol invasions and conquests
  - 1209–1236 Mongol campaigns in Central Asia
    - 1218 Mongol conquest of the Qara Khitai
- 1260–1294 Division of the Mongol Empire
  - 1260–1264 Toluid Civil War
    - 1262 Berke–Hulagu war
  - 1268–1301 Kaidu–Kublai war
- 1314–1318 Esen Buqa–Ayurbarwada war
- 1717–1895 Russian conquest of Central Asia
- 1914–1918 World War I
  - 1914–1918 Asian and Pacific theatre of World War I
    - 1916–1917 Central Asian revolt of 1916
- 1916–1934 Basmachi movement
- 1990 1990 Osh clashes
- 1999 Batken Conflict
- 2010 2010 South Kyrgyzstan ethnic clashes
- 2021 2021 Kyrgyzstan–Tajikistan clashes
- 2022 2022 Kyrgyzstan–Tajikistan clashes

=== Tajikistan ===
- 336–323 BC Wars of Alexander the Great
- 104–101 BC War of the Heavenly Horses
- 622–750 Early Muslim conquests
  - 673–751 Muslim conquest of Transoxiana
- 1260–1294 Division of the Mongol Empire
  - 1260–1264 Toluid Civil War
    - 1262 Berke–Hulagu war
  - 1268–1301 Kaidu–Kublai war
- 1314–1318 Esen Buqa–Ayurbarwada war
- 1914–1918 World War I
  - 1914–1918 Asian and Pacific theatre of World War I
    - 1916–1917 Central Asian revolt of 1916
- 1917–1922 Russian Civil War
  - 1916–1934 Central Asian Front of the Russian Civil War
    - 1916–1934 Basmachi movement
- 1979–1989 Soviet–Afghan War
- 1992–1997 Tajikistani Civil War
- 2010–2015 Insurgency in Gorno-Badakhshan (2010–2015)
  - 2012 2012 Gorno-Badakhshan clashes
- 2021 2021 Kyrgyzstan–Tajikistan clashes
- 2022 2022 Kyrgyzstan–Tajikistan clashes

=== Turkmenistan ===
- 622–750 Early Muslim conquests
  - 633–651 Muslim conquest of Persia
    - 651–654 Muslim conquest of Khorasan
- 1040 Battle of Dandanaqan
- 1206–1368 Mongol invasions and conquests
  - 1209–1236 Mongol campaigns in Central Asia
    - 1219–1221 Mongol invasion of the Khwarazmian Empire
- 1260–1294 Division of the Mongol Empire
  - 1260–1264 Toluid Civil War
    - 1262 Berke–Hulagu war
  - 1268–1301 Kaidu–Kublai war
- 1314–1318 Esen Buqa–Ayurbarwada war
- 1717–1895 Russian conquest of Central Asia
  - 1885 Panjdeh incident
- 1917–1922 Russian Civil War
  - 1916–1934 Central Asian Front of the Russian Civil War
    - 1916–1934 Basmachi movement
    - 1917–1924 Khivan Revolution
- 1979–1989 Soviet–Afghan War

=== Uzbekistan ===
- 335–323 BC Wars of Alexander the Great
- 622–750 Early Muslim conquests
  - 673–751 Muslim conquest of Transoxiana
- 5th–7th centuries Hephthalite–Sasanian Wars
  - 614–616 Hephthalite–Gokturk raids of 614–616
- 583–603 Göktürk civil war
- 640–712 Tang campaigns against the Western Turks
  - 657 Conquest of the Western Turks
- 1206–1368 Mongol invasions and conquests
  - 1209–1236 Mongol campaigns in Central Asia
    - 1219–1221 Mongol invasion of the Khwarazmian Empire
- 1260–1294 Division of the Mongol Empire
  - 1260–1264 Toluid Civil War
    - 1262 Berke–Hulagu war
  - 1268–1301 Kaidu–Kublai war
- 1314–1318 Esen Buqa–Ayurbarwada war
- 1502–1788 Persian–Uzbek wars
  - 1510 Battle of Merv
  - 1512 Battle of Ghazdewan
- 1717–1895 Russian conquest of Central Asia
- 1720s–1747 Campaigns of Nader Shah
  - 1737–1740 Nader Shah's Central Asian campaign
- 1855–1856 Karakalpak rebellion (1855–1856)
- 1917–1922 Russian Civil War
  - 1916–1934 Central Asian Front of the Russian Civil War
    - 1916–1934 Basmachi movement
    - 1917–1925 Bukharan Revolution
    - 1917–1924 Khivan Revolution
- 1917–1922 Russian Civil War
  - 1916–1934 Central Asian Front of the Russian Civil War
    - 1916–1934 Basmachi movement
- 1979–1989 Soviet–Afghan War

== East Asia ==
=== China ===
==== Longshan culture ====
- c. 2500 BC Battle of Banquan
- c. 2500 BC Battle of Zhuolu

==== Xia dynasty ====
- c. 1600 BC Battle of Mingtiao

==== Shang dynasty ====
- c. 1046 BC Battle of Muye

==== Zhou dynasty ====
- c. 1042 BC – c. 1039 BC Rebellion of the Three Guards
- 860 BC Qi coup d'état of 860 BC
- 771–476 BC Spring and Autumn period
  - 771 BC Battle of Mount Li
  - 707 BC Battle of Xuge
  - 685 BC Battle of Qianshi
  - 684 BC Battle of Changshao
  - 657–651 BC Li Ji Unrest
  - 632 BC Battle of Chengpu
  - 627 BC Battle of Xiao
  - 595 BC Battle of Bi
  - 588 BC Battle of An
  - 575 BC Battle of Yanling
  - 506 BC Battle of Boju
  - 4th century BC Gojoseon–Yan War
  - 481–379 BC Usurpation of Qi by Tian
  - 478 BC Battle of Lize
- 475–221 BC Warring States period
  - 453 BC Battle of Jinyang
  - 353 BC Battle of Guiling
  - 342 BC Battle of Maling
  - 301 BC Battle of Chuisha
  - 293 BC Battle of Yique
  - 265 BC Zhao–Xiongnu War
  - 260 BC Battle of Changping
  - 259–257 BC Battle of Handan
  - 230–221 BC Qin's wars of unification

==== Qin dynasty ====
- 215 BC Qin's campaign against the Xiongnu
- 214 BC Qin's campaign against the Yue tribes
- 209–208 BC Chen Sheng and Wu Guang uprising

==== Han dynasty ====
- 206–202 BC Chu–Han Contention
- 154 BC Rebellion of the Seven States
- 133 BC – 91 AD Han–Xiongnu War
- 2nd century BC Southward expansion of the Han dynasty
  - 138–111 BC Han campaigns against Minyue
  - 111 BC Han conquest of Nanyue
  - 135–109 BC Han conquest of Dian
  - 40–43 Trung sisters' rebellion
- 109–108 BC Han-Gojoseon War
- 17–25 Lulin Rebellion
- 18–27 Red Eyebrows Rebellion
- 172 Battle of Jwawon
- 189–220 End of the Han dynasty
  - 184 Yellow Turban Rebellion
  - 184–189 Liang Province rebellion
  - 189 Massacre of the Eunuchs
  - 190 Campaign against Dong Zhuo
  - 191 Battle of Yangcheng
  - 191 Battle of Jieqiao
  - 191 Battle of Xiangyang (191)
  - 192 Battle of Chang'an
  - 193 Battle of Fengqiu
  - 193–194 Cao Cao's invasion of Xu Province
  - 194 Battle of Yan Province
  - 194 Sun Ce's conquests in Jiangdong
  - 197–199 War between Cao Cao and Zhang Xiu
  - 198 Battle of Xiapi
  - 199 Battle of Yijing
  - 199 Campaign against Yuan Shu
  - 200 Battle of Guandu
  - 202 Battle of Bowang
  - 202–203 Battle of Liyang
  - 203 Battle of Xiakou
  - 204 Battle of Ye
  - 205 Battle of Nanpi
  - 207 Battle of White Wolf Mountain
  - 208 Battle of Jiangxia
  - 208 Battle of Red Cliffs
  - 211 Battle of Tong Pass (211)
  - 213 Siege of Jicheng
  - 213 Battle of Lucheng
  - 213–214 Liu Bei's takeover of Yi Province
  - 213 Battle of Ruxu (213)
  - 214 Battle of Qi Mountains
  - 214–215 Battle of Xiaoyao Ford
  - 215 Battle of Baxi
  - 215 Battle of Yangping
  - 215 Sun–Liu territorial dispute
  - 215–216 Battle of Ba
  - 217 Battle of Ruxu (217)
  - 217–219 Hanzhong Campaign
  - 219 Battle of Fancheng
  - 219 Lü Meng's invasion of Jing Province

==== Wei dynasty ====
- 220–280 Three Kingdoms
  - 222 Battle of Xiaoting
  - 222–225 Cao Pi's invasions of Eastern Wu
  - 225 Zhuge Liang's Southern Campaign
  - 228–234 Zhuge Liang's Northern Expeditions
  - 227–228 Xincheng Rebellion
  - 228 Battle of Shiting
  - 230 Ziwu Campaign
  - 231 Battle of Hefei (231)
  - 233 Battle of Hefei (233)
  - 234 Battle of Hefei (234)
  - 238 Sima Yi's Liaodong campaign
  - 240–262 Jiang Wei's Northern Expeditions
  - 241 Battle of Fancheng (241)
  - 241 Battle of Quebei
  - 244 Battle of Xingshi
  - 244–245 Goguryeo–Wei War
  - 247–262 Jiang Wei's Northern Expeditions
  - 249 Incident at the Gaoping Tombs
  - 251–258 Three Rebellions in Shouchun
    - 251 Wang Ling's Rebellion
    - 255 Guanqiu Jian and Wen Qin's Rebellion
    - 257–258 Zhuge Dan's Rebellion
  - 253 Battle of Dongxing
  - 253 Battle of Hefei (253)
  - 260 Sima Zhao's regicide of Cao Mao
  - 263–271 Jiao Province Campaign
  - 263 Conquest of Shu by Wei
  - 264 Zhong Hui's Rebellion
  - 264 Siege of Yong'an

==== Jìn dynasty ====
- 220–280 Three Kingdoms
  - 270–280 Tufa Shujineng's Rebellion
  - 272–273 Battle of Xiling
  - 280 Conquest of Wu by Jin
- 291 War of the Eight Princes
- 304–439 Sixteen Kingdoms
  - 304–316 Upheaval of the Five Barbarians
  - 319–407 Goguryeo–Yan Wars
  - 350–351 Battle of Xiangguo (350–351)
  - 352 Battle of Liantai
  - 354 Huan Wen's expeditions
  - 383 Battle of Fei River
  - 395 Battle of Canhe Slope
  - 409–416 Liu Yu's Northern Expeditions

==== Liu Song dynasty ====
- 507 Battle of Zhongli
- 537 Battle of Shayuan

==== Sui dynasty ====
- 581–602 Sui-Turkic war
- 598–614 Goguryeo–Sui War
- 602 Sui–Early Lý War
- 617–621 Transition from Sui to Tang

==== Tang dynasty ====
- 626 Xuanwu Gate Incident
- 629–630 Tang campaign against the Eastern Turks
- 640–657 Emperor Taizong's campaign against the Western Regions
  - 640 Conquest of Karakhoja
  - 644–648 Conquest of Karasahr
  - 648–649 Conquest of Kucha
- 638 Tibetan attack on Songzhou
- 645–668 Goguryeo–Tang War
- 670 Battle of Dafei River
- 698 Battle of Tianmenling
- 7th–8th century Muslim conquest of Transoxiana
- 711 Battle of Bolchu
- 750–754 Tianbao War
- 755–763 An Lushan Rebellion
- 794 Battle of Shenchuan
- 835 Sweet Dew incident
- 874–884 Huang Chao Rebellion
- 884–923 Later Liang–Jin War
- 897 Battle of Qingkou

==== Five Dynasties and Ten Kingdoms period ====
- 907–979 Five Dynasties and Ten Kingdoms period
  - 909 Battle of Jisu
  - 919 Battle of Langshan Jiang
  - 945–947 Southern Tang conquest of Min
  - 955–958 Later Zhou conquest of Huainan
- 960 Chenqiao mutiny

==== Song dynasty ====
- 964–965 Song conquest of Later Shu
- 970–971 Song conquest of Southern Han
- 982–1119 Song–Xia wars
  - 982–1004 Li Jiqian's rebellion
  - 1040–1044 Yuanhao's invasion (1040–1044)
  - 1064–1067 Yizong raids
  - 1081–1085 Shenzong's invasion (1081–1085)
  - 1097–1098 Advance and fortify
  - 1103–1106 Song annexation of Tsongkha
  - 1113–1119 Huizong's invasion (1113–1119)
- 1042–1052 Nong Zhigao rebellions
- 1075–1077 Song–Đại Việt war
- 1125–1234 Jin–Song Wars
- 1206–1368 Mongol invasions and conquests
  - 1205–1279 Mongol conquest of China
    - 1205–1227 Mongol conquest of Western Xia
    - 1217–1233 Mongol conquest of Eastern Xia
    - 1235–1279 Mongol conquest of the Song dynasty

==== Liao dynasty ====
- 979 Battle of Gaoliang River

==== Jin dynasty ====
- 1206–1368 Mongol invasions and conquests
  - 1205–1279 Mongol conquest of China
    - 1211–1234 Mongol conquest of the Jin dynasty

==== Yuan dynasty ====
- 1206–1368 Mongol invasions and conquests
  - 1201–1308 Mongol conquest of Siberia
  - 1205–1279 Mongol conquest of China
    - 1205–1227 Mongol conquest of Western Xia
    - 1211–1234 Mongol conquest of the Jin dynasty
    - 1217–1233 Mongol conquest of Eastern Xia
    - 1235–1279 Mongol conquest of the Song dynasty
- 1351 Red Turban Rebellion
- 1357–1366 Ispah rebellion

==== Ming dynasty ====
- 1378–1385 Wu Mian rebellion
- 1381–1382 Ming conquest of Yunnan
- 1386–1388 Ming–Mong Mao War (1386–1388)
- 1387 Ming campaign against the Uriankhai
- 1388 Battle of Buir Lake
- 14th–15th century Miao rebellions in the Ming dynasty
- 1397 Lin Kuan rebellion
- 1397–1398 Dao Ganmeng rebellion
- 1399–1402 Jingnan Campaign
- 15th–16th century Ming–Turpan conflict
- 1409 Battle of Kherlen
- 1425 Zhu Gaoxu rebellion
- 1436–1449 Luchuan–Pingmian campaigns
- 1448–1449 Deng Maoqi rebellion
- 1449 Tumu Crisis
- 1449 Defense of Beijing
- 1461 Rebellion of Cao Qin
- 1510–1512 Rebellion of 1510
- 1510 Prince of Anhua rebellion
- 1519 Prince of Ning rebellion
- 1523 Ningbo incident
- 1540s–1567 Jiajing wokou raids
- 1542 Palace plot of Renyin year
- 1583–1619 Jurchen unification
- 1590–1600 Bozhou rebellion
- 1592 Ordos campaign (1592)
- 1618–1683 Transition from Ming to Qing
  - 1621–1629 She–An Rebellion
  - 1628–1644 Late Ming peasant rebellions
- 1642 Battle of Nanyang

==== Qing dynasty ====
- 1652–1689 Sino–Russian border conflicts
- 1673–1681 Revolt of the Three Feudatories
- 1678–1680 Dzungar conquest of Altishahr
- 1679–1684 Tibet–Ladakh–Mughal war
- 1687–1758 Dzungar–Qing Wars
  - 1715–1720 Second Dzungar-Qing War
- 1701 Battle of Dartsedo
- 1735–1736 Miao Rebellion (1735–1736)
- 1739 Coup of Hongxi
- 1747–1792 Ten Great Campaigns
  - 1755 First campaign against the Dzungars
  - 1756–1758 Second campaign against the Dzungars
  - 1757–1759 Revolt of the Altishahr Khojas
  - 1758–1759 Pacification of Xinjiang
  - 1747–1776 Jinchuan campaigns
    - 1747–1749 First campaign against the Jinchuan
    - 1771–1776 Second campaign against the Jinchuan
- 1759–1866 Afaqi Khoja revolts
- 1765–1769 Sino-Burmese War
- 1781 Jahriyya revolt
- 1788–1792 Sino-Nepalese War
- 1795–1806 Miao Rebellion (1795–1806)
- 1796–1804 White Lotus Rebellion
- 1813 Eight Trigrams uprising of 1813
- 1839–1842 First Opium War
- 1841–1842 Dogra–Tibetan war
- 1849 Battle of Tysami
- 1851–1864 Taiping Rebellion
- 1854–1949 Yangtze Patrol
- 1854–1856 Red Turban Rebellion (1854–1856)
- 1854–1873 Miao Rebellion (1854–1873)
- 1855–1867 Punti-Hakka Clan Wars
- 1855–1856 Nepal–Tibet War (1855–1856)
- 1855 Battle of the Leotung
- 1856–1873 Panthay Rebellion
- 1857 Ningpo massacre
- 1861 Xinyou Coup
- 1862–1877 Dungan Revolt (1862–1877)
- 1864–1869 Nian Rebellion
- 1856–1860 Second Opium War
- 1884–1885 Franco-Chinese War
- 1891 Jindandao incident
- 1894–1895 First Sino-Japanese War
- 1895–1896 Dungan Revolt (1895)
- 1899–1901 Boxer Rebellion
- 1904–1905 Russo-Japanese War
- 1905 Batang uprising
- 1910 Chinese expedition to Tibet (1910)
- 1911 Second Guangzhou Uprising
- 1911–1912 1911 Revolution
  - 1911 Wuchang Uprising
  - 1911–1912 Xinhai Lhasa turmoil
  - 1911–1912 1911 Revolution in Xinjiang
- 1911–1914 Bai Lang Rebellion

==== Republic of China ====
- 1854–1949 Yangtze Patrol
  - 1918 USS Monocacy incident
  - 1920 Alice Dollar incident
- 1911–1914 Bai Lang Rebellion
- 1913 Second Revolution (Republic of China)
- 1914–1918 World War I
  - 1914–1918 Asian and Pacific theatre of World War I
    - 1914 Siege of Tsingtao
- 1915–1916 National Protection War
- 1916–1928 Warlord Era
  - 1917 Manchu Restoration
  - 1920 Zhili–Anhui War
  - 1920–1922 Guangdong–Guangxi War
  - 1920–1926 Spirit Soldier rebellions (1920–1926)
  - 1922 First Zhili–Fengtian War
  - 1923 Lincheng Outrage
  - 1924 Second Zhili–Fengtian War
  - 1924 1924 Beijing Coup
  - 1925 Anti-Fengtian War
  - 1925–1927 Yunnan–Guangxi War
  - 1926 March 18 Massacre
  - 1926–1928 Northern Expedition
  - 1927 April 12 Incident
- 1917–1949 Golok conflicts (1917–1949)
- 1920 Battle of Samdunja
- 1920 Battle of Fengwudong
- 1920 Hunchun incident
- 1920 Battle of Qingshanli
- 1924 Canton Merchants' Corps Uprising
- 1925 Shameen Incident
- 1926 Canton Coup
- 1927–1930 Muslim conflict in Gansu (1927–1930)
  - 1927 Shanghai massacre
- 1927–1950 Chinese Civil War
  - 1927 Autumn Harvest Uprising
  - 1930 Li Lisan line
  - 1930–1934 Encirclement campaigns (Chinese Civil War)
  - 1934–1935 Long March
  - 1934–1937 Southern Guerilla War
  - 1945–1949 Operation Beleaguer
  - 1945–1947 Campaign to suppress bandits in northeast China
  - 1948 Liaoshen campaign
  - 1948–1949 Huaihai campaign
  - 1948–1949 Pingjin campaign
  - 1949 Yangtze River Crossing campaign
  - 1949 Shanghai Campaign
- 1928 Jinan incident
- 1928 Huanggutun incident
- 1928–1929 Red Spears' uprising in Shandong
- 1929 Warlord Rebellion in northeastern Shandong
  - 1929 Beijing Revolt
- 1929–1930 Central Plains War
  - 1929 Chiang-Gui War
- 1929 Sino-Soviet conflict (1929)
- 1930 – present Xinjiang conflict
  - 1931–1934 Kumul Rebellion
  - 1935 Charkhlik revolt
  - 1937 Islamic rebellion in Xinjiang (1937)
  - 1944–1946 Ili Rebellion
    - 1946–1948 Battle of Baitag Bogd
- 1930–1932 Sino-Tibetan War of 1930–1932
  - 1932–1933 Qinghai–Tibet War
- 1931–1932 Japanese invasion of Manchuria
- 1931–1942 Pacification of Manchukuo
- 1932–1939 Soviet–Japanese border conflicts
- 1932 January 28 incident
- 1932 Han–Liu War
- 1933 Defense of the Great Wall
- 1933–1936 Actions in Inner Mongolia (1933–36)
- 1934 Two-Liu war
- 1934 War in Ningxia (1934)
- 1937–1945 Second Sino-Japanese War
  - 1939–1940 1939–40 Winter Offensive
  - 1940–1941 Hundred Regiments Offensive
  - 1943–1945 Battle of Northern Burma and Western Yunnan
  - 1944 Operation Ichi-Go
- 1939–1945 World War II
  - 1941–1945 Pacific War
    - 1945 Soviet–Japanese War
      - 1945 Soviet invasion of Manchuria

==== People's Republic of China ====
- 1927–1949 Chinese Civil War
  - 1945–1949 Operation Beleaguer
  - 1945–1947 Campaign to suppress bandits in northeast China
  - 1948 Liaoshen campaign
  - 1948–1949 Huaihai campaign
  - 1948–1949 Pingjin campaign
  - 1949 Yangtze River Crossing campaign
  - 1949 Shanghai Campaign
  - 1950 Battle of Hainan Island
  - 1950 Wanshan Archipelago Campaign
- 1930–present Xinjiang conflict
  - 1949 Incorporation of Xinjiang into the People's Republic of China
- 1950–1958 Kuomintang Islamic insurgency
- 1950–1951 Annexation of Tibet by the People's Republic of China
  - 1950 Battle of Chamdo
- 1950–1953 Campaign to Suppress Counterrevolutionaries
- 1950–1953 Korean War
- 1953 Dongshan Island Campaign
- 1954–1955 First Taiwan Strait Crisis
- 1955–1975 Vietnam War
- 1958 Second Taiwan Strait Crisis
- 1959 Spirit Soldier rebellion (1959)
- 1959 1959 Tibetan uprising
- 1960–1961 1960–61 campaign at the China–Burma border
- 1961–1972 Project National Glory
- 1962 Sino-Indian War
- 1967 Nathu La and Cho La clashes
- 1969 Sino–Soviet border conflict
- 1979 Sino-Vietnamese War
- 1979–1991 Sino-Vietnamese conflicts (1979–1991)
  - 1988 Johnson South Reef Skirmish
- 1986–1987 Sumdorong Chu standoff
- 1989 Tiananmen Square protests and massacre
- 1995–1996 Third Taiwan Strait Crisis
- 2001 Hainan Island incident
- 2012 Scarborough Shoal standoff
- 2013 2013 Depsang standoff
- 2014 Hai Yang Shi You 981 standoff
- 2017 2017 China–India border standoff
- 2020–2021 2020–2021 China–India skirmishes

=== Hong Kong ===
- 1521 Battle of Tunmen
- 1522 Battle of Sincouwaan
- 1839–1842 First Opium War
- 1855–1868 Punti–Hakka Clan Wars
- 1855 Battle of Ty-ho Bay
- 1861 North Star affair
- 1899 Six-Day War (1899)
- 1927 Irene incident
- 1939–1945 World War II
  - 1941–1945 Pacific War
    - 1941–1945 South-East Asian theatre of World War II
      - 1941 Battle of Hong Kong

=== Japan ===
- Civil War of Wa
- 463 Kibi Clan Rebellion
- 479 Prince Hoshikawa Rebellion
- 527–528 Iwai Rebellion
- 552–587 Soga–Mononobe conflict
- 587 Battle of Shigisan
- 645 Isshi Incident
- 672 Jinshin War
- 720–721 Hayato rebellion
- 740 Fujiwara no Hirotsugu rebellion
- 764 Fujiwara no Nakamaro Rebellion
- 774–812 Thirty-Eight Years' War
- 810 Kusuko Incident
- 935–940 Tengyō no Ran
- 1019 Toi invasion
- 1051–1062 Former Nine Years' War
- 1083–1089 Gosannen War
- 1156 Hōgen rebellion
- 1160 Heiji rebellion
- 1177 Shishigatani incident
- 1180–1185 Genpei War
- 1201 Kennin Rebellion
- 1221 Jōkyū War
- 1206–1368 Mongol invasions and conquests
  - 1274–1281 Mongol invasions of Japan
    - 1274 Battle of Bun'ei
    - 1281 Battle of Kōan
- 1331–1333 Genkō War
- 1336 Battle of Tatarahama (1336)
- 1336 Battle of Minatogawa
- 1337 Siege of Kanegasaki (1337)
- 1338–1339 Sieges of Kuromaru
- 1348 Battle of Shijōnawate
- 1350–1351 Kannō disturbance
- 1351 Battle of Yawata
- 1419 Ōei Invasion
- 1428 Shōchō uprising
- 1440–1441 Yūki War
- 1441 Kakitsu uprising
- 1456–1457 Koshamain's War
- 1454–1482 Kyōtoku incident
- 1467–1615 Sengoku period
  - 1467–1477 Ōnin War
  - 1487–1488 Kaga Rebellion
  - 1535 Battle of Idano
  - 1545–1546 Siege of Kawagoe Castle
  - 1551 Tainei-ji incident
  - 1555 Battle of Itsukushima
  - 1553–1564 Battles of Kawanakajima
  - 1560 Battle of Okehazama
  - 1570 Battle of Anegawa
  - 1570–1580 Ishiyama Hongan-ji War
  - 1575 Battle of Nagashino
  - 1577 Battle of Tedorigawa
  - 1579–1582 Tenshō Iga War
    - 1579 First Tenshō Iga War
    - 1581 Second Tenshō Iga War
  - 1582 Honnō-ji Incident
  - 1582 Battle of Yamazaki
  - 1585 Invasion of Shikoku (1585)
  - 1586–1587 Kyūshū campaign
  - 1590 Siege of Odawara (1590)
  - 1591 Kunohe rebellion
  - 1600 Battle of Sekigahara
  - 1603 Rokugō rebellion
  - 1609 Invasion of Ryukyu
  - 1615 Siege of Osaka Castle
- 1637–1638 Shimabara Rebellion
- 1651 Keian Uprising
- 1669–1672 Shakushain's revolt
- 1686 Jōkyō uprising
- 1789 Menashi–Kunashir rebellion
- 1853–1867 Bakumatsu
  - 1861 Tsushima incident
  - 1862–1866 Teradaya incident
  - 1863–1864 Shimonoseki campaign
  - 1863 Bombardment of Kagoshima
  - 1863 Tenchūgumi incident
  - 1864–1865 Mito rebellion
  - 1864 Kinmon incident
  - 1864 First Chōshū expedition
  - 1866 Second Chōshū expedition
- 1868 Two Lords Incident
- 1868–1869 Boshin War
  - 1868 Kobe Incident
  - 1868 Sakai incident
- 1874 Saga Rebellion
- 1876 Shinpūren Rebellion
- 1876 Akizuki Rebellion
- 1876 Hagi Rebellion
- 1877 Satsuma Rebellion
- 1878 Takebashi incident
- 1882 Fukushima incident (1882)
- 1884 Chichibu incident
- 1904–1905 Russo-Japanese War
- 1932 May 15 incident
- 1934 Military Academy incident
- 1936 February 26 incident
- 1939–1945 World War II
  - 1941–1945 Pacific War
    - 1942–1945 Japan campaign
      - 1942–1945 Air raids on Japan
        - 1942 Doolittle Raid
      - 1945 Volcano and Ryukyu Islands campaign
      - 1945 Battle of Sagami Bay
  - 1945 Kyūjō incident
  - 1945 Matsue incident
- 1946 Shibuya incident
- 1972 Asama-Sansō incident
- 1985–1989 Yama–Ichi War
- 2001 Battle of Amami-Ōshima

=== Macau ===
- 1598–1663 Dutch–Portuguese War
- 1809–1810 Battle of the Tiger's Mouth
- 1839–1842 First Opium War
- 1849 Passaleão incident

=== Mongolia ===
- 215 BC Qin's campaign against the Xiongnu
- 133 BC – 91 AD Han–Xiongnu War
- 60–53 BC Xiongnu Civil War
- 581–593 Göktürk civil war
- 626–649 Emperor Taizong's campaign against Eastern Tujue
  - 657 Conquest of the Western Turks
- 629–630 Tang campaigns against the Western Turks
- 1206–1337 Mongol invasions and conquests
- 1409 Battle of Kherlen
- 1687–1758 Dzungar–Qing Wars
  - 1715–1720 Second Dzungar-Qing War
- 1911–1912 1911 Revolution
  - 1911 Mongolian Revolution of 1911
- 1917–1923 Russian Civil War
  - 1918–1923 Eastern Front of the Russian Civil War
    - 1921 Mongolian Revolution of 1921
- 1930–present Xinjiang conflict
  - 1944–1946 Ili Rebellion
    - 1946–1948 Battle of Baitag Bogd
- 1932 1932 armed uprising in Mongolia
- 1939–1945 World War II
  - 1938–1939 Soviet–Japanese border conflicts
  - 1945 Soviet invasion of Manchuria

=== North Korea ===
- 109–108 BC Han conquest of Gojoseon
- 319–407 Goguryeo–Yan Wars
- 364–407 Silla–Goguryeo and Paekche–Kaya–Wa War
- 598–614 Goguryeo–Sui War
- 645–668 Goguryeo–Tang War
  - 645–648 First conflict of the Goguryeo–Tang War
- 993–1019 Goryeo–Khitan War
  - 993 First conflict in the Goryeo–Khitan War
  - 1010–1011 Second conflict in the Goryeo–Khitan War
  - 1018–1019 Third conflict in the Goryeo–Khitan War
- 10th–17th century Korean–Jurchen border conflicts
- 1186–1202 Silla restoration movement
- 1206–1368 Mongol invasions and conquests
  - 1231–1259 Mongol invasions of Korea
- 1270–1273 Sambyeolcho Rebellion
- 1359–1360 Red Turban invasions of Goryeo
- 1388 Wihwado Retreat
- 1467 Yi Siae's Rebellion
- 1592–1598 Imjin War
- 1618–1683 Transition from Ming to Qing
- 1624 Yi Kwal's Rebellion
- 1812 Hong Kyŏngnae's Rebellion
- 1866 General Sherman incident
- 1894–1895 First Sino-Japanese War
- 1937 Battle of Pochonbo
- 1939–1945 World War II
  - 1941–1945 Pacific War
    - 1945 Soviet–Japanese War
      - 1945 Seishin Operation
- 1945–present Korean conflict
  - 1950–1953 Korean War
    - 1951 Chinese spring offensive
  - 1953–present Korean border incidents
    - 1966–1969 Korean DMZ Conflict (1966–69)
    - 1968 Pueblo incident
    - 1969 1969 EC-121 shootdown incident
    - 1975 Major Henderson incident
    - 1976 Operation Paul Bunyan
  - 1993–1994 1994 North Korean nuclear crisis
  - 2017–2018 2017–2018 North Korea crisis

=== South Korea ===
- 109–108 BC Han conquest of Gojoseon
- 3rd century – 562 Fall of the Gaya confederacy
- 319–407 Goguryeo–Yan Wars
- 364–407 Silla–Goguryeo and Paekche–Kaya–Wa War
- 598–614 Goguryeo–Sui War
- 645–668 Goguryeo–Tang War
  - 645–648 First conflict of the Goguryeo–Tang War
  - 660–663 Paekche–Tang War
- 993–1019 Goryeo–Khitan War
  - 993 First conflict in the Goryeo–Khitan War
  - 1010–1011 Second conflict in the Goryeo–Khitan War
  - 1018–1019 Third conflict in the Goryeo–Khitan War
- 1206–1368 Mongol invasions and conquests
  - 1231–1259 Mongol invasions of Korea
- 1592–1598 Imjin War
- 1604 Battle of Dangpo (1604)
- 1618–1683 Transition from Ming to Qing
- 1624 Yi Kwal's Rebellion
- 1866 French campaign against Korea (1866)
- 1871 United States expedition to Korea
- 1875 Ganghwa Island incident
- 1882 Imo Incident
- 1884 Gapsin Coup
- 1885–1887 Port Hamilton incident
- 1894–1895 Donghak Peasant Revolution
- 1895 Assassination of Empress Myeongseong
- 1907 Battle of Namdaemun
- 1945–present Korean conflict
  - 1946 Autumn Uprising of 1946
  - 1948 Yeosu–Suncheon rebellion
  - 1948–1949 Jeju uprising
  - 1950–1953 Korean War
    - 1950 Battle of Pusan Perimeter
    - 1951 Chinese spring offensive
  - 1953–present Korean border incidents
    - 1966–1969 Korean DMZ Conflict (1966–69)
    - 1968 Blue House raid
    - 1968 Uljin–Samcheok Landings
    - 1976 Operation Paul Bunyan
    - 1996 1996 Gangneung submarine infiltration incident
    - 1998 1998 Sokcho submarine incident
    - 1998 1998 Yosu submersible incident
    - 1999 Battle of Yeonpyeong (1999)
    - 2002 Battle of Yeonpyeong (2002)
    - 2009 Daecheong incident
    - 2010 ROKS Cheonan sinking
    - 2010 2010 Yeonpyeongdo bombardment
  - 1993–1994 1994 North Korean nuclear crisis
  - 2017–2018 2017–2018 North Korea crisis
- 1961 May 16 coup
- 1971 Unit 684 mutiny
- 1979 1979 South Korean coup d'état
- 1980 Coup d'état of May Seventeenth
- 1980 Gwangju Uprising
- 2024 2024 South Korean martial law crisis

=== Taiwan ===
- 1618–1683 Transition from Ming to Qing
- 1620s–1670s Sino-Dutch conflicts
  - 1633 Battle of Liaoluo Bay
  - 1661–1662 Siege of Fort Zeelandia
- 1626 Spanish expedition to Formosa
- 1635–1636 Dutch pacification campaign on Formosa
- 1641 Battle of San Salvador (1641)
- 1642 Battle of San Salvador (1642)
- 1652 Guo Huaiyi rebellion
- 1670 Battle of Shalu Village
- 1673–1681 Revolt of the Three Feudatories
- 1731–1732 Ta-Chia-hsi revolt
- 1786–1788 Lin Shuangwen rebellion
- 1839–1842 First Opium War
- 1867 Rover incident
- 1867 Formosa Expedition
- 1871 Mudan incident
- 1874 Japanese invasion of Taiwan (1874)
- 1884–1885 Sino-French War
- 1894–1895 First Sino-Japanese War
- 1895 Japanese invasion of Taiwan (1895)
- 1896 Xincheng Incident
- 1907 Beipu uprising
- 1914 Truku War
- 1915 Tapani incident
- 1927–1950 Chinese Civil War
  - 1950 Battle of Guningtou
- 1930 Musha Incident
- 1939–1945 World War II
  - 1941–1945 Pacific War
- 1954–1955 First Taiwan Strait Crisis
- 1958 Second Taiwan Strait Crisis
- 1961–1972 Project National Glory
- 1995–1996 Third Taiwan Strait Crisis
- 2022–present Fourth Taiwan Strait Crisis

== Southeast Asia ==
=== Brunei ===
- 1500s Tondo War
- 1578 Castilian War
- 1660–1673 Bruneian Civil War of 1660
- 1769–1790 Apostate War
- 1831–1862 Pacification of Lanun
- 1826–1828 Bruneian Civil War of 1826
- 1836–1840 Sarawak Uprising of 1836
- 1845–1846 Anglo-Bruneian War
- 1939–1945 World War II
  - 1941–1945 Pacific War
    - 1941–1945 South West Pacific theatre of World War II
      - 1945 Borneo campaign
- 1962 Brunei revolt

=== Cambodia ===
- 950–1220 Khmer–Cham wars
  - 1177 Battle of Tonlé Sap
- 1431 Fall of Angkor
- 1591–1594 Siamese–Cambodian War (1591–1594)
- 1593–1599 Cambodian–Spanish War
- 1594 Fall of Longvek
- 1643–1644 Cambodian–Dutch War
- 1771–1802 Tây Sơn wars
- 1771–1773 Siamese–Vietnamese War (1771–1773)
- 1813–1845 Vietnamese invasions of Cambodia
  - 1812–1813 Cambodian conflict (1812–1813)
  - 1820 Cambodian rebellion (1820)
  - 1840–1841 Cambodian Uprising (1840–1841)
  - 1840–1845 Siamese–Vietnamese War (1840–1845)
- 1833–1834 Siamese–Vietnamese War (1833–1834)
- 1939–1945 World War II
  - 1940 Japanese invasion of French Indochina
  - 1941–1945 Pacific War
    - 1941–1945 South-East Asian theatre of World War II
      - 1944–1945 Bombing of South-East Asia (1944–1945)
      - 1945 Japanese coup d'état in French Indochina
- 1946–1954 First Indochina War
- 1955–1975 Vietnam War
  - 1968–1975 Cambodian Civil War
- 1975 Mayaguez incident
- 1964–1992 FULRO insurgency
- 1978–1989 Cambodian–Vietnamese War
  - 1979–1989 Vietnamese border raids in Thailand
- 1979–1998 Khmer Rouge insurgency
- 1997 1997 Cambodian coup d'état
- 2000 2000 Cambodian coup d'état attempt
- 2003 2003 Phnom Penh riots
- 2008–2011 2008–2011 Cambodian–Thai border crisis
- 2025 2025 Cambodia–Thailand border crisis

=== Indonesia ===
- 1206–1368 Mongol invasions and conquests
  - 1293 Mongol invasion of Java
- 1275–1292 Pamalayu
- 1292 Jayakatwang rebellion
- c. 14th century – 1487 Majapahit–Sundanese conflicts
- 1355–1362 Majapahit invasion of Nan Sarunai
- c. 15th century Malacca–Majapahit conflict
- 1404–1406 Regreg War
- 1478–1527 Demak–Majapahit conflicts
- 1509–1641 Malay–Portuguese conflicts
  - 1521 Attack on Bintan (1521)
  - 1525 Battle of Lingga
  - 1526 Siege of Bintan
- 1512–1527 Demak–Portuguese conflicts
  - 1527 Conquest of Sunda Kelapa
- 1519–1639 Acehnese–Portuguese conflicts
  - 1521 Battle of Aceh (1521)
  - 1522 Pedir expedition (1522)
  - 1523–1524 Acehnese conquest of Pasai
  - 1528 Battle of Aceh (1528)
  - 1606 Aceh expedition (1606)
- 1527–1579 Banten invasions of Pajajaran
- 1528–1629 Malay-Acehnese conflicts
- 1530–1605 Ternatean–Portuguese conflicts
  - 1582 Ternate expedition (1582)
  - 1585 Ternate expedition (1585)
  - 1603 Ternate expedition (1603)
- 1566–1648 Eighty Years' War
- 1570–1575 War of the League of the Indies
- 1596 Banten invasion of Palembang
- 1598–1663 Dutch–Portuguese War
- 1609–1621 Dutch conquest of the Banda Islands
- 1614–1625 Mataram conquest of Surabaya
- 1618–1619 Jayakarta War
- 1619 Fall of Jayakarta
- 1628–1757 Dutch–Mataram conflicts
- 1646 Battle of Passempe
- 1648 Massacre of ulema by Amangkurat I
- 1656–1659 Banten–Dutch war (1656–1659)
- 1666–1669 Makassar War
- 1674–1681 Trunajaya rebellion
- 1704–1757 Javanese Wars of Succession
  - 1704–1708 First Javanese War of Succession
  - 1719–1723 Second Javanese War of Succession
  - 1749–1757 Third Javanese War of Succession
- 1740 1740 Batavia massacre
- 1741–1743 Java War (1741–1743)
- 1749 Battle of Penfui
- 1792–1815 French Revolutionary and Napoleonic Wars
  - 1792–1802 French Revolutionary Wars
    - 1793–1801 East Indies theatre of the French Revolutionary Wars
  - 1803–1815 Napoleonic Wars
    - 1806–1807 Java campaign of 1806–1807
    - 1810 Invasion of the Spice Islands
    - 1811 Invasion of Java (1811)
    - 1812–1813 Sambas expeditions
- 1803–1837 Padri War
- 1812 British expedition to Palembang
- 1812 Sack of Yogyakarta
- 1813 Kedopok War
- 1814 Buleleng expedition
- 1814 British expedition to Makassar
- 1819 First expedition to Palembang
- 1821 Second expedition to Palembang
- 1823 Expedition to the West Coast of Borneo
- 1824–1825 First Bone War
- 1825–1830 Java War
- 1831 Dutch expedition on the west coast of Sumatra
- 1832 First Sumatran expedition
- 1838–1839 Second Sumatran expedition
- 1846 Dutch intervention in northern Bali (1846)
- 1848 Dutch intervention in northern Bali (1848)
- 1849 Dutch intervention in Bali (1849)
- 1851–1859 Palembang Highlands Expeditions
- 1854–1855 Expedition against the Chinese in Montrado
- 1855–1864 Nias Expedition
- 1858 Dutch intervention in Bali (1858)
- 1859–1860 Second Bone War
- 1859–1863 Banjarmasin War
- 1864–1868 Pasoemah Expedition
- 1873–1904 Aceh War
- 1884–1885 Mandor rebellion
- 1885 Jambi uprising
- 1890 Edi Expedition
- 1894 Dutch intervention in Lombok and Karangasem
- 1903 Kerinci Expedition
- 1905 South Sulawesi expeditions of 1905
- 1906 Dutch intervention in Bali (1906)
- 1908 Dutch intervention in Bali (1908)
- 1939–1945 World War II
  - 1941–1945 Pacific War
    - 1941–1945 South-East Asian theatre of World War II
      - 1944–1945 Bombing of South-East Asia (1944–1945)
      - 1945 Battle of the Malacca Strait
    - 1941–1945 South West Pacific theatre of World War II
      - 1941–1942 Dutch East Indies campaign
      - 1942–1943 Battle of Timor
      - 1942–1945 New Guinea campaign
      - 1945 Borneo campaign
- 1945–1949 Indonesian National Revolution
- 1949–1962 Darul Islam rebellion
- 1950 APRA coup d'état
- 1950 Makassar Uprising
- 1950 Invasion of Buru
- 1950 Invasion of Ambon
- 1958–1961 Permesta rebellion
- 1958–1961 PRRI rebellion
- 1961–1962 Operation Trikora
  - 1962 Battle of Arafura Sea
- 1962–present Papua conflict
- 1963–1966 Indonesia–Malaysia confrontation
- 1965 30 September Movement
- 1965–1966 Indonesian mass killings of 1965–66
  - 1965 Operation Black Crow
- 1967 Operation Security and Order
- 1968 Operation Trisula
- 1976–2005 Insurgency in Aceh
- 1981–present Terrorism in Indonesia
  - 2016–2022 Operation Madago Raya
- 1984 Tanjung Priok massacre
- 1989 Talangsari incident
- 1999–2002 Maluku sectarian conflict
- 2001 Sampit conflict
- 2003 2003 Bawean incident
- 2012 MT Zafirah hijacking

=== Laos ===
- 1568–1569 Burmese–Siamese War (1568–1569)
- 1771–1802 Tây Sơn wars
- 1778–1779 Lao–Siamese War (1778–1779)
- 1826–1828 Lao rebellion (1826–1828)
- 1893 1893 Franco-Siamese crisis
- 1901–1936 Holy Man's Rebellion
- 1946–1954 First Indochina War
  - 1959–1975 Laotian Civil War
    - 1959–1960 1960 Laotian coups
    - 1964 1964 Laotian coups
  - 1965 1965 Laotian coups
  - 1966 1966 Laotian coup d'état
  - 1967 1967 Opium War
  - 1973 1973 Laotian coup attempt
- 1975–present Insurgency in Laos
- 1987–1988 Thai–Laotian Border War

=== Malaysia ===
- 1447–1456 Siamese invasions of Malacca
- 1500 Siamese invasion of Malacca (1500)
- 15th century Malacca–Majapahit conflict
- 1509–1641 Malay–Portuguese conflicts
  - 1511 Capture of Malacca (1511)
  - 1520 Battle of Pago
  - 1523 Battle of Muar River
  - 1535 Battle of Ugentana
  - 1536 Battle of Ugentana (1536)
  - 1551 Siege of Malacca (1551)
  - 1587 Siege of Johor (1587)
  - 1606 Siege of Malacca (1606)
  - 1641 Siege of Malacca (1641)
- 1528–1629 Malay-Acehnese conflicts
  - 1613–1615 Acehnese invasion of Johor
  - 1619 Acehnese invasion of Kedah
  - 1620 Acehnese conquest of Perak
- 1519–1639 Acehnese–Portuguese conflicts
- 1570–1575 War of the League of the Indies
- 1578 Castilian War
- 1598–1663 Dutch–Portuguese War
- 1660–1673 Bruneian Civil War of 1660
- 1666–1681 Johor–Jambi wars
- 1670s–1862 Pacification of Lanun
- 1769–1788 Twenty Years' War
- 1821–1842 Siamese invasion of Kedah
- 1831–1832 Naning War
- 1845–1846 Anglo-Bruneian War
- 1857–1863 Pahang Civil War
- 1861–1874 Larut Wars
- 1867–1874 Klang War
- 1875–1876 Perak War
- 1879 Jementah Civil War
- 1891–1895 Pahang Uprising
- 1894–1905 Mat Salleh Rebellion
- 1914–1918 World War I
  - 1914–1918 Asian and Pacific theatre of World War I
- 1915 Kelantan rebellion
- 1939–1945 World War II
  - 1941–1945 Pacific War
    - 1941–1945 South-East Asian theatre of World War II
      - 1941–1942 Malayan Campaign
      - 1944–1945 Bombing of South-East Asia (1944–1945)
      - 1945 Battle of the Malacca Strait
    - 1941–1945 South West Pacific theatre of World War II
      - 1945 Borneo campaign
  - 1943–1944 Jesselton revolt
- 1946–1950 Anti-cession movement of Sarawak
- 1948–1960 Malayan Emergency
- 1962–1990 Communist insurgency in Sarawak
- 1962–present Cross border attacks in Sabah
  - 2013 2013 Lahad Datu standoff
- 1962 Raid on Limbang
- 1963–1966 Indonesia–Malaysia confrontation
- 1968–1989 Communist insurgency in Malaysia (1968–1989)
- 1985 Memali incident
- 2000 Sauk Siege
- 2015 MT Orkim Harmony hijacking

=== Myanmar (Burma) ===
- 1165–1181 Polonnaruwa–Pagan War
- 1206–1368 Mongol invasions and conquests
  - 1277–1287 First Mongol invasion of Burma
  - 1300–1301 Second Mongol invasion of Burma
- 1385–1423 Forty Years' War
- 1530–1666 Mrauk U invasion of Chittagong
- 1534–1541 Toungoo–Hanthawaddy War
- 1538–1545 Toungoo–Ava War
- 1539–1617 Burmese-Portuguese conflicts
  - 1605 1605 Syriam battles
- 1548–1549 Burmese–Siamese War (1547–1549)
- 1584–1593 Burmese–Siamese War (1584–1593)
- 1593–1600 Burmese–Siamese War (1593–1600)
- 1598–1599 Mrauk U invasion of Pegu
- 1609–1622 Burmese–Siamese War (1609–1622)
- 1662–1664 Burmese–Siamese War (1662–1664)
- 1687–1688 Anglo-Siamese War
- 1717–1749 Manipuri–Burmese wars of 1717 to 1749
- 1752–1757 Konbaung–Hanthawaddy War
- 1755–1792 Ten Great Campaigns
  - 1765–1769 Sino-Burmese War (1765–69)
- 1759–1760 Burmese–Siamese War (1759–1760)
- 1765–1767 Burmese–Siamese War (1765–1767)
- 1785 Konbaung conquest of Arakan
- 1788 Tavoy campaign (1788)
- 1792–1794 Burmese–Siamese War (1792–1794)
- 1802–1805 Burmese–Siamese War (1802–1805)
- 1809–1812 Burmese–Siamese War (1809–1812)
- 1816–1826 Burmese invasions of Assam
- 1824–1885 Anglo-Burmese wars
  - 1823–1826 First Anglo-Burmese War
  - 1852–1853 Second Anglo-Burmese War
  - 1885–1886 Third Anglo-Burmese War
- 1849–1855 Burmese–Siamese War (1849–1855)
- 1885–1895 Burmese resistance movement 1885–1895
- 1939–1945 World War II
  - 1941–1945 Pacific War
    - 1941–1945 Burma campaign
        - 1941–1942 Japanese invasion of Burma
        - 1942–1943 Burma campaign (1942–1943)
        - 1944 Burma campaign (1944)
        - 1944–1945 Burma campaign (1944–1945)
- 1948–ongoing Internal conflict in Myanmar
  - 1942–present Rohingya conflict
    - 1978 Operation Dragon King
    - 1991–1992 Operation Clean and Beautiful Nation
    - 2010–2012 2010–2012 Myanmar border clashes
    - 2016–present Conflict in Rakhine State (2016–present)
      - 2016–present Rohingya genocide
  - 1948–1989 Communist insurgency in Burma
  - 1949–present Karen conflict
  - 1958–present Shan conflict
  - 1960–1961 1960–61 campaign at the China–Burma border
  - 1961–present Kachin conflict
  - 1962 1962 Burmese coup d'état
  - 1988–present Karen–Mon conflict
  - 2009 2009 Kokang incident
  - 2015 2015 Kokang offensive
  - 2021 2021 Myanmar coup d'état
  - 2021–present Myanmar Civil War
    - 2023–present Operation 1027

=== Philippines ===
- 1500 Tondo War
- 1521 Battle of Mactan
- 1565 Dagami revolt
- 1565–1898 Spanish–Moro conflict
- 1565–1898 Igorot resistance to Spanish colonization
- 1566–1648 Eighty Years' War
- 1571 Battle of Bangkusay
- 1574 Battle of Manila (1574)
- 1578 Castilian War
- 1582 1582 Cagayan battles
- 1587–1588 Tondo Conspiracy
- 1596 Magalat revolt
- 1601 Igorot revolt
- 1603 Sangley Rebellion (1603)
- 1607 Caquenga's Revolt
- 1621–1622 Bankaw revolt
- 1621 Tamblot uprising
- 1621 Irraya Revolt
- 1639–1640 Sangley Rebellion (1639)
- 1662 Sangley Massacre (1662)
- 1756–1763 Seven Years' War
  - 1762–1763 Anglo-Spanish War (1762–1763)
- 1792–1815 French Revolutionary and Napoleonic Wars
  - 1792–1802 French Revolutionary Wars
    - 1793–1801 East Indies theatre of the French Revolutionary Wars
  - 1796–1808 Anglo-Spanish War (1796–1808)
  - 1803–1815 Napoleonic Wars
- 1828 Palmero Conspiracy
- 1872 1872 Cavite mutiny
- 1896–1898 Philippine Revolution
  - 1898 Spanish–American War
- 1899–1913 Philippine–American War
  - 1902–1913 Moro Rebellion
- 1939–1945 World War II
  - 1941–1945 Pacific War
    - 1941–1945 South-East Asian theatre of World War II
      - 1944–1945 Bombing of South-East Asia (1944–1945)
    - 1941–1945 South West Pacific theatre of World War II
      - 1941–1942 Philippines campaign (1941–1942)
      - 1944–1945 Philippines campaign (1944–1945)
    - 1941–1945 Philippine resistance against Japan
- 1946–1954 Hukbalahap rebellion
- 1948–1955 Kamlon rebellion
- 1969–present Civil conflict in the Philippines
  - 1968–2019 Moro conflict
  - 1969–present New People's Army rebellion
  - 2002–2017 Operation Enduring Freedom – Philippines
  - 2014–present ISIL insurgency in the Philippines
- 1986 People Power Revolution
  - 1986 February 1986 Reform the Armed Forces Movement coup
- 1986 Siege of the Manila Hotel
- 1986 God Save the Queen Plot
- 1987 January 1987 Philippine coup attempt
- 1987 August 1987 Philippine coup attempt
- 1989 Camp Cawa-Cawa siege
- 1989 1989 Philippine coup attempt
- 1990 Hotel Delfino siege
- 1990 1990 Mindanao revolt
- 2003 Oakwood mutiny
- 2008 2008 Parañaque shootout
- 2007 Manila Peninsula siege
- 2012–present Scarborough Shoal standoff
- 2016–present Philippine drug war
  - 2021 2021 PNP–PDEA shootout
- 2022 Ungkaya Pukan clash

=== Singapore ===
- 1396 Sack of Singapore
- 1914–1918 World War I
  - 1914–1918 Asian and Pacific theatre of World War I
    - 1915 1915 Singapore Mutiny
- 1939–1945 World War II
  - 1941–1945 Pacific War
    - 1941–1945 South-East Asian theatre of World War II
      - 1941–1942 Malayan Campaign
      - 1942 Fall of Singapore
      - 1944–1945 Bombing of South-East Asia (1944–1945)
- 1963–1966 Indonesia–Malaysia confrontation

=== Thailand ===
- 1441–1474 Ayutthaya–Lan Na War (1441–1474)
- 1548–1549 Burmese–Siamese War (1547–1549)
- 1563–1564 Burmese–Siamese War (1563–1564)
- 1568–1569 Burmese–Siamese War (1568–1569)
- 1584–1593 Burmese–Siamese War (1584–1593)
- 1609–1622 Burmese–Siamese War (1609–1622)
- 1662–1664 Burmese–Siamese War (1662–1664)
- 1688 Siamese revolution of 1688
- 1759–1760 Burmese–Siamese War (1759–1760)
- 1765–1767 Burmese–Siamese War (1765–1767)
- 1767–1771 Taksin's reunification of Siam
- 1775–1776 Burmese–Siamese War (1775–1776)
- 1778–1779 Lao–Siamese War (1778–1779)
- 1785–1786 Burmese–Siamese War (1785–1786)
- 1792–1794 Burmese–Siamese War (1792–1794)
- 1797–1798 Burmese–Siamese War (1797–1798)
- 1802–1805 Burmese–Siamese War (1802–1805)
- 1809–1812 Burmese–Siamese War (1809–1812)
- 1826–1828 Lao rebellion (1826–1828)
- 1849–1855 Burmese–Siamese War (1849–1855)
- 1865–1890 Haw wars
- 1901–1936 Holy Man's Rebellion
- 1902–1904 Ngiao rebellion
- 1933 June 1933 Siamese coup d'état
- 1933 Boworadet Rebellion
- 1935 Rebellion of the Sergeants
- 1939–1945 World War II
  - 1940–1941 Franco-Thai War
  - 1940–1941 Japanese invasion of Thailand
- 1947 1947 Thai coup d'état
- 1948 1948 Thai coup d'état
- 1948 Army General Staff plot
- 1949 Palace Rebellion
- 1951 Manhattan Rebellion
- 1951 Silent Coup (Thailand)
- 1957 1957 Thai coup d'état
- 1965–1983 Communist insurgency in Thailand
- 1977 March 1977 Thai coup attempt
- 1977 October 1977 Thai coup d'état
- 1981 1981 Thai military rebellion
- 1985 1985 Thai coup attempt
- 1978–1989 Cambodian–Vietnamese War
  - 1979–1989 Vietnamese border raids in Thailand
- 1987–1988 Thai–Laotian Border War
- 1991 1991 Thai coup d'état
- 2004 – present South Thailand insurgency
- 2006 2006 Thai coup d'état
- 2008–2011 2008–2011 Cambodian–Thai border crisis
- 2014 2014 Thai coup d'état
- 2025 2025 Cambodia–Thailand border conflict

=== Timor-Leste ===
- 1939–1945 World War II
    - 1941–1945 South West Pacific theatre of World War II
      - 1942–1943 Battle of Timor
- 1959 1959 Viqueque rebellion
- 1975 East Timorese civil war
- 1975 Operation Flamboyan
- 1975–1976 Indonesian invasion of East Timor
- 1975–1999 Indonesian occupation of East Timor
- 1999–2002 1999 East Timorese crisis
- 2006 2006 East Timorese crisis
- 2006–2013 Operation Astute

=== Vietnam ===
- 111 BC Han–Nanyue War
- 138 BC – 43 AD Southward expansion of the Han dynasty
  - 40–43 Trung sisters' rebellion
- 263–270 Jiao Province Campaign
- 602 Sui–Early Lý War
- 605 Sui–Lâm Ấp war
- 846–866 Tang–Nanzhao conflicts in Annan
- 938–939 Battle of Bạch Đằng River (938)
- 950–1220 Khmer–Cham wars
  - 1128–1150 Đại Việt–Khmer War
- 966–968 Anarchy of the 12 Warlords
- 981 Song–Đại Cồ Việt war
- 982 Champa–Đại Cồ Việt war (982)
- 1041–1052 Nong Zhigao rebellions
- 1075–1077 Song–Đại Việt war
- 1206–1368 Mongol invasions and conquests
  - 1257–1288 Mongol invasions of Vietnam
- 1367–1390 Champa–Đại Việt War (1367–1390)
- 1406–1407 Ming conquest of Đại Ngu
- 1418–1427 Lam Sơn uprising
- 1471 Champa–Đại Việt War (1471)
- 1479–1484 Đại Việt–Lan Xang War (1479–1484)
- 1516–1521 Trần Cao rebellion
- 1533–1677 Lê–Mạc War
- 1627–1775 Trịnh–Nguyễn War
- 1771–1802 Tây Sơn wars
  - 1784–1785 Battle of Rạch Gầm-Xoài Mút
- 1777–1820 French assistance to Nguyễn Ánh
- 1788–1789 Qing-Tây Sơn War
- 1820 Cambodian rebellion (1820)
- 1825–1827 Phan Bá Vành's Rebellion
- 1822–1823 Ja Lidong rebellion
- 1826 Nduai Kabait rebellion
- 1833–1835 Lê Văn Khôi revolt
- 1833–1834 Siamese–Vietnamese War (1833–1834)
- 1833–1835 Nông Văn Vân's Rebellion
- 1834–1835 Ja Thak Wa uprising
- 1840–1841 Cambodian Uprising (1840–1841)
- 1840–1845 Siamese–Vietnamese War (1840–1845)
- 1847 Bombardment of Tourane (1847)
- 1858–1885 French conquest of Vietnam
  - 1858–1862 Cochinchina campaign
  - 1873–1874 Garnier Expedition
  - 1883–1886 Tonkin campaign
    - 1884–1886 Sino-French War
- 1884–1913 Yên Thế Insurrection
- 1885–1896 Cần Vương movement
- 1886–1896 Pacification of Tonkin
- 1913–1916 1916 Cochinchina uprising
- 1917–1918 Thái Nguyên uprising
- 1930 Yên Bái mutiny
- 1930–1931 Nghệ-Tĩnh Soviets
- 1933–present Xinjiang conflict
  - 2014 2014 China–Vietnam border shootout
- 1937 Dieu Python movement
- 1939–1945 World War II
  - 1940 Japanese invasion of French Indochina
  - 1940–1941 Franco-Thai War
    - 1940 1940 Cochinchina uprising
  - 1941–1945 South-East Asian theatre of World War II
    - 1945 Japanese coup d'état in French Indochina
    - 1945 August Revolution
- 1945–1949 Civil conflicts in Vietnam (1945–1949)
- 1945–1946 War in Vietnam (1945–1946)
- 1946 Haiphong incident
- 1946–1954 First Indochina War
- 1955 1955 South Vietnamese conflict
- 1955–1975 Vietnam War
  - 1956 Quỳnh Lưu uprising
  - 1959–1963 War in Vietnam (1959–1963)
  - 1960 1960 South Vietnamese coup attempt
  - 1969 Joint warfare in South Vietnam, 1963–1969
  - 1963 Buddhist crisis
    - 1963 1963 South Vietnamese coup d'état
  - 1964 January 1964 South Vietnamese coup
  - 1964 1964 FLHP rebellion
  - 1964 September 1964 South Vietnamese coup attempt
  - 1964 December 1964 South Vietnamese coup
  - 1965 1965 South Vietnamese coup
  - 1972 Easter Offensive
  - 1975 1975 spring offensive
- 1964–1992 FULRO insurgency
- 1978–1989 Cambodian–Vietnamese War
- 1979 Sino-Vietnamese War
- 1979–1991 Sino-Vietnamese conflicts (1979–1991)
- 1979–1989 Vietnamese border raids in Thailand
- 2014 2014 China–Vietnam border shootout
- 2023 2023 Đắk Lắk attacks

== South Asia ==
=== Afghanistan ===
- 208–206 BC Siege of Bactra
- 208 BC Battle of the Arius
- 622–750 Early Muslim conquests
  - 633–651 Muslim conquest of Persia
    - 642–705 Muslim conquests of Afghanistan
    - 651–654 Muslim conquest of Khorasan
- 998 Battle of Ghazni (998)
- 999–1002 Ghaznavid–Saffarid war
- 999–1004 Ghaznavid–Samanid war
- 1206–1368 Mongol invasions and conquests
  - 1209–1236 Mongol campaigns in Central Asia
    - 1219–1221 Mongol invasion of the Khwarazmian Empire
- 1504 Siege of Kabul (1504)
- 1505 Campaign against Sultan Masudi Hazaras
- 1505–1506 First Campaign against Turkoman Hazaras
- 1557–1739 Mughal–Persian wars
  - 1605–1606 Siege of Kandahar (1605–1606)
  - 1622–1623 Mughal–Safavid war (1622–1623)
  - 1648–1653 Mughal–Safavid war (1649–1653)
- 1709 Kandahar Rebellion (1709)
- 1720s–1747 Campaigns of Nader Shah
  - 1726–1727 Khorasan campaign of Nader Shah
  - 1729 Herat campaign of 1729
  - 1730–1732 Herat campaign of 1730–1732
  - 1737–1738 Siege of Kandahar
- 1769–1770 Durrani campaign in Khorasan (1769–1770)
- 1809 Battle of Nimla (1809)
- 1818 Battle of Kafir Qala
- 1833 Siege of Herat (1833)
- 1833–1834 1833–1834 expedition of Shah Shujah Durrani
- 1834 Dost Mohammad's Campaign to Jalalabad (1834)
- 1837–1838 First Herat War
- 1838–1839 Afghan Turkestan Campaign (1838–39)
- 1838–1842 First Anglo-Afghan War
- 1843 Hazarajat Campaign of 1843
- 1849–1850 Afghan Conquest of Balkh
- 1855–1856 Conquest of Kandahar
- 1856 Second Herat War
- 1856–1857 Khost rebellion (1856–1857)
- 1859 Afghan Conquest of Kunduz
- 1862–1863 Herat campaign of 1862–1863
- 1863–1869 Afghan Civil War (1863–1869)
- 1878–1880 Second Anglo-Afghan War
- 1885 Panjdeh incident
- 1888–1893 Hazara genocide
  - 1889 Battle of Sheikh Ali (1889)
  - 1893 Battle of Uruzgan
- 1912 Khost rebellion (1912)
- 1913 Urtatagai conflict (1913)
- 1916–1934 Basmachi movement
  - 1930 Red Army intervention in Afghanistan (1930)
- 1919 Third Anglo-Afghan War
- 1923 Alizai rebellion of 1923
- 1924–1925 Khost rebellion (1924–1925)
- 1925–1926 Urtatagai conflict (1925–1926)
- 1928–1929 Afghan Civil War (1928–1929)
- 1944–1947 Afghan tribal revolts of 1944–1947
- 1945–1946 1945 Hazara Rebellion
- 1949–present Afghanistan–Pakistan border skirmishes
  - 2017 2017 Afghanistan–Pakistan border skirmish
  - 2024–present 2024 Afghanistan–Pakistan skirmishes
- 1949 1949 Hazara Rebellion
- 1973 1973 Afghan coup d'état
- 1975 1975 Panjshir Valley uprising
- 1978–present Afghan conflict
  - 1978 Saur Revolution
  - 1979 1979 uprisings in Afghanistan
    - 1979 1979 Herat uprising
    - 1979–1981 1979 Hazara Uprising
    - 1979 Chindawol uprising
    - 1979 Bala Hissar uprising
  - 1979–1989 Soviet–Afghan War
  - 1989–1992 Afghan Civil War (1989–1992)
  - 1992–1996 Afghan Civil War (1992–1996)
  - 1996–2001 Afghan Civil War (1996–2001)
  - 2001–2021 War in Afghanistan (2001–2021)
    - 2001 United States invasion of Afghanistan
    - 2006–2014 Helmand province campaign
    - 2009–2014 Counterinsurgency in Northern Afghanistan
- 2015–present Islamic State–Taliban conflict
- 2021–present Republican insurgency in Afghanistan

=== Bangladesh ===
- 550–560 Gauda–Gupta War
- Varendra rebellion
- 1303 Conquest of Sylhet
- 1324 Tughlaq campaign of Bengal
- 1415–1420 Bengal–Jaunpur confrontation
- 1498 Bengal–Kamata War
- 1512–1516 Bengal–Mrauk U War (1512–1516)
- 1530–1666 Mrauk U invasion of Chittagong
- 1572–1612 Mughal conquest of Bengal
- 1613 Conquest of Bhulua
- 1642–1698 Dano-Mughal War
- 1665 Mughal conquest of Chittagong
- 1756–1763 Seven Years' War
  - 1763–1765 Bengal War
- 1763–1800 Sannyasi rebellion
- 1782 Muharram Rebellion
- 1830s–1860s Faraizi uprisings
- 1830–1831 Titumir Rebellion
- 1930 Chittagong armoury raid
- 1937–1950 Tanka movement
- 1946–1947 Tebhaga movement
- 1948–present Rohingya conflict
  - 1991–1992 Operation Clean and Beautiful Nation
- 1949–1950 Nachole Uprising
- 1971 Bangladesh Liberation War
  - 1971 Indo-Pakistani War of 1971
- 1972 Liberation of Mirpur
- 1972 1972 Bangladesh Rifles mutiny
- 1972–1975 1972–1975 Bangladesh insurgency
- 1975 15 August 1975 Bangladesh coup d'état
- 1975 3 November 1975 Bangladesh coup d'état
- 1975 7 November 1975 Bangladesh coup d'état
- 1976 1976 Bogra mutiny
- 1977 1977 Bogra mutiny
- 1977 1977 Bangladesh Air Force mutiny
- 1977–present Chittagong Hill Tracts conflict
- 1980 1980 Bangladeshi coup attempt
- 1981 Assassination of Ziaur Rahman
- 1982 1982 Bangladesh coup d'état
- 1993–2022 Maoist insurgency in Bangladesh
- 1994 1994 Bangladesh Ansar mutiny
- 1996 1996 Bangladesh coup d'état attempt
- 1999–present Terrorism in Bangladesh
  - 2016 July 2016 Dhaka attack
- 2001–present Bangladesh–India border clashes
  - 2001 2001 Bangladesh–India border clashes
  - 2005 2005 Bangladesh-Indian border clash
  - 2008 2008 Bangladesh-Indian border clash
  - 2013 2013 Bangladesh-Indian border clash
  - 2019 2019 Bangladesh-Indian border clash
- 2002–2003 Operation Clean Heart
- 2008 2008 Bangladesh–Myanmar naval standoff
- 2009 2009 Bangladesh Rifles revolt
- 2011 2011 Bangladesh coup d'état attempt
- 2018–2019 Bangladesh drug war
- 2025–present Operation Devil Hunt

=== Bhutan ===
- 1634 Second Battle of Simtokha Dzong
- 1864–1865 Duar War
- 1954–present Insurgency in Northeast India
  - 2003 2003 South Bhutan clashes
  - 2003–2004 Operation All Clear

=== India ===
==== Bharathvarsha ====
- c. 5300 BC Kurukshetra War

==== Bharat ====
- c. 14th century BCE Battle of the Ten Kings
- 535–323 BC Achaemenid conquest of the Indus Valley

==== Magadha ====
- 544–400 BC Avanti–Magadhan War
- 540–535 BC Magadha–Anga war
- 484–468 BC Magadha–Vajji war

==== Nanda Empire ====
- 323–321 BC Nanda–Mauryan War

==== Maurya Empire ====
- 336–323 BC Wars of Alexander the Great
  - 327–325 BC Indian campaign of Alexander the Great
- 323–321 BC Nanda–Mauryan War
- 305–303 BC Seleucid–Mauryan War
- 265–264 BC Kalinga War

==== Shunga Empire ====
- 180s–113 BC Shunga–Greek War

==== Satavahana dynasty ====
- 15 – 2nd century Saka–Satavahana Wars

==== Kushan Empire ====
- c. 2nd century CE Kanishka's Central Asian campaign

==== Vakataka dynasty ====
- 335–413 Gupta–Saka Wars

==== Gupta Empire ====
- 335–413 Gupta–Saka Wars
- 335–375 Campaigns of Samudragupta
- 498 First Battle of Eran
- 515 Aulikara−Hunnic War
- 510 Second Battle of Eran
- 528 Battle of Sondani
- 550–560 Gauda–Gupta War

==== Pandya dynasty ====
- 190 Battle of Venni
- 830 Battle of Tellaru
- 862 Anuradhapura invasion of Pandya
- 879 Battle of Thirupurambiyam
- 1169–1177 Pandyan Civil War (1169–1177)
- 1188 Battle of Nettur
- 1311 Malik Kafur's invasion of the Pandya kingdom

==== Pallava dynasty ====
- 618–619 Battle of Narmada
- 618–619 Battle of Pullalur
- 642 Battle of Vatapi
- 642 Battle of Manimangala
- 992–1120 Chola–Chalukya Wars

==== Chalukya dynasty ====
- 618–619 Battle of Narmada
- 618–619 Battle of Pullalur
- 642 Battle of Vatapi
- 642 Battle of Manimangala
- 992–1120 Chola–Chalukya Wars

==== Pratihara dynasty ====
- 712–740 Umayyad campaigns in India
- 785–816 Tripartite Struggle
- 973–1167 Ghaznavid campaigns in India

==== Pala Empire ====
- Varendra rebellion
- 785–816 Tripartite Struggle
- 839–848 Devapala's Conflict with Tibetans
- Campaign against Pratiharas
- 1019–1021 Chola Expedition of the Ganges

==== Rashtrakuta Empire ====
- 712–740 Umayyad campaigns in India
- 785–816 Tripartite Struggle

==== Chola Empire ====
- 948–949 Battle of Takkolam
- 988 Battle of Kandalur Salai
- 992–1120 Chola–Chalukya Wars
- 1017–1018 Chola conquest of the Anuradhapura Kingdom
- 1025–1026 Chola invasion of Srivijaya
- 1097 Chola invasion of Kalinga (1097)
- 1110 Chola invasion of Kalinga (1110)
- 1188 Battle of Nettur

==== Delhi Sultanate ====
- 1206–1337 Mongol conquests
  - 1221–1308 Mongol invasions of India
- 1222–1229 Battle of Bhutala
- 1243 Battle of Katasin
- 1277–1281 Balban's campaign of Bengal
- 1291 Capture of Jhain
- 1293 Alauddin Khalji's raid on Bhilsa
- 1296 Alauddin Khalji's raid on Devagiri
- 1297–1298 Khalji invasion of Mithila
- 1299–1304 Alauddin Khalji's conquest of Gujarat
- 1301 Alauddin Khalji's conquest of Ranthambore
- 1301 Rebellions against Alauddin Khalji
- 1303 Siege of Chittorgarh (1303)
- 1305 Alauddin Khalji's conquest of Malwa
- 1308 Alauddin Khalji's conquest of Devagiri
- 1308 Siege of Siwana
- 1310 Siege of Warangal (1310)
- 1311 Alauddin Khalji's conquest of Jalore
- 1311 Siege of Dwarasamudra
- 1318 Siege of Warangal (1318)
- 1321–1521 Mewar–Delhi conflicts
- 1323 Siege of Warangal (1323)
- 1320 Battle of Saraswati
- 1320 Battle of Lahrawat
- 1324 Tughlaq campaign of Bengal
- 1326–1327 Siege of Kampili
- 1346–1347 Rebellion of Ismail Mukh
- 1353–1359 Ekdala Wars
- 1370–1508 Timurid conquests and invasions
  - 1398 Sack of Delhi (1398)
- 1361–1370 Siege of Kangra Fort
- 1421–1432 Jasrat's invasions of Delhi Sultanate
- 1501–1507 Lodi–Tomaras War
- 1526 Battle of Hisar Firoza

==== Bengal Sultanate ====
- 1206–1682 Muslim invasions of Assam
  - 1257 Yuzbak Khan's invasion of Kamarupa
  - 1498 Bengal–Kamata War
  - 1532–1533 Turbak's invasion of Assam
- 1353–1359 Ekdala Wars
- 1415–1420 Bengal–Jaunpur confrontation
- 1498 Bengal–Kamata War
- 1512–1516 Bengal–Mrauk U War (1512–1516)
- 1534 Battle of Surajgarh
- 1568 Bengal Sultanate conquest of Orissa
- 1572–1612 Mughal conquest of Bengal

==== Rajput Confederacy ====
- 1175–1206 Ghurid campaigns in India
- 1197 Battle of Kasahrada (1197)
- 1222–1229 Battle of Bhutala
- 1293 Alauddin Khalji's raid on Bhilsa
- 1299–1304 Alauddin Khalji's conquest of Gujarat
- 1301 Alauddin Khalji's conquest of Ranthambore
- 1305 Alauddin Khalji's conquest of Malwa
- 1311 Alauddin Khalji's conquest of Jalore
- 1321–1521 Mewar–Delhi conflicts
- 1389–1489 Jaunpur–Bhojpur War
- 1437–1520 Mewar–Malwa conflicts
- 1446 Battle of Mandalgarh and Banas
- 1520 Rana Sanga's invasion of Gujarat
- 1527–1779 Mughal–Rajput wars
  - 1527 Battle of Khanwa
- 1532–1535 Siege of Chittorgarh (1535)
- 1686–1688 Battle of Bhangani
- 1747 Battle of Rajamahal
- 1748 Battle of Bagru
- 1759 Battle of Kakkor
- 1787 Battle of Lalsot

==== Kashmir Sultanate ====
- 1338–1339 Shah Mir–Lohara War
- 1419–1420 Kashmir Civil War (1419–1420)
- 1421–1432 Jasrat's invasions of Delhi Sultanate
- 1585–1589 Mughal conquest of Kashmir

==== Vijayanagara Empire ====
- 1362–1367 Bahmani–Vijayanagara War (1362–1367)
- 1365–1370 Kampana's invasion of Madurai
- 1375–1378 Bahmani–Vijayanagar War (1375–1378)
- 1398 Bahmani–Vijayanagar War (1398)
- 1406 War of the Goldsmith's Daughter
- 1417–1419 Bahmani–Vijayanagar War (1417–1419)
- 1423 Siege of Vijayanagar
- 1443 Bahmani–Vijayanagar War (1443)
- 1505 Yusuf Adil Shah's Invasion of Vijayanagara
- 1506–1659 Adil Shahi–Portuguese conflicts
- 1509–1512 Krishnadevaraya's Bahmani expedition
- 1520 Battle of Raichur
- 1538–1560 Ottoman–Portuguese conflicts (1538–1560)
- 1542–1543 Vijayanagara Civil War (1542–1543)
- 1553–1554 Saif Ain-ul-Mulk's Rebellion
- 1565 Battle of Talikota
- 1617–1694 Madurai–Mysore Wars

==== Bahmani Kingdom ====
- 1362–1367 Bahmani–Vijayanagara War (1362–1367)
- 1375–1378 Bahmani–Vijayanagar War (1375–1378)
- 1398 Bahmani–Vijayanagar War (1398)
- 1406 War of the Goldsmith's Daughter
- 1417–1419 Bahmani–Vijayanagar War (1417–1419)
- 1423 Siege of Vijayanagar
- 1425–1466 Malwa–Bahmani Wars
- 1429–1931 Konkan War
- 1443 Bahmani–Vijayanagar War (1443)
- 1458 Battle of Devarakonda
- 1461 Gajapati invasion of Bidar
- 1475–1481 Bahmani invasion of Orissa
- 1509–1512 Krishnadevaraya's Bahmani expedition

==== Gujarat Sultanate ====
- 1505–1517 Mamluk–Portuguese conflicts
- 1508–1573 Gujarati–Portuguese conflicts
  - 1508 Battle of Chaul
  - 1509 Battle of Diu
  - 1531 Siege of Diu (1531)
  - 1538 Siege of Diu (1538)
  - 1546 Siege of Diu (1546)
  - 1547 Battle of Bharuch
  - 1559 Portuguese conquest of Daman
- 1520 Rana Sanga's invasion of Gujarat

==== Kingdom of Calicut ====
- 15th–16th century Calicut–Portuguese conflicts
  - 1500–1513 First Luso-Malabarese War
  - 1526 Siege of Calicut (1526)
- 1666–1758 Dutch–Zamorin conflicts

==== Ahmadnagar Sultanate ====
- 1543 Battle of Kalyani (1543)
- 1543 Vijayanagar Invasion of Bijapur (1543)
- 1543 Siege of Ahmednagar (1543)
- 1547–1548 Ahmednagar invasion of Bidar
- 1549 Battle of Kalyani (1549)
- 1549 Siege of Paranda
- 1552 Vijaynagara Invasion of Bijapur (1552)
- 1557–1558 Siege of Gulbarga
- 1558–1559 Siege of Ahmednagar (1558–1559)
- 1561–1562 Siege of Ahmednagar (1561–1562)
- 1565 Battle of Talikota
- 1570–1575 War of the League of the Indies
- 1624 Battle of Bhatvadi
- 1633 Siege of Daulatabad
- 1634 Siege of Parenda (1634)

==== Mughal Empire ====
- 1206–1682 Muslim invasions of Assam
  - 1615–1682 Ahom–Mughal conflicts
- 1535–1693 Mughal–Portuguese conflicts
- 1526 First Battle of Panipat
- 1526 Siege of Sambhal
- 1527–1779 Mughal–Rajput wars
  - 1527 Battle of Khanwa
- 1528 Battle of Chanderi
- 1556 Battle of Tughlaqabad
- 1556 Second Battle of Panipat
- 1557–1739 Mughal-Persian Wars
- 1557 Siege of Mankot (1557)
- 1560–1570 Mughal conquest of Malwa
- 1564–1567 Mughal conquest of Garha
- 1572–1573 Mughal conquest of Gujarat
- 1606 Battle of Dewair (1606)
- 1615–1682 Ahom–Mughal conflicts
- 1621 Battle of Rohilla
- 1634–1638 Battle of Amritsar (1634)
- 1634 Battle of Amritsar (1634)
- 1634 Battle of Lahira
- 1635 Battle of Kartarpur
- 1638 Battle of Kiratpur
- 1642–1698 Dano-Mughal War
- 1648 Tranquebar Rebellion
- 1649–1653 Mughal–Safavid war (1649–53)
- 1658–1659 Mughal war of succession (1658–1659)
- 1661–1676 Shivaji's invasions of Janjira
- 1679–1684 Tibet–Ladakh–Mughal war
- 1681–1707 Deccan wars
- 1682 Battle of Anandpur (1682)
- 1685 Battle of Anandpur (1685)
- 1686–1690 Anglo-Mughal war (1686–1690)
- 1687–1688 Anglo-Siamese War
- 1691 Battle of Nadaun
- 1696 Battle of Guler (1696)
- 1699 Battle of Anandpur (1699)
- 1700 Battle of Anandpur (1700)
- 1700 First siege of Anandpur
- 1702 Battle of Basoli
- 1702 First battle of Chamkaur
- 1704 Second siege of Anandpur
- 1704 Battle of Chamkaur
- 1705 Battle of Muktsar
- 1707–1709 Mughal war of succession (1707–1709)
- 1709 Battle of Amritsar (1709)
- 1709 Battle of Sonipat
- 1709 Battle of Samana
- 1709 Battle of Kapuri
- 1710 Battle of Sadhaura
- 1710 Battle of Chappar Chiri
- 1710 Siege of Sirhind
- 1710 Siege of Jalalabad (1710)
- 1710 Battle of Bhilowal
- 1710 Battle of Rahon
- 1710 Battle of Thanesar (1710)
- 1710 Second Battle of Lohgarh
- 1712–1720 Mughal war of succession (1712–1720)
- 1712 Battle of Jammu
- 1713 Second Battle of Lohgarh
- 1714 Battle of Kiri Pathan
- 1715 Battle of Gurdas Nangal
- 1715 Siege of Gurdaspur
- 1720s – 1747 Naderian Wars
  - 1738–1739 Nader Shah's invasion of India
- 1720 Battle of Balapur
- 1724 Battle of Shakar Kheda
- 1729 Battle of Bundelkhand
- 1730–1731 Battle of Thikriwala
- 1736 Battle of Basarke
- 1738 Battle of Amritsar (1738)
- 1739 Battle of Karnal
- 1740 Chanda Sahib's invasion of Travancore
- 1741 Battle of Gangwana
- 1743 Siege of Trichinopoly (1743)
- 1744–1763 Carnatic wars
  - 1744–1748 First Carnatic War
- 1748–1769 Indian campaign of Ahmad Shah Durrani
- 1748 Siege of Amritsar (1748)
- 1748–1749 Siege of Ram Rauni
- 1753 Safdarjung's rebellion
- 1757 Battle of Delhi (1757)
- 1761 Capture of Agra
- 1764–1788 Sikh attacks on Delhi
- 1770 Raid of Panipat (1770)
- 1772 Siege of Kunjpura (1772)
- 1779 Siege of Patiala (1779)

==== Maratha Empire ====
- 1681–1707 Mughal–Maratha wars
- 1683–1684 Maratha–Portuguese War (1683–1684)
- 1715 Battle of Pilsud
- 1729–1732 Luso–Maratha War (1729–1732)
- 1737 Battle of Bhopal
- 1742–1751 Maratha invasions of Bengal
  - 1742 First Maratha invasion of Bengal
  - 1743 Second Maratha invasion of Bengal
- 1758–1761 Afghan–Maratha War
- 1761 Third Battle of Panipat
- 1766–1798 Maratha–Sikh clashes
- 1767–1799 Anglo-Mysore wars
  - 1767–1769 First Anglo-Mysore War
  - 1780–1784 Second Anglo-Mysore War
  - 1790–1792 Third Anglo-Mysore War
  - 1798–1799 Fourth Anglo-Mysore War
- 1759–1787 Maratha–Mysore wars
- 18th–19th century Anglo-Maratha Wars
  - 1775–1782 First Anglo-Maratha War
  - 1803–1805 Second Anglo-Maratha War
  - 1817–1819 Third Anglo-Maratha War
  - 1843 Gwalior campaign
- 1787 Battle of Lalsot
- 1790 Battle of Patan
- 1795 Battle of Kharda
- 1799 Battle of Fatehpur (1799)

==== Sikh Confederacy ====
- 1748–1837 Afghan–Sikh Wars
- 1766–1798 Maratha–Sikh clashes
- 1774 Battle of Jammu (1774)

==== Sikh Empire ====
- 1748–1837 Afghan–Sikh Wars
- 1809 Nepal–Sikh war
- 1841–1842 Dogra–Tibetan war
- 1845–1846 First Anglo-Sikh War
- 1848–1849 Second Anglo-Sikh War

==== Company rule in India ====
- 1756–1763 Seven Years' War
- 1763–1765 Bengal War
- 1763–1800 Sannyasi rebellion
- 1766–1799 Anglo-Mysore Wars
  - 1766–1769 First Anglo-Mysore War
  - 1780–1784 Second Anglo-Mysore War
  - 1789–1792 Third Anglo-Mysore War
  - 1798–1799 Fourth Anglo-Mysore War
- 1766–1834 Chuar Rebellion
  - 1832–1833 Bhumij Revolt
- 1769–1805 Moamoria rebellion
- 1773–1774 First Rohilla War
- 1777–1818 Anglo-Maratha Wars
  - 1777–1783 First Anglo-Maratha War
  - 1803–1805 Second Anglo-Maratha War
  - 1817–1818 Third Anglo-Maratha War
- 1781 Banaras Uprising of 1781
- 1781 1781 revolt in Bihar
- 1786 Revolt of Radharam
- 1794 Second Rohilla War
- 1794 Battle of Padmanabham
- 1799–1805 Polygar Wars
- 1806 Vellore Mutiny
- 1808–1809 Travancore rebellion
- 1813–1859 Channar revolt
- 1816–1826 Burmese invasions of Assam
- 1817–1818 Paika Rebellion
- 1824–1885 Anglo-Burmese Wars
  - 1824–1826 First Anglo-Burmese War
    - 1824 Barrackpore mutiny of 1824
- 1828 Ahom rebellion
- 1829–1833 Anglo-Khasi War
- 1830 Nagar revolt
- 1831–1832 Kol uprising
- 1845–1846 First Anglo-Sikh War
- 1848–1849 Second Anglo-Sikh War
- 1851 Battle of Kikrüma
- 1855–1856 Santhal rebellion
- 1857–1858 Indian Rebellion of 1857

==== British Raj ====
- 1859 Battle of Aberdeen (Andaman Islands)
- 1861 Phulaguri Uprising
- 1864–1865 Duar War
- 1867 Andaman Islands expedition
- 1879–1880 Rampa rebellion of 1879
- 1882 Salem riots of 1882
- 1888 Sikkim Expedition
- 1890–1895 Lushai Rising
- 1891 Anglo-Manipur War
- 1895 Kalugumalai riots of 1895
- 1897–1941 Bijolia movement
- 1910 Bastar rebellion
- 1914–1920 Tana Bhagat Movement
- 1914–1918 World War I
  - 1914–1918 Asian and Pacific theatre of World War I
- 1917–1919 Kuki Rebellion of 1917–1919
- 1920 Sultana Daku 1920 Revolt
- 1921–1922 Malabar rebellion
- 1922–1924 Rampa Rebellion of 1922
- 1939–1945 World War II
  - 1940–1945 Indian Ocean campaign
      - 1940–1942 Japanese raiders in the Indian Ocean
      - 1942–1945 Japanese occupation of the Andaman and Nicobar Islands
      - 1942 Operation Stab
  - 1941–1945 Pacific War
    - 1942–1945 Burma Campaign
      - 1944 Burma campaign (1944)
- 1941 Kayyur incident
- 1946–1947 Tebhaga movement
- 1946–1951 Telangana Rebellion
- 1946 Royal Indian Navy mutiny
- 1946 Punnapra-Vayalar uprising

==== Republic of India ====
- 1946–1951 Telangana Rebellion
- 1947–present Indo-Pakistani wars and conflicts
  - 1947–1948 Indo-Pakistani War of 1947
  - 1965 Operation Desert Hawk
  - 1965 Indo-Pakistani War of 1965
  - 1971 Bangladesh Liberation War
    - 1971 Indo-Pakistani War of 1971
  - 1984–2003 Siachen conflict
  - 1999 Kargil War
  - 1999 1999 Pakistani Breguet 1150 Atlantic shootdown
  - 2001–2002 2001–2002 India–Pakistan standoff
  - 2008 2008 India–Pakistan standoff
  - 2011 2011 India–Pakistan border skirmish
  - 2013 2013 India–Pakistan border skirmishes
  - 2014–2015 2014–2015 India–Pakistan border skirmishes
  - 2016–2018 2016–2018 India–Pakistan border skirmishes
    - 2016 2016 Indian Line of Control strike
  - 2019 2019 India–Pakistan border skirmishes
    - 2019 2019 Jammu and Kashmir airstrikes
  - 2020–2021 2020–21 India–Pakistan border skirmishes
  - 2023 2023 India–Pakistan border skirmishes
  - 2025 2025 India–Pakistan crisis
    - 2025 2025 India–Pakistan conflict
- 1947–1948 Annexation of Junagadh
- 1948 Annexation of Hyderabad
- 1954–present Insurgency in Northeast India
  - 1954–present Insurgency in Arunachal Pradesh
  - 1958–present Ethnic conflict in Nagaland
  - 1966–1986 Mizo National Front uprising
  - 1980–present Insurgency in Manipur
  - 1989–2024 Insurgency in Tripura
  - 1990–present Assam separatist movements
  - 1992–present Insurgency in Meghalaya
- 1954 Coup d'état of Yanaon
- 1954 Annexation of Dadra and Nagar Haveli
- 1961 Annexation of Goa
- 1962 Sino-Indian War
- 1967–present Naxalite–Maoist insurgency
- 1967 Nathu La and Cho La clashes
- 1978–1995 Insurgency in Punjab
  - 1984 Operation Blue Star
- 1986–1987 Sumdorong Chu standoff
- 1989–present Insurgency in Jammu and Kashmir
- 1991 1991 Lokhandwala Complex shootout
- 2001–present Bangladesh–India border clashes
  - 2001 2001 Bangladesh–India border clashes
  - 2005 2005 Bangladesh-Indian border clash
  - 2008 2008 Bangladesh-Indian border clash
  - 2013 2013 Bangladesh-Indian border clash
  - 2019 2019 Bangladesh-Indian border clash
- 2011 Battle of Minicoy Island
- 2013 2013 Depsang standoff
- 2013 Operation Puttur
- 2017 2017 China–India border standoff
- 2020–2021 2020–2021 China–India skirmishes

=== Iran ===
==== Elam ====
- 655–639 BC Assyrian conquest of Elam

==== Achaemenid Empire ====
- 553–550 BC Medo-Persian conflict

==== Macedonian Empire ====
- 335–323 BC Wars of Alexander the Great

==== Seleucid Empire ====
- 322–275 BC Wars of the Diadochi

==== Parthian Empire ====
- 238–129 BC Seleucid–Parthian wars
  - 238 BC Parni conquest of Parthia
  - 209 BC Battle of Mount Labus
  - 129 BC Battle of Ecbatana
- 66 BC – 217 AD Roman–Parthian Wars
  - 40–33 BC Antony's Parthian War
  - 161 – 166 Roman–Parthian War of 161–166
  - 216 – 217 Parthian war of Caracalla

==== Sasanian Empire ====
- 224 Battle of Hormozdgan
- 230–240 Sasanian conquest of the Suren Kingdom
- 350 Shapur II's invasion of Armenia (350)
- 363 Julian's Persian expedition
- 363–371 Armeno-Sassanid War of 363–371
- 451 Battle of Avarayr
- 484–565 Hephthalite–Sasanian Wars
  - 484 Sukhra's Hephthalite campaign
- 502–628 Byzantine–Sasanian wars
  - 440 Byzantine–Sasanian War of 440
  - 572–591 Byzantine–Sasanian War of 572–591
- 588–589 Perso-Turkic war of 588–589
- 589–591 Sasanian civil war of 589–591
- 614–616 Hephthalite–Gokturk raids of 614–616
- 628–632 Sasanian civil war of 628–632
- 633–651 Muslim conquest of Persia
  - 637–642 Muslim conquest of Khuzestan
  - 638–651 Arab conquest of Fars
  - 643–651 Muslim conquest of Northern Persia
  - 651–654 Muslim conquest of Khorasan

==== Rashidun Caliphate ====
- 656–661 First Fitna

==== Umayyad Caliphate ====
- 680–692 Second Fitna
- 743–750 Third Fitna
  - 747–750 Abbasid revolution

==== Abbasid Caliphate ====
- 755 Sunpadh Rebellion
- 781–805 Tabaristan uprising
- 809–827 Fourth Fitna
- 816–837 Babak Khorramdin Revolt
- 864–1041 Caspian expeditions of the Rus'
- 874 Battle of al-Baida
- 900 Battle of Gorgan (900)
- 940 Battle of Iskhabad

==== Ghaznavid dynasty ====
- 999–1002 Ghaznavid–Saffarid war
- 999–1004 Ghaznavid-Samanid war
- 1006–1008 Kara-Khanid invasion of Khorasan
- 1012–1034 Ghaznavid campaigns in Persia

==== Seljuk Empire ====
- 1035 Battle of Nasa (1035)
- 1038 Battle of Nishapur (1038)
- 1038 Battle of Sarakhs (1038)
- 1040 Battle of Dandanaqan
- 1048–1308 Byzantine–Seljuk wars
- 1063 Battle of Damghan (1063)
- 1064–1213 Georgian–Seljuk wars
  - 1209–1211 Georgian campaign against the Eldiguzids
- 1073 Battle of Kerj Abu Dulaf
- 1090–1194 Nizari–Seljuk conflicts

==== Ghurid Empire ====
- 1200–1201 Ghurid conquest of Khorasan

==== Khwarazmian dynasty ====
- 1206–1368 Mongol invasions and conquests
  - 1219–1258 Mongol conquest of Persia and Mesopotamia
    - 1219–1221 Mongol invasion of the Khwarazmian Empire
    - 1253–1256 Mongol campaign against the Nizaris

==== Ilkhanate ====
- 1260–1294 Division of the Mongol Empire
  - 1260–1264 Toluid Civil War
    - 1262 Berke–Hulegu war
  - 1268–1301 Kaidu–Kublai war
- 1314–1318 Esen Buqa–Ayurbarwada war
- 1336 Battle of Jaghatu
- 1342 Battle of Zava

==== Timurid Empire ====
- 1370–1508 Timurid conquests and invasions
- 1405–1411 Timurid War of Succession
- 1448–1449 Babur Mirza's Invasion of Khorasan
- 1459 Battle of Sarakhs (1459)
- 1478 Battle of Khoy (1478)

==== Safavid dynasty ====
- 1487–1524 Campaigns of Ismail I
  - 1501 Siege of Tabriz (1501)
  - 1503 Battle of Hamadan (1503)
- 1502–1788 Persian–Uzbek wars
  - 1578 Uzbek invasion of Khorasan (1578)
- 1505–1517 Ottoman–Persian War (1505–1517)
- 1507–1625 Portuguese–Safavid wars
  - 1507 Portuguese conquest of Hormuz
  - 1614 Capture of Cambarão
  - 1621–1622 Anglo-Persian capture of Qeshm
  - 1622 Anglo-Persian capture of Hormuz
- 1532–1555 Ottoman–Safavid War (1532–1555)
- 1598–1663 Dutch–Portuguese War
- 1609–1610 Siege of Dimdim
- 1623–1639 Ottoman–Safavid War (1623–1639)
- 1722 Battle of Gulnabad
- 1722 Siege of Isfahan
- 1721 Sack of Shamakhi
- 1726–1727 Ottoman–Hotaki War (1726–1727)
- 1720s–1747 Campaigns of Nader Shah
  - 1726–1727 Khorasan campaign of Nader Shah
  - 1727–1728 Sabzevar expedition
  - 1729–1730 Restoration of Tahmasp II to the Safavid throne
  - 1730–1734 Rebellion of Sheikh Ahmad Madani
  - 1730–1732 Herat campaign of 1730–1732
  - 1730–1735 Ottoman–Persian War (1730–1735)
  - 1733–1734 Mohammad Khan Baluch's Rebellion

==== Afsharid dynasty ====
- 1720s–1747 Campaigns of Nader Shah
  - 1744 Moḥammad Taqi Khan Shirazi's Rebellion
- 1730s–1747 Afsharid conquests in the Persian Gulf and Oman
- 1743–1746 Ottoman–Persian War (1743–1746)
- 1747–1796 Division of the Afsharid Empire
- 1749–1751 Durrani Campaign to Khorasan (1749–1751)
- 1754–1755 Durrani Campaign to Khorasan (1754–1755)

==== Zand dynasty ====
- 1759 Battle of Astarabad (1759)
- 1765 Persian–Dutch War
- 1775–1776 Ottoman–Persian War (1775–1776)
- 1794 Siege of Kerman

==== Qajar dynasty ====
- 1804–1813 Russo-Persian War (1804–1813)
- 1821–1823 Ottoman–Persian War (1821–1823)
- 1826–1828 Russo-Persian War (1826–1828)
- 1838–1915 British occupation of Bushehr
- 1848–1849 Battle of Fort Tabarsi
- 1856–1857 Anglo-Persian War
- 1879–1880 Uprising of Sheikh Ubeydullah
- 1905–1911 Persian Constitutional Revolution
- 1906 Ottoman invasion of Persia (1906)
- 1911–1913 Revolt of Salar-al-Daulah
- 1911–1921 Swedish volunteers in Persia
  - 1913–1915 Shiraz expedition
- 1914–1918 World War I
  - 1914–1918 Middle Eastern theatre of World War I
    - 1914–1918 Persian campaign (World War I)
- 1915–1921 Jungle Movement of Gilan
- 1920 Mohammad Khiabani's uprising
- 1921 1921 Persian coup d'état
- 1918–present Kurdish separatism in Iran
  - 1918–1922 Simko Shikak revolt (1918–1922)
- 1922– Arab separatism in Khuzestan
  - 1922–1924 Sheikh Khazal rebellion

==== Pahlavi dynasty ====
- 1918–present Kurdish separatism in Iran
  - 1926 Simko Shikak revolt (1926)
  - 1931 Jafar Sultan revolt
  - 1941–1944 Hama Rashid revolt
  - 1945–1946 Iran crisis of 1946
  - 1967 1967 Kurdish revolt in Iran
- 1929–1933 Persian tribal uprisings of 1929
- 1935 Goharshad Mosque rebellion
- 1939–1945 World War II
  - 1941 Anglo-Soviet invasion of Iran
- 1953 1953 Iranian coup d'état
- 1971 Seizure of Abu Musa and the Greater and Lesser Tunbs
- 1974–1975 1974–1975 Shatt al-Arab conflict

==== Islamic Republic of Iran ====
- 1918–present Kurdish separatism in Iran
  - 1979–1996 1979 Kurdish rebellion in Iran
  - 1984–1991 KDPI–Komala conflict
  - 1989–1996 KDPI insurgency (1989–96)
  - 2004–present Iran–PJAK conflict
  - 2016–2023 Western Iran clashes (2016–2023)
  - 2026-present Western Iran clashes (2026–present)
- 1921–present Kurdish–Turkish conflict
  - 1978–2025 Kurdistan Workers' Party insurgency
- 1922–present Arab separatism in Khuzestan
  - 1979 1979 Khuzestan insurgency
- 1948–present Balochistan conflict
  - 2004–present Sistan and Baluchestan insurgency
- 1978–1979 Iranian Revolution
  - 1979–1983 Consolidation of the Iranian Revolution
    - 1979–1980 1979 Turkmen rebellion in Iran
    - 1979–1981 Iran hostage crisis
    - 1980 Nojeh coup plot
    - 1982 1982 Amol uprising
- 1980–1989 Iran–Iraq War
- 2004 2004 Iranian seizure of Royal Navy personnel
- 2007 2007 Iranian arrest of Royal Navy personnel
- 2009 2009 Afghanistan–Iran clash
- 2011–2012 2011–2012 Strait of Hormuz dispute
- 2016 2016 U.S.–Iran naval incident
- 2021 2021 Afghanistan–Iran clashes
- 2023 2023 Iran drone attacks
- 2023 2023 Afghanistan–Iran clash
- 2023–present Middle Eastern crisis
  - 2024 2024 Iran–Israel conflict
  - 2025 Iran–Israel war
  - 2026 2026 Israeli–United States strikes on Iran

=== Maldives ===
- 1521–1650 Maldivian–Portuguese conflicts
- 1988 1988 Maldives coup attempt

=== Nepal ===
- 1744–1816 Unification of Nepal
  - 1744 Battle of Belkot
  - 1744 Battle of Nuwakot
  - 1762 Battle of Makwanpur (1762)
  - 1767 Battle of Sindhuli
  - 1767 Battle of Kirtipur
  - 1768 Battle of Kathmandu
  - 1768 Battle of Lalitpur
  - 1769 Battle of Bhaktapur
- 1814–1816 Anglo-Nepalese War
- 1847 Battle of Alau
- 1855–1856 Nepalese–Tibetan War
- 1885 1885 Nepal coup d'état
- 1950–1951 1951 Nepalese revolution
- 1960 1960 Nepal coup d'état
- 1996–2006 Nepal Civil War

=== Pakistan ===
- 336–323 BC Wars of Alexander the Great
  - 327–325 BC Indian campaign of Alexander the Great
- 622–750 Early Muslim conquests
- 1582–1612 Rind-Lashari War
- 1731 Battle of Kachhi
- 1748–1769 Indian campaign of Ahmad Shah Durrani
- 1749 Battle of Multan (1749)
- 1831 Battle of Balakot
- 1837 1837 Poonch Revolt
- 1843 British conquest of Sindh
- 1845–1846 First Anglo-Sikh War
- 1848–1849 Second Anglo-Sikh War
- 1851–1852 Mohmand Expeditions (1851–1852)
- 1852 Khagan Expedition
- 1863–1864 Ambela campaign
- 1868 Second Black Mountain Expedition
- 1888 Hazara Expedition of 1888
- 1895 Chitral Expedition
- 1897 Tochi Expedition
- 1897 Siege of Malakand
- 1897–1898 Tirah campaign
- 1900–1902 Mahsud Waziri blockade
- 1908 Mohmand Expedition of 1908
- 1914–1918 World War I
  - 1914–1918 Asian and Pacific theatre of World War I
    - 1914–1917 North-West Frontier Theatre of WWI
- 1919–1920 Waziristan campaign (1919–1920)
- 1921–1924 Waziristan campaign (1921–1924)
- 1925 Pink's War
- 1935 Mohmand campaign of 1935
- 1936–1939 Waziristan campaign (1936–1939)
- 1947 1947 Poonch rebellion
- 1947 1947 Gilgit rebellion
- 1947–present Sectarian violence in Pakistan
- 1947–present Indo-Pakistani wars and conflicts
  - 1947–1948 Indo-Pakistani War of 1947
  - 1965 Indo-Pakistani War of 1965
  - 1971 Bangladesh Liberation War
    - 1971 Indo-Pakistani War of 1971
  - 1959 1959 Canberra shootdown
  - 1984–2003 Siachen conflict
  - 1999 Kargil War
  - 2001–2002 2001–2002 India–Pakistan standoff
  - 2008 2008 India–Pakistan standoff
  - 2011 2011 India–Pakistan border skirmish
  - 2013 2013 India–Pakistan border skirmishes
  - 2014–2015 2014–2015 India–Pakistan border skirmishes
  - 2016–2018 2016–2018 India–Pakistan border skirmishes
    - 2016 2016 Indian Line of Control strike
  - 2019 2019 India–Pakistan border skirmishes
    - 2019 2019 Jammu and Kashmir airstrikes
  - 2020–2021 2020–2021 India–Pakistan border skirmishes
  - 2023 2023 India–Pakistan border skirmishes
  - 2025 2025 India–Pakistan crisis
    - 2025 2025 India–Pakistan conflict
- 1948–present Insurgency in Balochistan
  - 1948–1950 First Balochistan conflict
  - 1958–1960 Second Balochistan conflict
  - 1963–1969 Third Balochistan conflict
  - 1973–1977 1970s operation in Balochistan
- 1948–1954 Waziristan rebellion (1948–1954)
- 1949–present Afghanistan–Pakistan border skirmishes
  - 1959–1960 Dir campaign
  - 1960–1961 Bajaur Campaign
  - 2017 2017 Afghanistan–Pakistan border skirmish
  - 2024–presentAfghanistan–Pakistan clashes (2024–present)
  - 2025 2025 Afghanistan–Pakistan conflict
  - 2026 2026 Afghanistan–Pakistan war
- 1950–1955 PC Pak Search Sudhan Operation
- 1951 Rawalpindi conspiracy
- 1953 Lahore riots of 1953
- 1955–1956 1955 Poonch uprising
- 1958 1958 Pakistani military coup
- 1978–present MQM militancy
  - 1992–1994 Operation Clean-up
  - 1994–2016 MQM Violence (1994–2016)
    - 2012–2023 Lyari Operation
- 1973 1973 Pakistan coup attempt
- 1976 1976 Dir rebellion
- 1977 1977 Pakistani military coup
- 1979–1989 Soviet–Afghan War
- 1980 1980 Pakistan coup attempt
- 1984 1984 Pakistan coup attempt
- 1989–present Insurgency in Jammu and Kashmir
- 1994–1995 Malakand insurrection (1994–1995)
- 1995 1995 Pakistani coup attempt
- 1999 1999 Pakistani coup d'état
- 2003–present Insurgency in Sindh
- 2004–present Insurgency in Khyber Pakhtunkhwa
  - 2004–2018 Drone strikes in Pakistan
  - 2008–2012 Pakistan–United States skirmishes
- 2011 2011 Chitral cross-border attacks

=== Sri Lanka ===
- 162–161 BC Battle of Vijithapura
- 992–1017 Chola conquest of Anuradhapura
- 1084 Velakkara revolt
- 1157 Queen Sugala rebellion
- 1169–1177 Pandyan Civil War (1169–1177)
- mid-13th century Malay invasions of Sri Lanka
- 1410–1411 Ming-Kotte War
- 1518–1658 Sinhalese–Portuguese conflicts
  - 1560–1621 Portuguese conquest of the Jaffna kingdom
- 1598–1663 Dutch–Portuguese War
- 1670–1675 Kandyan–Dutch war (1670–1675)
- 1764–1766 Kandyan–Dutch war (1764–1766)
- 1796–1818 Kandyan Wars
- 1818 Great Rebellion of 1817–1818
- 1848 Matale Rebellion
- 1939–1945 World War II
  - 1940–1945 Indian Ocean Campaign
- 1962 1962 Ceylonese coup attempt
- 1971 1971 JVP Insurrection
- 1983–2009 Sri Lankan civil war
  - 1976–1987 Eelam War I
  - 1987–1989 1987–1989 JVP insurrection
  - 1987–1990 Indian intervention in the Sri Lankan Civil War
  - 1990–1995 Eelam War II
  - 1995–2002 Eelam War III
  - 2006–2009 Eelam War IV
- 2015 2015 alleged Sri Lankan coup attempt
- 2019 Sainthamaruthu shootout
- 2023–present Operation Yukthiya

== West Asia ==
=== Armenia ===
- c. 2492 BC Battle of Hayots Dzor
- 201–200 BC War of the Armenian Succession (201–200 BC)
- 88–63 BC Mithridatic Wars
  - 73–63 BC Third Mithridatic War
- 50–55 Iberian–Armenian War
- 54 BC – 217 AD Roman–Parthian Wars
  - 58 – 63 Roman–Parthian War of 58–63
- 54 BC – 628 AD Roman–Persian Wars
  - 337–361 Perso-Roman wars of 337–361
    - 350 Shapur II's invasion of Armenia (350)
- 335–336 Sanesan invasion of Armenia (335-336)
- 363–371 Armeno-Sasanian War of 363–371
- 543 Battle of Anglon
- 850–855 Armenian Revolt (850–855)
- 921 Battle of Sevan
- 1206–1368 Mongol invasions and conquests
  - 1220–1236 Mongol invasions of Georgia
- 1651–1828 Russo-Persian Wars
  - 1722–1723 Russo-Persian War (1722–1723)
  - 1796 Persian expedition of 1796
  - 1804–1813 Russo-Persian War (1804–1813)
- 1722–1730 Syunik rebellion
- 1800–1864 Russian conquest of the Caucasus
- 1905–1907 Russian Revolution of 1905
  - 1905–1906 Armenian–Tatar massacres of 1905–1906
- 1914–1918 World War I
  - 1914–1918 Middle Eastern theatre of World War I
    - 1914–1918 Caucasus campaign
- 1917–1922 Russian Civil War
  - 1917–1921 Southern Front of the Russian Civil War
    - 1918–1920 Armenian–Azerbaijani war (1918–1920)
      - 1920 Soviet invasion of Armenia
- 1918 Armeno-Georgian War
- 1919–1923 Turkish War of Independence
  - 1920 Turkish invasion of Armenia
- 1920 May Uprising
- 1988–present Nagorno-Karabakh conflict
  - 1988–1994 First Nagorno-Karabakh War
  - 2012 2012 Armenian–Azerbaijani border clashes
  - 2014 2014 Armenian–Azerbaijani clashes
  - 2018 2018 Armenian–Azerbaijani clashes
  - 2020 July 2020 Armenian–Azerbaijani clashes
  - 2020 Second Nagorno-Karabakh War
  - 2021–present Armenia–Azerbaijan border crisis (2021–present)
    - 2022 September 2022 Armenia–Azerbaijan clashes
- 2016 2016 Yerevan hostage crisis
- 2021 2021 Armenian political crisis
- 2023 September 2023 Armenian coup attempt allegations
- 2023 November 2023 Armenian coup attempt allegations
- 2024 2024 Armenian coup attempt allegations
- 2025 2025 Armenian coup attempt allegations

=== Azerbaijan ===
- 1064–1213 Georgian–Seljuk wars
  - 1117–1124 Georgian conquest of Shirvan
- 1206–1368 Mongol invasions and conquests
  - 1220–1236 Mongol invasions of Georgia
- 1514–1823 Ottoman–Persian Wars
  - 1578–1590 Ottoman–Safavid War (1578–1590)
- 1651–1828 Russo-Persian Wars
  - 1722–1723 Russo-Persian War (1722–1723)
  - 1796 Persian expedition of 1796
  - 1804–1813 Russo-Persian War (1804–1813)
  - 1826–1828 Russo-Persian War (1826–1828)
- 1800–1864 Russian conquest of the Caucasus
- 1914–1918 World War I
  - 1914–1918 Middle Eastern theatre of World War I
    - 1914–1918 Caucasus campaign
- 1917–1922 Russian Civil War
  - 1917–1921 Southern Front of the Russian Civil War
    - 1918–1920 Armenian–Azerbaijani war (1918–1920)
      - 1920 Red Army invasion of Azerbaijan
- 1988–present Nagorno-Karabakh conflict
  - 1988–1994 First Nagorno-Karabakh War
  - 2008 2008 Mardakert clashes
  - 2010 2010 Nagorno-Karabakh clashes
  - 2010 2010 Mardakert clashes
  - 2012 2012 Armenian–Azerbaijani border clashes
  - 2014 2014 Armenian–Azerbaijani clashes
  - 2016 2016 Nagorno-Karabakh conflict
  - 2018 2018 Armenian–Azerbaijani clashes
  - 2020 July 2020 Armenian–Azerbaijani clashes
  - 2020 Second Nagorno-Karabakh War
  - 2021–present Armenia–Azerbaijan border crisis (2021–present)
    - 2022 September 2022 Armenia–Azerbaijan clashes
    - 2022–2023 Blockade of Nagorno-Karabakh
  - 2023 2023 Azerbaijani offensive in Nagorno-Karabakh
- 1993 1993 Azerbaijani coup d'état
- 1995 1995 Azerbaijani coup attempt
- 2025 2025 Azerbaijani coup plot

=== Bahrain ===
- 656–661 First Fitna
- 1507–1625 Portuguese–Safavid wars
  - 1602 Safavid conquest of Bahrain
- 1529 Portuguese invasion of Bahrain
- 1717 1717 Omani invasion of Bahrain
- 1782–1783 Bani Utbah invasion of Bahrain
- 1867–1868 Qatari–Bahraini War
- 1939–1945 World War II
  - 1940–1945 Mediterranean and Middle East theatre of World War II
    - 1940 Bombing of Bahrain in World War II
- 2011 2011 Bahraini uprising
  - 2011 Saudi-led intervention in Bahrain
- 2011–present Insurgency in Bahrain

=== Cyprus ===
- c. 1275 BC – c. 1205 BC Battles of Alashiya
- 499–449 BC Greco-Persian Wars
  - 499–493 BC Ionian Revolt
- 477–449 BC Wars of the Delian League
- 1095–1303 Crusades
  - 1217–1221 Fifth Crusade
  - 1271–1272 Lord Edward's crusade
- 1228–1243 War of the Lombards
- 1368 Mamluk raid on Cyprus (1368)
- 1396–1718 Ottoman–Venetian wars
  - 1570–1573 Ottoman–Venetian War (1570–1573)
- 1424–1426 Mamluk campaigns against Cyprus (1424–1426)
- 1526–1791 Ottoman–Habsburg wars
- 1955–present Cyprus problem
  - 1955–1959 Cyprus Emergency
  - 1959–1974 Cyprus intercommunal violence
    - 1974 1974 Cypriot coup d'état
  - 1974 Turkish invasion of Cyprus
- 1978 Egyptian raid on Larnaca International Airport

=== Georgia ===
- 88–63 BC Mithridatic Wars
  - 73–63 BC Third Mithridatic War
- 54 BC – 628 AD Roman–Persian wars
  - 526–532 Iberian War
  - 602–628 Byzantine–Sasanian War of 602–628
- 541–562 Lazic War
- 622–750 Early Muslim conquests
  - 735–737 Umayyad invasion of Georgia
- 914 Sajid invasion of Georgia
- 1008–1103 Unification of the Georgian realm
- 1012–1199 Georgian–Shaddadid wars
- 1014–1204 Byzantine–Georgian wars
- 1064–1213 Georgian–Seljuk wars
- 1206–1368 Mongol invasions and conquests
  - 1220–1236 Mongol invasions of Georgia
- 1212 Rebellion in Pkhovi and Didoya
- 1225–1229 Khwarazmian–Georgian wars
- 1302–1303 Azat Mousa's invasion of Georgia
- 1370–1508 Timurid invasions and conquests
  - 1386–1403 Timurid invasions of Georgia
- 1407–1502 Turkoman invasions of Georgia
- 1463–1491 Collapse of the Georgian realm
  - 1463 Battle of Chikhori
  - 1483 Battle of Aradeti
- 16th–19th century Lekianoba
  - 1755 Battle of Kvareli
  - 1778–1779 Battle of Ghartiskari
  - 1800 Battle of Niakhura
- 1508 Georgian campaign (1508)
- 1514–1823 Ottoman–Persian Wars
  - 1578–1590 Ottoman–Safavid War (1578–1590)
  - 1603–1612 Ottoman–Safavid war (1603–1612)
- 1520 Battle of Chikhori
- 1535 Battle of Murjakheti
- 1541–1566 Tahmasp I's Kakhetian and Kartlian campaigns
- 1547 Ottoman invasion of Guria
- 1556 Battle of Garisi
- 1568–1918 Russo-Turkish wars
  - 1768–1774 Russo-Turkish war (1768–1774)
  - 1806–1812 Russo-Turkish War (1806–1812)
  - 1828–1829 Russo-Turkish War (1828–1829)
  - 1877–1878 Russo-Turkish War (1877–1878)
- 1596–1597 Daryal war
- 1598–1599 Battle of Gori (1598–1599)
- 1599 Battle of Nakhiduri
- 1609 Battle of Tashiskari
- 1623–1658 Western Georgian civil war (1623–1658)
- 1626 Battle of Bazaleti
- 1651–1828 Russo-Persian Wars
  - 1722–1723 Russo-Persian War (1722–1723)
  - 1796 Persian expedition of 1796
  - 1804–1813 Russo-Persian War (1804–1813)
  - 1826–1828 Russo-Persian War (1826–1828)
- 1659 Kakhetian Uprising (1659)
- 1703 Ottoman invasion of western Georgia (1703)
- 1757 Battle of Khresili
- 1779 Battle of Rukhi
- 1795 Battle of Krtsanisi
- 1800–1864 Russian conquest of the Caucasus
- 1804 1804 Mtiuleti rebellion
- 1841 Rebellion in Guria (1841)
- 1853–1856 Crimean War
- 1875–1876 Svaneti uprising of 1875–1876
- 1905–1907 Russian Revolution of 1905
- 1914–1918 World War I
  - 1914–1918 Middle Eastern theatre of World War I
    - 1914–1918 Caucasus campaign
- 1917–1922 Russian Civil War
  - 1917–1921 Southern Front of the Russian Civil War
    - 1918–1919 Sochi conflict
    - 1920 1920 Georgian coup attempt
- 1918 Armeno-Georgian War
      - 1921 Soviet invasion of Georgia
- 1924 August Uprising
- 1989–present Abkhazia conflict
  - 1992–1993 War in Abkhazia (1992–1993)
  - 1998 War in Abkhazia (1998)
  - 2001 2001 Kodori crisis
  - 2006 2006 Kodori crisis
  - 2007 Bokhundjara incident
- 1989–present Georgian–Ossetian conflict
  - 1991–1992 South Ossetian war (1991–1992)
- 1991–1993 Georgian Civil War
  - 1991–1992 1991–1992 Georgian coup d'état
- 1998 1998 Georgian attempted mutiny
- 2000–2002 Pankisi Gorge crisis
- 2004 2004 Adjara crisis
- 2008 Russo-Georgian War
- 2009 2009 Georgian mutiny
- 2012 Lopota incident
- 2017 2017 Isani flat siege

=== Iraq ===
==== Early Dynastic Period (Mesopotamia) ====
- c. 2600 BC Sumer–Elam war
- c. 2600 BC Siege of Uruk
- c. 26th century BC – c. 24th century BC Umma–Lagash war
- c. 1235 BC Babylonian–Assyrian War of 1235 BCE

==== Neo-Assyrian Empire ====
- 878 BC Battle of Suru
- 814 BC Battle of Dur-Papsukkal
- 796 BC Assyrian conquest of Aram
- 693 BC Battle of Diyala River
- 691 BC Battle of Halule
- 689 BC Siege of Babylon
- 655–639 BC Assyrian conquest of Elam
- 647 BC Battle of Susa
- 626–620 BC Revolt of Babylon (626 BC)
- 616–605 BC Medo-Babylonian conquest of the Assyrian Empire
  - 614 BC Fall of Assur
  - 612 BC Battle of Nineveh (612 BC)

==== Neo-Babylonian Empire ====
- 814 Battle of Dur-Papsukkal
- 796 Assyrian conquest of Aram
- 693 BC Battle of Diyala River
- 691 BC Battle of Halule
- 689 BC Siege of Babylon
- 655–639 BC Assyrian conquest of Elam
- 647 BC Battle of Susa
- 626–620 BC Revolt of Babylon (626 BC)
- 616–605 BC Medo-Babylonian conquest of the Assyrian Empire

==== Achaemenid Province of Athura ====
- 484 BC Babylonian revolts (484 BC)
- 539 BC Battle of Opis
- 539 BC Fall of Babylon

==== Macedonian Empire ====
- 335–323 BC Wars of Alexander the Great

==== Seleucid Empire ====
- 322–275 BC Wars of the Diadochi
  - 311–309 BC Babylonian War

==== Parthian Empire ====
- 238–129 BC Seleucid–Parthian wars

==== Roman Province of Mesopotamia ====
- 54 BC – 628 AD Roman–Persian Wars
  - 54 BC – 217 AD Roman–Parthian Wars
    - 194–198 Roman–Parthian War of 194–198
    - 161–166 Roman–Parthian War of 161–166
    - 216–217 Parthian war of Caracalla

==== Sasanian Province of Asorestan ====
- 54 BC–628 AD Roman-Persian Wars
  - 217–502 Roman–Sasanian wars
    - 229–233 First Mesopotamian campaign of Ardashir I
    - 232 Sasanian campaign of Severus Alexander
    - 237–241 Second Mesopotamian campaign of Ardashir I
    - 242–244 Sasanian campaign of Gordian III
    - 253 Siege of Emesa (253)
    - 259–267 Odaenathus' Sasanian campaigns
    - 283 Carus' Sasanian campaign
    - 293–298 Galerius' Sasanian campaigns
    - 337–361 Perso-Roman wars of 337–361
    - 363 Julian's Persian expedition
    - 363–371 Perso-Roman wars of 337–361
  - 502–628 Byzantine–Sasanian wars
    - 421–422 Roman–Sasanian War of 421–422
    - 440 Byzantine–Sasanian War of 440
    - 502–506 Anastasian War
    - 526–532 Iberian War
    - 541 Belisarius' invasion of Mesopotamia (541)
    - 572–591 Byzantine–Sasanian War of 572–591
    - 602–628 Byzantine–Sasanian War of 602–628
- 395 Hunnic raid of 395
- 589–591 Sasanian civil war of 589–591
- 604–611 Battle of Dhi Qar
- 633–644 Muslim conquest of Persia
  - 634–638 Arab conquest of Mesopotamia

==== Rashidun Caliphate ====
- 633–644 Muslim conquest of Persia
  - 634–638 Arab conquest of Mesopotamia
- 656–661 First Fitna
  - 658–661 Mu'awiya I's Southern Campaigns (658–661)

==== Umayyad Caliphate ====
- 680–692 Second Fitna
- 703 Battle of Dayr al-Jamajim
- 743–750 Third Fitna
- 747–750 Abbasid revolution

==== Abbasid Caliphate ====
- 762–763 Alid revolt of 762–763
- 809–827 Fourth Fitna
- 861–870 Anarchy at Samarra
- 865–866 Abbasid civil war (865–866)
- 923 Sack of Basra (923)
- 946 Battle of Baghdad (946)
- 810–835 Zutt Rebellion
- 866–896 Kharijite Rebellion (866–896)
- 869–883 Zanj Rebellion
- 942 Battle of al-Mada'in
- 946 Battle of Baghdad (946)
- 1096 Siege of Mosul (1096)
- 1107 Battle of Mosul (1107)
- 1136 Siege of Baghdad (1136)
- 1157 Siege of Baghdad (1157)

==== Mongol Empire ====
- 1206–1368 Mongol invasions and conquests
  - 1219–1258 Mongol conquest of Persia and Mesopotamia

==== Mamluk Sultanate ====
- 1370–1508 Timurid conquests and invasions
  - 1394 Capture of Baghdad (1394)

==== Ottoman Iraq ====
- 1532–1555 Ottoman–Safavid War (1532–55)
- 1623–1639 Ottoman–Safavid War (1623–39)
- 1722–1747 Campaigns of Nader Shah
  - 1730–1735 Ottoman–Persian War (1730–1735)
    - 1732–1733 Nader Shah's Mesopotamian campaign
- 1801–1811 Wahhabi raids on Najaf
- 1802 Wahhabi sack of Karbala
- 1843 Siege of Karbala 1843
- 1914–1918 World War I
  - 1914–1918 Middle Eastern theatre of World War I
    - 1914–1918 Mesopotamian campaign

==== Occupied Enemy Territory Administration ====
- 1918–2003 Iraqi–Kurdish conflict
  - 1919–1930 Mahmud Barzanji revolts
- 1920 Iraqi revolt of 1920

==== Mandatory Iraq ====
- 1918–2003 Iraqi–Kurdish conflict
  - 1919–1930 Mahmud Barzanji revolts

==== Kingdom of Iraq ====
- 1901–1934 Unification of Saudi Arabia
  - 1927–1930 Ikhwan revolt
- 1918–2003 Iraqi-Kurdish conflict
  - 1931–1932 Ahmed Barzani revolt
  - 1943–1945 1943 Barzani revolt
- 1935–1936 1935–1936 Iraqi Shia revolts
- 1935 1935 Yazidi revolt
- 1939–1945 World War II
  - 1940–1945 Mediterranean and Middle East theatre of World War II
    - 1941 1941 Iraqi coup d'état
    - 1941 Anglo-Iraqi War
- 1948 Al-Wathbah uprising
- 1958 14 July Revolution

==== First Iraqi Republic ====
- 1959 1959 Mosul uprising
- 1918–2003 Iraqi–Kurdish conflict
  - 1961–1970 First Iraqi–Kurdish War
- 1963 Ramadan Revolution
- 1963 Ar-Rashid revolt
- 1963 November 1963 Iraqi coup d'état
- 1966 1966 Iraqi coup attempt
- 1968 17 July Revolution

==== Ba'athist Iraq ====
- 1918–2003 Iraqi–Kurdish conflict
  - 1961–1970 First Iraqi–Kurdish War
  - 1974–1975 Second Iraqi–Kurdish War
  - 1975–1983 PUK insurgency
  - 1979–1988 Al-Ansar insurgency
  - 1983–1986 Kurdish Rebellion of 1983
  - 1994–1997 Iraqi Kurdish Civil War
  - 2001–2003 Iraqi Kurdistan conflict (2001–2003)
- 1921 – present Kurdish–Turkish conflict
  - 1978–2025 Kurdistan Workers' Party insurgency
    - 1983–2025 PKK insurgency in Iraqi Kurdistan
- 1973 1973 Samita border skirmish
- 1974–1975 1974–75 Shatt al-Arab conflict
- 1977 1977 Shia uprising in Iraq
- 1979–1980 1979–1980 Shia uprising in Iraq
- 1979–2024 Assadist–Saddamist conflict
- 1980–1988 Iran–Iraq War
  - 1980 Iraqi invasion of Iran
  - 1985–1988 Tanker War
- 1981 Operation Opera
- 1990–1991 Gulf War
  - 1991 Gulf War air campaign
  - 1991 Liberation of Kuwait campaign
- 1991 1991 Iraqi uprisings
- 1991–2003 Iraqi no-fly zones conflict
- 1999 1999 Shia uprising in Iraq
- 2003 – present Iraqi conflict
  - 2003–2011 Iraq War
    - 2003 2003 invasion of Iraq

==== Coalition Provisional Authority ====
- 1921 – present Kurdish–Turkish conflict
  - 1978–2025 Kurdistan Workers' Party insurgency
    - 1983–2025 PKK insurgency in Iraqi Kurdistan
- 2003 – present Iraqi conflict
  - 2003–2011 Iraq War
    - 2003–2006 2003–2006 phase of the Iraqi insurgency

==== Republic of Iraq ====
- 1921 – present Kurdish–Turkish conflict
  - 1978–2025 Kurdistan Workers' Party insurgency
    - 1983–2025 PKK insurgency in Iraqi Kurdistan
- 2003 – present Iraqi conflict
  - 2003–2011 Iraq War
    - 2003–2011 Iraqi insurgency (2003–2011)
      - 2003–2006 2003–2006 phase of the Iraqi insurgency
    - 2006–2008 Iraqi civil war (2006–2008)
      - 2006–2007 Islamic Army–Al-Qaeda conflict
  - 2006 – present Sadrist–Khomeinist conflict
  - 2011–2013 Iraqi insurgency (2011–2013)
  - 2013–2017 War in Iraq (2013–2017)
    - 2014–2021 US-led intervention in Iraq (2014–2021)
    - 2014 – present Iranian intervention in Iraq (2014–present)
    - 2017 2017 Iraqi–Kurdish conflict
  - 2017 – present Islamic State insurgency in Iraq (2017–present)
  - 2019 2019 Sinjar clashes
  - 2019 2019 Israeli airstrikes in Iraq
  - 2022 2022 Erbil missile attacks
  - 2023 2023 unrest in Kirkuk
  - 2023 2023 Makhmour clashes
- 2023 – present Middle Eastern crisis (2023–present)
  - 2023–2024 Attacks on US bases during the Gaza war
  - 2025 2025 Iraq drone attacks

=== Israel ===
==== Canaan ====
- c. 2000 BCE Battle of Siddim
- c. 1457 BC Battle of Megiddo (15th century BC)
- Fall of Jericho
- Battle of the Waters of Merom
- Mid 12th century BCE Battle of Mount Tabor
- c. 1200 BCE Battle of Gibeah
- Battle of Aphek
- c. 1084 BC Battle of Mizpah
- c. 1020 BC Battle of the Wood of Ephraim

==== United Kingdom of Israel and Judah ====
- c. 1010 BC Siege of Jebus

==== Kingdom of Judah ====
- 931 BC – 913 BC Jeroboam's Revolt
- 911 BC – 870 BC Battle of Zephath
- 874 BC Israelite–Aramean War
- 736 BC – 732 BC Syro-Ephraimite War
- 701 BC Sennacherib's campaign in Judah
- 635 BC Fall of Ashdod
- 626 BC – 609 BC Medo-Babylonian conquest of the Assyrian Empire
  - 609 BC Battle of Megiddo (609 BC)
- 601 BC – 587 BC Judah's revolts against Babylon

==== Babylonian Province of Yehud ====
- 601 – 587 BCE Judah's revolts against Babylon

==== Persian Province of Yehud Medinata ====
- 335 – 323 BCE Wars of Alexander the Great

==== Seleucid Empire ====
- 322 BC – 275 BC Wars of the Diadochi
- 274 BC – 168 BC Syrian Wars
- 167 BC – 160 BC Maccabean Revolt

==== Hasmonean Kingdom ====
- 73 BC – 63 BC Third Mithridatic War
- 67 BC – 63 BC Hasmonean civil war
- 54 BC – 217 Roman–Parthian Wars
  - 40 BC – 38 BC Pompeian–Parthian invasion of 40 BC
  - 37 BC Siege of Jerusalem (37 BC)
  - 36 BC Antony's Atropatene campaign

==== Roman Province of Judea ====
- 46 – 48 Jacob and Simon uprising
- 66 – 136 Jewish–Roman wars
  - 66 – 73 First Jewish–Roman War
  - 115 – 117 Diaspora Revolt
    - 116 – 118 Kitos War

==== Roman Province of Syria Palaestina ====
- 66 – 136 Jewish–Roman wars
  - 132 – 136 Bar Kokhba revolt

==== Byzantine Province of Palaestina Prima ====
- 602 – 628 Byzantine–Sasanian War of 602–628
  - 614 – 628 Jewish revolt against Heraclius
- 622 – 750 Early Muslim conquests
  - 629 – 1050s Arab–Byzantine wars
    - 634 – 638 Muslim conquest of the Levant

==== Abbasid Province of Jund Filastin ====
- 793 – 796 Qays–Yaman war (793–796)
- 1099–1291 Crusades
  - 1099 First Crusade

==== Kingdom of Jerusalem ====
- 1095–1303 Crusades
  - 1107–1110 Norwegian Crusade
  - 1122–1124 Venetian Crusade
  - 1145–1149 Second Crusade
  - 1152–1155 Rögnvald Kali's Crusade
  - 1189–1192 Third Crusade
  - 1197 Crusade of 1197
  - 1217–1221 Fifth Crusade
  - 1228–1229 Sixth Crusade
  - 1239–1241 Barons' Crusade
  - 1268–1302 Fall of Outremer
  - 1271–1272 Lord Edward's crusade
- 1206–1368 Mongol invasions and conquests
  - 1260–1323 Mongol invasions of the Levant
    - 1260–1300 Mongol raids into Palestine
- 1256–1381 Venetian–Genoese Wars
  - 1256–1270 War of Saint Sabas
- 1291–1399 Crusades after the fall of Acre, 1291–1399

==== Ottoman Eyalet of Damascus ====
- 1516–1517 Ottoman–Mamluk War (1516–17)
- 1703–1705 Naqib al-Ashraf revolt
- 1834–1835 Syrian peasant revolt (1834–1835)
  - 1834 Peasants' revolt in Palestine

==== Ottoman Vilayet of Syria ====
- 1914–1918 World War I
  - 1914–1918 Middle Eastern theatre of World War I
    - 1915–1918 Sinai and Palestine campaign

==== Occupied Enemy Territory Administration ====
- 1920–1948 Intercommunal conflict in Mandatory Palestine
  - 1920 Battle of Tel Hai
- 1920 Franco-Syrian War

==== Mandatory Palestine ====
- 1918–present Israeli–Palestinian conflict
  - 1920–1948 Intercommunal conflict in Mandatory Palestine
    - 1936–1939 1936–1939 Arab revolt in Palestine
    - 1944–1947 Jewish insurgency in Mandatory Palestine
      - 1944–1945 The Saison
    - 1947–1949 1948 Palestine war
      - 1947–1948 1947–1948 civil war in Mandatory Palestine
- 1939–1945 World War II
  - 1940–1945 Mediterranean and Middle East theatre of World War II
    - 1940–1941 Italian bombing of Mandatory Palestine in World War II

==== State of Israel ====
- 1918–present Israeli–Palestinian conflict
  - 1947–1949 1948 Palestine war
    - 1948–1949 1948 Arab–Israeli War
  - 1948–present Gaza–Israel conflict
    - 1987–1993 First Intifada
    - 2000–2005 Second Intifada
    - 2006 2006 Gaza cross-border raid
    - 2006 2006 Gaza–Israel conflict
    - 2008 Operation Hot Winter
    - 2008–2009 Gaza War (2008–09)
    - 2010 March 2010 Israel–Gaza clashes
    - 2010 2010 Gaza flotilla raid
    - 2012 March 2012 Gaza–Israel clashes
    - 2012 2012 Gaza War
    - 2014 2014 Gaza War
    - 2018 November 2018 Gaza–Israel clashes
    - 2019 May 2019 Gaza–Israel clashes
    - 2019 November 2019 Gaza–Israel clashes
    - 2022 2022 Gaza–Israel clashes
    - 2023 May 2023 Gaza–Israel clashes
    - 2023–present Gaza war
      - 2023 October 7 attacks
      - 2023–present Israeli invasion of the Gaza Strip
  - 1949–1956 Palestinian Fedayeen insurgency
  - 1951–1966 Reprisal operations
  - 2015–2016 2015–2016 wave of violence in the Israeli–Palestinian conflict
  - 2021 2021 Israel–Palestine crisis
- 1948–present Arab–Israeli conflict
  - 1948–present Israeli–Lebanese conflict
    - 1982–present Hezbollah–Israel conflict
      - 1985–2000 South Lebanon conflict (1985–2000)
      - 2000–2006 2000–2006 Shebaa Farms conflict
      - 2006 2006 Lebanon War
      - 2015 January 2015 Shebaa Farms incident
      - 2023–present Israel–Hezbollah conflict (2023–present)
  - 1956 Suez Crisis
  - 1967 Six-Day War
  - 1967–1970 War of Attrition
  - 1973 Yom Kippur War
  - 2023–present Middle Eastern crisis (2023–present)
    - 2023–present Red Sea crisis
    - 2024 2024 Iran–Israel conflict
    - 2025 Iran–Israel war
- 2011–present Syrian civil war
  - 2011–present Spillover of the Syrian civil war
    - 2012–present Israeli–Syrian ceasefire line incidents during the Syrian civil war
- 2023 2023 Eritrean clashes in Tel Aviv

=== Jordan ===
- 1095–1303 Crusades
- 1206–1368 Mongol invasions and conquests
  - 1260–1323 Mongol invasions of the Levant
- 1834–1835 Syrian peasant revolt (1834–1835)
- 1905 Shoubak revolts
- 1910 Karak revolt
- 1914–1918 World War I
  - 1914–1918 Middle Eastern theatre of World War I
    - 1915–1918 Sinai and Palestine campaign
    - 1916–1918 Arab Revolt
- 1921–1923 Kura rebellion
- 1923 Adwan Rebellion
- 1901–1934 Unification of Saudi Arabia
  - 1922–1924 Ikhwan raids on Transjordan
- 1957 1957 alleged Jordanian military coup attempt
- 1948–present Arab–Israeli conflict
  - 1950s – 1960s Reprisal operations
  - 1964–1967 War over Water (Jordan River)
  - 1967 Six-Day War
  - 1967–1970 War of Attrition
  - 2023–present Middle Eastern crisis (2023–present)
    - 2023–2024 Attacks on US bases during the Gaza war
    - 2024 2024 Iran–Israel conflict
- 1970–1971 Black September
- 2011–present Syrian civil war
  - 2011–present Spillover of the Syrian civil war
    - 2012–2018 Jordanian–Syrian border incidents during the Syrian civil war

=== Kuwait ===
- 622–750 Early Muslim conquests
  - 633–651 Muslim conquest of Persia
- 1900–1901 Kuwaiti–Rashidi war
- 1901–1934 Unification of Saudi Arabia
  - 1919–1920 Kuwait–Najd War
- 1961 Operation Vantage
- 1990–1991 Gulf War
  - 1990 Iraqi invasion of Kuwait
  - 1991 Gulf War air campaign
  - 1991 Liberation of Kuwait campaign

=== Lebanon ===
- 629–1050s Arab–Byzantine wars
  - 752–760 Mount Lebanon revolts of 752 and 759
- 694 Battle of Amioun
- 1095–1303 Crusades
  - 1107–1110 Norwegian Crusade
  - 1271–1272 Lord Edward's crusade
- 1292–1305 Kisrawan campaigns (1292–1305)
- 1367 Battle of Tripoli (1367)
- 1383 Battle of Beirut (1383)
- 1403 Boucicaut's expedition to the Levant (1403)
- 1520 Battle of Beirut (1520)
- 1623 Battle of Anjar
- 1658–1667 Druze power struggle (1658–1667)
- 1771 Battle of Lake Huleh (1771)
- 1834–1835 Syrian peasant revolt (1834–1835)
  - 1834–1835 Alawite revolt (1834–1835)
- 1838 1838 Druze revolt
- 1860 1860 civil conflict in Mount Lebanon and Damascus
- 1925–1927 Great Syrian Revolt
- 1939–1945 World War II
  - 1940–1945 Mediterranean and Middle East theatre of World War II
    - 1941 Syria–Lebanon campaign
- 1945 Levant Crisis
- 1948–present Arab–Israeli conflict
  - 1948–1949 1948 Arab–Israeli War
  - 1948–present Israeli–Lebanese conflict
    - 1968–1982 Palestinian insurgency in South Lebanon
    - 2010 2010 Israel–Lebanon border clash
    - 2013 Hanikra border clash
  - 1982–present Hezbollah–Israel conflict
    - 1985–2000 South Lebanon conflict (1985–2000)
      - 1996 Operation Grapes of Wrath
    - 2000–2006 2000–2006 Shebaa Farms conflict
    - 2006 2006 Lebanon War
    - 2015 January 2015 Shebaa Farms incident
    - 2023–present Middle Eastern crisis (2023–present)
      - 2023–present Israel–Hezbollah conflict (2023–present)
        - 2024–present 2024 Israeli invasion of Lebanon
        - 2026–present 2026 Lebanon war
      - 2024 2024 Iran–Israel conflict
- 1958 Lebanon Crisis
- 1961 1961 Lebanese coup attempt
- 1975–1991 Lebanese Civil War
  - 1982 1982 Lebanon War
- 1976–2015 Bab al-Tabbaneh–Jabal Mohsen conflict
- 1999–2000 Dinnieh clashes
- 2007 2007 Lebanon conflict
- 2008 2008 Lebanon War
- 2011–present Syrian civil war
  - 2011–2017 Syrian civil war spillover in Lebanon
- 2021 2021 Beirut clashes
- 2023 2023 Ain al-Hilweh clashes
- 2025 2025 Beirut riots

=== Oman ===
- 656–661 First Fitna
- 1819 Persian Gulf campaign of 1819
- 1820–1821 Bani Bu Ali expedition
- 1913–1920 Muscat rebellion
- 1952–1955 Buraimi dispute
- 1954–1959 Jebel Akhdar War
- 1965–1976 Dhofar Rebellion
- 1970 1970 Omani coup d'état

=== Palestine ===
- 336–323 BC Wars of Alexander the Great
- 793–796 Qays–Yaman war (793–796)
- 1095–1303 Crusades
  - 1096–1099 First Crusade
  - 1107–1110 Norwegian Crusade
  - 1122–1124 Venetian Crusade
  - 1145–1149 Second Crusade
  - 1152–1155 Rögnvald Kali's Crusade
  - 1189–1192 Third Crusade
  - 1197 Crusade of 1197
  - 1217–1221 Fifth Crusade
  - 1228–1229 Sixth Crusade
  - 1239–1241 Barons' Crusade
  - 1268–1302 Fall of Outremer
  - 1271–1272 Lord Edward's crusade
- 1834–1835 Syrian peasant revolt (1834–1835)
  - 1834 Peasants' revolt in Palestine
- late 19th century – present Israeli–Palestinian conflict
  - 1920–1948 Intercommunal conflict in Mandatory Palestine
    - 1936–1939 1936–1939 Arab revolt in Palestine
    - 1944–1947 Jewish insurgency in Mandatory Palestine
      - 1944–1945 The Saison
    - 1947–1949 1948 Palestine war
      - 1947–1948 1947–1948 civil war in Mandatory Palestine
      - 1948–1949 1948 Arab–Israeli War
  - 1948–present Gaza–Israel conflict
    - 1987–1993 First Intifada
    - 2000–2005 Second Intifada
    - 2001–present Salafi jihadist insurgency in the Gaza Strip
    - 2009 Battle of Rafah (2009)
    - 2006–present Fatah-Hamas conflict
      - 2007 Battle of Gaza (2007)
      - 2009 2009 Hamas political violence in Gaza
    - 2006 2006 Gaza cross-border raid
    - 2006 2006 Gaza–Israel conflict
    - 2006 2006 Israeli operation in Beit Hanoun
    - 2008 Operation Hot Winter
    - 2008–2009 Gaza War (2008–09)
    - 2010 2010 Israel–Lebanon border clash
    - 2010 March 2010 Israel–Gaza clashes
    - 2010 2010 Gaza flotilla raid
    - 2012 March 2012 Gaza–Israel clashes
    - 2012 2012 Gaza War
    - 2014 2014 Gaza War
    - 2015–2016 wave of violence in the Israeli–Palestinian conflict
    - 2018–2019 2018–2019 Gaza border protests
    - 2018 November 2018 Gaza–Israel clashes
    - 2019 May 2019 Gaza–Israel clashes
    - 2019 November 2019 Gaza–Israel clashes
    - 2022 2022 Gaza–Israel clashes
    - 2023 May 2023 Gaza–Israel clashes
    - 2023–present Gaza war
      - 2023–present Israeli invasion of the Gaza Strip
      - 2023–present Israeli incursions in the West Bank during the Gaza war
      - 2024–present Hamas–Popular Forces conflict
  - 1949–1956 Palestinian Fedayeen insurgency
  - 1951–1966 Reprisal operations
  - 2006 Operation Bringing Home the Goods
  - 2015–2016 2015–2016 wave of violence in the Israeli–Palestinian conflict
  - 2021 2021 Israel–Palestine crisis
  - 2022–present Palestinian Authority–West Bank militias conflict
- 1914–1918 World War I
  - 1914–1918 Middle Eastern theatre of World War I
    - 1915–1918 Sinai and Palestine campaign
- 1948–present Arab–Israeli conflict
  - 1956 Suez Crisis
  - 1967 Six-Day War
  - 2023–present Middle Eastern crisis (2023–present)
    - 2024 2024 Iran–Israel conflict
    - 2025 Iran–Israel war

=== Qatar ===
- 1811 Battle of Khakeekera
- 1867–1868 Qatari–Bahraini War
- 1881–1893 Qatari–Abu Dhabi War
- 1893 Battle of Al Wajbah
- 1937 1937 Qatari–Bahraini conflict
- 1972 1972 Qatari coup d'état
- 1995 1995 Qatari coup d'état
- 1996 1996 Qatari coup attempt
- 2023–present Middle Eastern crisis (2023–present)
  - 2025 Iran–Israel war
  - 2025 2025 Israeli attack on Doha

=== Saudi Arabia ===
==== Muslim conquests ====
- 623–632 List of expeditions of Muhammad
- 632–633 Ridda wars

==== Rashidun Caliphate ====
- 656–661 First Fitna

==== Umayyad Caliphate ====
- 680–692 Second Fitna
- 743–750 Third Fitna

==== Abbasid Caliphate ====
- 762–763 Alid Revolt (762–763)
- 786 Battle of Fakhkh

==== First Saudi state ====
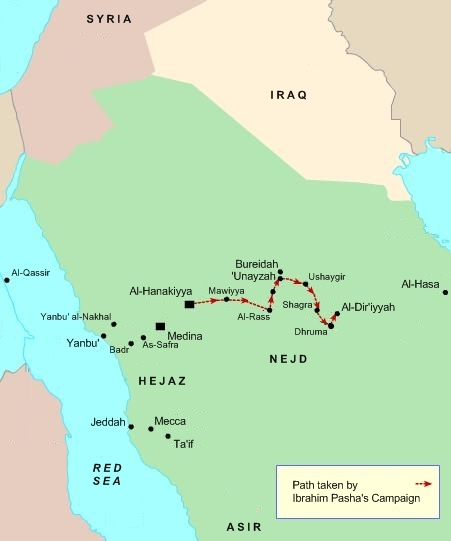
Ibrahim Pasha's Campaign against the Saudis in Nejd

- 1811–1818 Ottoman–Wahhabi War

==== Second Saudi state ====
- 1836 Expedition to Najd (1836)
- 1866 Attack on Dammam
- 1891 Battle of Mulayda

==== Kingdom of Saudi Arabia ====
- 1901–1934 Unification of Saudi Arabia
  - 1903–1907 Saudi–Rashidi War (1903–1907)
  - 1915–1918 Second Saudi-Rashidi War
  - 1918–1919 First Saudi–Hashemite War
  - 1919–1920 Kuwait–Najd War
  - 1921 Conquest of Ha'il
  - 1924–1925 Saudi conquest of Hejaz
  - 1927–1930 Ikhwan Revolt
  - 1934 Saudi–Yemeni War (1934)
- 1939–1945 World War II
  - 1940–1945 Mediterranean and Middle East theatre of World War II
    - 1940 Bombing of Bahrain in World War II
- 1969 Al-Wadiah War
- 1979 Grand Mosque seizure
- 1979–2023 Qatif conflict
- 1991 Gulf War
  - 1991 Gulf War air campaign
- 2004–2014 Houthi insurgency
  - 2009–2010 Operation Scorched Earth
- 2005 Ar Rass raids
- 2014–present Yemeni Civil War (2014–present)
  - 2015–present Saudi-led intervention in the Yemeni civil war
    - 2015–present Houthi–Saudi Arabian conflict
- 2023–present Middle Eastern crisis (2023–present)
  - 2023–present Red Sea crisis

=== Syria ===
==== Neo-Assyrian Empire ====
- c. 1235 BC Babylonian–Assyrian War of 1235 BCE
- c. 1206 BC – c. 1150 BC Late Bronze Age collapse
  - c. 1190 BC Destruction of Ugarit
- 856–732 BC Assyrian conquest of Aram
- 736–732 BC Syro-Ephraimite War
- 605 BC Battle of Carchemish
- 605 BC Battle of Hamath

==== Seleucid Empire ====
- 322–281 BC Wars of the Diadochi
- 274–168 BC Syrian Wars

==== Roman Syria ====
- 49–45 BC Caesar's civil war
- 235–284 Crisis of the Third Century
- 629–1050s Arab–Byzantine wars
  - 634–638 Muslim conquest of the Levant

==== Abbasid Caliphate ====
- 629–1050s Arab–Byzantine wars
  - 962 Sack of Aleppo (962)
- 854–855 Homs revolts (854–855)
- 903 Battle of Hama (903)

==== County of Tripoli ====
- 1201–1219 War of the Antiochene Succession

==== Ayyubid Sultanate ====
- 1124–1125 Siege of Aleppo (1124)
- 1129 Crusade of 1129
- 1138 Siege of Aleppo (1138)
- 1147–1150 Second Crusade
- 1178 Battle of Hama (1178)
- 1229 Siege of Damascus (1229)

==== Mamluk Sultanate ====
- 1260–1323 Mongol invasions of the Levant
- 1280 Battle of al-Jassora
- 1302 Fall of Ruad
- 1386 Zahiri Revolt
- 1400 Sack of Aleppo (1400)

==== Ottoman Syria ====
- 1516 Massacre of the Telal
- 1658–1667 Druze power struggle (1658–1667)
- 1711 Battle of Ain Dara
- 1818 Catholic–Orthodox clash in Aleppo (1818)
- 1831–1833 Egyptian–Ottoman War (1831–1833)
- 1834–1835 Syrian peasant revolt (1834–1835)
  - 1834–1835 Alawite revolt (1834–1835)
- 1838 1838 Druze revolt
- 1850 Massacre of Aleppo (1850)
- 1860 1860 civil conflict in Mount Lebanon and Damascus
- 1909–1910 Hauran Druze Rebellion

==== French Mandate of Syria ====
- 1919–1921 Alawite revolt of 1919
- 1920 Franco-Syrian War
- 1920–1921 Hananu Revolt
- 1925–1927 Great Syrian Revolt
- 1939–1945 World War II
  - 1940–1945 Mediterranean and Middle East theatre of World War II
    - 1941 Syria–Lebanon campaign
- 1945 Levant Crisis

==== Syrian Arab Republic ====
- 1921–present Kurdish–Turkish conflict
  - 1978–2025 Kurdistan Workers' Party insurgency
- 1947 1947 anti-Jewish riots in Aleppo
- 1948–1979 Arab–Israeli conflict
  - 1967 Six-Day War
  - 1973 Yom Kippur War
- 1949 March 1949 Syrian coup d'état
- 1949 August 1949 Syrian coup d'état
- 1949 December 1949 Syrian coup d'état
- 1951 1951 Syrian coup d'état
- 1954 1954 Syrian coup d'état
- 1957 Syrian Crisis of 1957
- 1961 1961 Syrian coup d'état
- 1962 1962 Syrian coup d'état attempt
- 1963 1963 Syrian coup d'état
- 1963 July 1963 Syrian coup attempt
- 1964 1964 Hama riot
- 1966 1966 Syrian coup d'état
- 1970 Corrective Movement (Syria)
- 1976–1982 Islamist uprising in Syria
- 1984 1984 Syrian coup attempt
- 1979–2024 Assadist-Saddamist conflict
- 2004 2004 Qamishli riots
- 2007 Operation Outside the Box
- 2011–present Syrian civil war
  - 2011–2024 Syrian revolution
  - 2011–2012 Early insurgency phase of the Syrian civil war
  - 2011 – present Turkish involvement in the Syrian civil war
  - 2012–2013 2012–2013 escalation of the Syrian civil war
  - 2011 – present Turkish involvement in the Syrian Civil War
    - 2016–2017 Operation Euphrates Shield
    - 2017–2024 Turkish military operation in Idlib Governorate
    - 2018 Operation Olive Branch
    - 2019 2019 Turkish offensive into northeastern Syria
    - 2024–2025 Turkish–Syrian National Army offensive in Northern Syria (2024–2025)
  - 2012–2016 Battle of Aleppo (2012–2016)
  - 2012–present Rojava conflict
    - 2013–2026 Rojava–Islamist conflict
  - 2014–present War against the Islamic State
  - 2014–present US intervention in the Syrian civil war
  - 2015 Northwestern Syria offensive (April–June 2015)
  - 2015 Palmyra offensive (May 2015)
  - 2015–2024 Russian intervention in the Syrian civil war
  - 2018–2019 Idlib demilitarization (2018–2019)
  - 2019 Northwestern Syria offensive (April–August 2019)
  - 2019–2020 Northwestern Syria offensive (2019–2020)
  - 2024 2024 Syrian opposition offensives
  - 2024 Israeli invasion of Syria (2024–present)
  - 2024–present Western Syria clashes
  - 2025–present Druze insurgency in Southern Syria (2025–present)
  - 2025–present SDF–Syrian transitional government clashes (2025–present)
- 2023–present Middle Eastern crisis (2023–present)
    - 2024 2024 Iran–Israel conflict
    - 2025 Iran–Israel war

=== Turkey ===
==== Hittite Empire ====
- c. 1400 – c. 1350 BC Hittite Wars of Survival
- c. 1312 BC Battle of Ganuvara
- c. 13 century BC Battle of Nihriya
- c. 1260 BC – c. 1240 BC Trojan War

==== Lydian Empire ====
- 585 BC Battle of Halys

==== Achaemenid Empire ====
- 547 BC Battle of Pteria
- 547 BC Battle of Thymbra
- 547 BC Siege of Sardis (547 BC)
- 499–449 BC Greco-Persian Wars
  - 499–493 BC Ionian Revolt
  - 492–490 BC First Persian invasion of Greece
  - 480–478 BC Second Persian invasion of Greece
  - 477–449 BC Wars of the Delian League
- 431–404 BC Peloponnesian War

==== Macedonian Empire ====
- 335–323 BC Wars of Alexander the Great

==== Seleucid Empire ====
- 322–275 BC Wars of the Diadochi
- 238–129 BC Seleucid–Parthian wars
- 201–200 BC War of the Armenian Succession (201–200 BC)

==== Roman Republic ====
- 192–188 BC Roman–Syrian War
- 54 BC – 628 AD Roman–Persian wars

==== Kingdom of Pontus ====
- 88–63 BC Mithridatic Wars
  - 88–84 BC First Mithridatic War
  - 83–81 BC Second Mithridatic War
  - 75–63 BC Third Mithridatic War

==== Roman Empire ====
- 54 BC – 217 AD Roman–Parthian Wars
  - 58–63 Roman–Parthian War of 58–63
- 49–45 BC Caesar's civil war
- 235–284 Crisis of the Third Century
- 306–353 Civil wars of the Tetrarchy
  - 313 Battle of Tzirallum
  - 324 Battle of Adrianople (324)
  - 324 Battle of the Hellespont
  - 324 Siege of Byzantium (324)
  - 324 Battle of Chrysopolis

==== Kingdom of Armenia ====
- 50–55 Iberian–Armenian War
- 54 BC – 217 AD Roman–Parthian Wars
  - 58–63 Roman–Parthian War of 58–63
- 54 BC – 628 AD Roman–Persian Wars
  - 337–361 Perso-Roman wars of 337–361
    - 350 Shapur II's invasion of Armenia (350)
- 335–336 Sanesan invasion of Armenia (335–336)
- 363–371 Armeno-Sasanian War of 363–371

==== Byzantine Empire ====
- 421–628 Byzantine–Sasanian wars
  - 421–422 Roman–Sasanian War (421–422)
  - 502–506 Anastasian War
  - 526–532 Iberian War
  - 572–591 Roman–Persian War of 572–591
  - 602–628 Byzantine–Sasanian War of 602–628
- 532 Nika riots
- 559 Battle by the Anastasian Wall (559)
- 559 Battle of Melantias
- 629–1050s Arab–Byzantine wars
  - 717–718 Siege of Constantinople (717–718)
- 639–661 Muslim conquest of Armenia
- 680–1355 Byzantine–Bulgarian wars
  - 894–896 Byzantine–Bulgarian war of 894–896
  - 913–927 Byzantine–Bulgarian war of 913–927
  - 968–971 Sviatoslav's invasion of Bulgaria
- 702–703 Battle of Vardanakert
- 775–819 Paphlagonian expedition of the Rus'
- 775 Battle of Bagrevand
- 860 Siege of Constantinople (860)
- 907 Rus'–Byzantine War (907)
- 941 – 944 Rus'–Byzantine War (941–944)
- 1042 Battle of Ani
- 1043 Rus'–Byzantine War (1043)
- 1057 Battle of Petroe
- 1081–1185 Komnenian restoration
  - 1091 Battle of Levounion
- 1182 Massacre of the Latins
- 1220s–1240s Mongol invasion of Europe
  - 1242 Mongol invasion of the Latin Empire
  - 1263 Mongol invasion of Byzantine Thrace
- 1256–1381 Venetian–Genoese Wars
  - 1350–1355 War of the Straits
- 1321–1328 Byzantine civil war of 1321–28

==== Seljuk Empire ====
- 1012–1199 Georgian–Shaddadid wars
- 1064–1213 Georgian–Seljuk wars
- 1048–1308 Byzantine–Seljuk wars
- 1064–1213 Georgian–Seljuk wars
- 1090–1194 Nizari–Seljuk conflicts
- 1206–1368 Mongol invasions and conquests
  - 1220–1236 Mongol invasions of Georgia

==== Sultanate of Rum ====
- 1095–1291 The Crusades
  - 1095–1099 First Crusade
    - 1096 People's Crusade
  - 1101 Crusade of 1101
  - 1145–1149 Second Crusade
  - 1189–1192 Third Crusade
  - 1202–1204 Fourth Crusade
- 1048–1308 Byzantine–Seljuq wars
- 1240–1241 Babai revolt

==== Cilician Armenia ====
- 1111 Siege of Zovk
- 1152 Battle of Mamistra
- 1201–1219 War of the Antiochene Succession
- 1266 Battle of Mari
- 1276 Second Battle of Sarvandik'ar
- 1292 Siege of Rumkale
- 1315 Siege of Malatya (1315)
- 1375 Fall of Sis

==== Latin Empire ====
- 1204–1261 Bulgarian–Latin wars
  - 1205 Battle of Adrianople (1205)
  - 1206 Battle of Rodosto
  - 1206 Battle of Rusion
  - 1235 Siege of Constantinople (1235)
- 1204–1261 Struggle for Constantinople (1204–1261)

==== Ottoman Empire ====
- 1265–1479 Byzantine–Ottoman Wars
  - 1459 Fall of Constantinople
- 1291–1399 Crusades after the fall of Acre, 1291–1399
  - 1343–1351 Smyrniote crusades
- 1312–1918 Serbian–Ottoman wars
- 1345–1396 Bulgarian–Ottoman wars
- 1366–1526 Hungarian–Ottoman Wars
- 1396–1718 Ottoman–Venetian wars
  - 1416 Battle of Gallipoli (1416)
  - 1463–1479 Ottoman–Venetian War (1463–1479)
- 1446 Buçuktepe rebellion
- 1511 Şahkulu rebellion
- 1519–1648 Celali rebellions
- 1526 Baba Zünnun Rebellion
- 1527 Kalender Çelebi rebellion
- 1543 Battle of Karagak
- 1543 Battle of Sokhoista
- 1589 Beylerbeyi event
- 1624–1628 Abaza rebellion
- 1648 Atmeydanı incident
- 1656 Çınar incident
- 1703 Edirne Incident
- 1806 1806 Edirne incident
- 1807–1808 Ottoman coups of 1807–1808
- 1821 Constantinople massacre of 1821
- 1826 Auspicious Incident
- 1843–1846 1843 and 1846 massacres in Hakkari
- 1853–1856 Crimean War
- 1876 1876 Ottoman coup d'état
- 1878 Çırağan incident
- 1894 1894 Sasun rebellion
- 1894–1897 Hamidian massacres
  - 1895–1896 Zeitun rebellion (1895–96)
  - 1896 Defense of Van (1896)
  - 1897 Khanasor Expedition
- 1896 Occupation of the Ottoman Bank
- 1897 Greco-Turkish War (1897)
- 1904 1904 Sasun uprising
- 1907 Bitlis uprising (1907)
- 1908 Young Turk Revolution
- 1909 31 March Incident
- 1912 1912 Ottoman coup d'état
- 1912–1913 Balkan Wars
  - 1913 Second Balkan War
- 1913 1913 Ottoman coup d'état
- 1914 Bitlis uprising (1914)
- 1914–1918 World War I
  - 1914–1918 Middle Eastern theatre of World War I
    - 1914–1918 Caucasus campaign
    - 1915–1916 Gallipoli campaign
- 1917–1922 Russian Civil War
  - 1917–1921 Southern Front of the Russian Civil War
    - 1918–1920 Armenian–Azerbaijani war (1918–1920)
- 1919–1923 Turkish War of Independence
  - 1918–1923 Anglo-Turkish War
  - 1918–1922 Franco-Turkish War
  - 1919–1922 Greco-Turkish War (1919–1922)
  - 1920 Turkish invasion of Armenia
  - 1920–1921 Revolts during the Turkish War of Independence
- 1921–present Kurdish–Turkish conflict
  - 1921 Koçgiri rebellion

==== Republic of Turkey ====
- 1921–present Kurdish–Turkish conflict
  - 1924 Beytüşşebab rebellion
  - 1925 Sheikh Said rebellion
  - 1927–1930 Ararat rebellion
  - 1978–2025 Kurdistan Workers' Party insurgency
    - 2015–2025 Kurdish–Turkish conflict (2015–present)
  - 1983–present Kurdish Hezbollah insurgency
- 1936–1953 Turkish Straits crisis
- 1960 1960 Turkish coup d'état
- 1962 1962 Turkish coup attempt
- 1963 1963 Turkish coup attempt
- 1968–1980 Political violence in Turkey (1976–1980)
  - 1980 1980 Turkish coup d'état
- 1971 1971 Turkish military memorandum
- 1972–present Maoist insurgency in Turkey
  - 1990–present DHKP/C insurgency in Turkey
- 1986 Evros River incident
- 1993 1993 alleged Turkish military coup
- 1996 Imia crisis
- 1997 1997 Turkish military memorandum
- 2013–present AKP–Gülen movement conflict
  - 2016 2016 Turkish coup d'état attempt
  - 2016–present Purges in Turkey (2016–present)
- 2013–present Turkey–Islamic State conflict

=== United Arab Emirates ===
- 632 – 633 Ridda Wars
- 1809 Persian Gulf campaign of 1809
- 1819 Persian Gulf campaign of 1819
- 1881–1893 Qatari–Abu Dhabi War
- 1922 1922 Dhabyani coup d'état
- 1926 1926 Dhabyani coup d'état
- 1928 1928 Dhabyani coup d'état
- 1952–1955 Buraimi dispute
- 1954–1955 1954-1955 Dhabyani coup attempt
- 1965 1965 Sharjawi coup d'état
- 1966 1966 Dhabyani coup d'état
- 1971 Seizure of Abu Musa and the Greater and Lesser Tunbs
- 1972 1972 Sharjawi coup d'état attempt
- 1987 1987 Sharjawi coup attempt
- 2011 2011 Dhabyani coup attempt
- 2014–present Yemeni civil war (2014–present)

=== Yemen ===
- 518–525 Aksumite invasion of Himyar
- 570–578 Aksumite–Persian wars
  - 570 Battle of Hadhramaut
  - 570 Siege of Sanaa (570)
  - 575–578 Sasanian reconquest of Yemen
- 632–633 Ridda wars
- 744–750 Third Fitna
  - 747–748 Ibadi revolt
- 1523 Battle of Ash-Shihr (1523)
- 1548 Battle of al-Shihr (1548)
- 1909–1910 Zaraniq rebellion (1909–1910)
- 1914–1918 World War I
  - 1914–1918 Middle Eastern theatre of World War I
    - 1914–1919 Campaign in South Arabia
- 1925–1929 Zaraniq rebellion (1925–1929)
- 1931 1931 Saudi–Yemeni border skirmish
- 1931–1932 Najran conflict
- 1934 Saudi–Yemeni war (1934)
- 1948 al-Waziri coup
- 1955 1955 Yemeni coup attempt
- 1956–1960 Yemeni–Adenese clan violence
- 1962–1970 North Yemen Civil War
- 1963–1967 Aden Emergency
- 1967 1967 North Yemen coup d'état
- 1969 Al-Wadiah War
- 1972 First Yemenite War
- 1974 June 13 Corrective Movement
- 1978–1982 NDF Rebellion
- 1979 Second Yemenite War
- 1986 South Yemeni crisis
- 1994 Yemeni civil war (1994)
- 1995 Hanish Islands conflict
- 1998–present Al-Qaeda insurgency in Yemen
- 2002–present US airstrikes on Yemen
- 2004–2014 Houthi insurgency
  - 2009–2010 Operation Scorched Earth
- 2009–present South Yemen insurgency
- 2011–2012 Yemeni revolution
  - 2011 Battle of Sanaa (2011)
  - 2011 Battle of Taiz
- 2014–present Yemeni civil war (2014–present)
  - 2015–ongoing Saudi-led intervention in the Yemeni civil war
    - 2015–present Houthi–Saudi Arabian conflict
- 2023–present Red Sea crisis
  - 2024 2024 Iran–Israel conflict

== See also ==
- List of conflicts in North America
- List of conflicts in Central America
- List of conflicts in South America
- List of conflicts in Europe
- List of conflicts in Africa
- List of conflicts in the Near East
- List of conflicts in the Middle East
- List of conflicts in Australia
- List of wars
