= Daud Shah (disambiguation) =

Daud Shah is a village in Khyber Province, Pakistan.

Daud Shah may also refer to:

- Daud Shah (actor)
- Daud Shah (Paktika), a delegate to Afghanistan's Constitutional Loya Jirga
- Daud Shah of Gujarat (born Daud Khan), 15th-century ruler of the Gujarat Sultanate in India; r. 1458–1458
- Daud Shah Bahmani, 14th-century ruler of the Bahmani Sultanate in India.
