= Bahmani–Vijayanagar War (1443) =

Last war between the Bahmanis and Vijayanagar

- Part of Bahmani–Vijayanagar Wars
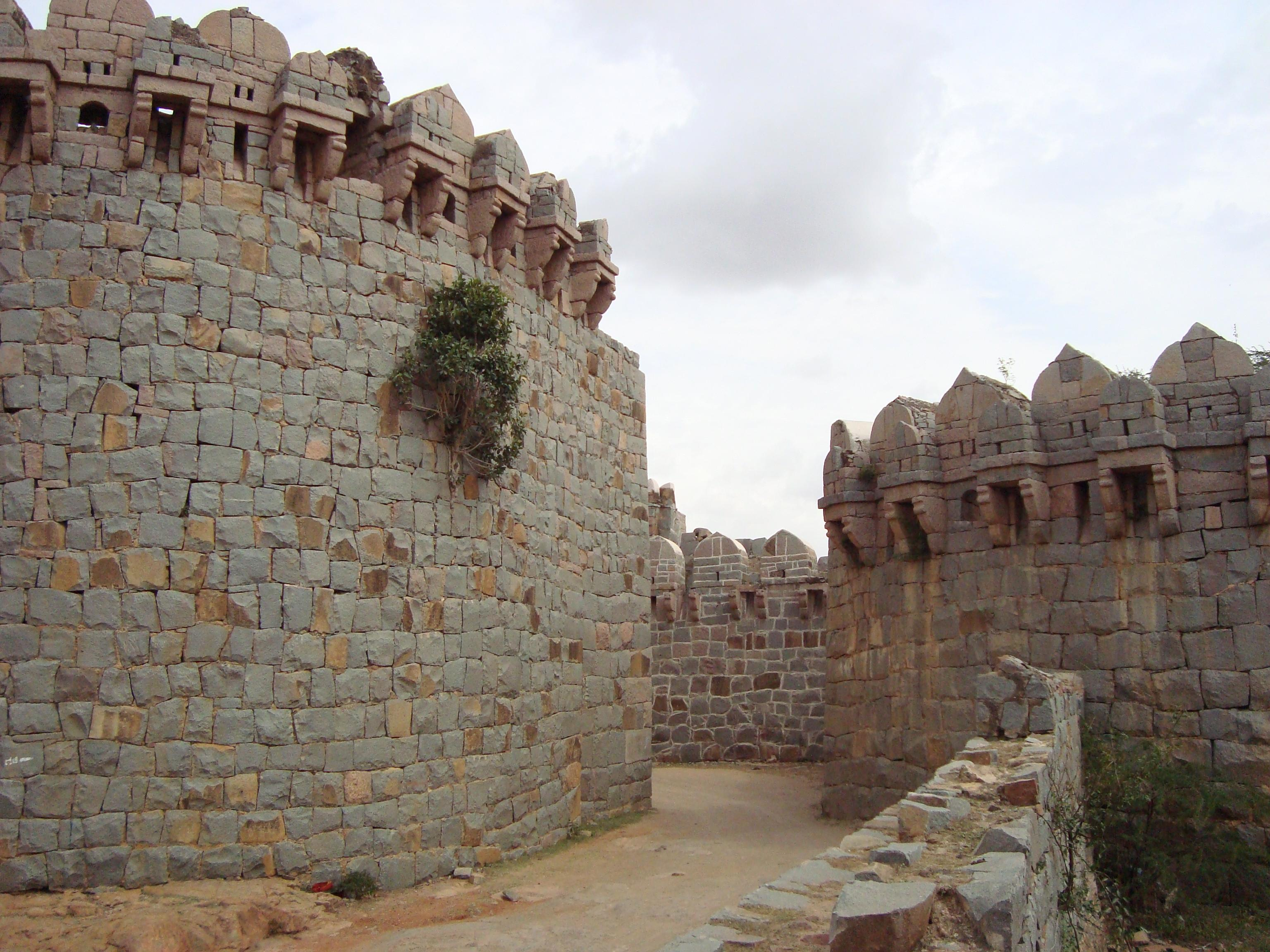
- Mudgal fort, where Deva Raya II was besieged
Date	1443
Location	Mudgal, Karnataka 16.02°N 76.43°E
Result	Bahmani victory. See the Aftermath section
Territorial changes	Bahmani forces relieved the sieges of Raichur and Bankapur

Belligerents
Bahmani Sultanate	Vijayanagara Empire

Commanders and leaders
Alau'd-din Ahmad Shah; Malik Tujjar	Deva Raya II; Son of Deva Raya II †

Strength
60,000 infantry 50,000 cavalry	10,000 mounted archers 60,000 horsemen 300,000 infantry
- Location within Karnataka Bahmani–Vijayanagar War (1443) (India)

The Bahmani–Vijayanagar War of 1443 marked the seventh war between the Bahmani Sultanate and the Vijayanagara empire in peninsular India. It commenced between the Bahmanis under Alauddin Ahmad Shah and the Vijayanagar under Deva Raya II, taking place in present-day Mudgal, Karnataka. During the two-month campaign, three engagements took place near Mudgal; Vijayanagara prevailed in the first, while the Bahmanis prevailed in the second and third. These defeats compelled the Vijayanagara ruler to seek peace, agreeing to pay tribute to the Bahmanis.

Following the Siege of Vijayanagara by Bahmani ruler Ahmad Shah I Wali in 1423, there were no military conflicts between the Bahmanis and the Vijayanagara empire until the ascension of his son, Alauddin Ahmad Shah. Upon assuming power, Alauddin dispatched his brother, Muhammad Khan, to demand tribute from the Vijayanagara ruler, Deva Raya II, which had been withheld. Muhammad Khan successfully defeated the Vijayanagara forces, compelling Deva Raya to pay tribute. This event prompted Deva Raya to incorporate Muslim forces into his army to enhance its training. Returning from the campaign, Muhammad Khan received counsel from certain officers suggesting that he possessed equal rights to the Bahmani Sultanate as his brother Alauddin, as promised by their father, Ahmad Shah. Seeking support from various chiefs, including the Vijayanagara emperor, Muhammad Khan captured several locations, prompting Alauddin to mobilize against him. Despite his defeat, Muhammad Khan was pardoned by Alauddin and granted the jagir of Rajachal.

After surviving an assassination attempt orchestrated by his brother in Vijayanagara, Deva Raya II retaliated by executing those implicated in the conspiracy. Seizing this moment of vulnerability, Bahmani Sultan Alauddin saw an opportunity to invade Vijayanagara and exact tribute, which Deva Raya II had promised but failed to pay. In response, Vijayanagara troops launched attacks on Bahmani territories, plundering their positions. Alauddin mobilized his forces against Deva Raya, deploying his general Malik Tujjar against Deva Raya's sons. The Bahmanis successfully relieved the sieges of Raichur and Bankapur, compelling Vijayanagara troops to retreat from the occupied regions. The decisive battles took place at Mudgal, where Bahmani forces initially faced setbacks but ultimately emerged victorious. Deva Raya agreed to pay tribute under the condition that Alauddin would not cross the frontier again. This conflict marked the final war between the Bahmanis and Vijayanagara.

== Background ==
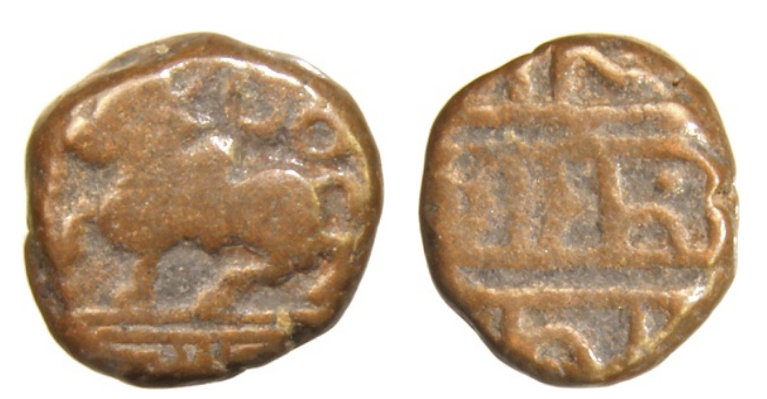
Bronze coins of Deva Raya II

Following the severe blow dealt by the Bahmanis during the Siege of Vijayanagara in 1423, Vira Vijaya died, and was succeeded by his brother Deva Raya II. The ascension of Devaraya II heralded the peak of prosperity for Vijayanagara under the first dynasty. The repeated defeats suffered at the hands of the Bahmanis prompted Deva Raya II to overhaul his military strategy. He received counsel suggesting that the success of the Bahmanis stemmed from the superiority of their cavalry and their expertise in archery. Consequently, he enlisted Muslims into his service, granted them jagirs (land grants), and even constructed a mosque at Vijayanagar for their worship.

After his victory against Vijayanagara in 1423, Ahmad Shah I Wali proceeded to subjugate the Velama chiefs of Telangana, who had aided Vijayanagara in their war against the Bahmanis. He defeated and killed Anapota II, capturing the entire Telangana region in the process. Following this campaign, Ahmad Shah I focused more on the northern part of his realm. Throughout the remainder of his reign, he engaged in wars with the rulers of Mahur, Malwa, Konkan, and Gujarat, ensuring Vijayanagara's immunity from northern attacks for about a decade.

However, the heirs of the late Velama king managed to reclaim various districts of Telangana. But their success was short-lived, as Ahmad Shah I returned to Telangana around 1433 and reduced them to vassalage. Similar to Ahmad Shah I, Deva Raya also sought to avenge the support of kingdoms that had allied with his enemies in the past. Deva Raya could not overlook the alliance between Pedakomati Vema of Kondavidu and Firuz Shah Bahmani. Capitalising on the weakness of Vema's incompetent successors, Deva Raya conquered the kingdom and incorporated it into his empire. An epigraph at Kondavidu, dated 1432, documents his grant to a Brahman from the region. Ahmad Shah died in 1436, and he was succeeded by his son Alauddin II on 14 July 1436, who assumed the title of Ahmad upon his succession. He renewed war with Vijayanagara upon his succession due to the Vijayanagara king's failure to pay tribute.

=== Deva Raya II's attitude towards Muslim soldiers ===
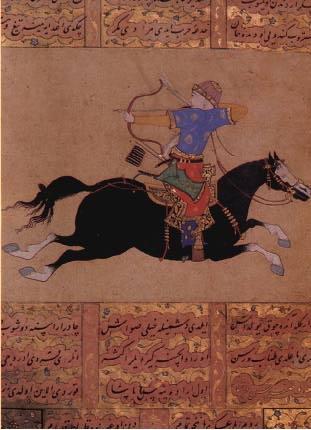
Example of a Turkish mounted Archer

In the years leading up to 1440, Vijayanagara launched offensive attacks against the Bahmani kingdom but suffered defeat. Upon investigating the causes of this defeat, it was concluded that the superiority of the Muslim forces lay in their Turkish mounted archers. In response, Devaraya took immediate steps to address this weakness by recruiting a special force of 2000 Muslim archers. He housed them in a designated quarter of the city where they had a mosque and a separate slaughterhouse. Devaraya showed them respect by placing a copy of the Quran in front of his throne, so that obeisance made before the monarch was offered to the Quran. He widely recruited Muslims and utilized them both within the ranks and as trainers for his Hindu troops.

This force was not the first Muslim contingent to serve in the Vijayanagara armies. Historical records suggest that during the battle at Trichinopoly, the last Hoysala ruler commanded a contingent of 20,000 Muslims. Additionally, inscriptions indicate that Devaraya I, a predecessor of Devaraya II, also employed a force of Muslim cavalry. Devaraya II utilized these Muslim troops to train other archers in cavalry tactics. As a result, within the next few years, he had amassed a body of 60,000 archers ready to take the field. Altogether, Deva Raya's army comprised 10,000 mounted foreign archers, 60,000 Hindu horsemen proficient in archery, and 300,000 adequately trained infantry soldiers.

=== Record of Nicolo Conti about Bahmanis ===
The fifteenth-century Italian traveler Nicolo Conti provides a description of Indian life during the rule of Alauddin Ahmad Shah, the Bahmani ruler at the time. He observed Indian ships, noting their distinctiveness, especially those anchored in the ports of the Deccan. Conti remarked that these ships were notably larger than those constructed in the shipyards of Italy, each equipped with five sails and as many masts. The lower part of these vessels was constructed with triple planks to withstand the force of the storms prevalent in monsoon climates. Conti mentioned that some of these ships were designed in a way that if one part were damaged by the tempest, the remaining portion could safely complete the voyage to port.

Regarding the arts of war, Conti mentions that the army utilized javelins, swords, arm-pieces, round shields, bows, and arrows. In particular, he notes that the inhabitants of Central India also employed ballistae, bombarding machines, and siege pieces. Conti found it peculiar that pestilence was unknown among the people, and they were not susceptible to the diseases that afflicted populations in his own country.

=== Record of Abd al-Razzaq about Vijayanagara ===
Shortly after the war, Abd-ur-Razzaq, the ambassador of Shah Rukh from Samarqand, who had spent some time in Calicut, visited Vijayanagara and stayed in the capital for a few months. According to his account, by 1442, the fortifications, temples, palaces, and public buildings of Vijayanagara had been completed. The city occupied an area of approximately sixty-four square miles, with seven enclosures, the accepted number of circuits for a first-class city. The three outermost enclosures consisted of fields designated for cultivation, along with the huts of those working on the land. The four inner enclosures were occupied by houses, with the innermost enclosure containing the palace and its precincts. Several channels had been directed into the city from the Tungabhadra River; one of them is still known as the Raya channel. These channels served the dual purpose of cultivation and supplying water to the city. Despite the potential for exaggeration in Abd-ur-Razzaq's account, Rapson noted that Vijayanagara under Devaraya II must have been a splendid city, boasting exceptional fortifications.

== Prelude ==
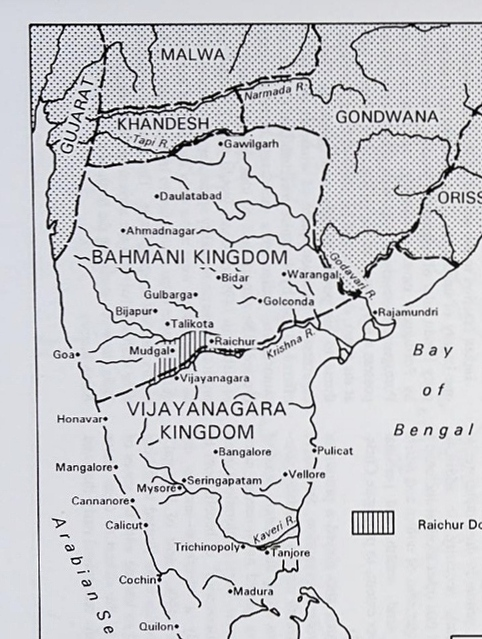
Map of the Deccan Plateau, India, 1962

In 1436, shortly after Alauddin II's accession, he launched a war against Vijayanagara because the King of Vijayanagara had withheld payment of tribute to the Bahmanis, that had been in arrears for five years. Consequently, Alauddin sent his brother Muhammad Khan and his Amirul Umara Imadul Mulk to demand tribute by force. Additionally, another reason for the conflict was that Deva Raya II, the king of Vijayanagara, had wrongfully seized Anegundi, a Bahmani fort.

As the Bahmani army advanced, they ravaged the Vijayanagara countryside and caused significant devastation. With no other option left, Deva Raya was compelled to sue for peace. Consequently, the Sultan offered peace terms, which included the exchange of twenty elephants, a substantial sum of money, and two hundred females skilled in music and dancing. Additionally, valuable presents were given to Prince Muhammad Khan as part of the peace agreement.

=== Rebellion of Muhammad Khan ===
While returning home from Vijayanagara, Muhammad Khan halted for a few days at Mudgal. During his stay, he was approached by individuals who were hostile to the interests of his own dynasty. Discontented officers from his own army informed him that it was his late father's wish for him to rule the country jointly with his brother. They claimed that his brother had marginalized him to a subordinate role. They suggested that it was only appropriate for him to demand a partition of the kingdom and receive his rightful share. Muhammad Khan was swayed by these proposals and, influenced by them, he executed Imadul-Mulk and sought assistance from Deva Raya of Vijayanagara. Deva Raya, likely the instigator of the conspiracy himself, readily provided Muhammad Khan with the assistance he sought. In doing so, he attempted to achieve through deceit what he had failed to achieve on the battlefield. The prince promptly seized several forts, including Mudgal, Raichur, Sholapur, and Naldrug, and even crowned himself at a location along the banks of the Krishna River. Alauddin had to personally move to the south to confront his brother. Despite Muhammad's defeat, he was pardoned and granted the jagir of Rajachal.

Deva Raya of Vijayanagara was reeling from the defeat inflicted upon him by Prince Muhammad and had also been unsuccessful in his attempts to manipulate the prince against his brother. Around 1442, according to Sherwani, Deva Raya started to contemplate that perhaps his weakness on the battlefield had contributed to these setbacks, prompting him to embark on reforms for his fighting forces. The nature and implementation of these reforms are an intriguing episode. These were the events that prompted him to recruit Muslim soldiers in his army.

"About this time Dew Ray (Deva Raya) of Beejanuggar (Vijayanagar) summoned a council of his nobility and principle brahmins; observing to them that as his country (the Carnatic), in extent, population and revenue, far exceeded that of the house of Bahmuny (Bahmani), and also as his army was more numerous, he requested them to point out the cause of the successes of the Mahomedans (Muslims) and of his being reduced to pay them tribute. Some said that the Almighty had decreed to them a superiority over the Hindoos (Hindus) for thirty thousand years, a circumstance which was foretold to them in their own writings. Others said that the superiority of the Muslims arose out of two circumstances: first, that their horses were stronger; ... secondly, that a great body of excellent archers were always maintained by the kings of the house of Bahmuny Dew Ray, upon this, gave orders to enlist Mussulmans (Muslims) in his service, allotting them estates, and erecting a mosque for their use in the city of Beejanuggur. He also commended that no one should molest them in the exercise of their religion, and moreover, he ordered a Quran to be placed before his throne on a rich desk, so that the faithful might perform the ceremony of obeisance in his presence without sinning against their laws. He also made all the Hindoo soldiers learn the art of archery. He could soon muster two thousand Mahomedans and sixty thousand Hindoos well skilled in archery, besides eighty thousand cavalry and two hundred thousand infantry, armed in the usual manner with pikes and lances."

— John Briggs, translation of Firishta., History of the Rise of the Mahomedan Power in India,

=== Assassination attempt on Deva Raya ===
Sometime after the aforementioned events, a significant incident occurred in Vijayanagara. A brother of the king, driven by jealousy and perhaps harbouring ambitions for the kingship, devised a plot to assassinate him. Under the guise of hosting guests for the inauguration of his new house, he invited key state officials who were loyal to the king. As each guest arrived, they were discreetly dispatched by specially appointed assassins. Subsequently, the brother hurried to the palace and confronted the king, unleashing multiple violent blows upon him with a dagger. Believing Deva Raya to be dead, the assailant then proceeded to the palace portico and declared himself as the new king before the gathered crowd. The king, though severely wounded, was not dead and soon arrived at the scene. Upon presenting himself to his people, they apprehended the assassin and executed him. Following this, Deva Raya exacted vengeance on all those who had supported the murderer in this treacherous conspiracy. He ordered their capture and subjected them, along with their families, to gruesome tortures before putting them to death.

Viewing the situation as an opportunity, Alauddin decided to invade Vijayanagara as the promised seven lakhs of Tankas were not paid by Deva Raya. Deva Raya's refusal to pay the tribute led to the renewal of war between the two parties.

== The war ==
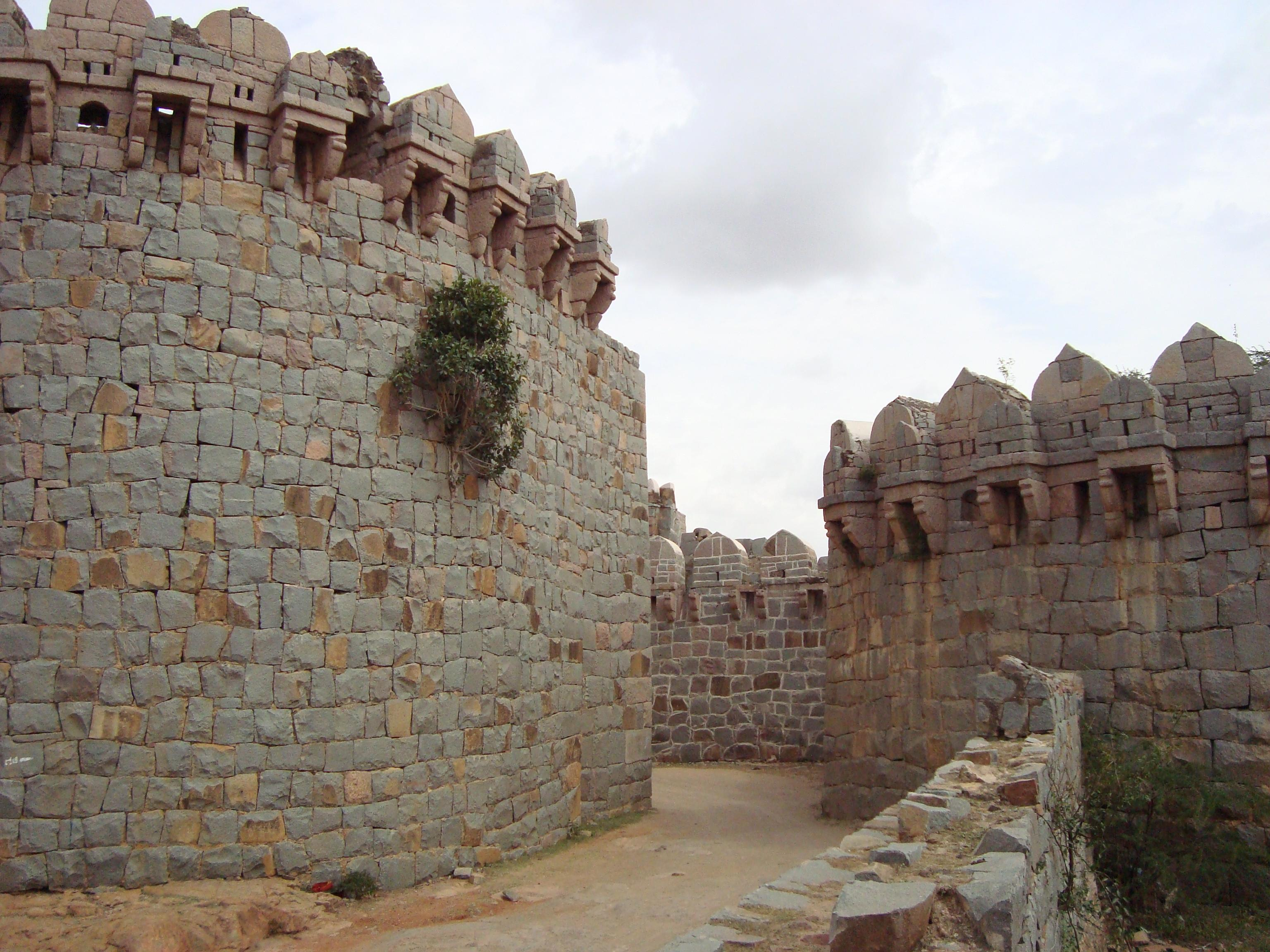
The Mudgal fort, a fort of Bahmani Sultanate and the site where the fiercest battle took place for Bahmani-Vijayanagar War of 1443

Deva Raya resolved to personally take the field and aimed to reclaim the Raichur Doab, which had been lost in the previous war. He dispatched his two sons, with one heading to Raichur and the other to Bankapur, while he himself crossed the Tungabhadra River and seized Mudgal. Subsequently, he established his camp near the banks of the Krishna River and dispatched troops to raid Bahmani territories. The Vijayanagara troops conducted successful plundering raids, employing fire and sword to devastate everything in their path as far as Sagar and Bijapur.

The Bahmani Sultan grew increasingly concerned and personally led his forces southward. Alauddin dispatched Khalaf Hasan Maliku't-Tujjar with the army of Daulatabad against the son of Deva Raya. The Bahmani forces consisted of 50,000 horsemen, and 60,000 Infantry. Additionally, he sent Khan-i Zaman Sarlashkar of Bijapur and Khan-i Zaman Sarlashkar of Berar against Deva Raya himself. Khalaf Khan successfully lifted the siege of Raichur against the son of Deva Raya II, during which the latter sustained injuries. Subsequently, the wounded Vijayanagara prince retreated from the battlefield.

With the Bahmani forces advancing, Deva Raya II withdrew to Mudgal, where his troops were stationed. Simultaneously, the second son of Deva Raya faced defeat at Bankapur and was forced to retreat as well. The two primary forces, led by Deva Raya II and Alauddin, clashed at Mudgal, engaging in a fierce battle. Initially, the Vijayanagara forces gained the upper hand, delivering a severe blow to the Bahmani forces. However, with two consecutive victories in the following two months, the Bahmani forces ultimately emerged victorious. The eldest son of Deva Raya, who had been wounded, was killed in the battle. Deva Raya managed to capture two officers of Alauddin, namely Fakhrul Mulk Dehlavi and his brother, before retreating to the safety of the Mudgal fort. Upon learning of this, Alauddin sent a message to Deva Raya warning that if the two high-ranking officers were harmed, he would not hesitate to exact retribution by killing two lakh of his men when the time came. Deva Raya was not in a mood to continue the conflict furthermore. In response, Deva Raya said that he would pay tribute and stop fighting if the Sultan promises not to cross the frontier in the future.

== Aftermath ==
After Deva Raya responded by stating that he was ready to pay all the outstanding tribute and stop the war on a condition that the Sultan promised not to cross the frontier in future, Alauddin agreed with these terms, and a treaty was promptly signed. Fakhru’l-Mulk, along with his brother, was returned to the Sultan's camp, and all overdue tribute payments were duly settled.

According to Firishta, the two parties fought battles on three separate occasions within the span of two months. During the first encounter, Devaraya gained a massive victory, causing heavy casualties to the Bahmani army. However, the tide turned in the second battle, and after the third, the conflict ended with a peace treaty between them.

This marked the final conflict between Vijayanagara and the Bahmani kings, concluding the historical record of their interactions and relations with their southern neighbor. Abd-ur-Razzaq visited Vijayanagara shortly after the war, where he praised the city's architecture and fortifications in detail. Deva Raya lived for six more years following these events, during which the only source of concern was the northern frontier, particularly due to the activities of the monarch of Orissa, the Gajapatis. Therefore, upon Devaraya II's demise, the kingdom remained in a peaceful state and smoothly passed on to his eldest surviving son, Mallikarjuna, without any disputes. Devaraya II had lost one or two of his adult sons during the wars against the Bahmanis throughout his reign. Additionally, it is believed that during the massacre that culminated in the attempt on his life, one of his grown-up sons was also killed. Consequently, it is likely that Mallikarjuna ascended to the throne at a relatively young age.

== Sources ==
- Allan, John (1964). The Cambridge Shorter History of India. S. Chand. Archived from the original on 25 January 2017.
- Banerjee, Anil Chandra (1944). History of India. A. Mukherjee & Bros. p. 294. Archived from the original on 19 January 2017.
- Jaques, Tony (2006). Dictionary of Battles and Sieges: A Guide to 8,500 Battles from Antiquity Through the Twenty-first Century [3 Volumes]. Bloomsbury Academic. ISBN 978-0-313-33536-5.
- Nagaraju, Hettagonahalli Masthigowda (1991). Devaraya II and His Times: History of Vijayanagara. Prasaranga, University of Mysore.
- Nizami, Khaliq Ahmad (1970). A Comprehensive History of India: The Delhi Sultanat (A.D. 1206-1526), ed. by Mohammad Habib and Khaliq Ahmad Nizami. People's Publishing House. Archived from the original on 25 September 2018.
- Rapson, Edward James (1928). The Cambridge History of India: Turks and Afghans. Macmillan. Archived from the original on 16 March 2024.
- Sarma, P. Sree Rama (1992). A History of Vijayanagar Empire. Prabhakar Publications. Archived from the original on 25 January 2017.
- Sherwani, Haroon Khan (1985). The Bahmanis of the Deccan. Munshiram Manoharlal. Archived from the original on 17 January 2017.
