= Rachakonda Fort =

Coordinates: 17°10′56″N 78°48′9″E

- Interactive map of the Rachakonda Fort area

General information
- Location: India
- Completed: 1360 AD

Rachakonda Fort is a historic fort located in Rachakonda, Yadadri Bhongir

district of Telangana, India. It was built by the Recherla Nayaka king Anapotanayaka in the 14th century AD. Till that time the Recherla Nayakas had their capital at Anumagallu (present Amangal). At around 1360 AD, the capital was shifted by Anapotanayaka from Anumagallu to Rachakonda where he built a strong fort.

Anapotanayaka split the Kingdom into two for administrative convenience and his brother Madanayaka ruled from Devarakonda. Devarakonda was subservient to Rachakonda. The Recherla Nayakas lost control of Rachakonda in 1430 AD to the Bahamanis but held onto Devarakonda till 1475 AD when the Recherla kingdom was finally extinguished and they joined the court of Hampi Vijayanagara kingdom.

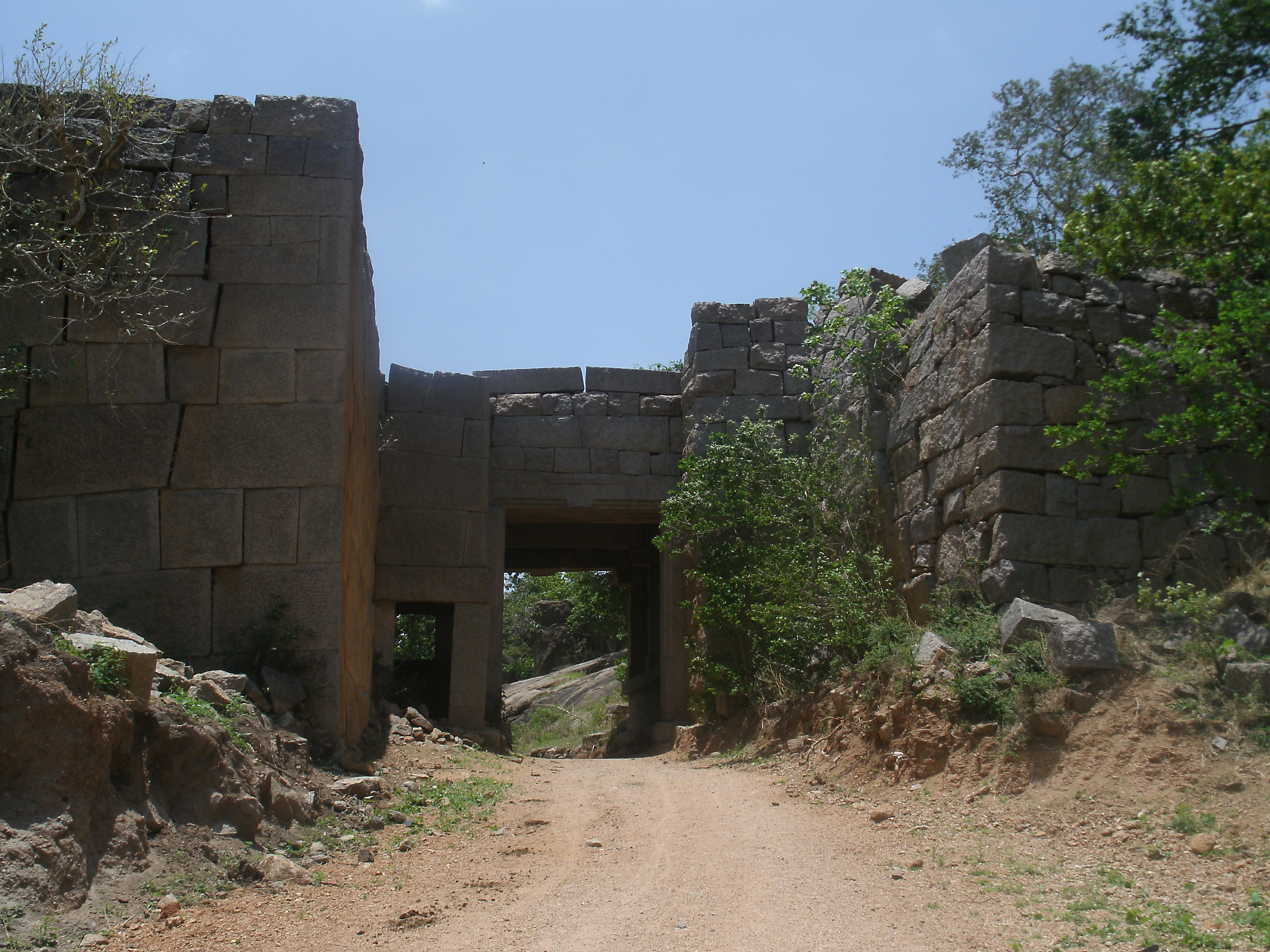
Main entrance in the South

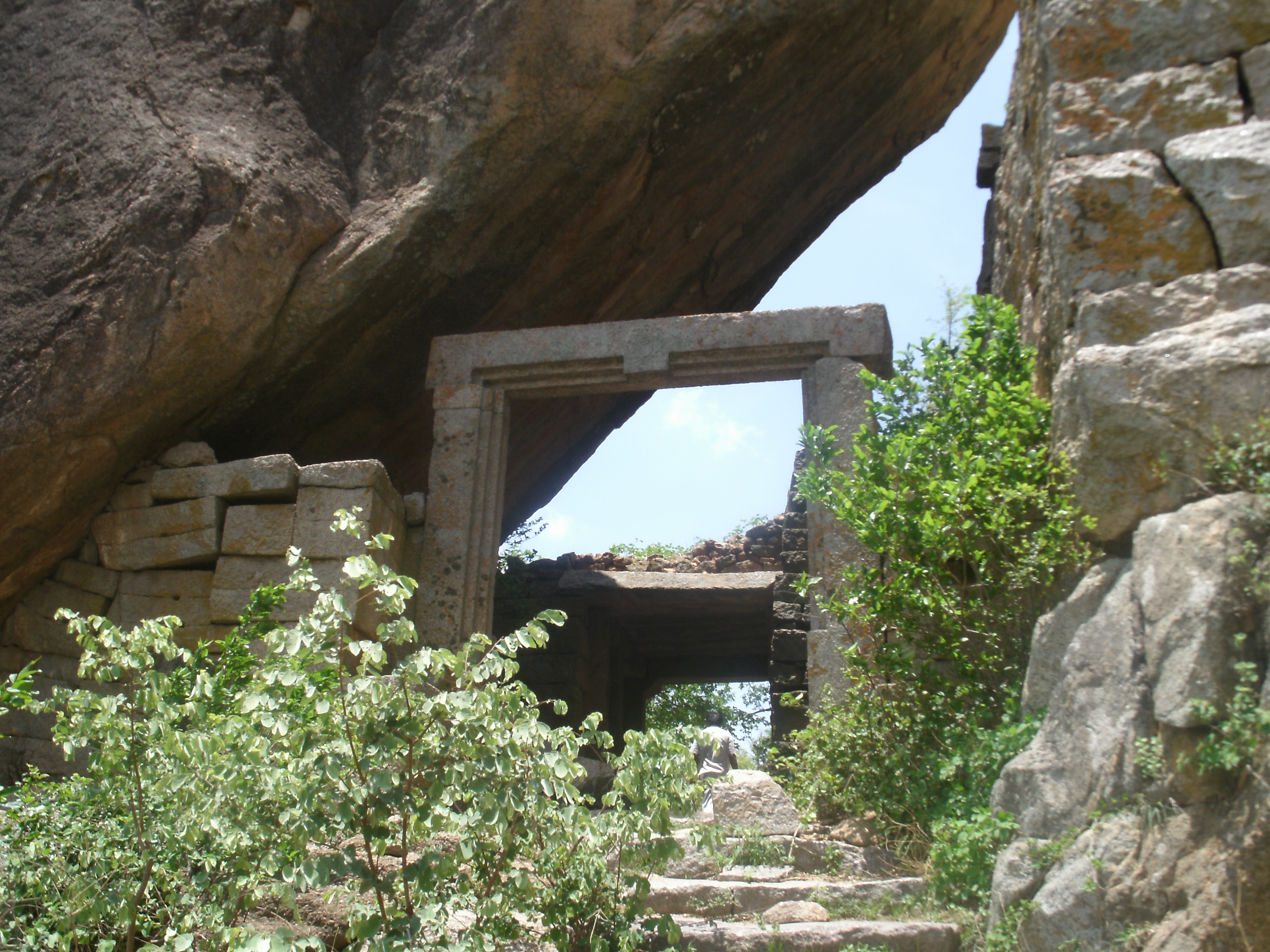
One of the gateways up the fort hill

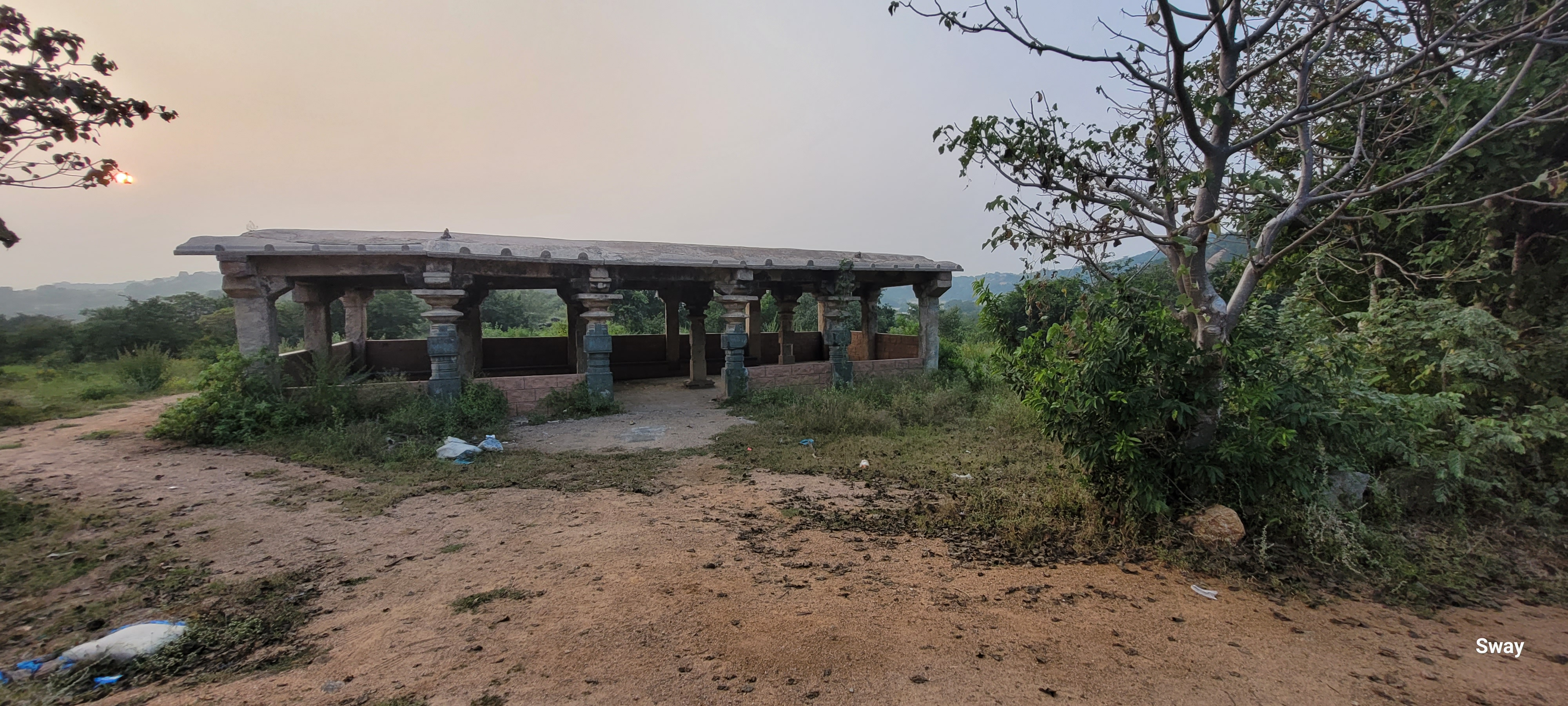
One of monument on hill

== Location ==
It is located in Samsthan Narayanpur Mandal, Yadadri Bhuvanagiri District, only 70 km away from Hyderabad. One has to take the highway up to Choutuppal and take a diversion from there and proceed another 25 km to reach Rachakonda. Another alternative is to take Nagarjuna Sagar Highway and take a diversion from Ibrahimpatnam. It is a shorter route and 45 km away from L.B.Nagar

== History ==
The fort of Rachakonda was constructed by Recherla Anapotanayaka, son of Recherla Singamanayaka, who was a commander of the Kakatiya King Prataparudra. The fort was constructed around 1360 AD.

Singamanayaka attacked the Jallipalli fort in around 1358 AD while he was extending his kingdom. While besieging the fort he was killed by the Somakula Kshatriyas by treachery and they were abetted in their act by the Reddys and the Telugu Nayakas. When Anapotanayaka and Madanayaka, the sons of Singamanayaka learned of this, they marshalled their forces and attacked Jallipalli fort in 1361 AD and defeated the Somakula Kshatriyas in battle. They did not stop their act of revenge and went after the Reddy Kings and the Telugu Nayakas. They came into conflict with the Kondaveeti Reddy kings when they occupied the Srisailam area which was then under the Reddy Kings. Madanayaka then defeated Anapota Reddy near Dharanikota but despite being victorious Dharanikota did not fall into the Padmanayakas hands. After this incident the rivalry between the Reddies and Rachakonda rulers did not abate till the time both were consumed by the Bahamani and the Vijayanagara Empires later.

The Rachakonda kingdom stretched up to Godavari in the north, Srisailam in the south, Bahamani kingdom in the west and Kondaveedu in the east.

The Rachakonda kings initially supported the Bahamani Kingdom but later in the war between the Bahamanis and Vijayanagara kings in 1424 AD, they switched their allegiance to the Vijayanagara Kingdom. This enraged the Bhamani sultan Firoz Shah who later signed a peace treaty with Vijyanagara and attacked the Rachakonda kingdom and conquered it. By the year 1433 AD, only a few forts remained in the control of kings of Rachakonda.

The Rachakonda kings then sought the help of Kapileswara Gajapati of Orissa and also promised him large amounts of money. He sent his son Hamviradeva (known as Ambar Roy to the Muslims) along with a large army to help the Rachakonda kings. By 1461 AD, the Rachakonda kings recovered all their lost forts and became kings of Orugallu with the help of Hamviradeva but in turn lost their independence and became tributaries of the Gajapatis of Orissa.

The Bahmani kingdom under Nizam Shah again attacked Orugallu in 1475 AD and the Kingdom was annexed by the sultan. Thus the Rachakonda kingdom originated in 1350-60 AD and was finally consumed by the Bahamanis in the year 1475 AD.

The Rachakonda and Devarakonda kings supported the Bahamani Sultan's for sometime, the Vijayanagara kings for sometime and the Gajapatis of Orissa for sometime and fought with their respective enemies.
