= 1378 =

1378 in various calendars
- Gregorian calendar: 1378; MCCCLXXVIII
- Ab urbe condita: 2131
- Armenian calendar: 827; ԹՎ ՊԻԷ
- Assyrian calendar: 6128
- Balinese saka calendar: 1299–1300
- Bengali calendar: 784–785
- Berber calendar: 2328
- English Regnal year: 1 Ric. 2 – 2 Ric. 2
- Buddhist calendar: 1922
- Burmese calendar: 740
- Byzantine calendar: 6886–6887
- Chinese calendar: 丁巳年 (Fire Snake); 4075 or 3868 — to — 戊午年 (Earth Horse); 4076 or 3869
- Coptic calendar: 1094–1095
- Discordian calendar: 2544
- Ethiopian calendar: 1370–1371
- Hebrew calendar: 5138–5139
- Hindu calendars
- Vikram Samvat: 1434–1435
- Shaka Samvat: 1299–1300
- Kali Yuga: 4478–4479
- Holocene calendar: 11378
- Igbo calendar: 378–379
- Iranian calendar: 756–757
- Islamic calendar: 779–780
- Japanese calendar: Eiwa 4 (永和４年)
- Javanese calendar: 1291–1292
- Julian calendar: 1378; MCCCLXXVIII
- Korean calendar: 3711
- Minguo calendar: 534 before ROC 民前534年
- Nanakshahi calendar: −90
- Thai solar calendar: 1920–1921
- Tibetan calendar: མེ་མོ་སྦྲུལ་ལོ་ (female Fire-Snake); 1504 or 1123 or 351 — to — ས་ཕོ་རྟ་ལོ་ (male Earth-Horse); 1505 or 1124 or 352

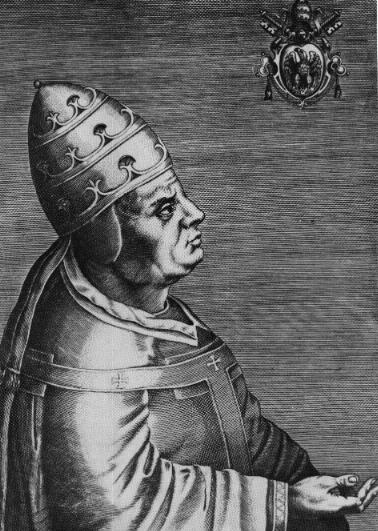
April 9: Urban VI elected Pope in Rome

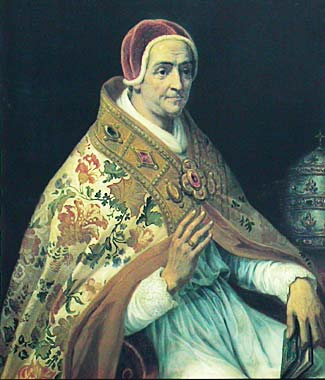
September 20: Antipope Clement VII elected in Avignon

Europe in 1378 after the Western Schism: Blue nations allied with the Church in Rome, pink nations allied with the Church in Avignon

Year 1378 (MCCCLXXVIII) was a common year starting on Friday of the Julian calendar.

== Events ==
=== January–March ===
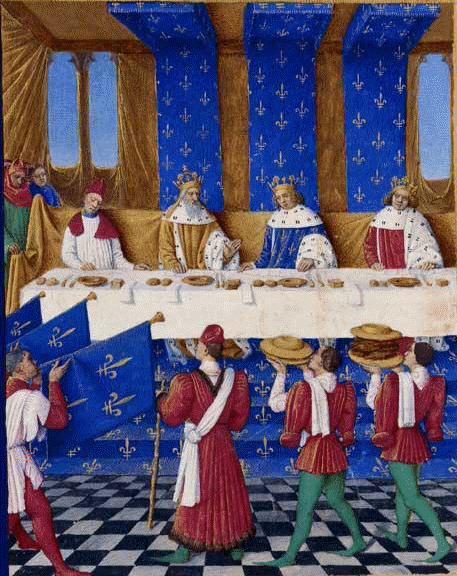
January 6: The Banquet of the Three Kings is hosted in Paris.

- January 6 – At the Great Hall of the Conciergerie in Paris, King Charles V of France hosts the Banquet of the Three Kings with his uncle, Charles IV, Holy Roman Emperor and the Emperor's son, Wenzel the Idle, King of the Romans as his guests (along with 800 German and French knights), to celebrate the friendship between the nations. The banquet, held on the day of the Feast of the Epiphany, has three courses, with 10 dishes in each course.
- January 13 – Balša II succeeds his brother, Durađ I, as ruler of Lower Zeta in what is now Montenegro.
- January 14 – King Richard II opens the Irish Parliament for the first time since the death of his father, King Edward III, a year earlier.
- February 6 – King Charles V of France is widowed when his queen consort, Joanna dies at age 40, two days after giving birth to their last child, Catherine. Against medical advice, Queen Joanna had taken a hot bath in order to induce labor.
- February 12 – Alexius, Metropolitan of Kiev and spiritual leader of the Russian Orthodox Church since 1354, dies of old age and his designated successor, Cyprian, Metropolitan of Lithuania, attempts to become the new leader. However, Grand Prince Dmitry Donskoy of Moscow denies Cyprian permission and appoints Pimen as successor to Alexius.
- February 19 – In England, John Wycliffe, who has been trying to promote ideas for Catholic reform and has published a tract outlining his theses, appears at the Church of St. Paul before a group of bishops headed by the Archbishop of Canterbury, Simon of Sudbury, to defend his actions. With a citation having directed him to appear "on the thirtieth court-day" after receipt, Wycliffe arrives before the bishops to proceed with trial, but proceedings are halted when Sir Lewis Clifford, dispatched by Joan of Kent, Princess of Wales, acting as the regent for her son, King Richard II the Kingdom, directs that the bishops are "not to presume to determine anything against John Wycliffe. According to a chronicler, "Struck with terror, they at once abandoned the business of their meeting," but they subsequently order Wycliffe to appear at Lambeth in March.
- March 27 – Pope Gregory XI dies at the Vatican in Rome after a little more than seven years as leader of the Roman Catholic Church, and shortly after moving the church leadership back to Rome from the French city of Avignon. Officials of Rome begin a campaign of intimidation to prevent the Roman Catholic cardinals, a majority of whom are French, from electing a French cardinal as Gregory's successor.

=== April–June ===
- April 9 – Following the death of Pope Gregory XI, and riots in Rome calling for a Roman pope, the cardinals, who are mostly French, meet in a papal conclave and elect an Italian from Naples, Bartolomeo Prignano, Archbishop of Bari, as the 202nd Pope. Prignano takes the regnal name Pope Urban VI, and is the last Pope of the Roman Catholic Church to have been elected from outside of the College of Cardinals. The French cardinals then flee from Rome before the populace learns that a non-Roman was picked, and return to Avignon, beginning the Western Schism, a 39-year period where rival popes are selected at Avignon and Rome.
- April 16 – Mujahid Shah, ruler of the Bahmani Sultanate in what is now the Karnataka state in southern India, is assassinated by his uncle, Da'ud Shah, while traveling between Adoni and Kulbarga. Da'ud and three accomplices enter Mujahid's tent and stab him to death, after which Da'ud declares himself to be the new Sultan of Bahmani.
- April 18 – The coronation of Pope Urban VI takes place in Rome on Easter Sunday.
- May 21 – After only five weeks as Sultan of Bahmani in India, Da'ud Shah is assassinated while praying in the grand mosque at the capital, Kalaburagi. Da'ud Shah is succeeded by one of his nephews, Mahmud Shah.
- May 26 – Uskhal Khan Tögüs Temür succeeds his father, Biligtü Khan Ayushiridara, as ruler of the Northern Yuan dynasty in Mongolia.
- May 30 – The War of Chioggia begins on the Italian peninsula between the navies of the Republic of Venice and the Republic of Genoa, with a surprise attack on 11 Genoese galleys at Capo d'Anzio by a 10-galley fleet led by Venetian Admiral Vettor Pisani. Venice captures five of the Genoese ships and takes their crews as prisoners of war, including the Genoese admiral, Luigi de' Fieschi.
- June 17 – In the wake of the recent defeat of the Genoese Navy at the battle of Capo d'Anzio, Domenico di Campofregoso, Doge of the Republic of Genoa, is removed from office by the Genoese Senate and replaced by Nicolò Guarco.

=== July–September ===
- July 21 – The Ciompi Revolt becomes violent in the Republic of Florence as a group of 64 discontented wool carders, led by Salvestro de' Medici, briefly take over the government of Florence and place Michele di Lando in the executive office.
- August 4 – Gian Galeazzo Visconti succeeds his father, Galeazzo II Visconti, as ruler of Milan.
- August 11 – Battle of the Vozha River: Prince Dmitri Ivanovich of Moscow resists a small invasion by the Mongol Blue Horde under Mamai.
- September 3 – As regent for the 11-year-old King Richard II of England, his mother Joan of Kent summons the English Parliament, directing the members of the House of Commons and the House of Lords to assemble at Gloucester on October 20.
- September 20 – Unhappy with Pope Urban's critical attitude towards them, the majority of the cardinals meet at Fondi, elect Clement VII as antipope, and establish a rival papal court at Avignon. This split within the Catholic Church becomes known as the Western Schism, also known as the Great Schism. France, Aragon, Castile and León, Cyprus, Burgundy, Savoy, Naples and Scotland choose to recognise Antipope Clement VII. Denmark, England, Flanders, the Holy Roman Empire, Hungary, northern Italy, Ireland, Norway, Poland and Sweden continue to recognise Pope Urban VI.

=== October–December ===
- October 22 – Sir James Pickering is elected as Speaker of the English House of Commons.
- October 31 – The coronation of Count Onorato Caetani as the antipope Clement VII takes place in Italy at Fondi at the cathedral of San Pietro adjacent to the Caetani palace. Clement operates as a rival leader of the Roman Catholic Church for about a year before he and his cardinals relocate to Avignon.
- November 10 – The first observation of Halley's Comet from Earth is made, based on an estimate from orbital calculations.
- November 16 – The English Parliament concludes its session after four weeks, and royal assent is given to new laws passed during the session, including the Scandalum Magnatum Act 1378, prescribing penalties for "telling slanderous lies of the great men of the realm", the Pope Urban VI Act 1378 (declaring that Urban "was duly chosen pope, and so ought to be accepted and obeyed," and the Riots Act 1378 granting authority to award commissions to persons to arrest rioters }and other persons offensive to the peace."
- November 29 – Charles IV, Holy Roman Emperor, dies in Prague. He is succeeded by his son, Wenceslaus, as King of Bohemia, but the office of Holy Roman Emperor falls into abeyance, until Charles's son Sigismund is crowned in 1433.
- December 16 – The antipope Clement VII declares nine clerics to be added as cardinals of the Roman Catholic Church, joining those already allied with him as part of the Avignon Obedience against the cardinals of Pope Urban VI. Among the new "pseudo-cardinals", assigned to secure allegiance to the Antipope Clement from other European nations are Niccolò Brancaccio, Nicolas de Saint-Saturnin, Pierre Raimundi de Barrière Mirepoix, and Giacomo d'Itri.

=== Date unknown ===
- The Sukhothai Kingdom in northern Thailand becomes a tributary state of the Ayutthaya Kingdom.
- The Raseborg Castle is mentioned for the first time in documents, but its actual date of foundation is unknown.
- Tokhtamysh dethrones Temur-Malik to become Khan of the White Horde.
- Uthman Beg establishes the Aq Qoyunlu (Turkomans of the White Sheep) dynasty at Diyarbakır, in modern-day southeast Turkey.
- Ottoman Turks capture the town of Ihtiman in west Bulgaria.
- Tai Bian succeeds Zhao Bing Fa as King of Mong Mao (modern-day northern Myanmar).
- Sa'im al-Dahr is hanged for blowing the nose off the Great Sphinx of Giza.

== Births ==
- January 23 – Louis III, Elector Palatine (d. 1436)
- May 27 – Zhu Quan, Chinese military commander, historian and playwright (d. 1448)
- August 16 – Hongxi Emperor of China (d. 1425)
- October 24 – David Stewart, Duke of Rothesay, heir to throne of Scotland (d. 1402)
- December 31 – Pope Callixtus III (d. 1458)
- date unknown
  - Vittorino da Feltre, Italian humanist (d. 1446)
  - Joan II, Countess of Auvergne, French vassal (d. 1424)
  - Lorenzo Ghiberti, Italian sculptor and metal-worker (d. 1455)
  - John Hardyng, English chronicler (d. 1465)
  - Narasimha Saraswati - Indian Guru and Saint

== Deaths ==
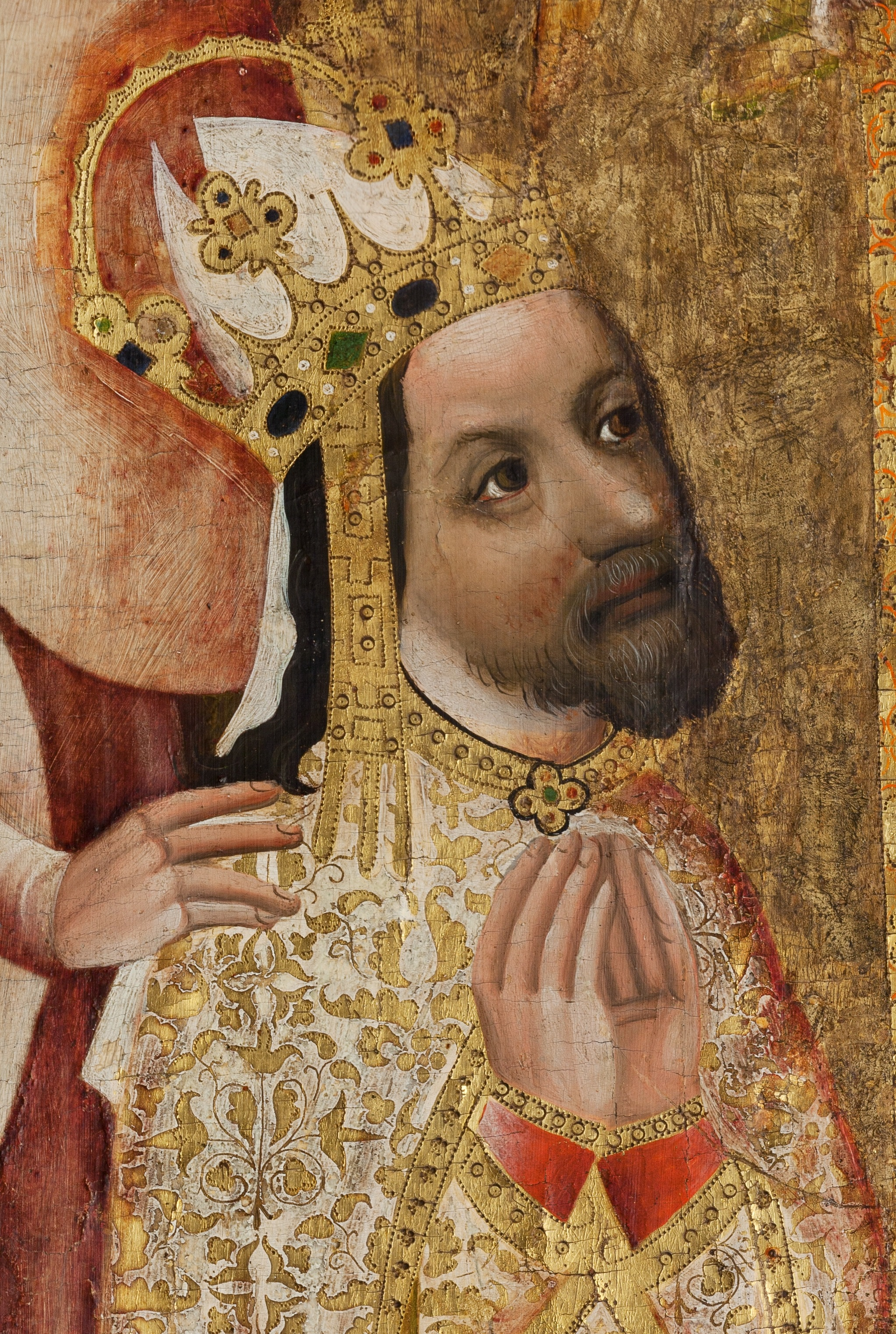
Charles IV, Holy Roman Emperor

- February 6 – Joanna of Bourbon, queen consort of Charles V of France (b. 1338)
- March 27 – Pope Gregory XI (b. c. 1329)
- July – Owain Lawgoch, titular Prince of Wales and mercenary – assassinated (b. c. 1330)
- August 4 – Galeazzo II Visconti, Lord of Milan (b. c. 1320)
- November 29 – Charles IV, Holy Roman Emperor (b. 1316)
- November 30 – Andrew Stratford, English verderer and landowner
