= Bahmani–Vijayanagar War (1417–1419) =

War between the Vijayanagara Empire and Bahamani Sultanate

Bahamani-Vijayanagra War (1417–1419)
- Part of Bahmani–Vijayanagar Wars
Date	1417–1419
Location	Telangana, Karnataka, Maharashtra
Result	Vijayanagara victory
Territorial changes	The Vijayanagara Empire annexed territory stretching from the Krishna River to the Tungabhadra River doab, which included the capture of the Pangal fort.

Belligerents
Bahamani Sultanate	Vijayanagara Empire; Recherla Nayakas

Commanders and leaders
Firoz Shah Bahmani	Deva Raya I

Casualties and losses
- During the war, Vijayanagara forces massacred Muslims on the battlefield and displayed their heads across the field.

The Bahmani–Vijayanagar War began with the Siege of Pangal, where Sultan Firuz Shah of the Bahmani Sultanate attempted to capture the fort. They faced setbacks, including a disease outbreak among their ranks, leading to the failure of the siege. In response, Deva Raya I of the Vijayanagara Empire launched a successful counteroffensive, defeating Sultan Firuz Shah in a decisive battle. This victory dealt a significant blow to the Bahmani Sultanate, ultimately leading to Firuz Shah's demise and further weakening of his empire.

Following the victory, Deva Raya I expanded his territorial control, extending Vijayanagara's domain up to the Krishna-Tungabhadra river doab region. This expansion included the capture of Pangal, which had been a focal point of the conflict. The successful outcome of the war significantly bolstered the power and influence of the Vijayanagara Empire in the region. In the aftermath, Muslim soldiers' severed heads were put on display at the battlefield as a reminder of Vijayanagara's triumph.

== Background ==
=== Siege of Pangal ===
Taj ud-Din Firuz Shah initiated a siege on the fort of Pangal, which was under the control of the Recherla Nayakas. It lasted two years, while a disease outbreak within the Bahmani Sultanate camp weakened his forces, leading to his failure to capture the fort and subsequent heavy losses. Taking advantage of this vulnerable situation, the king of Vijayanagar sought revenge for previous humiliations suffered during the previous war, pursuing and defeating Sultan Feroz. Reports suggest that treachery within the Bahamani camp contributed significantly to this defeat.

== War ==
The two-year siege was impregnable, causing great distress to the besiegers due to famine and disease. Devaraya, bolstered by fresh forces and Hindu chiefs like the Velamas, encircled the besieging army. As the Muslim army weakened and Vijayanagara reinforcements arrived, the garrison sallied from the fort, attacking the enemy camp. Caught between two Hindu forces, the Bahmani army was routed, and the Sultan fled. Devaraya I exploited this victory to regain control over the Krishna-Tungabhadra region.

The result of Sultan Feroz's defeat was dire, as Deva Raya, the king of Vijayanagar, retaliated by orchestrating a general massacre of Muslims, using their heads to create a gruesome platform on the battlefield. His forces pursued the Sultan's retreating army into their own territory, inflicting further devastation by razing mosques, holy sites, and mercilessly slaughtering civilians. Even regions as far as Konkan, including Chowl and Dabhol, fell victim to the Hindu army's aggression. In a state of desperation, Sultan Feroz sought assistance from the Sultan of Gujarat, only to find the newly ascended monarch unable to provide aid.

== Aftermath ==
The series of reverses suffered by Firuz Shah ultimately led to his demise. Mirat-i-Sikandari records that Sultan Feroz had led an army against Vijayanagar and was defeated in battle. Fortunately for him, Sultan Ahmad of Gujarat, bound by a friendly alliance, dispatched a substantial army to his aid. By the time that army reached the fort of Thallir, Sultan Feroz had already died, and his brother, Sultan Ahmad Shah Bahamani, had ascended to power. In acknowledgment of the support received, Sultan Ahmad Shah Wali sent valuable gifts to Sultan Ahmad of Gujarat and sent his army back. Deva Raya I came to control territory up to the Krishna River - Tungabhadra River doab including Pangal. However, all the territory captured by Deva Raya was lost by his son Vira Vijaya to Ahmad Shah during the Siege of Vijayanagar in 1423.
