= Gundmi =

- town Panchayat
- Location in Karnataka, India
- Coordinates: 13°28′50″N 74°42′45″E
- Country: India
- State: Karnataka
- District: Udupi District

Population (2011)
  - Total: 16,011

Languages
  - Official: Kannada
- Time zone: UTC+5:30 (IST)
- PIN: 576226
- Telephone code: 0820
- Vehicle registration: KA-20

Gundmi is a panchayat town in Udupi Taluk in Udupi district in the Indian state of Karnataka. Gundmi town is one of the oldest towns in India.

It is a small town about 6 km north of Bramavara City close to the border between the two southern states of Karnataka and Kerala. It comprises two revenue villages, Gundmi and Pandeshwar, Irody, yadabettu in Udupi Taluk. Gundmi is located adjacent to City Corporation of Udupi at a distance of 20 km from District Headquarters.

Gundmi is noted for historic locations such as Barkuru basadi, Barakuru Maalik Deenar Masjid, Beach Resort, Barkur's Fort, Shri Ammanavara Temple, Gundmi juma masjid, SKSM Salafi Center Gundmi Unit, Mani Chennakeshava Temple, Saint Thomas Church, and Divine park.

This town is an important trading centre for fish and fish manure. Fishing and beedi rolling are main occupations of the residents of this town.

== Location ==
14.6 km N of Malpe, 15.1 km NxNW of Udipi, 17.0 km S of Kundapura, 19.5 km SxSE of Gangolli.
