= Bahmani–Vijayanagar War (1375–1378) =

War between the Bahmani Sultanate and Vijayanagara Empire

Bahmani–Vijayanagara War (1375–1378)
- Part of Bahmani–Vijayanagar Wars
Date	June 1375 – March 1378
Location	Karnataka
Result	See § Aftermath

Belligerents
Bahmani Sultanate	Vijayanagara Empire

Commanders and leaders
Mujahid Shah (WIA); Daud Shah Bahmani; Muqarrab Khan †; Saifudin Ghori (POW); Prince Fath Khan (POW); Safdar Khan Sistani; Amir-ul-Umra; Bahadur Khan; Azam-i-Humayun	Bukka Raya; Chenappa Odeyar

Casualties and losses
Unknown	60,000–70,000 Prisoners captured from Vijayanagara

The Bahmani–Vijayanagar War of 1375–1378 between the Bahmani Sultanate and the Vijayanagara Empire began under the reign of Vijayanagara ruler Bukka Raya I, who faced renewed conflict with the Bahmani Sultanate, stemming from past territorial disputes. After a period of relative calm following previous military campaigns, tensions resurfaced when Mujahid, the Sultan of Gulbarga, demanded the surrender of forts and territories in the Doab region. Bukka, unwilling to concede, asserted his claim over the disputed territories.

This led to a series of clashes, with both sides mobilizing their forces. Bukka adopted defensive tactics, avoiding direct confrontation and retreating to the hills, while Mujahid's forces ravaged the countryside. Eventually, the conflict escalated into a siege of Vijayanagar, marked by fierce battles and strategic maneuvers. Amidst the chaos, internal strife within the Bahmani Sultanate resulted in Mujahid's assassination and Daud's brief but tumultuous rule. Meanwhile, Bukka capitalized on the instability, expanding Vijayanagara's territory and advancing towards the Krishna River. However, shortly thereafter, Bukka died, leaving his son Harihara to inherit the throne amidst a landscape of shifting alliances and ongoing conflict.

== Background ==
After a period of relative calm following his military campaign's in South India, Bukka found himself embroiled in another conflict in 1375 A.D. This resurgence of hostilities was rooted in longstanding grievances stemming from Mohammad Shah's earlier incursion into the Doab region. Despite a peace treaty brokered in January 1368 A.D., dissatisfaction lingered among both parties. Tensions reignited when Mujahid, the newly appointed Sultan of Gulbarga, demanded that Bukka cede control of specific forts and territories situated on the eastern side of the Doab, between the Krishna and Tungabhadra rivers. These areas were jointly controlled by the Vijayanagar and Bahmani Kingdom, leading to frequent clashes over jurisdiction.

Mujahid urged the Vijayanagar ruler to limit his domain to the western bank of the Tungabhadra river in the future. In response, Bukka asserted that the true boundary lay along the Krishna river and demanded the Sultan's withdrawal from the entire Doab region. Furthermore, Bukka laid claim to Raichur and Mudgal as ancestral territories of the Anegondi family and requested the return of elephants seized by Mujahid's father during the previous war. With neither side willing to concede, the Bahmani Sultan declared war and mobilized forces towards Adoni, crossing both the Krishna and Tungabhadra rivers in the process.

== Clashes ==
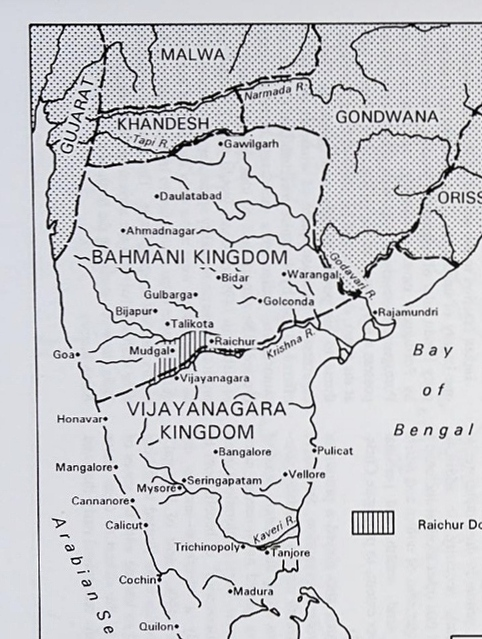
Map showing Raichur Doab.

In response to the impending Bahmani army's advance, Bukka adopted a familiar strategy, positioning his forces along the banks of the Tungabhadra river. Upon learning of these defensive measures, the Bahmani Sultan divided his troops into three groups, assigning one to lay siege to Adoni, another to Vijayanagar, and leading the third himself to confront Bukka's forces. However, Bukka once again opted to avoid direct confrontation, retreating to the rugged terrain of the Setu-Bundh-Rameshwar hills.

The Sultan directed Safdar Khan Sistani to initiate a siege on the Adoni. Meanwhile, Amir-ul-Umra, Bahadur Khan and Azam-i-Humayun were tasked with advancing towards Vijayanagar. The Sultan himself embarked on a journey towards Gangawati on the Tungabhadra, proceeding slowly as he had received information about Bukka's encampment in that area. This action made it challenging for the Sultan's forces to pursue him effectively.

Over the course of six months, Bukka continued to evade the enemy, while Mujahid's army ravaged the surrounding countryside, desecrating Hindu temples in their path. Eventually, Bukka's health, as well as that of his family, began to deteriorate due to the hardships of forest life. Consequently, he decided to return to Vijayanagar through an alternate route, where he prepared to defend the city. The Bahmani Sultan swiftly followed suit, joining his besieging forces and engaging in a blockade around the walls of Vijayanagar.

=== Siege of Vijayanagar ===
The siege of Vijayanagar commenced with full force, marked by various degrees of success. According to Ferista, Mujahid managed to penetrate the suburbs and outer fortifications on one occasion, where he ordered the destruction of a renowned temple. In the battle, Azam-i Humayun led the left flank, while Bahadur Khan commanded the right. Muqarrab Khan, son of Safdar Khan Sistani, oversaw the artillery. Muqarrab Khan directed the bombardment of the enemy with gun carriages, nearly routing them. However, the tide turned when the Raya arrived with a massive army of eight thousand cavalry and six lacs of infantry. The ensuing conflict resulted in a general massacre, during which Muqarrab Khan was killed.

Dawud Khan, the Sultan’s cousin, joined the fray with seven thousand infantry, fighting valiantly despite losing three horses and being forced to the ground. Despite their brave efforts, the besiegers were kept at bay. Shortly thereafter, Chenappa Odeyar arrived with reinforcements, including 20,000 horsemen and a large contingent of foot soldiers from the provinces, bolstered the defense under the leadership of the Raya. Additionally, the strategic blunder committed by Daud, the Sultan’s uncle, who abandoned a crucial post at Dhonnasandra, further compounded the Muslims' predicament by cutting off their retreat. Faced with a perilous situation, The enemy forces capitalized on Daud Khan's actions, seizing the abandoned position and posing a serious threat to the Sultan's retreat. For five or six months, Mujahid pursued him through the jungles of the Carnatic, but was unable to engage him in battle. Eventually, Bukka managed to evade him and seek refuge in Vijayanagar. Mujahid continued his pursuit, breached the outer defenses of the city, and defeated successive Hindu forces sent against him. Consequently, the Sultan decided to withdraw from the battlefield, employing strategic actions to ensure the safe extraction of his entire army from the hills, during the retreat from Vijayanagar, the Sultan eventually laid siege to Adoni.

Daud Khan's failure to hold a defile, which he was entrusted to defend, jeopardized their retreat. Despite this, they managed to force their way through the defile and withdrew towards Adoni with sixty or seventy thousand captives, whose lives were spared according to the pact made by his father. The Vijayanagar forces captured two Muslim officers, Saifudin Ghori and Prince Fath Khan, and imprisoned them. Bukka was afraid to pursue them, and Mujahid besieged Adoni for nine months. Just as the city was about to surrender, the onset of the rainy season replenished the garrison's water supply, causing distress in the besiegers' camp. Saif-ud-din Ghuri persuaded Mujahid to lift the siege, and peace was established with Bukka. Subsequently, Mujahid set out for his capital.

== Aftermath ==
=== Accounts of the outcome ===
The Cambridge History of India, published during the Raj era, documents a peace treaty between Bukka Raya and Mujahid, (Note: "Bukka feared to follow, and Mujahid besieged Adoni for nine months, and was on the point of receiving its surrender when the rainy season began, replenished the water supply of the garrison, and caused much distress in the besiegers’ camp. Saif-ud-din Ghuri persuaded him to raise the siege, peace was made with Bukka, and Mujahid set out for his capital.") though the New Cambridge History of India suggests that Mujahid Shah's campaign was successful against the Vijayanagara empire. While other sources conflict in defining this event as a Bahmani failure.

=== Crisis ===
Daud harbored deep resentment over his mistreatment and, along with other discontented nobles, conspired in secret to assassinate the Sultan. They waited until Mujahid was traveling from Adoni towards Kulbarga, and on the night of Friday, 16 April, A.D. 1378, while the Sultan slept in his tent, Daud and three accomplices stormed in and fatally stabbed him after a struggle ensued. With Mujahid having no children, Daud promptly declared himself Sultan as the nearest kin and was subsequently acknowledged as such upon reaching Gulbarga, where he was officially proclaimed.

However, Daud's ascent to power was short-lived, as the country quickly split into two opposing factions. On 21 May, A.D. 1378, after just one month of reign, Daud himself was assassinated while praying in the grand mosque of the capital. Meanwhile, Bukka Raya seized the opportunity to expand his territory, conquering the Doab region and advancing as far as the Krishna River, where he laid siege to the fortress of Raichur. Shortly after these events, Bukka died, and his son Harihara succeeded him as the ruler of Vijayanagar.
