= Udupi (disambiguation) =

Udupi may refer to:

- Udupi city in Karnataka, India
- Udupi taluk in Karnataka, India
- Udupi district in Karnataka, India
- Udupi Chikmagalur (Lok Sabha constituency)
- Udupi cuisine, a cuisine of South India
- Udupi Krishna Temple

== Notable people with the surname ==
- Udupi Ramachandra Rao (1932–2017), Indian space scientist
