= List of festivals of Gaud Saraswat Brahmins =

== Selected list of festivals celebrated by GSBs ==
| Festival name | Date - Hindu lunar calendar | Date - Gregorian calendar | Deity or object worshipped | Duration | Description |
|---|---|---|---|---|---|
| Ugadi or Samsar Padva | 1st day of Chaitra | March–April | | Example | Ugadi or Samsar Padava is the new year day of Hindu lunar calendar (last week of March). Ugadi is derived from the words Yuga Aadi (Yuga + Aadi meaning "Beginning of New era"). According to Bramha Purana, Lord Brahma started creation on this day - Chaitra shuddha padhyami or the Ugadi day. It also commemorate the victory of Rama over Vali, a South Indian King. In temples the New Panchang or almanac is ceremoniously released and the Samvatsara Phala or the predictions for the whole year are read out. New clothes are put on. In some families there is a system of "kappad vadap" which means dedication of saris and dhotis to the memory of the departed souls with an offering of food or sweet beaten rice and an aarti. The head of the family does it without the assistance of a priest and after food, the dhoti will be put on by him and sari, his wife. |
| Ram Navami and Hanuman Jayanthi | 9th day and full moon day of Chaitra | March–April | Rama, Hanuman | Example | Ram navami and Hanuman jayanti, the birthdays of Shree Ramchandra and Hanuman respectively are also celebrated in the month of Chaitra. |
| Wata Pournima | Full moon day of Ashada | July | Husband | Example | Is women's festival where women tie threads around a banyan (wad) tree and pray for the same husband in every birth (after Satyavaan-Saavitri's story). |
| Naga Panchami | 5th Day of Shravan | July–August | Nāga | Example | Celebrated on the 5th day of the bright fortnight in the month of Shravan. Milk is offered to naga idols with arti and prayers to nagas. The festival falls during the rainy months and is believed to counter the increased possibility of a snake bite during this time. People visit Naga temples worship them. Shiva temples are also favoured places for veneration as snakes are considered dear to him. In South India, people craft images of snakes using cow dung on either side of the entrance to the house to welcome the snake god. The practice of worshipping the snake on this day is related to many legends. Nag Panchami is believed as the victory day of Krishna over the Kaliya snake. |
| Sutta Punav | Full moon day of Shravan | Aug | Yajnopavita or the sacred jannuvey | Example | On this Shravan full moon day, GSB men worship and change the sacred thread also called as jannuvey. In northern India, this day is celebrated as Raksha bandhan. |
| Janmashtami | 23rd day of Shravan | Aug–September | Krishna | | Birthday of Lord Krishna on Shravan Vadya ashtami is observed with a fast. |
| Ganesh Chaturthi | 4th day of Bhaadrapada | August–September | Ganapati | 1.5 to 10 days | Festival of Lord Ganesh. On the previous day, Gowri Pooja is performed by the women. The Ganesh Puja is performed by men. Mahalaya amavasya||15 day of Bhaadrapada|| pritra tarpan is performing in this day |
| Navaratri | Ashvin | September–October | Parvati(all forms), Lakshmi, Saraswathi | Nine nights, ten days | Navaratri literally means nine nights (Nav = nine; Ratri = nights). The first 9 days of the Ashwin Shukla Paksha constitute Navaratri with the worship of Mother Goddess. On the first three days, the Mother is invoked as powerful force called Durga in order to destroy all our impurities, vices and defects. The next three days, the Mother is adored as a giver of spiritual wealth, Lakshmi, who is considered to have the power of bestowing on her devotees the inexhaustible wealth. The final set of three days is spent in worshipping the mother as the goddess of wisdom, Saraswati. In West Bengal, Navaratri is celebrated as Durga pooja. It lasts for nine days in honour of the nine manifestations of Durga. This commemorates the victory of Goddess Durga over the Asura Mahishasur. The battle between Goddess Durga and the Asura lasted for 9 days and 9 nights. Finally, on the tenth day, Goddess Durga killed Mahisha asura. This day is known as Vijayadasami meaning the 10th day of victory. Idols of Goddess Durga are worshipped for nine days and on the tenth day, the immersion of idols in sea is performed. The nine different manifestations of Durga worshipped over the nine days are - Durga, Bhadrakali, Amba or Jagdamba, Annapurna, Sarvamangala, Bhairavi, Chandika or handi, Lalita and Bhavani. |
| Diwali | 1st day of Kartik | October–November | Rama, Krishna, Lakshmi | 4 days | The festival of lights is celebrated over five days. The Deshasthas celebrate this in their unique style by waking up early in the morning and having an oil bath. People light their houses with, lamps, and burst fire crackers over the course of the festival. Special sweets and savouries are prepared for the festival. Colorful Rangoli are made in front of the house. |
| Kartik Ekadashi | 11th day of Kartik | | Vishnu | Example | This is the 11th day of kartik bright fortnight or the Kartik Ekadashi and is regarded as the day of Lord Hari or Vishnu. This day also coincides with the end of Vishnu's four months sleep, known as Prabodidhiny ekadasi (Awaking Eleventh). Devotees are said to observe fasts and rigorous penances to seek knowledge. All meritorious actions done on this day are said to return with thousandfold credits. Perhaps this has the link with Sun's movement to the southern hemisphere and the Winter. |
| Tulsi Pooja | 12th day of Kartik | October–November | Example | Example | This is celebrated on the 12th day of the first half or Shukla Paksha of the month of Kartik to commemorate the marriage of Vishnu and Tulsi. Tulsi is one of the most sacred plants of the Hindus and is believed to be the incarnation of Vrinda, the virtuous wife of Jalandhar. On this day the Tulsi Vrindavan at houses is smeared with cow dung. Sugarcane is buried in it, and avale (fruits of the avali tree) and wet chinch (fruits of the tamarind tree) are put on it. |
| Vaikunta Chaturdashi | 14th day of Kartik | October–November | Vishnu | Example | This is celebrated on the 14th day of the first fortnight. This day glorifies the relationship between Shiva and Vishnu. This is also the day Vishnu got his Chakra from Shiva. |
| Kartik Purnima | 15th day of Kartik | October–November | Shiva | Example | This falls on the 15th of the full moon day of Kartik, alluding to Shiva's destruction of the demon Tripura and signifies the subjugation of evil and fostering goodness. Fireworks and illuminations of houses make the God's celebration of their victory. It is therefore also called the Dev-Didiwali or Diwali of the Gods. |
| Vaikunta Ekadashi | 11th day of Pushya | December–January | Vishnu | Example | This is on the 11th day of the first fortnight. It was on this day that during the Sagara Mathana (churning of the ocean), Amrit (nectar) emerged from the ocean and was distributed to the Gods. Fasting is prescribed on all Ekadashis, that is, the 11th day of the lunar fortnight, twice a month. No rice should be taken on Ekadashi days. |
| Makara Sankranthi | | 13–15 January | Surya | Example | This holy day marks the commencement of the Sun's northern course in the Heavens - the Uttaraayana patha. This turn in the Sun's course takes place at the point of time when it enters the sign of Makara or Capricorn. From this day the day-duration increases and the night decreases. It is the harbinger of more light and sunshine in life and lessening of its darker aspects. |
| Maha Shivaratri | End of Magha | February–March | Shiva | Example | Maha Sivaratri is celebrated on the 14th night of the dark half or Krishna Paksha in the month of Magha. This is the night before the new-moon day in February–March. According to 'Shiva Purana' no festival other than Maha Shivaratri observed by devotees gives Shiva so much pleasure and satisfaction. According to a legend, it signifies the day on which Lord Shiva swallowed the deadly poison that emanated from the churning of the ocean of milk, which would have killed the Gods. Not knowing that it would not cause any harm to Him, all the Gods and Goddesses kept vigil throughout the night praying for His life. The prayer that was offered to Him that night is repeated since then on Shiva Ratri. The devotees observe strict religious discipline by abstaining from food for the day and keep themselves awake the whole night. 'Shiva Linga' is worshipped with 'vilwa' leaves throughout the night with chanting of the 'Panchakshyara Mantra' - "Om Namah Shivay" and Shiva's 1,008 names. The next morning, they take their bath and after worshipping Shiva again break their fasts. |

The other festivals unique to GSB's are-

- Kodial Teru- Held during January–February on the auspicious day of Ratha Sapthami. Procession of Lord Venkataramana in Mangalore.
- Karkala Teru- Procession of Lord Venkataramana in Karkala.
- Karkala Karthipunav-Sri Venkataramana and Sri Srinivas god procession to vhana and vhana bhojan
- Mulki Ramanavami Teru, mulki pratiste punav
- Bantwal Teru
- Manjeshwar Shasti Mahotsav. (Nov-Dec) Margashira Shuddha Pratipada to Saptami (7 days)
- Katapady Teru(Katapady Rahotsav)- Held during January–February, two days after Kodial Teru on the auspicious day of Madhwanavami. The festival last for a week prior to the Teru
- Shri Mahamaya Rathotsava- Held in Mangalore.
- Honavar teru - Procession of Lord Rama in Honavar occur during March - April
- Kundapur Teru - Lord Venkatramana sits on the Chariot (Ratha)and the procession on the Auspicious day of Ramnavami which occurs during March–April (according to the Lunar Calendar)
- Kumta teru - Procession of Lord Venkataramana on the auspicious day of Ratha sapthami in Kumta (normally held during January February)
- Belthangady Karthipunav-Sri Venkataramana god procession to vhana and vhana bhojan on next day okali or Holi festival is celebrating (November)
- Uppinangady Teru-shree laxmi venkataramana Held during January–February, two days after Kodial Teru on the auspicious day of Madhwanavami.
