= Bahmani–Vijayanagar War =

Bahmani–Vijayanagar War may refer to:

- Bahmani–Vijayanagara War (1362–1367), the first Bahmani–Vijayanagar War between Mohammed Shah I and Bukka Raya I
- Bahmani–Vijayanagar War (1375–1378), the second Bahmani-Vijayanagar War between Mujahid Shah and Bukka Raya I
- Bahmani–Vijayanagar War (1398), the third Bahmani–Vijayanagar War between Taj ud-Din Firuz Shah and Harihara II
- Bahmani–Vijayanagar War (1406), the fourth Bahmani–Vijayanagar War between Taj ud-Din Firuz Shah and Deva Raya I
- Bahmani–Vijayanagar War (1417–1419), the fifth Bahmani-Vijayanagar War between Taj ud-Din Firuz Shah and Dev Raya I
- Bahmani–Vijaynagar War (1423), the sixth Bahmani–Vijayanagar War between Ahmad Shah Bahmani and Vira Vijaya
- Bahmani–Vijayanagar War (1443), the seventh Bahmani–Vijayanagar War between Alau'd-din Ahmad Shah and Deva Raya II

== See also ==
- Bahmani Sultanate (c. 1347–1527), in medieval southern India
- Vijayanagara Empire (1336–1646), in medieval southern India
- Bahman (disambiguation)
- Bahmani, Iran (disambiguation)
- Vijaynagar (disambiguation)
