= Amangal =

- Mucinipality
- Location within Telangana Location within India
- Coordinates: 16.850°N 78.533°E
- Country: India
- State: Telangana
- District: Rangareddy

Population
  - Total: 19,000

Languages
  - Official: Telugu
- Time zone: UTC+5:30 (IST)
- PIN: 509321
- Telephone code: 08543
- Vehicle registration: TG-07
- Nearest city: Hyderabad
- Lok Sabha constituency: Nagarkurnool
- Vidhan Sabha constituency: Kalwakurthy
- Climate: hot (Köppen)

Amangal is a municipality in Ranga Reddy district of the Indian state of Telangana.

It is under Kalwkurthy vidhan sabha and Nagar kurnool loksabha constency .

It is located in Amangal mandal of Kandukur revenue division.

== Geography ==
Amangal is located at 16.850°N 78.533°E. It has an average elevation of 507 metres (1,663 ft).

== History ==
The Recharla Padmanayaka dynasty ruled Amangal as its capital in 13th century. Padmanayaka dynasty were the feudatories of Kakateeya kings. They ruled South part of Kakateeya kingdom with their capitals as Amangal, Rachakonda and Devarakonda.
