= Siege of Vijayanagara =

Military campaign of the Bahmanis in 1423

- Part of Bahmani–Vijayanagar Wars
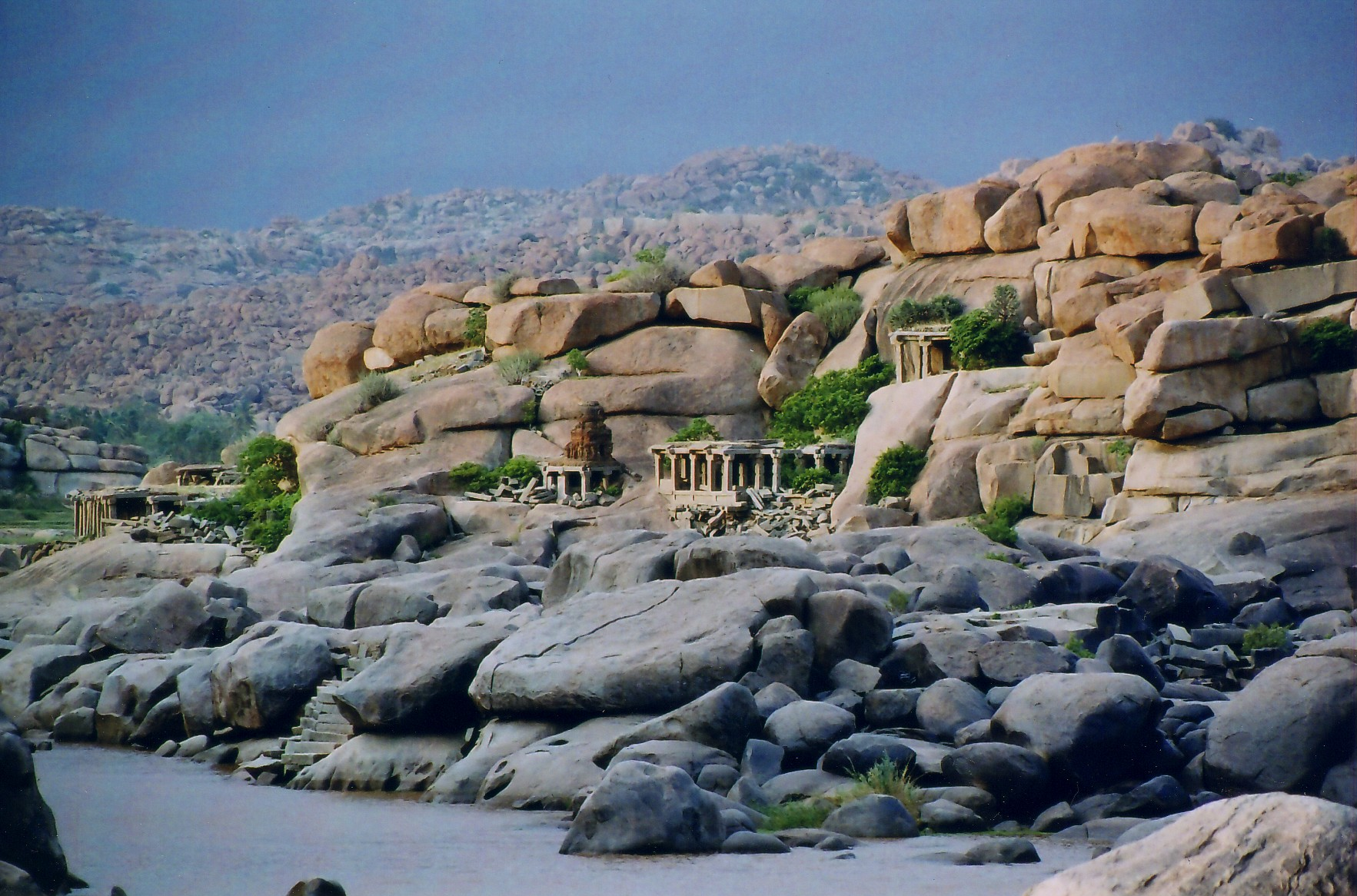
- Natural fortress of Vijayanagara
Date	1423
Location	Vijayanagara, present day Karnataka 15°20′04″N 76°27′44″E
Result	Bahmani victory
Territorial changes	All the lands captured by Vijayanagara at 1420 recaptured by the Bahmanis

Belligerents
Bahmani Sultanate	Vijayanagara Empire; Velama Chiefs

Commanders and leaders
Ahmad Shah Bahmani	Vira Vijaya (POW); Linga

Strength
40,000 horsemen	1,000,000

Casualties and losses
Unknown	20,000 massacred by sect, sects unknown.
- Location within Karnataka Siege of Vijayanagara (India)

The siege of Vijayanagara or Bahmani–Vijayanagara war of 1423 was a military campaign by the Bahmani Sultanate in the Deccan Plateau, led by Ahmad Shah I Wali, against the Vijayanagara empire, ruled by Vira Vijaya Bukka Raya III, beginning in 1423 in present-day Karnataka. The campaign resulted in a victory for the Bahmanis, leading to the recapture of all of the Sultanate's territories that had fallen into the hands of Vijayanagara during the war of 1420.

After their triumph in the war with the Bahmanis in 1420, the Vijayanagara empire carried out a massacre of the civilian population, violating the treaty signed between them during the war of 1367. Following the coronation of Ahmad Shah Wali after the death of his brother Tajuddin Firuz Shah, Ahmad sought revenge for his brother's defeat by assembling an army. Vira Vijaya, the king of Vijayanagara, opposed them with a vast army, supported by Velama Chiefs. However, they were repelled from Tungabhadra, and at one point, the Vijayanagara king was taken as a prisoner of war, though he later managed to escape.

Ahmad Shah retaliated by massacring the Vijayanagara population, seeking retribution for their actions in the earlier war. This led to the Vijayanagara ruler seeking peace, which he achieved by paying a large indemnity as a tribute and returning the lands taken from the Bahmanis in the war of 1420.

== Background ==
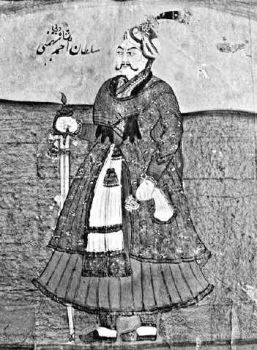
Ahmad Shah I Wali

During the Bahmani-Vijayanagara war of 1419, the majority of Bahmani territories were safeguarded by Ahmad Shah Wali, the brother of Tajuddin Firuz Shah, the Bahmani ruler. Following the war's failure, Firuz, weakened by illness and burdened by his own shortcomings and the stark contrast with Ahmad's successful defense of the kingdom, came to a stark realization. He understood increasingly that neither he nor his son Hassan could effectively govern the Sultanate without Ahmad's support. Consequently, he delegated more and more of the state affairs to his brother.

In 1413, a great saint, Hazrat Gesu Daraz, arrived in the capital of the Bahmanis, Gulbarga from Delhi and began to attract a large following to his place of retreat near the fort on the western side. An inevitable conflict arose between the Firuz and the saint, as Firuz, despite his scholarly knowledge, began to question the saint's intellectual worth. As tensions escalated, the saint relocated to the spot where his tomb now stands, a couple of miles from his khanqah. Meanwhile, Firuz's brother, Ahmad, recognized the spiritual and moral influence wielded by the saint and endeavored to garner favor with his disciples.

=== Fall of Firuz Shah ===
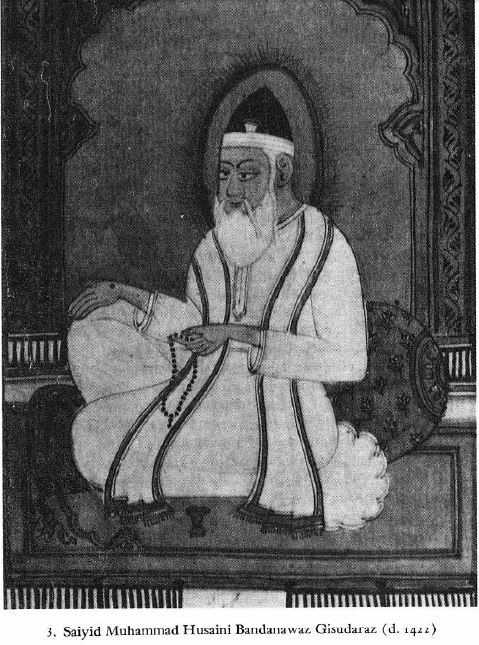
Portrait of Gesu Daraz

The close relationship between the saint and Ahmad sparked jealousy among Firuz's entourage, leading them to scheme against Ahmad. Two courtiers, Hoshiyar Ainul Mulk and Bidar Nizamul Mulk, advised the Sultan to blind Ahmad in order to eliminate him as a threat. Ahmad learned of this plot and discreetly left the capital with his trusted companion, Khalaf Hasan of Basra, accompanied by only 400 horsemen.

However, Ahmad soon found himself supported by an army of more than twenty thousand soldiers. In any case, there were individuals of influence around Firuz who had not aligned themselves with Ahmad and opted to resist forcefully. Ahmad gathered his supporters, comprising a majority of the army, and advanced towards Gulbarga. This led to a sporadic civil war, which the devastated country could scarcely sustain. Khalaf Hasan devised a clever strategy: he gathered four hundred oxen from the local banjaras and drove them directly into the enemy's camp. Under the cover of night, he launched a surprise attack on the Bahmani royal army, with real cavalry support from the rear. The army of Bahmani was overwhelmed by the stampede of its own elephants, and Ahmad emerged victorious, marching towards the capital.

Firuz, realizing the gravity of the situation, met Ahmad five miles outside the city. There was no fighting, as a significant portion of the royal army had defected to Ahmad's side on the battlefield. On 22 September 1422, the gates of the capital were opened for Ahmad. In a poignant moment, Firuz accepted the changed circumstances and led his victorious brother to the throne room. There, he ceremoniously fastened the sword of state to Ahmad's waist and assisted him in taking his seat on the turquoise throne.

The emotional confrontation between the two brothers culminated in a heartfelt embrace, with Firuz overcome with tears. Burhan-i Ma’asir vividly depicts the poignant scene as follows:

Ahmad: Your Majesty, I did all this for no other reason but to save my life.
Firoz: God be praised that the Kingdom is going to the rightful man. It was my fault that having a brother like you I tried to hand over the kingdom to a less worthy person. My last desire is that you should treat your nephew Hasan Khan with kindness as befits a man like you and regard my progeny with the love similar to that which I bear for you.

— Sayyid Ali Tabataba'i, Burhan-i Ma'asir,

Following these events, Firuz passed away within two weeks on 28 September 1422. Ahmad demonstrated great consideration for his nephew Hassan, with whom rumors suggested he had been negotiating even during the conflict. Despite advice from Ahmad's ministers, particularly Gesu daraz, urging the new Sultan to either confine the young prince strictly in prison or have him executed, Ahmad took a different approach. He appointed Hassan to a senior command in the army and granted him his father's palace at Firuzabad along with a generous estate. Additionally, he permitted Hassan to enjoy activities such as hunting and leisure in the vicinity, provided he sought permission before leaving. Hassan opted for these privileges over the challenging task of restoring the Sultanate's fallen fortunes, which demanded a focus on matters of war. During his uncle's reign, Hassan contentedly spent his time in quiet pursuits, accompanied by his wives, scholars, and horses. After his succession to the throne, Ahmad Shah moved the Bahmani capital from Gulbarga to Bidar, making Firuz the last ruler of the Bahmanis of Bidar.

=== Struggles at Vijayanagara ===
This internal conflict within the Bahmani Sultanate may have appeared to present Vijayanagara with an opportune moment to dismantle the Sultanate entirely. However, the Vijayanagara Empire was not in a position to capitalize on it. In the same year, 1422, the Palace of Vijayanagara was also embroiled in internal turmoil. It is possible that Deva Raya II's return from his campaigns north of the Krishna was prompted by awareness of the impending power struggle in Vijayanagara, thereby inadvertently aiding the Bahmanis. Additionally, Ahmad's cautious bid to seize the throne from his brother may have been influenced by the unfolding events in Vijayanagara, presenting him with an opportune moment. Alternatively, this convergence of events may simply have been one of the unpredictable twists of history.

== Prelude ==
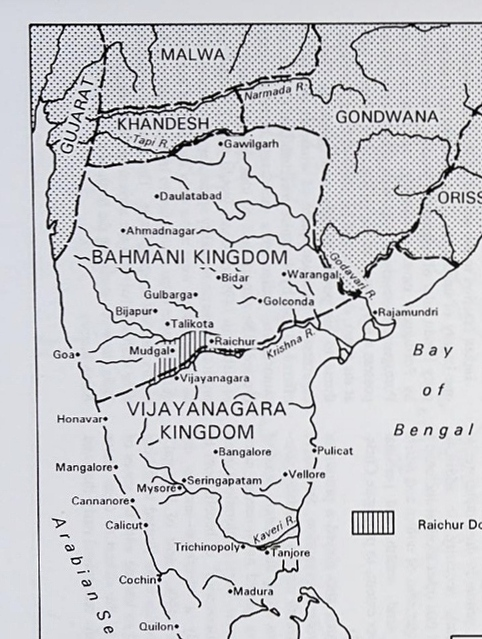
Bahmani-Vijayanagara border

After the significant loss of civilian lives in the Bahmani-Vijayanagara war of 1367, both Vijayanagara and Bahmani rulers recognized the need to minimize civilian casualties in future conflicts. They agreed to a treaty aimed at protecting innocent civilians during wars between them, which was signed by Muhammad Shah I and Bukka Raya I. This policy of avoiding harm to civilians was followed by Firuz Shah during his conflict with Vijayanagara in 1398. The policy was breached by Vijayanagara, as following Deva Raya's triumph in the war of 1420, he massacred the local Bahmani population, thus violating the treaty. In response, Ahmad Shah sought to avenge the massacre of non-combatants, which was the primary reason for launching the campaign. Therefore, Ahmad was determined to seek retribution for his brother's defeat during the final years of his reign.

=== Preparations of the Bahmanis ===
Ahmad focused primarily on strengthening the army, a task he was well-versed in. In addition to bolstering the royal forces and mobilizing troops from provincial governors and local tributary chiefs, he actively recruited mercenaries from across the Islamic world. However, he was unwilling to delay striking at Vijayanagara until his forces were fully reinforced. He and his advisors believed it was imperative to act while the Empire was experiencing disorganization at the highest levels.

Ahmad meticulously defined the status and authority of the kingdom's high-ranking officials more than his predecessors. Each provincial governor held the rank of commander of 2000 horse, although the size of their provincial troops was not limited to this number. When Ahmad went to war, these forces were augmented by significant contingents from the prominent fief-holders. Following a display of strength towards his northern frontier, which repelled a force that had invaded the Deccan from Gujarat, Ahmad led a march with 40,000 horse to confront Vira Vijaya.

=== Preparations of the Vijayanagara ===
Feeling the weight of his isolation, Bukka III, the ruler of Vijayanagara, wisely recognized the need for assistance and dispatched messengers to Anapota Velama of Telangana for aid. In response, Anapota sent his forces, likely under the command of Linga, to support Vijayanagara, his southern neighbor. Vira Vijaya, aided by the Velamas of Telangana, commanded an army, comprising nearly a million infantry and gunners, to the southern bank of the Tungabhadra River. His intention was to block the passage of the Bahmanis.

== The campaign ==
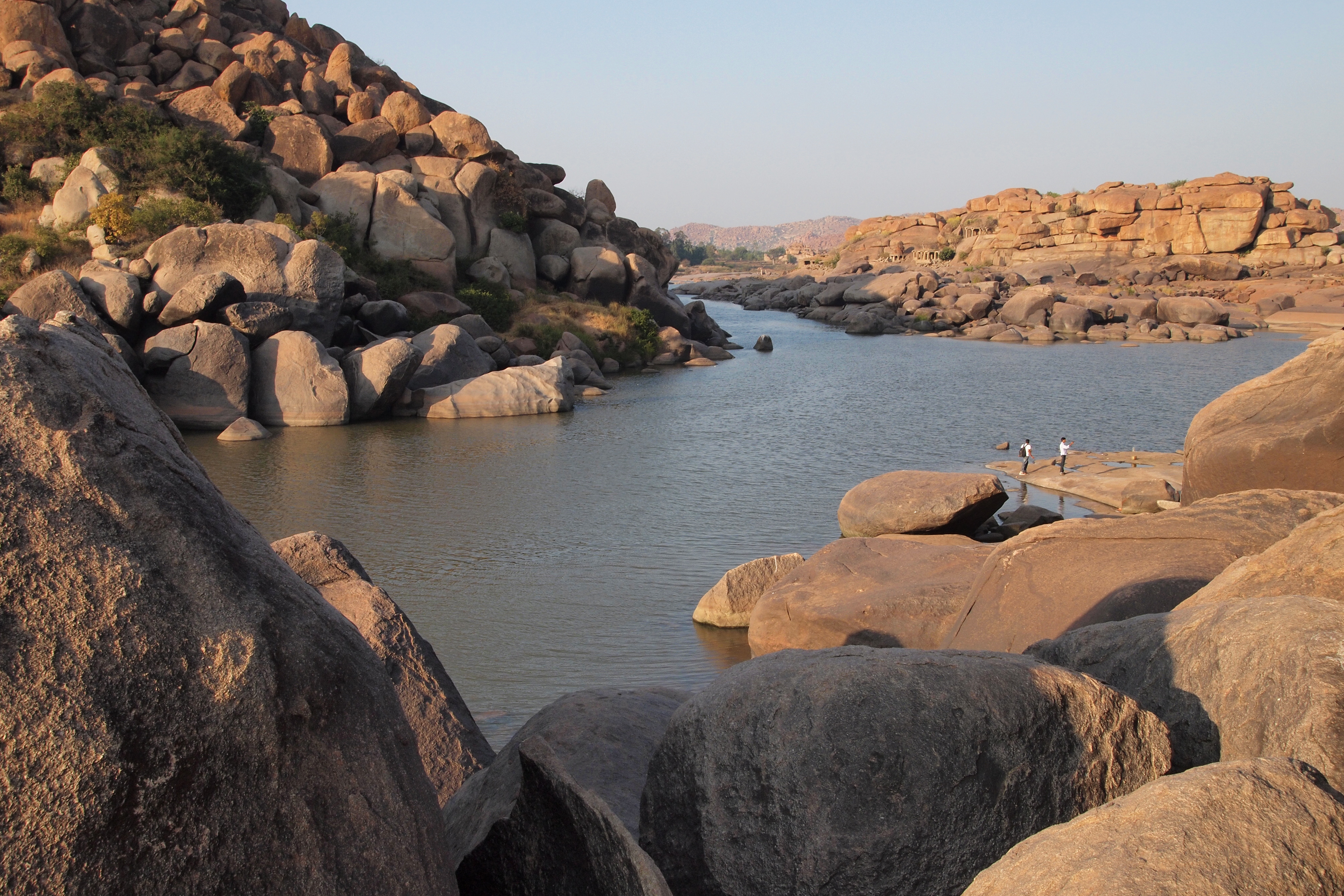
Tungabhadra river

Ahmad advanced to the northern bank of the river and, after forty days of unsuccessful attempts to entice the enemy into crossing, decided to take the offensive. During the night, a division of 10,000 men was dispatched upstream to cross the river above the enemy's camp. Their mission was to create a diversion by launching an attack on the enemy's left flank or rear. Ahmad anticipated a decisive engagement, but the Vijayanagara forces chose not to engage in battle and instead retreated to their own territories. The Vijayanagara ruler sought refuge in the sugarcane plantations. As the Bahmanis were harvesting the sugarcane for themselves and their horses, Vira Vijaya, fearing capture, stealthily slipped out and hid himself among the standing crop. Some of the Bahmani troops stumbled upon him, mistaking him for a gardener tasked with carrying the sugarcane. Unaware of his true identity as the Vijayanagara king, they took him into custody.

As the main Bahmani army commenced crossing the river, the leaderless Vijayanagara host, already under attack from the division that had captured their king, began to scatter in retreat. While the Bahmanis looted the camp, the Vijayanagara king managed to escape. However, feeling exhausted and demoralized, he opted not to attempt rallying his army and instead joined them in their flight back to Vijayanagara.

The Vijayanagaris now had cause to regret their violation of the humane treaty between Muhammad I and Bukka I, as never before in a long series of wars had either army exhibited the ferocity displayed by Ahmad's troops in this campaign. Although not naturally inclined towards cruelty, Ahmad's temper was inflamed by the atrocities committed by the Vijayanagara troops following the disastrous campaign of Pangul in 1420, and he sought to exact his revenge. Avoiding a siege of Vijayanagara, which was deemed an unprofitable endeavor, he led his forces through the kingdom, massacring men and enslaving women and children. An account of the massacre was meticulously kept, and whenever the tally of victims reached 20,000, Ahmad would pause to commemorate the event. On one such occasion, while he was out hunting, a group of enemy soldiers ambushed him. His bodyguard bravely held their ground until reinforcements arrived, driving off the Vijayanagara troops. Impressed by the valiant defense put up by the foreign archers of his guard, Ahmad ordered the principal foreign officer in his service, known as Malik Tujjär, to raise a corps of three thousand of them. This decision would ultimately have a profound and enduring impact on the history of Muslims in the Deccan.

Throughout his campaign, Ahmad engaged in the destruction of temples and the slaughter of cows, aiming to inflict maximum harm on the natural affections, patriotism, and religious sentiments of the Vijayanagaris. In March 1423, he paused by an artificial lake to observe the festival of the Nauruz and celebrate his own exploits. During a hunting excursion, he pursued an antelope relentlessly, leading him twelve miles from his camp where he encountered a body of five or six thousand enemy horsemen. In the ensuing fierce attack, half of his immediate bodyguard of 400 men were killed, but Ahmad managed to find refuge in a cattle-fold. There, his 200 foreign archers held off the Vijayanagara attackers for some time, despite the partial destruction of the enclosure wall. However, aid arrived unexpectedly when a loyal officer, ‘Abd-ul-Qadir, led two or three thousand royal guards in search of Ahmad, and they swiftly engaged the Vijayanagara forces. The Vijayanagara troops initially stood their ground, but after inflicting casualties on their assailants, they eventually fled, leaving a thousand of their own dead on the battlefield. After this, Ahmad himself marched towards Vijayanagara, and the Vijayanagara King, seeing the sufferings of his people, sued for peace accepting the terms offered by Ahmad Shah.

== Aftermath ==
Ahmad dispatched a messenger to the Vijayanagara King, stipulating that one of the conditions for peace would be the delivery of all arrears of tribute, loaded onto the backs of elephants from the Vijayanagara stables. This procession was to be led by the Crown Prince of Vijayanagara himself, with bands playing in front. The Raya promptly complied, and when the procession reached the Sultan's camp, it was received with great pomp by the Bahmani nobles and escorted to the king's presence. The king then adorned the Crown Prince of Vijayanagara with royal robes and a bejeweled dagger, and bestowed upon him Arab and Turkish horses, elephants, greyhounds, and three falcons. After these ceremonial gestures, the king escorted the Crown Prince back towards the Krishna River, bidding him farewell. Vira Vijaya then returned the Doab and other territories had taken from the Bahmani Sultanate in the war of 1420.

== Sources ==
- Majumdar, Ramesh Chandra (1949). An Advanced History of India: The Delhi sultanate and the Mughul empire. Macmillan.
- Watson, Adam (1964). The War of the Goldsmith's Daughter. Chatto & Windus.
- Haig, W (1928). The Cambridge History of India: Turks and Afghans, edited by W. Haig. University Press.
- Allan, John (1964). The Cambridge Shorter History of India. S. Chand.
- Sherwani, Haroon Khan (1985). The Bahmanis of the Deccan. Munshiram Manoharlal.
- Sarma, P. Sree Rama (1992). A History of Vijayanagar Empire. Prabhakar Publications.
- Nizami, Khāliq Aḥmad (1982). A Comprehensive History of India: The Delhi Sultanat, A.D. 1206-1526. People's Publishing House.
