= Pangala =

- village
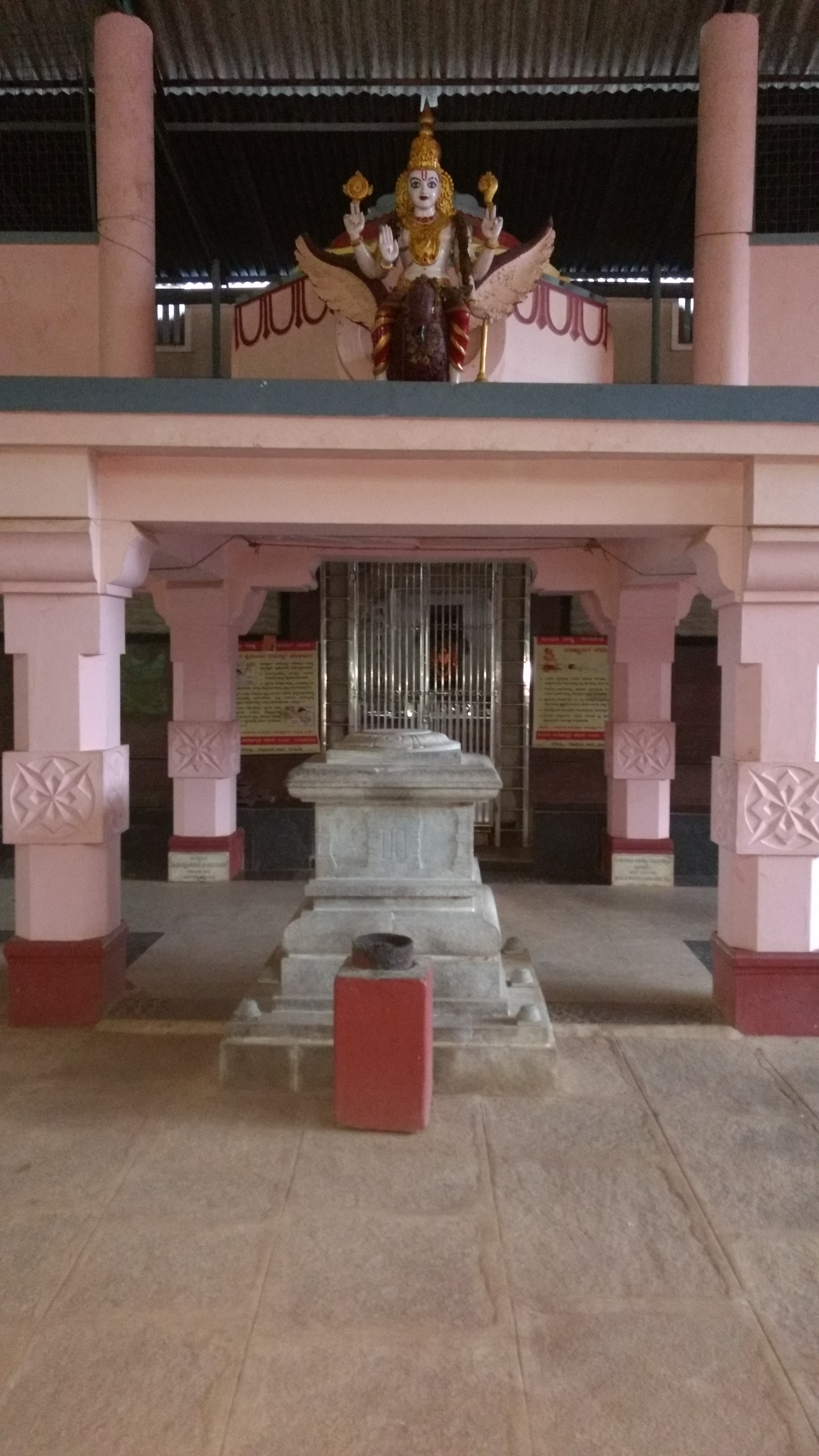
- Adi Janrdana Temple in Pangala

- Location in Karnataka, India Pangala (India)
- Coordinates: 13°15′0″N 74°45′0″E
- Country: India
- State: Karnataka
- District: Udupi

Population (2001)
  - Total: 1,948

Languages
  - Official: Kannada
- Time zone: UTC+5:30 (IST)

Pangala is a village situated in Udupi taluk of Udupi district, Karnataka. India's National Highway number 66 (NH 66) connecting Mangalore (Kudla or Mangaluru) to Mumbai (Bombay) passes through this village. The village is on the north banks of Pangala river. The Pangala river joins Arabian Sea near Mattu. The Shankarapura village which is famous for its jasmine flowers is nearby. The Janardhan temple of Pangala village has been renovated. One of the branches of Vijaya Bank is located in this village. According to the Indian Census of 2001, Pangala has a population of 1,948 (including 903 males, 1,045 females) in 438 households. Pangala Utsava is celebrated every year. Postal code for Pangala Post is 576122.

Pangala belongs to Kapu assembly constituency and Udupi Chikmagalur parliamentary constituency. The BICO is located in Pangala.

== Religious institutes ==
- Hazrath Arabi Valiyullah Kaipunjal
- Brahmalingeshwara Devastana Allade
- Dandathirtha
- Kothwala Guttu Naga Bana
- Pangala Alade Temple

== Transportation ==
Innanje railway station is the nearest railway to Pangala village. Padubidri Rail Way Station and Udupi Railway Station are the next railway stations to Pangala ( Innanje).

Udupi and Kapu are the nearest towns to Udupi having road connectivity to Udupi and Pangala.
