= Katapady =

Katapadi [Bandhanapura]
- Village
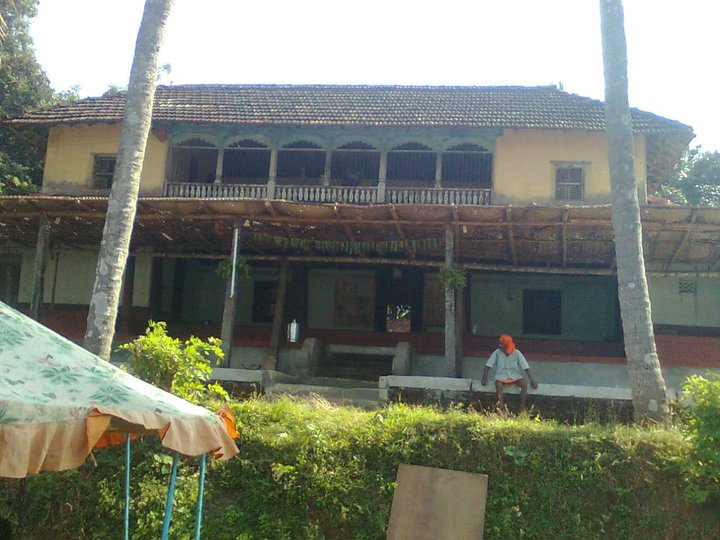
- Katapady Beedu
- Interactive map of Katapadi [Bandhanapura]
- Coordinates: 13.31448°N 74.78597°E
- Country: India
- State: Karnataka
- District: Udupi

Government
  - Body: Grama Panchayat

Languages
- Time zone: UTC+5:30 (IST)
- PIN: 574105
- Telephone code: 0820-557
- Vehicle registration: KA-20
- Nearest city: Udupi
- Literacy: Approx 99%
- Lok Sabha constituency: Udupi-Chikmagalur
- Vidhan Sabha constituency: Kaup
- Civic agency: Grama Panchayat
- Climate: Humid (Köppen)

Katapadi[ Originally called as Bandhanapura ] is a village near Udupi in Karnataka, India. It is situated at the junction of National Highway 66 and the roads leading to Mattu and Shankarapura. Katapadi is surrounded by lush green fields, rivers and a beautiful beach. Katapadi is well known for Mattu Gulla (a type of eggplant), Kambala and jasmine (mallige in Tulu). The name Katapadi is derived from "Kattu paadi" which means "tie it down" in Tulu. Apparently the place is named Katapadi after a lost horse which was found and tied down here.

== Transportation ==
National Highway NH-66 passes through Katapadi. Udupi is 7 km from Katapadi.

== Nearby places ==
- Udupi, Well known temple city of Southern India. Also known for its Udupi cuisine and restaurants.
- Pajaka Kshetra, Madhwaacharya's birthplace is about 5 kilometers from Katapadi.
- Kaup, known for its lighthouse and beach.
- Mattu, known for its beach,
- Manipal, a university town.
