= Shankarapura =

Shankarapura Pangla
- Village
- Jasmine Garden

- Location in Karnataka, India Shankarapura (India)
- Coordinates: 13°15′36″N 74°46′12″E
- Country: India
- State: Karnataka
- District: Udupi

Government
  - Body: Grama panchayath
- Time zone: UTC+5:30 (IST)
- PIN: 574115
- Nearest city: Udupi
- Lok Sabha constituency: Udupi-Chikmagalur
- Civic agency: Grama panchayath

Shankarapura a tiny hamlet in Udupi taluk, Karnataka state, India. Situated 3 km east of NH 17 (now NH 66). Shankerpura lies between the towns of Katapadi and Shirva. It can be reached via Katpadi-Shirva road on NH 66 at Katapadi from west and Karkala / Belmann / Shirva road from the east. It is about 10 km to the south of temple town Udupi, and 52 km north of the major port city of Mangalore.

People of this region speak Tulu, Kannada, Konkani, Byari, English and Dakhini Urdu languages

== Education ==
There are several institutions which provide quality education to the children of this region and also out station children.

- St. John's Higher Primary school (Kannada medium)
- St. John's High School (Kannada medium)
- St. John's Academy (English medium)
- St. John's Composite Pre-University College
- Shri Madhwa Vadiraja Institute of Technology & Management

== See also ==
- Shirva
- Pangala
