= Mattu, Karnataka =

Mattu Matti
- Village
- Location in Karnataka, India
- Coordinates: 13°15′33″N 74°44′16″E
- Country: India
- State: Karnataka
- District: Udupi

Government
  - Body: Gram panchayat

Population
  - Total: 6,000+

Languages
  - Official: Kannada
- Time zone: UTC+5:30 (IST)
- Nearest city: udupi
- Literacy: 29-39%%
- Lok Sabha constituency: kapu

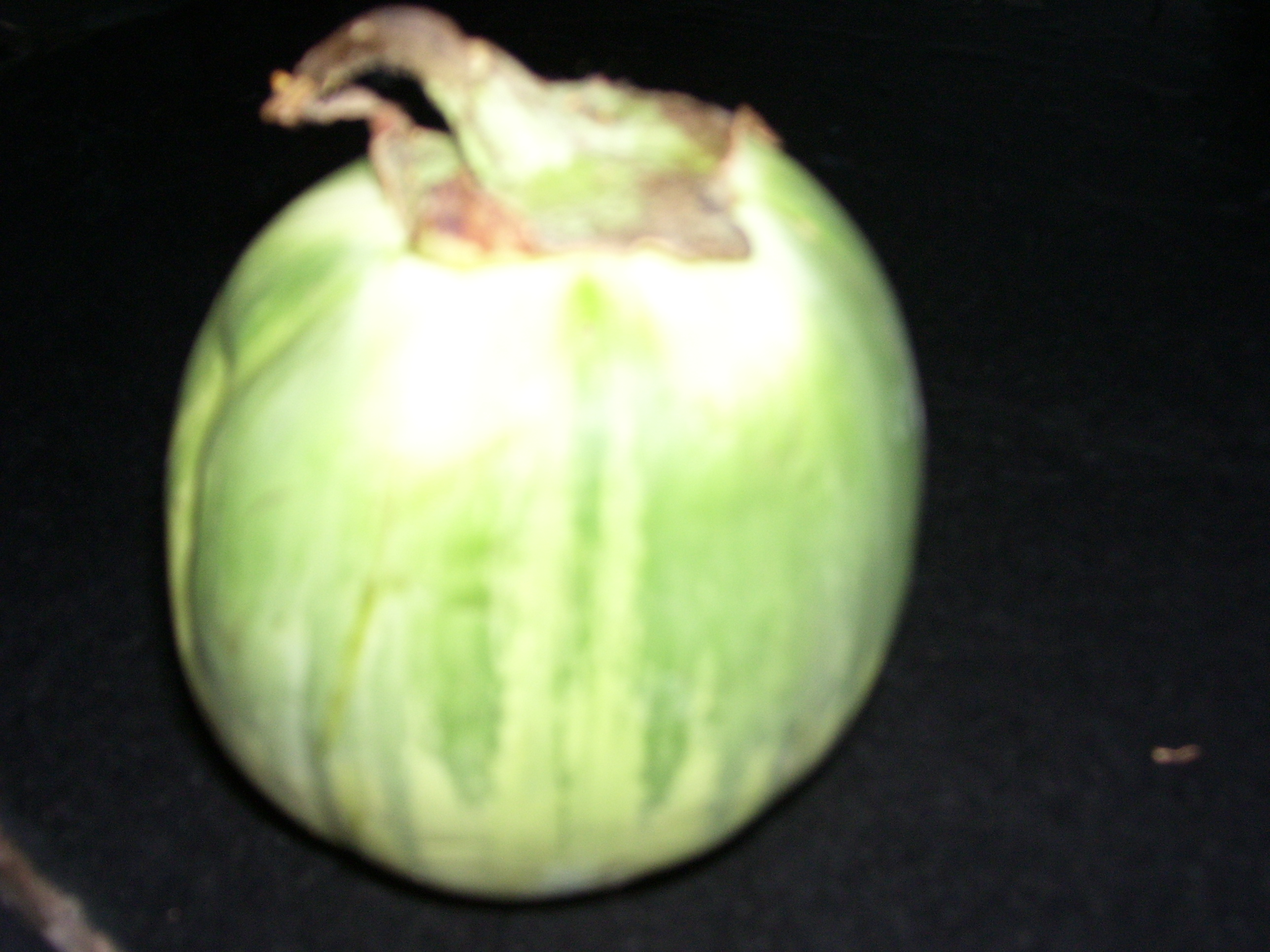
Matti Gulla

Mattu or Matti is a village in the Udupi district of Karnataka state in India that lies on the shore of the Arabian Sea. This village can be reached from the city of Udupi by taking a right turn at Katapady on the way to Mangalore.

The village is famous for a particular variety of brinjal (eggplant) that is grown only in this village called Mattu gulla. The brinjal grown here is light green in colour and is spherical, unlike the usual purple-coloured variety. The first brinjal harvested is offered to Lord Krishna at Krishna Matha, Udupi. The seeds for growing this type of brinjal is said to be given by Shri Vadiraja swamiji.

This village is also famous for a bridge named as Annekatta which connects this tiny village to Katapady. On one side of this bridge lies Mattu village while on other side lies a bus stop because bus is the only public transport available for the people of this village other than auto rickshaw. This village lies in the midst of Arabian Sea in the west and a small river in the east side.

== Demographics ==
Mattu village is spread over an area of 243.62 hectares and has 547 households residing in it, as of the 2011 census. It has a total population of 2,506 persons and 179 children under the age of 6 years as of 2011. As per the 2011 census, the sex ratio is higher for women as there are 1,241 males and 1,268 females. there is a glowing beach in mattu.

2,163 persons are literate here, out of which 1,100 are men and 1,063 women. 157 persons from Scheduled Castes and 1 person from a Scheduled Tribe resides here.
