= Daud Shah, Bannu =

Daud Shah
- Union council and town
- Country: Pakistan
- Region: Khyber Pakhtunkhwa
- District: Bannu District
- Time zone: UTC+5 (PST)

Daud Shah is a village and union council (an administrative subdivision) of Bannu District in Khyber Pakhtunkhwa province of Pakistan. Daud Shah contains an ITC (training) centre to empower women.
