= Srisailamgudem Devasthanam =

- Village
- Interactive map of Srisailamgudem Devasthanam
- Location in Andhra Pradesh, India
- Coordinates: 16.0833°N 78.8667°E
- Country: India
- State: Andhra Pradesh
- District: Nandyal

Area
  - Total: 21.69 km^{2} (8.37 sq mi)

Population (2011)
  - Total: 10,288
  - Density: 474.3/km^{2} (1,228/sq mi)

Languages
  - Official: Telugu
- Time zone: UTC+5:30 (IST)
- Vehicle registration: AP

Srisailamgudem Devasthanam is a village in Nandyal district in the Indian state of Andhra Pradesh.

== Demographics ==
As of 2001 India census, Srisailamgudem Devasthanam had a population of 6,854. Males constitute 52% of the population and females 48%. Srisailamgudem Devasthanam has an average literacy rate of 54%, lower than the national average of 59.5%: male literacy is 65%, and female literacy is 42%. In Srisailamgudem Devasthanam, 14% of the population is under 6 years of age.
