= Recherla Nayakas =

14th-century Andhra dynasty in the Telangana region, India

Recherla Nayakas (not to be confused with Recherla Reddis) also known as Padmanayaka Velamas were a Telangana-Andhra dynasty that wrested power from the Musunuri Nayakas and became the dominant power in the Telangana region during the late 14th century and early 15th century (r. 1375–1435). They were based at Rachakonda, southeast of Golconda, the border with the Bahmani sultanate during this period, and built a second base at Devarakonda.

== History ==
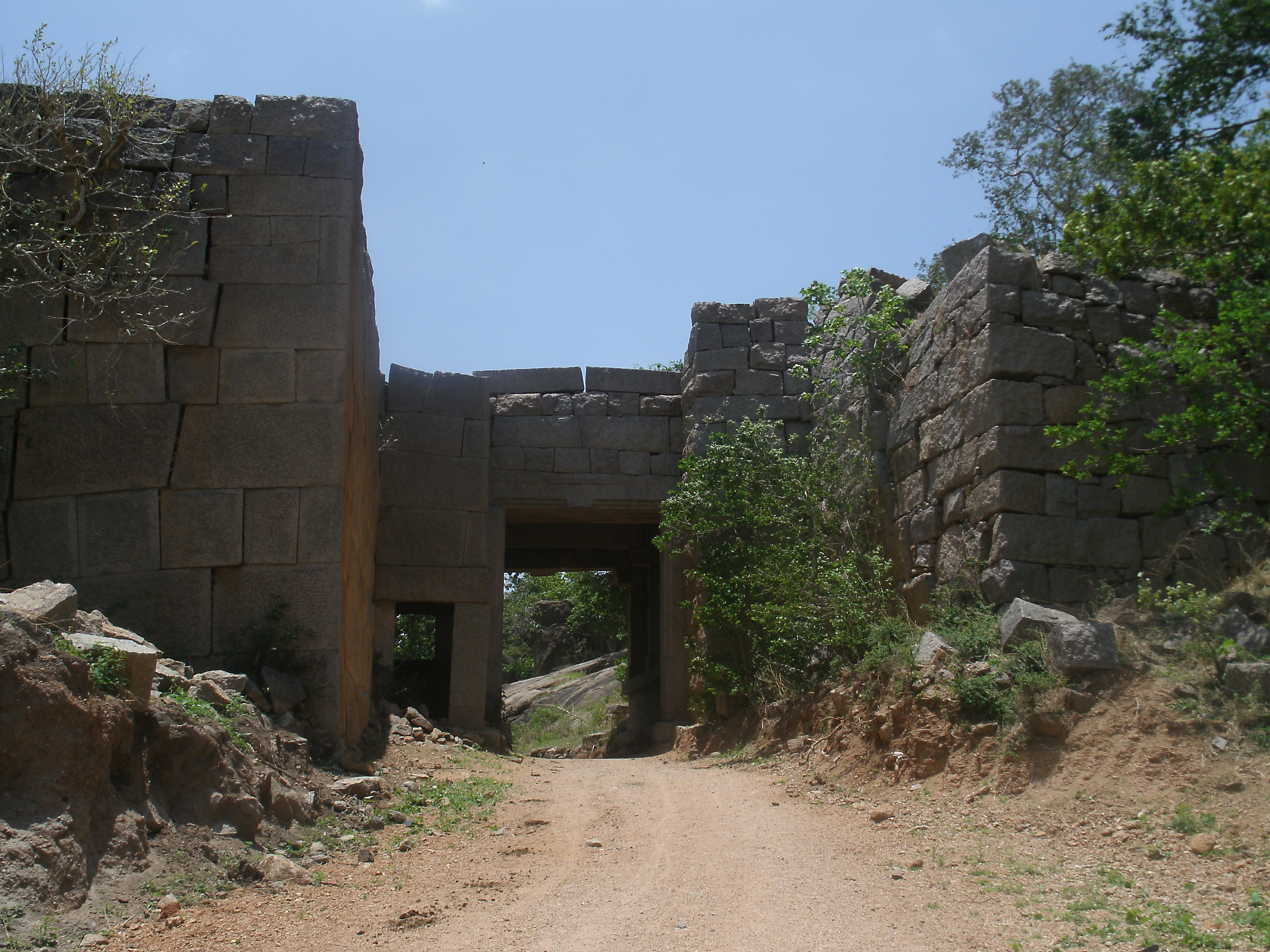
The Recherla Nayakas built the Rachakonda fort

Even though modern historians of Andhra identify the Recherla Nayakas with Velamas, Cynthia Talbot states that the formation of the Velama community dates to a later period, the mid-sixteenth century at the earliest.

The Recherla Nayakas are believed to have established their first base at Amanugallu. Driven by ambition and avarice, Recherla Nayaks (Anapota and Maada Nayaka) joined hands with Bahmani Sultan and marched on Warangal. In a battle fought at Bhimavaram in 1368, Kapaya Nayaka was killed and the Recherlas got control of Telangana. Anapota Nayaka later claimed, in an inscription issued in 1369, that his grandfather, Dachaya, had served as a chief under the Kakatiyas and that Prataparudra II conferred on him the title Pandya-raja-gaja-kesari (a lion against the Pandya elephants). The titles related to the defeat of Pandyas was after a battle at Kanchipuram against Pandyas where Recherla Nayakas defeated five royals of the Pandya empire. Two other titles held by 'Dacha Nayaka' related to this event are Kañci Kavāṭa Chuṟakāra and Pañca Pānḍya Daḷavibhāḷa (i.e. destroyer of armies of five Pandyas, namely, Vira Pandya, Vikrama Pandya, Parakrama Pandya, Sundara Pandya, and Kulasekhara Pandya). The Recherla Nayakas built two fortified towns at Rachakonda and Devarakonda in the Nalgonda district.

The Recherlas had as their rivals the Reddy dynasty in the coastal Andhra region. They were initially allied with the Bahmani sultanate, following the same terms of agreement as reached by the Musunuri Nayakas in 1364, whereas the Reddys were allied to the Vijayanagara Empire. Following a split among the Reddy clan, into Rajahmundry Reddys and Kondavidu Reddys, the Kondavidu Reddys switched their allegiance to the Bahmanis and the Recherlas aligned themselves with the Vijayanagara. A major battle ensued at Pangal Fort (near Wanaparthi) in 1419 in which the coalition of the Vijayanagara, Recherlas and Rajahmundry Reddys was victorious. However, the change of allegiance by Recherlas led to attacks by the Bahmani sultanate in the 1420s, who captured Warangal as well as Rachakonda by 1435. Thereafter, the Recherla chiefs remained small players scattered throughout Telangana.
