= Mujahid Shah =

Sultan of the Bahmani Sultanate from 1375 to 1378

Ala-ud-Din Mujahid Shah Bahmani
- Ala-ud-Din Mujahid Shah Bahmani

3rd Bahmani Sultan
- Monarch: 21 April 1375 – 16 April 1378
- Predecessor: Mohammed Shah I
- Successor: Daud Shah Bahmani
- Born: 1355–1356
- Died: 16 April 1378 (age 22-23)
- House: House of Ala-ud-Din Hasan Bahman Shah
- Dynasty: Bahmani Dynasty

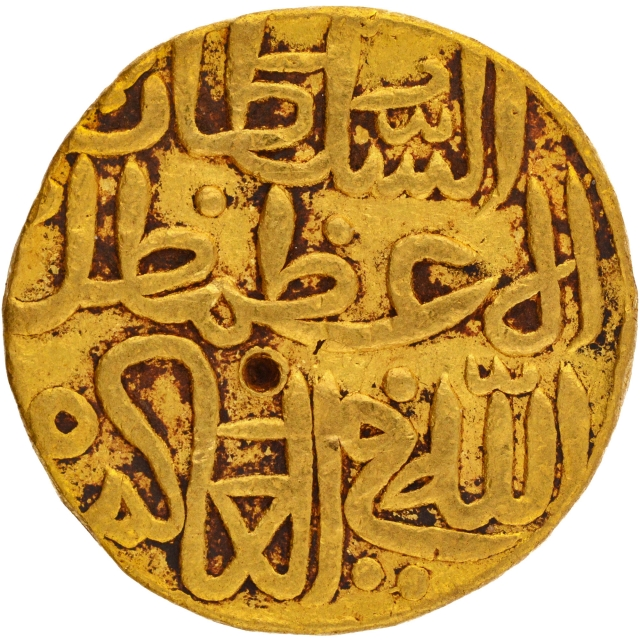
Coin issued during the rule of Mujahid Shah

Mujahid Shah Bahmani was the third ruler of the Bahmani Sultanate. He was the son of Mohammed Shah I. Unlike his predecessors, Mujahid only had a reign of three years because he was assassinated by his cousin, Daud Shah Bahmani.

== Reign ==
When Mujahid got the throne he got support from the Qadri Saint Sirajuddin Junaidi. The Saint sent his own shirt and turban to Mujahid, which he wore it on during special occasions. He was taught the art of war and was fluent in the Persian and Turki languages. He was proficient in archery and was a good swordsman. He was also affectionately called as Balwant or the 'strong or able-bodied one'. While he was crown prince, he broke the collar bone of Mubarak Shah the Royal Betel Leaf Bearer during a wrestling bout and killed him as revenge for informing his father muhammad shah for stealing coins from royal treasury. While campaigning in Vijayanagar, he went to hunt a ferocious tiger in the vicinity of his camp with his select followers. Once he got near to the tiger, he pierced its heart with his arrow. Later on he exaggerated that had his arrow missed the mark, he would have killed the tiger with his own dagger.

== War with Vijayanagar ==
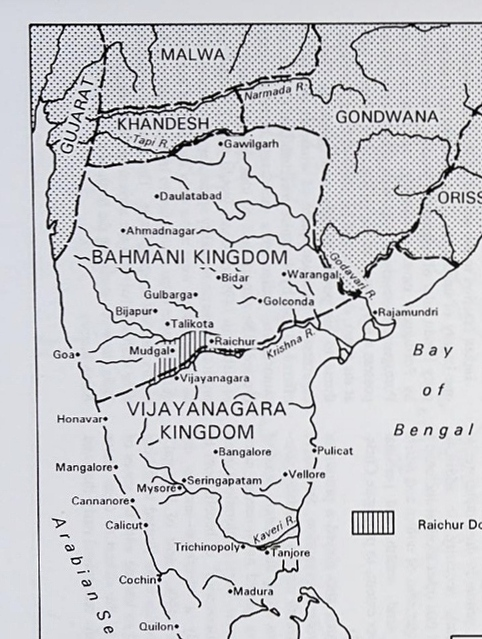
Map showing Raichur Doab

Practically the whole of Mujahid's reign was concentrated on the campaign to Vijayanagar. The Raichur Doab had always been the contention between the two sides. Mujahid proposed to the King of Vijayanagara Bukka to cede the forts of Bankapur to him which the King found it ludicrous which made war inevitable. Mujahid decided to gain victory quickly by encircling the Kingdom's capital and ordered Safdar Khan Sistani to lay siege to the fort of Adoni. The King finding it untenable to oppose Mujahid's vast army left the capital and continued his struggle by waging a guerrilla war in the forest. For 6 months, Mujahid tried to give battle to the King but it was all in vain. Bukka's health deteriorated and this forced him to retreat back to his capital and he died. He was succeeded by his son, Harihara II. The campaign was described differently by Muslim Historians like Ferishta, Shirazi and Sayyid Ali.

According to Ferishta, Mujahid then penetrated up to Rameshwaram and renovated the mosque built by Alauddin Khilji, which had fallen into negligence over time but there are numerous problems with this narrative as other medieval Islamic historians do not mention such an event and as asserted by K S Lal and N Venkataramayya, there is no evidence that Malik Kafur, the general of Alauddin at that time, penetrated up to Rameshwaram to warrant construction of a mosque there.

Regardless of this setback, he nevertheless continued the battle. During the attack on the capital, Mujahid reached the great lake overlooking the citadel. He then attacked the hill fort of the citadel where there was a temple dedicated to Sri Ranga which was covered with gold and silver. It was then venerated by the local Hindus. It was plundered and its edifice was razed off as the King considered it a religious duty to establish Islam by the sword. He along with one follower, Mahmud Afghan, crossed the lake with his black horse where he narrowly escaped a murder attempt by a Vijayanagara soldier by stabbing and killing him with his own sword. The Bahmani army was on the verge of victory when the tides started changing as the king, along with his army, having 8000 cavalry and many infantry joined the fray. The Sultanate army was overwhelmed by the attack with their general Muqarrab Khan being killed. The situation could have been more precarious had not the King's cousin, Daud Khan, performed a rearguard action with his 7000 infantry but he soon left the position unchecked for which Mujahid reprimanded him for, this made Mujahid realise that attacking the capital was futile and retreated towards the fort of Adoni.

The fort of Adoni at the time was laid to siege for 9 months and was on the near point of capitulation due to lack of water, but then heavy rains relieved the forces and they refused to capitulate and the situation became better with the arrival of Chennapa Odeyar's reinforcements. The fort defied the peace treaty and actually killed one of the Sultan's deputy's and fired his head into the Sultanate army camp. Eventually, Chennapa Odeyar pushed the Sultanate forces out and relieved the fort. According to the Kunigal inscription dated 1380 AD, Chennapa Odeyar wrested 'from the hands of the Yavanas the territory they had seized, presented it as tribute to King Harihara' The hope of victory was soon lost and the Sultanate army began to suffer from disease and famine. Mujahid had no choice but to retreat and cross the Tungabhadra river. The whole expedition was disbanded and the generals were sent back to their own provinces to govern.

== Assassination ==
On 17 April 1378, the King reached the fort of Mudgal and crossed the Krishna for a fishing expedition, then the stage was set for the worst. Masud Khan, the son of Mubarak The Royal Betel Leaf Bearer, whom Mujahid broke his collar bone when he was a crown prince and Daud Khan, whom the King reprimanded for his negligence towards his position during the military campaign, conspired to kill him and on that day they assassinated him in his tent and Daud himself ascended the throne after his death.

== See also ==
- Alauddin Bahman Shah

== Bibliography ==
- Sherwani, H K, ed. (1946). The Bahmanis of Deccan, An objective study. Saood Manzil Limited.
- King, J S, ed. (1900). The History of the Bahmani Dynasty. Luzac and Co.
- Briggs, John, ed. (1909). History of the Mohommedan powers in india till 1612, Vol 2.
