= Udupi taluk =

Udupi Taluk ಉಡುಪಿ ತಾಲೂಕು
- Taluk
- Udupi
- Coordinates: 13.3389°N 74.7451°E
- Country: India
- State: Karnataka
- Region: Tulunadu

Government
  - Type: City Municipal Council
  - Council President: Dinakar Shetty

Area
  - Total: 924.13 km^{2} (356.81 sq mi)
- Elevation: 39 m (128 ft)

Population (2011)
  - Total: 165,401
  - Density: 286/km^{2} (740/sq mi)

Languages
  - Official: Tulu, Kannada
- Time zone: UTC+5:30 (IST)
- PIN: 576101 (City)
- Telephone code: 0820
- Vehicle registration: KA-20

Udupi taluk is a taluk in the Udupi District of the Indian state of Karnataka. The headquarters is the town of Udupi.

According to the Indian Census of 2001, Udupi taluk has a population of 529,225 (251,021 males, 278,204 females) in 104,608 households, divided between an urban population of 152,646 and a rural population of 376,579. There are 99 villages identified as part of Udupi taluk.

== Towns and villages ==
- Udupi
- Pangala
