= Daud Shah Bahmani =

Sultan of the Bahmani Sultanate in 1378

- Daud Shah Bahmani I

4th Bahmani Sultan
- Monarch: 16 April – 21 May 1378
- Predecessor: Mujahid Shah
- Successor: Mohammad Shah II
- Died: 21 May 1378
- Issue: Taj ud-Din Firuz Shah; Ahmad Shah I Wali; Muhammad Sanjar
- House: House of Ala-ud-Din Hasan Bahman Shah
- Dynasty: Bahmani Dynasty

Daud Shah Bahmani (reigned 1378), also spelled as Dawud, was the fourth ruler of the Bahmani Kingdom. He succeeded his nephew Mujahid Shah after assassinating him. After ascending the throne, Daud Shah's brief reign was marked with turbulence and instability over his regicide of his nephew, which culminated in the creation of court factions.

Daud Shah distinguished himself in Mujahid Shah's campaigns against the Vijayanagara Empire, but was later reprimanded by Mujahid for his actions during the battle. Discontent, Daud Shah had Mujahid assassinated, and ascended the throne in 1378. Instability gripped Daud Shah's short reign, and eventually he was assassinated by a court faction led by Mujahid Shah's sister, who instead placed Alauddin Bahman Shah's younger son, Mohammad Shah II on the throne.

== Mujahid Shah's reign ==
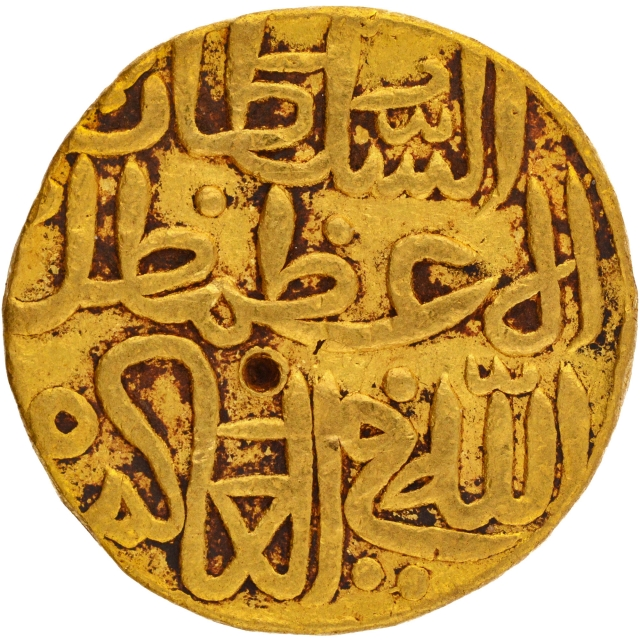
Coin of Mujahid Shah

During one battle of Mujahid Shah's campaign, Daud Shah was left in charge of guarding the installment of Dhuna Sodra with seven thousand cavalry in case the Muslim army had been defeated. After the battle began, Daud Shah abandoned his post and directly engaged in battle. During the battle, Daud Shah had over three horses killed under him, and despite their victory, Mujahid Shah was outraged that Daud Shah had entered the battle, and scolded him, for if the Muslims had been defeated, they wouldn't have been able to escape.

Returning from his campaign against the Vijayanagara Empire, Mujahid Shah led a hunting expedition with some 400 cavalry, while also being attended by Daud Shah, Musnad-I 'Ali Khan Muhammad, Azim Humayun and Safdar Khan. Unable to accept his reprimand, Daud Shah began hatching a conspiracy to assassinate Mujahid Shah, inviting Musnad-I 'Ali, who had his clavicle broken by Mujahid Shah in childhood. Eventually, Mujahid Shah dismissed Safdar Khan and Azim Humayun to return to their provinces, while he himself began marching back to the capital, arriving before a river and began fishing.

After having pain in his eyes, Mujahid Shah retired to his tent. On 16 April 1378, at midnight, Daud Shah and Musnad-I 'Ali entered Mujahid's tent, where they encountered Mujahid Shah asleep and only a slave in the room. The slave, startled after viewing Daud Shah with a dagger, immediately awoke Mujahid by shouting. Daud lunged at Mujahid, stabbing him, while Mujahid began struggling with Daud. The slave grabbed Musnad-I 'Ali, who struck him down with a sword, and then killed Mujahid Shah.

== Reign ==
Following the assassination of Mujahid Shah, Daud Shah was proclaimed the new King, becoming the fourth Bahmani Sultan, with nobles that were present submitting homage to him. However, the immediate aftermath of Mujahid Shah's assassination saw the Sultanate fall into a period of extreme instability, with nobles such as Safdar Khan and Azim Humayun after learning of the assassination, refusing to pay homage.

Nonetheless, Daud Shah continued to the capital of Gulbarga. During this period of instability, Harihara II, the ruler of the Vijayanagara Empire, invaded and took the opportunity to besiege Raichur. Daud Shah's court split into two factions, with one being loyal to Daud Shah, and the other faction wishing to replace him with Mohammad Shah II, the younger son of Alauddin Bahman Shah.

Ruh Parwar Agha, the brother of Mujahid Shah, sponsored the efforts to try and depose Daud Shah, and wielded significant influence over the Bahmani harem. Ruh Parwar used remorse to strengthen her own position at court, also extensively giving out gifts of money to others. Daud Shah's attempts to conciliate and mend ties with her failed especially as he attempted to consolidate power by having Saifuddin Ghori submit to him.

Eventually, Ruh Parwar hired a royal slave named Bakah to assassinate Daud Shah. In May 1378, either on the 20th, 21st, or 24th, while Daud Shah was attending jumah, Bakah attacked him while he was in prostration, who stabbed Daud Shah, with sources differing on whether Daud Shah was killed immediately, or grievously wounded, leading to his death not long after. Bakah was immediately killed by Musnad-I 'Ali, who then attempted to place Daud Shah's son, Muhammad Sanjar, on the throne. However, Ruh Parwar had Muhammad Sanjar blinded, and Mohammad Shah II succeeded to the throne.
