= Devarakonda =

- Town
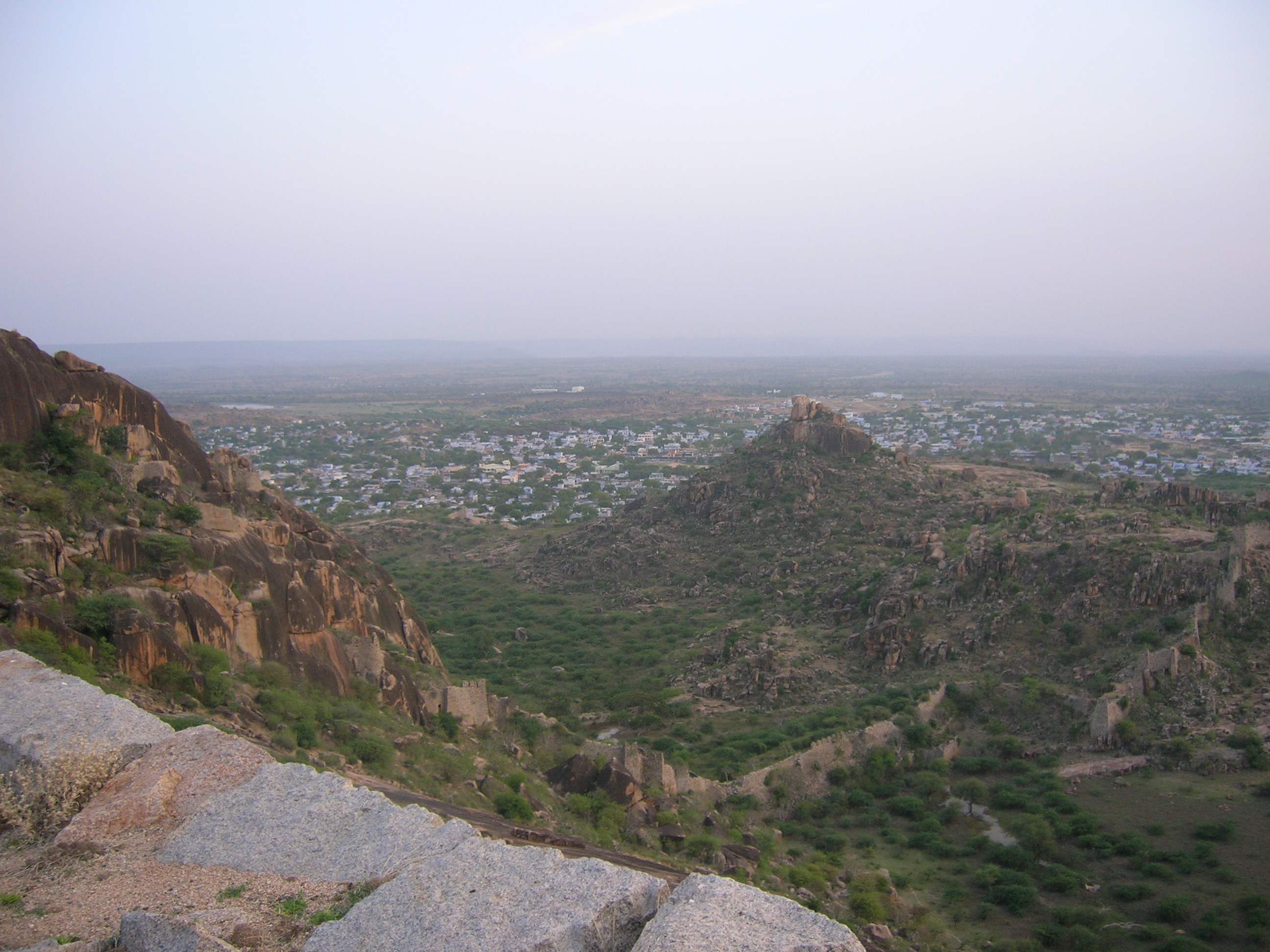
- A view of Devarakonda Fort

- Location in Telangana, India Devarakonda (India)
- Coordinates: 16.7000°N 78.9333°E
- Country: India
- State: Telangana
- District: Nalgonda

Area
  - Total: 28.18 km^{2} (10.88 sq mi)

Population (2011)
  - Total: 29,731
  - Density: 1,055/km^{2} (2,733/sq mi)

Languages
  - Official: Telugu
- Time zone: UTC+5:30 (IST)
- Postal code: 508248
- Vehicle registration: TG
- Website: telangana.gov.in

Devarakonda (Telugu: దేవరకోండ) is a town in the Nalgonda district of the Indian state of Telangana. It is a municipality in Devarakonda mandal of Devarakonda division. It is located about 60 kilometres (37 mi) from the district headquarters Nalgonda, 104 kilometres (65 mi) from the state capital Hyderabad.

== Demographics ==
According to the 2001 India census, Devarakonda has a population of 37,434. Males constitute 53% of the population and females 47%. Devarakonda has an average literacy rate of 72%, higher than the national average of 59.5%: male literacy is 81% and female literacy is 63%. In Devarakonda, 12% of the population is under 6 years of age.
