= Kampana's invasion of Madurai =

1365–1370 military campaign in southern India

- Part of Battles involving the Vijayanagara Empire
Date	1365–1370
Location	Madurai, Tamil Nadu, India 9.9252°N 78.1198°E
Result	Vijayanagara Empire victory
Territorial changes	Madurai Sultanate ceased to exist.

Belligerents
Vijayanagara Empire	Madurai Sultanate

Commanders and leaders
Kumara Kampana; Somappa Dandanayaka; Gopana; Suva Mangu	Qurbat Hasan †

Casualties and losses
Unknown	Heavy
- Madurai Battle field Location

Kumara Kampana, son of Bukka I of the Vijayanagara Empire, commanded a series of military campaigns that disestablished Muslim rule in southern India, annexing Madurai around 1370. His conquests restored social order, revived religious practices, and extended the Vijayanagara's dominion to the Southern Ocean. Kampana's conquests, such as the reconstruction of the Ranganatha temple and the liberation of Ma'bar, are enshrined in the Sanskrit epic Madhura Vijayam by his wife, Ganga Devi.

== Prelude ==
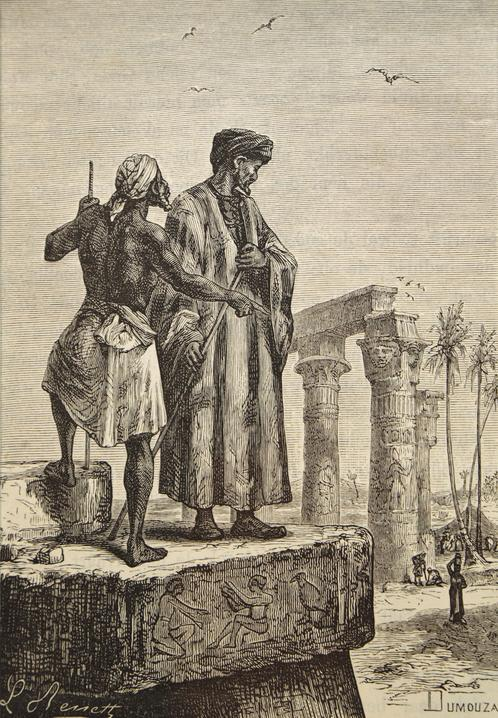
1878 illustration by Léon Benett showing Ibn Battuta (center) and his guide (left) in Egypt

Ibn Battuta, the Moorish traveler, was in Madurai in 1342 and documented the nascent history of the Madurai Sultanate. Jalaluddin Ahsan Khan, the founder of the Sultanate, died in 1339 after four years of reign. He was succeeded by Ala-ud-din Udaiji, who reigned for approximately a year before being assassinated. Udaiji's son-in-law, Qutb-ud-din, seized power for a short period but was assassinated after merely forty days. The throne was then occupied by Ghiyas-ud-din Dhamaghani (r. 1341–1343), during whose reign Ibn Battuta was in Madurai.

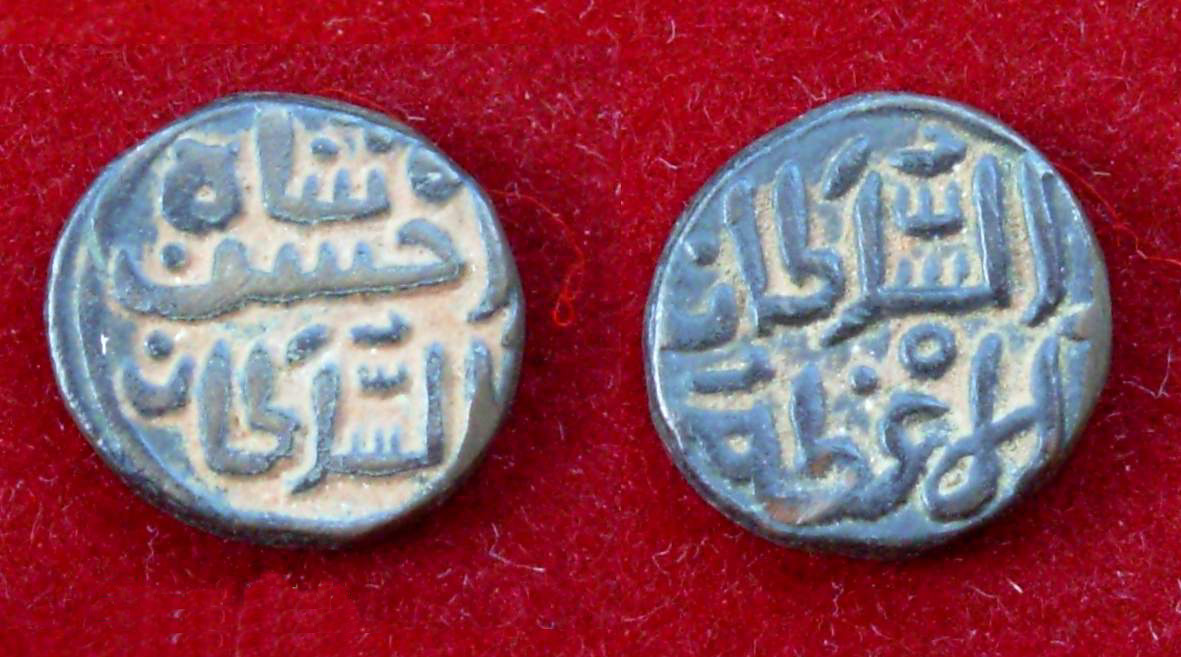
A coin of Jalaluddin Ahsan Khan, the first ruler of the Madurai Sultanate

In Ghiyas-ud-din's reign, the Hoysala king Veera Ballala III invaded, defeating the Sultanate forces in the battle of Kannanur and besieging Kobban fort for six months. Ghiyas-ud-din, however, made a surprise counterattack, capturing and killing Veera Ballala III in 1342. Ibn Battuta, who saw these happenings, remarked on the Sultan's tyrannical rule. An epidemic swept Madurai at this time, ultimately killing the Sultan. His nephew, Nasir-ud-din, succeeded to power in 1343–1344, just before Ibn Battuta departed the area.

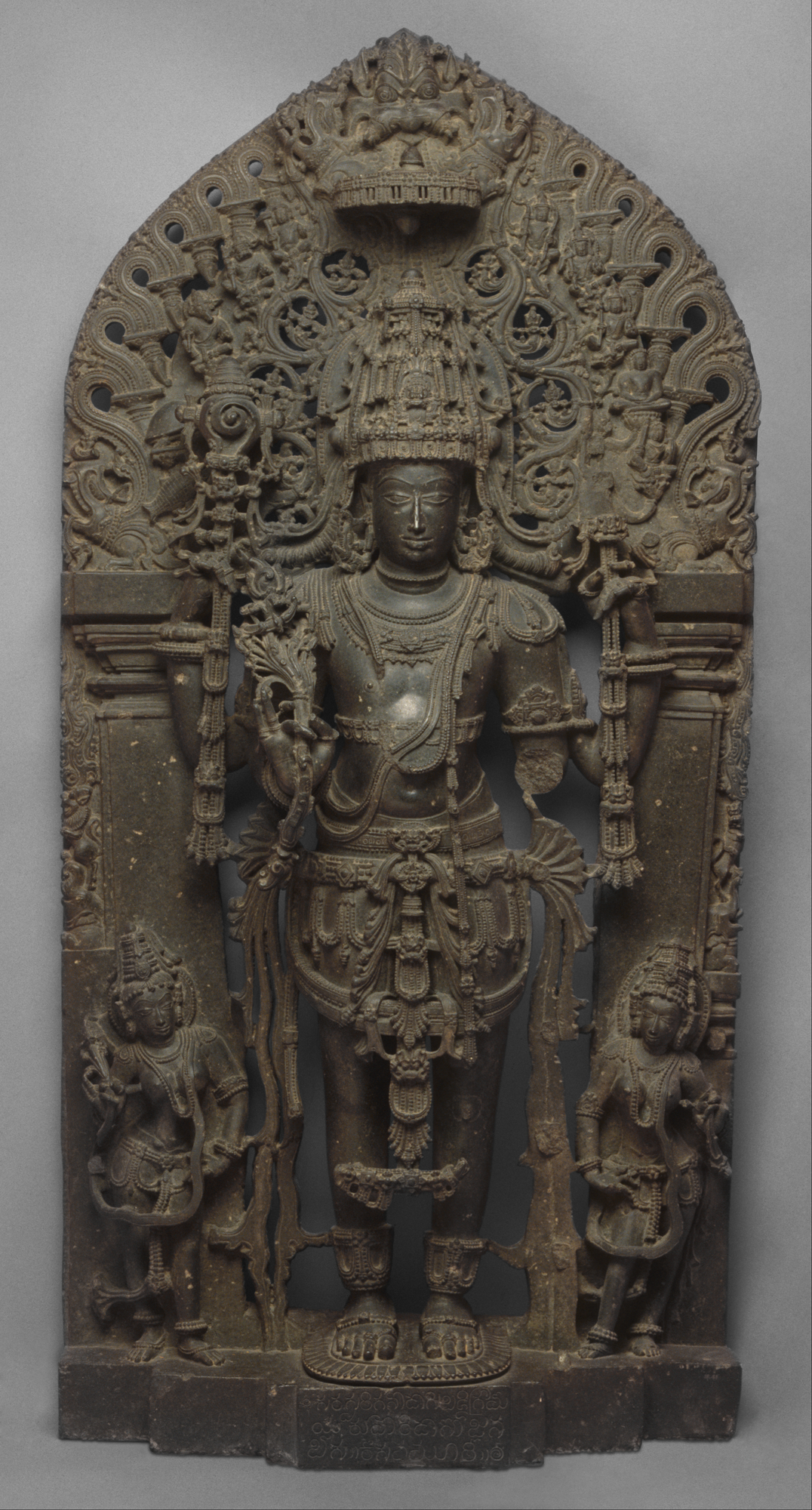
Standing Vishnu as Keshava, 1st quarter of the 12th century, Hoysala period, probably Belur, Karnataka, India

The later history of the Sultanate is poorly documented, and the interval of a break in coinage between 1343 and 1356 points to instability. Historian Afif states that during Sultan Feroz Shah's rule at Delhi, a firman dispatched to Ma'bar found the place rulerless. According to reports, the local people chose Qurbat Hasan Kangu as the king, but he was ineffective. Meanwhile, the founding of the Vijayanagara Empire in 1336 marked the beginning of resistance to Muslim rule in the Deccan and southern India, ultimately resulting in the downfall of the Madurai Sultanate.

== Background ==
During Bukka's rule, a typical milestone was the fall of the Madurai Sultanate at the hands of his son, Kumara Kampana. After making peace after the siege of Vijayanagara, Bukka followed his plans to conquer South India, motivated by a series of compelling reasons. The region, earlier under the Hoysala Kingdom, had fallen into anarchy due to internecine wars among native chiefs, threatening life and property. Also, the Madurai Sultanate was a thorn in the flesh of Hindu culture, and desecrated temples and destroyed religious centers called for a savior. Bukka wanted to fulfill Ballala's incomplete task of reconquest and restoration.

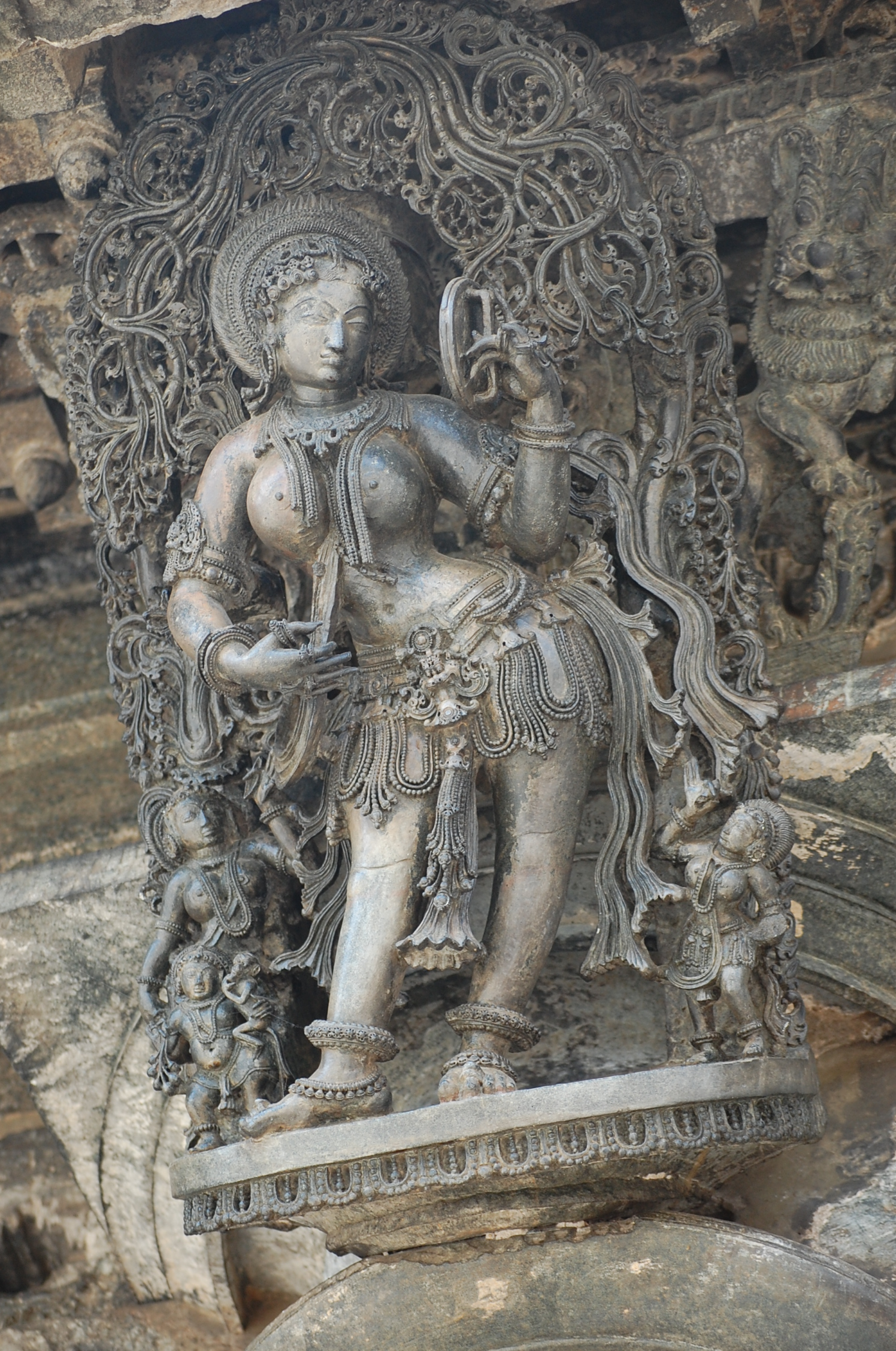
"Darpanasundari" (lady with a mirror), one of the many madanakai decorating the Chennakeshava Temple, Belur.

According to Bukka's orders, Kampana, the viceroy of the southern provinces, launched a series of military campaigns to establish Vijayanagara's dominance. With the help of great generals like Gopana and Suva Mangu (who is said to be Mangappa Dandanatha, an ancestor of Saluva Narasinga), he conquered the Sambuvarayas of North and South Arcot first, making them loyal to the greater cause.

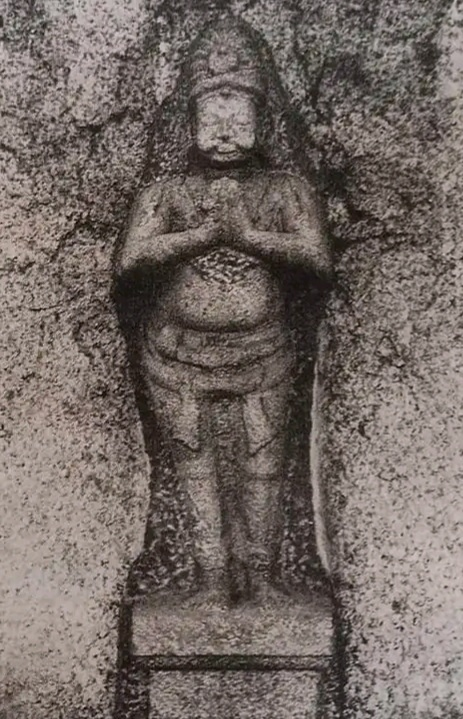
Raja Gambhira Sambhuvarayar I

Kampana then marched further into Tondamandala, which was controlled by Sambava Raya, or Champa Raya. He set up Virinchipuram as his headquarters and then besieged and occupied Sambava Raya's fortress after he won a duel. Following this victory, Kampana marched on Kanchi, where he granted magnificent benefactions to local temples and left a garrison to offer public security. He then marched further south to invade the Madurai Sultanate.

== Conquest of Madurai ==
Kumara Kampana, grandson of Bukka I, the second Vijayanagara king, orchestrated a sequence of victorious campaigns that resulted in the gradual erosion of Muslim dominance across southern India. His occupation of Rajagambhira Rajya, the kingdom of the Sambuvarayas, around 1362 was the beginning of his southward military campaigns. Following this victory, Kampana marched further south and restored the image of God Ranganatha to his temple at Srirangam, which had been taken away for safety during the Muslim invasions.

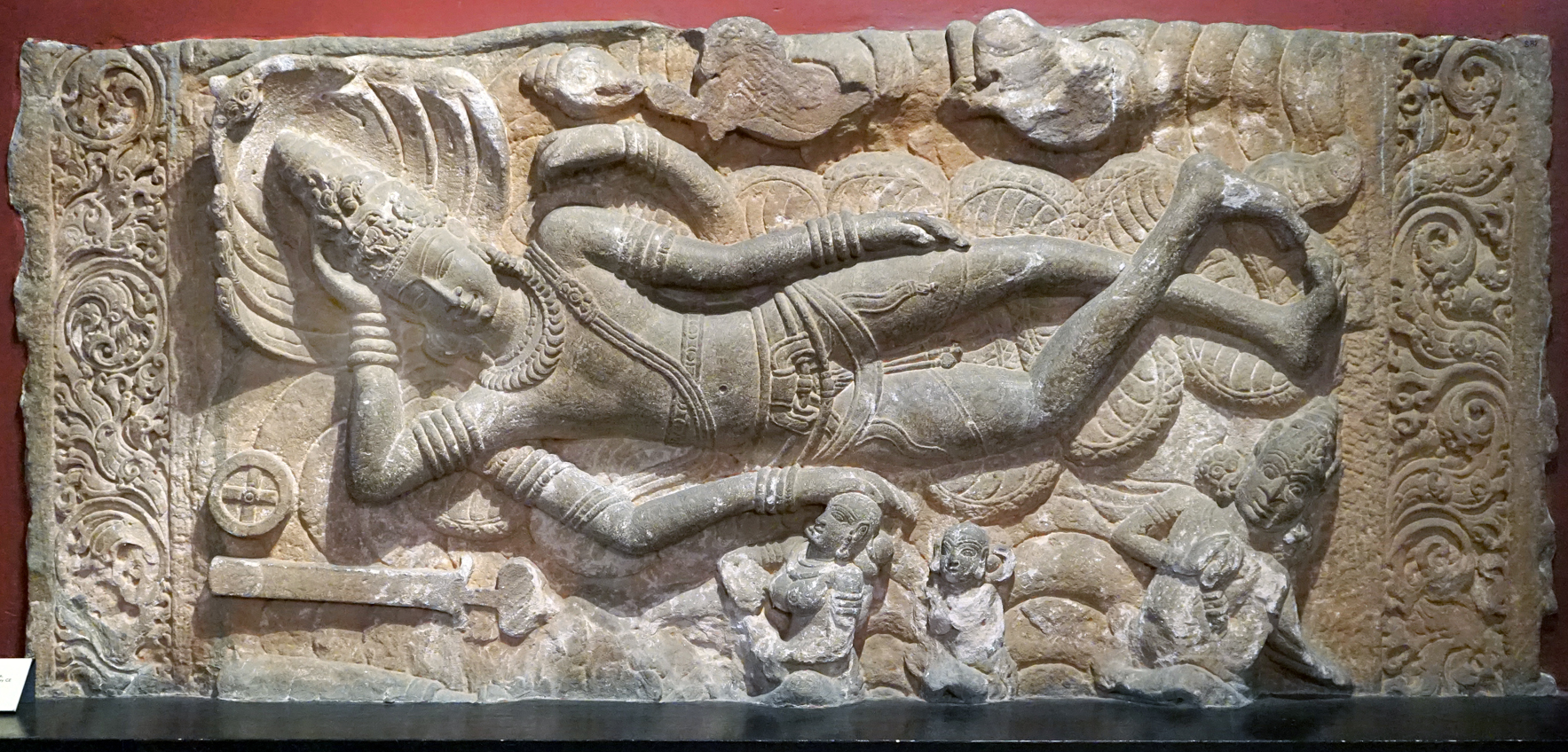
Sculpture of Vishnu as Ranganatha.

The peak of Kampana's military campaigns was his conquest of Madurai, where he defeated the Sultan decisively, effectively ending almost five decades of Muslim rule in the area. This military campaign not only expanded Vijayanagara's dominance across southern India but also brought peace, restored religious practices, and refurbished cultural institutions, thereby leaving an indelible mark in the region's historical record.

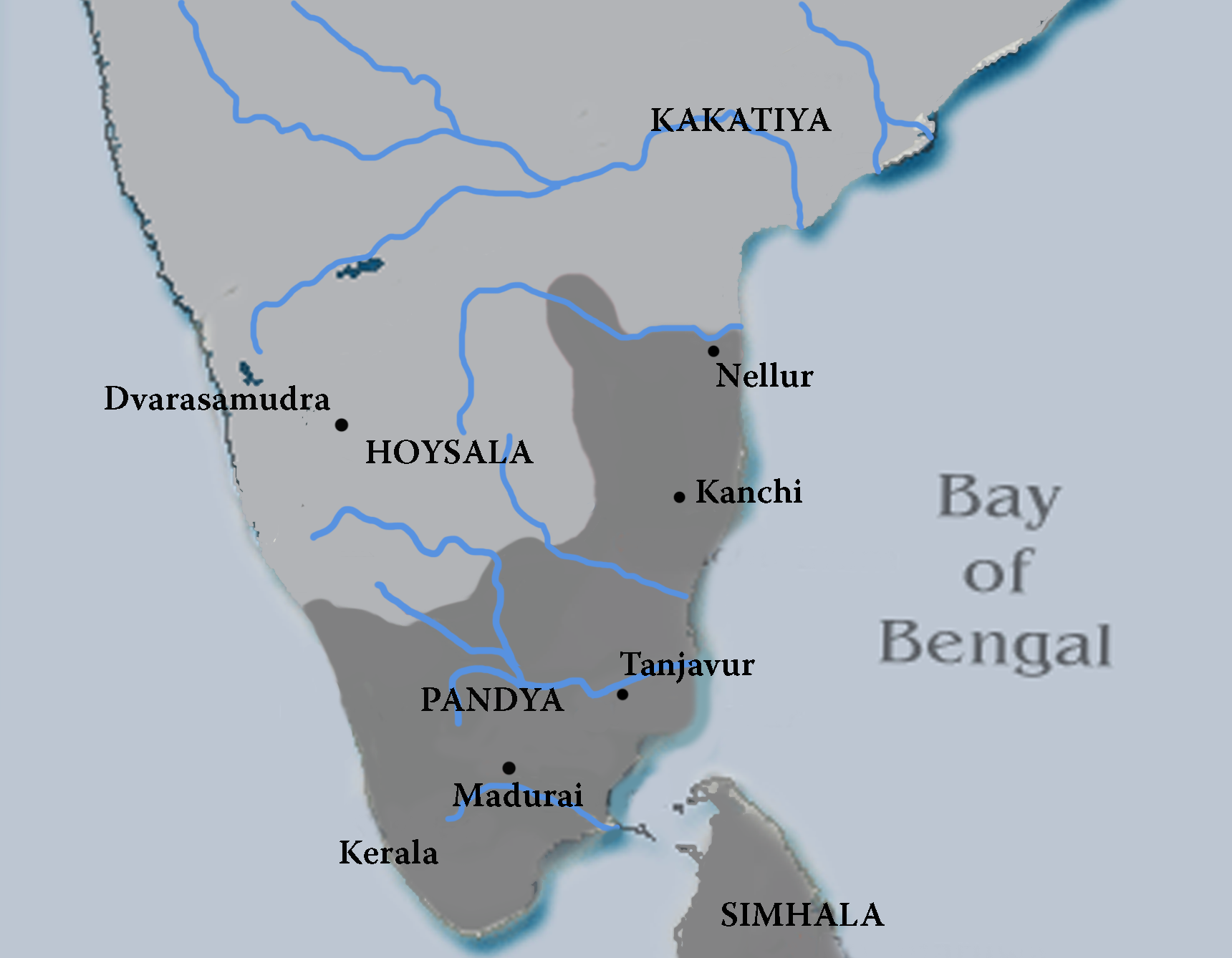
Pandyan Empire at greatest extent

The Sanskrit epic Madhura Vijayam, written by his wife Ganga Devi, recounts that Kampana was inspired by a divine vision in Kanchipuram. In this vision, the god who represented the Pandya land lamented the fate of the land under Muslim rule and gave him a sword that symbolized Pandyan rule. This event, which occurred between 1365 and 1370, marked the freedom of Ma'bar from Muslim rule.

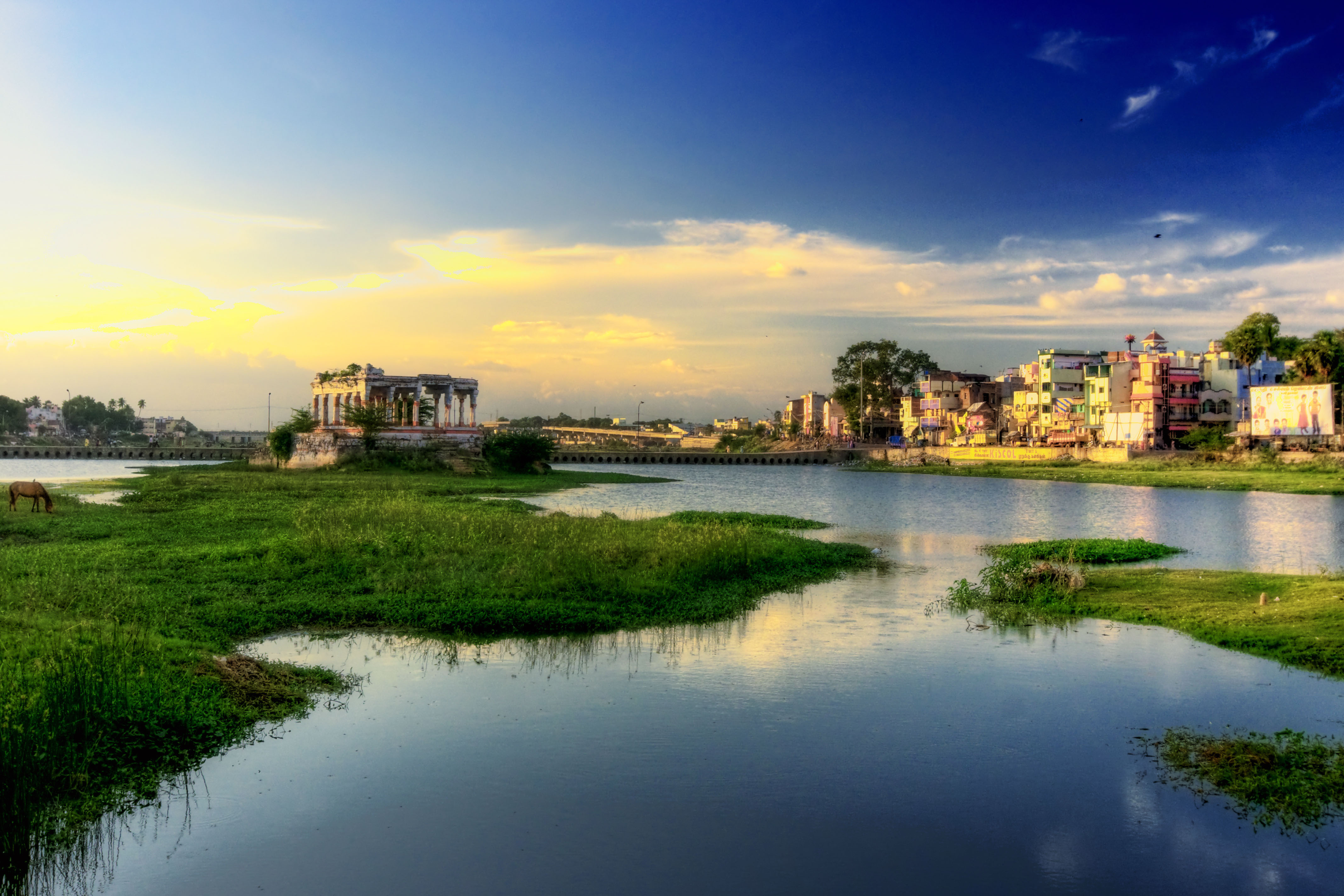
Vaigai River in Madurai

After the fall of Madurai, Kampana continued his march south to Ramnad and Rameswaram, where he restored temples and ensured their proper worship. By 1371, his military conquests had extended to the southern ocean. In spite of a failed appeal for help from the defeated Muslims to Delhi, Kampana consolidated the Vijayanagara hegemony over the region.

== Aftermath ==
During the next two years, Kampana devoted himself to the reorganization of the administration in the south, ensuring stability before returning to Mulbagal in 1373 to complete his military campaigns. His efforts not only ended Muslim rule in the south but also restored Hindu religious practices and consolidated Vijayanagara's power in the region. Kampana died in 1374, leaving a lasting legacy celebrated in the Madhura Vijayam.

The conquest of south India is one of the greatest achievements in the history of Vijayanagara Empire, elevating what had been a small principality to the status of an empire. Bukka I celebrated this great success by adopting the titles of "King of Kings" and "Lord of Three Seas." Besides, he sent an embassy to the Chinese Emperor, Tai-tsu, further consolidating the grandeur of his empire. The capital, Vidyanagara, was renamed Vijayanagara, or "City of Victory," as a memorial of Bukka's great conquests.

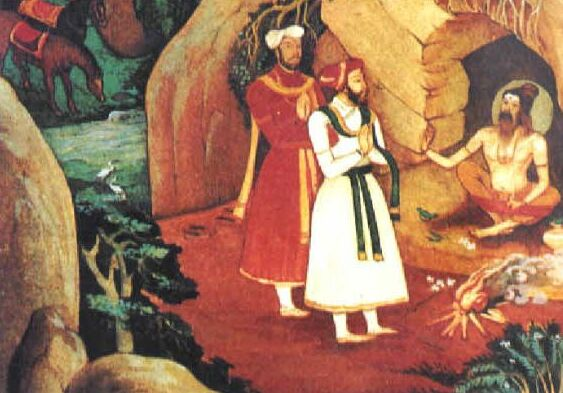
Modern depiction of Harihara and Bukka meeting Vidyaranya

Alongside the political advancements, the Vijayanagara Empire experienced a flourishing of religious and literary activity prospered at the capital. Under the patronage of King Bukka I and inspired by him, Vidyaranya made unprecedented efforts in reviving religious studies, religiously transcending. He attracted scholars from far and wide and provided them with endowments and facilities to write on various subjects like logic, grammar, astronomy, philosophy, and Vedic theology.

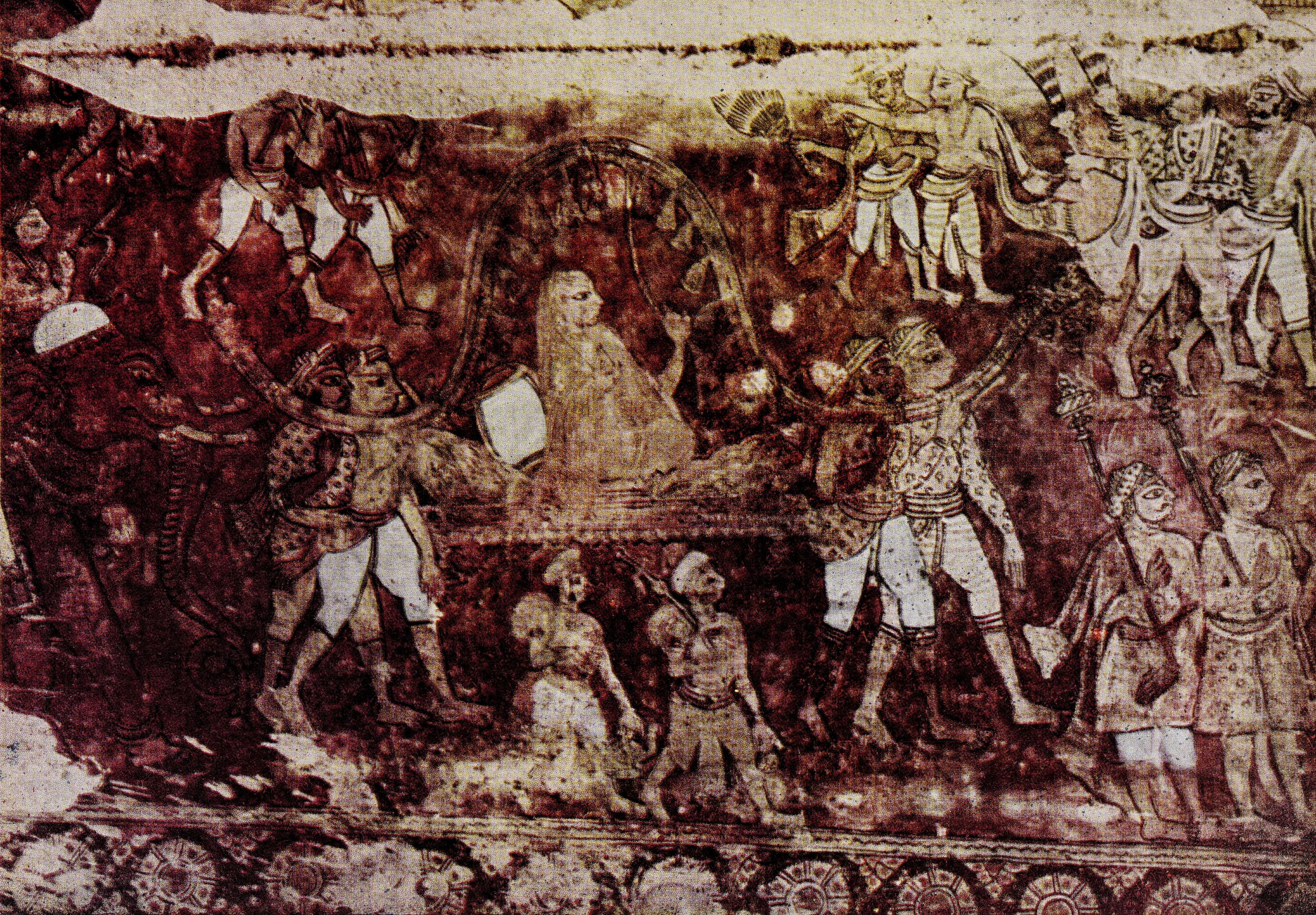
Procession of Vidyaranya c.15th Century.

The volume of learned work done under his patronage became renowned in all of India. Some of the important works of that period are Sarvadarsana Sangraha, Sankara Digvijaya, Parasara Madhaveeya, Manusmruti Vyākhyāna, Jaimineeya-Dhaluvritti, Vinarana Prameya, Vedanta Panchadashi, Desopanishad Deepika, Vyavahāra Mādhava and various stotras. Vidyaranya's brother, Sayanacharya, was equally great a scholar, contributing more than 113 works.

Some of his important works are Subhāshita Sudhānidhi, Alankāra Sudhānidhi, Kaivalyopanishad Deepikā, Dattaka Meemāmsa Pancharudriyātaka and Panineeya-Shikshā-Shāshya. Bhojanatha also contributed some important works including Maha Ganapathi Stotra, Rāmollāsa, Tripura Vijaya, Sringdra Manjari, Vashama-Mala and Govinda Sataka. Vidyaranya and Sayanacharya also oversaw commentaries on the four Vedas, the Brahmanas, and many other sacred works.

== See also ==
- Madurai Sultanate
- List of wars involving India
- Bukka I
