= Marayya Nayaka =

General in the Vijayanagara Empire

Ariya Aran Alitta Muvarayakandan Marayya Nayaka

General of the Vijayanagara Empire
- Monarch: Bukka Raya I

Personal details
- Parent: Somappa Dandanayaka
- Occupation: Commander

Military service
- Allegiance: Vijayanagara Empire
- Branch/service: Vijayanagara Army
- Years of service: 1360–1370
- Rank: General
- Unit: Vijayanagara Infantry
- Battles/wars: See list: Kampana's invasion of Madurai

Marayya Nayaka the son of Somappa Dandanayaka, was a prominent general in the Vijayanagara Empire who played a crucial role in Kumara Kampana's campaign in the Tondaimandalam region in southern India during the late medieval Hindu period. His valor and strategic brilliance earned him several titles, including Ariya Aranalitta for destroying the formidable fortresses of the Sambuvarayas and Muvarayakandan for his significant contributions to the campaign. Marayya Nayaka not only captured key fortresses but also made the Sambuvaraya ruler a prisoner, which greatly pleased both Bukka Raya I and Kumara Kampana.

== Origin ==
Marayya Nayaka, played an important role in the conquest of Tondaimandalam and Madurai under the leadership of Kumara Kampana during the Vijayanagara Empire's southern campaigns. He was the elder son of Somappa Dandanayaka, a prominent figure and minister of Kumara Kampana and had a younger brother named Dharani Appar, who is briefly mentioned in an inscription.

== Military career ==
=== Campaign in Tondaimandalam ===
==== Siege of Rajagambhiranmalai ====
After suffering a defeat at Kanchi against Kumara Kampana, the Sambuvaraya ruler fled the battlefield and sought refuge in his stronghold at the impregnable Padavidu fortress. Kumara Kampana determined to end the conflict, stationed his forces at Kanchi for a time to regroup and plan the final assault. The Vijayanagara army then launched a campaign against Rajagambhiranmalai, the hill fort protecting Padavidu. They successfully scaled the fort's walls and overwhelmed the Sambuvaraya forces, who found themselves trapped and decimated by the superior Vijayanagara troops. Maraya Nayaka, one of Kumara Kampana's key generals, is credited in inscriptions with eliminating the formidable enemy, referred to as Aliya Aran. The "Madhura Vijayam" narrates a dramatic duel between Kumara Kampana and the Sambuvaraya ruler, which ended with the latter's death, marking the decisive victory of Vijayanagara and the complete subjugation of the Sambuvaraya kingdom.

he destroyed many of the formidable fortresses of the Sambuvaraya dynasty during the campaign. His efforts in breaching these strongholds earned him the prestigious title of 'Ariya Aranalitta', meaning "the destroyer of strong fortresses".

== Rewards ==
Marayya Nayaka's exceptional military achievements during the conquest of Tondaimandalam brought him great recognition and honor from Bukka Raya I and Kumara Kampana. His successful capture of numerous impregnable fortresses belonging to the Sambuvaraya dynasty and the eventual capture of the Sambuvaraya ruler himself earned him immense praise. Overwhelmed with pride, his father, Somappa Dandanayaka, celebrated the heroic exploits of his son. Kumara Kampana bestowed upon Marayya Nayaka the title of 'Muvarayakandan'. Additionally, he was rewarded with the free gift of the village of Annamangalapparru.

== Cultural activities ==
In honor of his remarkable victory over the Sambuvaraya and the successful conquest of their fortresses, Marayya Nayaka undertook a significant act of commemoration in the village of Annamangalapparru. In 1363 CE, shortly after the defeat of the Sambuvaraya, he commissioned the construction of a tower in the second prakara (outer courtyard) of the Kulandaiyandar temple.

Marayya Nayaka also left a legacy as a pious philanthropist. Inscription No. 236 of 1928 records that he founded the village of Somappa Dandanayaka Chaturvedimangalam in honor of his father, Somappa. This village, now known as Sattampadi in Tindivanam Taluk, was transformed into a garvamanya (prestigious) village. It was divided into forty-two shares, with two shares allocated to the temple and the remaining forty distributed among Brahmins. Additionally, a record from Tirukkoyilur mentions a coconut garden donated by temple trustees in recognition of Marayya Nayaka's numerous gifts and endowments to the local Shiva temple.

== See also ==
- Gopana
- Kumara Kampana
- Saluva Mangu
