= Somappa Dandanayaka =

Indian military commander

Mahapradhani Somappa Dandanayaka

Minister of The Vijayanagara Empire
- Monarch: Bukka Raya I

Personal details
- Relations: Marayya Nayaka (Son)
- Occupation: Administrator

Military service
- Allegiance: Vijayanagara Empire
- Branch/service: Vijayanagara Council
- Years of service: 1352–1370
- Battles/wars: See list: Kampana's invasion of Madurai

Somappa Dandanayaka was a minister and Mahapradhani under Kumara Kampana of the Vijayanagara Empire. Known for his administrative and diplomatic skills, he played a key role in the restoration and endowment of temples in the Tamil region. Despite his title "Dannayaka," he was primarily a civil officer and not a military commander. Somappa oversaw land grants, tax remissions, and the rehabilitation of temple worship.

== Life ==
Somappa Dandanayaka served as the "Mahapradhani" (chief minister) and "Dannayaka" (commander) under Kumara Kampana during the Vijayanagara Empire's campaigns in the Tamil country. He appears to have been a trusted associate of Kampana from the early stages of his military and administrative endeavors in the region. Somappa played a key role in supporting Kampana’s efforts to establish Vijayanagara control over the Tondaimandalam and Madurai regions. His strong leadership and administrative acumen laid the foundation for his son, Marayya Nayaka to rise as a distinguished general.

== Civil Administration ==
The earliest recorded mention of Kumara Kampana's presence in the Tamil country dates back to 24 September 1352, in an inscription from Avur near Tiruvannamalai. This inscription highlights a significant act of patronage by Somappa Udaiyar, who granted the village of Somanathapuram, situated on the northern bank of the Southern Pennar River.

Somappa Dandanayaka, the Mahapradhani of Kumara Kampana, played a crucial role in facilitating gifts to temples and religious institutions. An inscription from Tittaikkudi records his significant donation of the village of Attiyair to a temple.

An inscription from Achiruppakkam, dated A.D. 1361, mentions a land donation to a monastery in Kanchipuram by Somappa Dandanayaka and Koppanar, showcasing their commitment to religious and cultural patronage. In 1363, Somappa, under orders from Kumara Kampana, granted sarvamanya land to the temple at Brahmadesam, further emphasizing his role in temple restoration and rehabilitation. As the Mahapradhani, Somappa not only supervised and executed royal decrees but also ensured that temple servants were treated with dignity and provided with adequate housing.

Inscription No. 203 of 1921 records the free colonization of Madavilagam by temple servants, initiated by Somappa Dandanayaka. The taxes collected from the settlement were allocated for worship and the maintenance of the temple at Serkkadu. This generous act by Somappa was aimed at ensuring the continuity of Kampana’s governance while fostering religious devotion and temple upkeep. The settlement in recognition of his contributions came to be known as Somappa Udaiyar Madavilagam.

An inscription from Marakkanam records an order issued by Somappa Dandanayaka, the Mahapradhani, to remit the taxes in cash owed by certain classes of people residing in the Madavilagam of the temple. This act of tax remission was accompanied by the foundation of a new street near the temple, highlighting Somappa's efforts to support the community and enhance religious infrastructure. The remitted taxes were specifically directed to be used for the repairs and worship in the temple of Tiruppinisvaram Udaiyar.

An inscription from Kunrattir (Chingleput District) highlights Somappa Dandanayaka’s initiative in assigning taxes collected from the Kaikkolars residing in Tirumadavijagam to the temple. This allocation was specifically made to fund the spring festival held in the first month of the year, Chittirai, reflecting his commitment to reviving traditional celebrations. Another record from Eduru in Chittoor District mentions a garvamanya grant by Somappa of the old devadana lands of the Vidaiyur temple, along with two additional villages and various taxes from the temple precincts. The inscription notes that festivals and offerings in the temple had been neglected for over 50 years, highlighting Somappa’s efforts to restore and sustain religious practices and temple activities.

Somappa Dandanayaka apart from being a distinguished administrator, was also a great Sanskrit scholar. He showcased his devotion and cultural patronage by constructing a magnificent temple dedicated to God Somanatha at Mulbagal.

== Personality ==
An inscription from Kolar lauds Somappa Dandanayaka in the highest terms, describing him as a magnanimous and virtuous individual, skilled in politics, and well-versed in various branches of learning. Despite holding the title "Dannayaka," which often denoted military officers, Somappa was not involved in military affairs but instead excelled in civil duties. His contributions were particularly significant in the restoration and rehabilitation of temples in the Tamil country. The inscriptions highlight his role in executing royal decrees, overseeing temple affairs, and ensuring the proper functioning of religious institutions.

== See also ==
- Kumara Kampana
- Marayya Nayaka
- Saluva Mangu
