= Ramabhyudayam =

15th-century Sanskrit poem

- Author: Sāḷuva Narasiṃha (traditional attribution)
- Original title: रामाभ्युदयम्
- Language: Sanskrit
- Subject: Ramayana; Saluva dynasty
- Genre: Mahākāvya; court panegyric
- Publication date: 15th century
- Publication place: Vijayanagara Empire

Ramabhyudayam (Sanskrit: रामाभ्युदयम्, IAST: rāmābhyudayam, "The Triumph of Rama") is a Sanskrit court poem traditionally attributed to Sāḷuva Narasiṃha, founder of the Saluva dynasty of the Vijayanagara Empire. Based on the story of the Ramayana, the poem also praises Narasiṃha and preserves traditions concerning his ancestry. It consequently combines epic narrative with the dynastic concerns of a late fifteenth-century Vijayanagara court.

== Historical context and contents ==
The opening canto gives a genealogy of the Sāḷuvas. It recalls the chief Guṇḍa and his descendants, including Sāḷuva Maṅgi, who accompanied Kumara Kampana on his southern campaigns and was associated with grants to the temple at Srirangam.

The poem presents Narasiṃha as a son granted to Guṇḍaya and Mallāmbikā after the couple undertook penance at Ahobilam. According to the narrative, the deity Narasimha appeared in a dream and promised them a son. Elsewhere the ruler is compared with Vishnu in his Narasiṃha form, while his victories are likened to those of Rama.

== Authorship and text ==
Although long ascribed to Sāḷuva Narasiṃha himself, the authorship is not entirely settled. Scholarship has raised the possibility that Rājanātha Ḍiṇḍima reworked an existing poem while retaining earlier material. P. Visalakshy edited a modern Sanskrit edition, published in 2003 as volume 267 of the Trivandrum Sanskrit Series. The edition contains 352 pages.

== Gallery ==
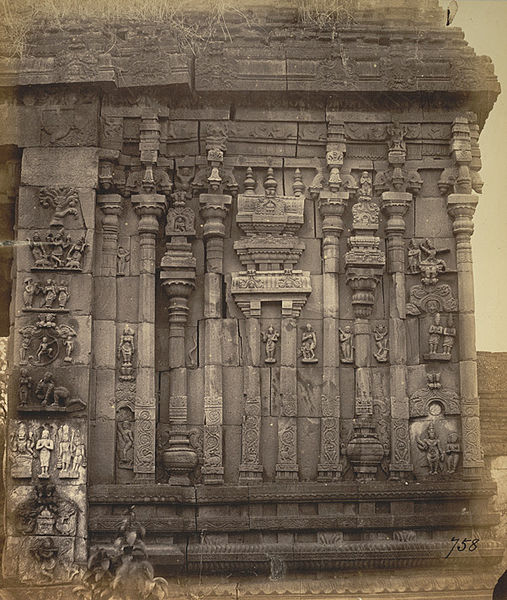
The Narasimha Temple at Ahobilam, central to the poem's account of Narasiṃha's birth

Hampi, the imperial centre of Vijayanagara

== See also ==
- Saluvabhyudayam
- Vijayanagara literature
