= Saluva Mangu =

General in the Vijayanagara army

Gandarguli Dakshina Suratrana Tribhuvanaraya Sthapanacarya Sambuvarayasthapanacarya' Saluvendra Saluva Mangu

General of The Vijayanagara Empire
- Monarch: Bukka Raya I

Personal details
- Born: Basavakalyan, Vijayanagara Empire (present-day Bidar district, Karnataka, India)
- Parent: Gunda
- Occupation: Commander

Military service
- Allegiance: Vijayanagara Empire
- Branch/service: Vijayanagara Army
- Years of service: 1350–1370
- Rank: General
- Unit: Vijayanagara Infantry
- Battles/wars: See list: Kampana's invasion of Madurai

Saluva Mangu the son of Gunda, was a distinguished general in the Vijayanagara army, serving under the command of Kumara Kampana during the 14th century. He played a pivotal role in the campaigns to conquer Madurai and Tondaimandalam. Mangu's military expertise was instrumental in decisive victories, including the defeat of the Sambuvaraya ruler in Tondaimandalam and the fall of the Madurai Sultanate. Notably, he earned the title "Sambuvarayasthapanacharya" for reinstating the Sambuvaraya as a vassal of Vijayanagara. His contributions extended beyond the battlefield, as he made significant religious endowments, including donations to the temples of Srirangam and Tirupati.

== Genealogy ==
The Saluvabhyudayam of Rajanatha Dindima and the Ramabhyudayam of Saluva Narasimha Deva Raya provide insights into the lineage of Mangu, son of Gunda, the illustrious chief of Kalyana. While three earlier members of the Saluva dynasty Mallideva, Mangideva, and Mangatha are mentioned, it was Gunda who rose to prominence through his exceptional valor and leadership. Under Gunda’s rule, Kalyana flourished, surpassing even Amaravati in its splendor. He earned renown by leading a successful expedition into Ramadurga, where he defeated the unruly ruler of the Sabharas and annexed his territories.

== Military career ==
=== First Campaign In Tondaimandalam ===
Savanna Odeyar, son of Kampana I and brother of Hari Hara Raya I, succeeded his father as the Viceroy of Udayagiri adopting the grand title "Lord of the Eastern Ocean." Inspired by Kampana’s fervor for conquest and restoration, Savanna embarked on a campaign in the south, echoing his father’s mission to end Muslim rule and defeat the ruler of Tundira. Historical inscriptions suggest that Savanna and Kumara Kampana coordinated their efforts, launching simultaneous campaigns Kumara Kampana advancing eastward and Savanna southward from their respective capitals.

Vira Savanna played a pivotal role in the preliminary campaign against the Sambuvaraya dynasty around 1350-51. Leading this crucial expedition Supporting him was his trusted general, Saluva Mangu, who earned distinction for his remarkable contributions to the campaign. Saluva Mangu’s title, Sambuvarayasthapanacharya (the subjugator of the Sambuvarayas), reflects his instrumental role in defeating the Sambuvaraya rulers and consolidating Vijayanagar’s power in the region.

Kumara Kampana’s involvement in the initial campaign against the Sambuvaraya dynasty around 1350-51 remains uncertain, though it is likely he provided reinforcements. Following the successful subjugation of the Sambuvaraya territory, Kampana is believed to have temporarily stayed in Tiruvannamalai, which served as the provisional capital of the Hoysala ruler Veera Ballala III. Meanwhile, Vira Savanna led the campaign to victory and reinstated the Sambuvaraya ruler to his position under the condition of recognizing Vijayanagar’s overlordship.

The absence of Kumara Kampana’s inscriptions in the Tamil country for several years after 1352, coupled with the presence of Vira Savanna’s inscriptions during this period, suggests that Kampana likely returned to Mulbagal following the conclusion of the first campaign. In his absence, the administration and control of the Tamil territories were entrusted to Vira Savanna.

Literary sources and inscriptions provide clear evidence that the Vijayanagar prince reinstated the Sambuvaraya ruler after his defeat, under the condition of recognizing Vijayanagar’s sovereignty. The Jaimini Bharatam explicitly praises the general Saluva Mangu for this act, stating that he reestablished the Sambuvaraya in his kingdom, earning him the honorific title Sambuvarayasthapanacharya or "the establisher of Champa." Similarly, the Saluvabhyudayam recounts that Saluva Mangu defeated the Sambuvaraya in battle and restored him to his throne. This event is further corroborated by an inscription from Villiyanallur, which references the title assumed by the general following the victory.

Savanna Udaiyar established his rule over the Tondaimandalam region, possibly as the overlord of Rajanarayana, following the Vijayanagar conquest. However, his governance faced resistance from the local populace. An inscription from Tiruvottiyur dated 1354-55 records an incident where forty-eight Agambadiyars, traditionally responsible for maintaining law and order, neglected their duties, leading to a rise in crime. This act of negligence, possibly a protest against Vijayanagar’s foreign rule, marked a period of unrest despite their previous satisfactory service. Another inscription further highlights the turbulence of this era, noting the desecration of Nayanmar images in the Tirukkariswara temple, which were later reconsecrated in 1367 by Kumara Kampana. These events reflect the challenges faced by Vijayanagar rulers in consolidating control over newly subjugated territories, as local discontent persisted despite the formal acceptance of their overlordship by leaders like Rajanarayana.

=== Second Campaign In Tondaimandalam ===
After completing his campaign in the Tamil country in 1352, Kumara Kampana returned to Mulbagal, his seat of Viceroyalty, where he remained between 1353 and 1359. This is supported by the absence of his inscriptions in the Tamil region during this period and a reference in the Madhura Vijayam, which states that Kumara Kampana spent time with his father, received counsel, and then stayed at Mulbagal, awaiting the right moment to act. During this time, Savanna Udaiyar, acting as the overlord of Tondaimandalam, closely monitored developments in the region. It was likely Savanna who communicated the news of Rajanarayana’s death and the subsequent political unrest in the Tamil country to Kumara Kampana.

The exact date of Kampana's campaign against the Sambuvaraya dynasty is uncertain, but it likely commenced shortly after the death of Rajanarayana around 1362. Kumara Kampana led a formidable army comprising over a hundred war elephants, swift cavalry, and well-equipped infantry. Entrusting Maraya Nayaka with command, Kampana departed from the Vijayanagar capital and, within five or six days, reached Kantakanana (Mulbagal). There, he paused briefly to plan his next move before advancing into Sambuvaraya territory.

Marching in stages, Kampana first halted at Virinchipuram to strategize before launching a decisive attack on the Sambuvaraya capital, Kanchi. The Vijayanagar forces laid siege to the city, engaging in a fierce battle with the Sambuvaraya army, referred to as the "Dramila" forces. The superior strength and strategy of the Vijayanagar army overwhelmed their opponents, forcing many Tamil soldiers to abandon their weapons and flee. The Sambuvaraya ruler, unable to withstand the onslaught, retreated to his stronghold at Padaiveedu. Kampana’s forces occupied Kanchi and paused there to regroup and prepare for their final assault on the Sambuvaraya fortress.

Following their occupation of Kanchi, Kumara Kampana and his forces launched an assault on the seemingly impregnable fortress of Rajagambhiranmalai. Demonstrating exceptional strategy and determination, the Vijayanagar troops successfully scaled the fort’s walls and reached the summit. The Sambuvaraya forces stationed on the hill were surrounded and faced heavy losses at the hands of the Vijayanagar army. Inscriptions praise Maraya Nayaka for his pivotal role in the campaign, crediting him with the destruction of the formidable enemy, referred to as Aliya Aran. Meanwhile, the Madhura Vijayam recounts a dramatic duel between Kumara Kampana and the Sambuvaraya ruler, during which the latter was slain.

After the defeat of the Sambuvaraya, the entire Tondaimandalam region was annexed to the Mulbagal Viceroyalty under Vijayanagar’s control. Kanchi, the stronghold of the Sambuvaraya, was subsequently established as a secondary capital for the Mulbagal governor. The Madhura Vijayam provides a poetic conclusion to Kampana's campaign, stating that after his victory, he took control of Kanchi and ensured the region’s stability, preventing any further anarchy. From this strategic city, known as Maratakanagara, Kumara Kampana governed the land peacefully and effectively. This account is corroborated by an inscription which notes that Kampana Udaiyar firmly established his rule after capturing Rajagambhirarajya, solidifying his authority over the newly annexed territories and securing Vijayanagar’s influence in the region.

=== Kampana Invasion of Madurai ===
Kumara Kampana’s campaign against Madurai likely began before 1371, as he led a vast and formidable army, including a significant contingent of well-trained war elephants. This large and powerful force is attested to by both Muslim and Hindu sources, The ensuing battle between the Hindu forces of Vijayanagar and the Muslim defenders of Madurai was fiercely contested, with neither side gaining a clear advantage for a considerable time.

During Kumara Kampana’s decisive campaign against the Muslim forces in Madurai, the turning point came when the "crow banner" of the Yavana (Muslim) king was destroyed by Kampana. This banner, symbolic of the power of the Madurai Sultan, had served as a rallying point for their hopes of victory. With the destruction of this banner, the morale of the Muslim forces crumbled. Determined to finish off the Yavana king, Kumara Kampana wielded a sword that was said to be as fearsome as the god of death, Yama. Mounted on his swift horse, Kampana skillfully dodged the blows from his enemies and struck down the Sultan. The head of the Sultan fell to the ground, a symbol of the end of the Turushka (Muslim) rule in the region. Remarkably, even after the Sultan’s head had fallen, Kumara Kampana noticed that one of the enemy's hands still gripped the reins of his horse, while the other seemed to strike back, a testament to the tenacity and defiance of the fallen ruler, even in death.

The death of the Sultan did not immediately lead to the capitulation of the Muslim forces in Madurai. Following their leader's demise in the battle between Kampana and Qurbat outside the gates, the Muslim defenders retreated into the fort, bolting the gates against the advancing Vijayanagar troops. Undeterred, the Hindu forces continued their assault. According to the Jaimini Bharatam, Saluva Mangu played a pivotal role in breaking through the fort's gate, forcing the Muslims to surrender. The incomplete final stanza of the Madhuravijayam mentions Kumara Kampana’s magnanimity, stating that he granted safety to the defeated warriors, though contrasting accounts like that of Shams-Siraj Afif claim that the Hindu victors committed acts of violence, particularly against women. Despite these differing narratives, Kumara Kampana's victory marked the end of Muslim rule in Madurai.

== Cultural Activities ==
After his victory over the Sultan, Saluva Mangu turned his attention to honoring his gods and religion. His first destination was the sacred temple of Srirangam, beautifully situated along the banks of the Kaveri River, which seemed to flow in devotion to Lord Ranganatha. At Srirangam, Mangu performed a ritual bath in the Kaveri and made significant offerings. He donated a thousand sacred Salagramas and performed all sixteen prescribed acts of charity. In addition, Mangu presented eight well-maintained agraharas to the temple, symbolizing his conquest of the eight directions. To further express his devotion, he endowed the temple with a generous donation of sixty-thousand madas of gold.

Saluva Mangu's devotion extended to the revered Venkateswara Temple at Tirupati, which also benefitted greatly from his generosity. As a mark of his faith and gratitude, Mangu commissioned the crafting of a golden kalasam (ornamental finial) and installed it atop the vimanam (tower) of the sanctum sanctorum of Sri Venkateswara's shrine.

== See also ==
- Gopana
- Vijayanagara Empire
- Kumara Kampana
