= Madurai–Delhi confrontation =

14th-century military confrontation between Madurai Sultanate and Delhi Sultanate

Date	c. 1337
Location	Pandya Nadu
Result	Madurai victory: Delhi recognises independence of Madurai

Belligerents
Madurai Sultanate	Delhi Sultanate

Commanders and leaders
Jalaluddin Ahsan Khan	Muhammad bin Tughluq

Madurai–Delhi confrontation (Note: Persian: رویارویی مدورئی-دهلی) was a failed military campaign by Muhammad bin Tughluq of the Delhi Sultanate to suppress the rebellion and reconquer the Ma'bar province (southern Tamil region, centered on Madurai), which had declared independence under Jalaluddin Ahsan Khan in 1335 CE, establishing the short-lived Madurai Sultanate (also called the Ma'bar Sultanate).

== Background ==
Following the Delhi Sultanate's earlier southern expansions under Alauddin Khalji (Malik Kafur's raids, 1310–1311) and Ghiyath al-Din Tughluq (Ulugh Khan's annexation of Ma'bar, 1323), the region was incorporated as the province of Ma'bar. In 1325, Ulugh Khan ascended as Muhammad bin Tughluq (r. 1325–1351). During the early reign of Muhammad bin Tughlaq, the Delhi Sultanate reached its greatest territorial extent, stretching from the Himalayas to the tip of South India.

In 1335, Jalaluddin Ahsan Khan (r. 1335–1339), the governor of the province of Ma'bar (with its capital at Madurai ruling Tiruchirappalli and parts of South Arcot), declared independence. He struck coins in his own name and stopped sending tribute to Delhi, betting on the fact that Madurai was the most distant province from the Sultan's reach amid widespread rebellions triggered by Muhammad bin Tughluq's unpopular policies such as the forced capital shift to Daulatabad and the introduction of token money.

== Campaign ==
Muhammad bin Tughlaq reacted with characteristic fury. He mobilized a massive imperial army and marched south from Delhi to crush the rebellion personally. The Sultan reached the Deccan (Daulatabad) with relative ease, intending to use it as a base of operations for the invasion of the far south. As the imperial army moved further south toward the Krishna River in Warangal and Bidar, a devastating bubonic plague (often referred to in Persian sources as waba) broke out within the ranks. The epidemic decimated the Sultan's elite cavalry and officers. Contemporary chronicler Ibn Battuta (who was Ahsan Khan's son-in-law but stayed at the Delhi court at the time) notes that the Sultan himself fell ill.

Jalaluddin Ahsan Khan's forces defeated the remaining or pursuing Delhi troops, preventing reconquest. Unable to maintain a fighting force due to the disease and facing additional rebellions in Bengal and the Doab, Muhammad bin Tughlaq was forced to abandon the campaign in 1337. He retreated to Delhi, leaving the southern provinces to their fate.

== Aftermath ==
Jalaluddin Ahsan Khan took this opportunity to consolidate his power, effectively winning the war by default. Within a decade, the Vijayanagara Empire (1336) and the Bahmani Sultanate (1347) would emerge, permanently ending Delhi's hegemony in the south. The Delhi Sultanate never again managed to exert direct control over the far south of the Indian peninsula.

The Madurai Sultanate established by Ahsan Khan lasted only until 1378, when it was eventually conquered by the rising power of the Vijayanagara Empire.
