= Saluvabhyudayam =

15th-century Sanskrit court epic on Saluva Narasimha

- by Rājanātha Ḍiṇḍima
- Original title: सालुवाभ्युदयम्
- Written: c. 1480
- Language: Sanskrit
- Subject(s): Saluva Narasimha Deva Raya and the Saluva dynasty
- Form: Mahākāvya

The Saluvabhyudayam (Sanskrit: सालुवाभ्युदयम्, IAST: sāḷuvābhyudayam, "The Rise of the Sāḷuvas", also Saluvabhyudaya) is a Sanskrit mahākāvya composed by the court poet Rajanatha Dindima (IAST: rājanātha ḍiṇḍima) around 1480. It celebrates Saluva Narasimha Deva Raya, later founder of the Saluva dynasty of the Vijayanagara Empire. The poem combines dynastic history and courtly praise, presenting his ancestry, campaigns and kingship within a religious framework centred on Narasimha of Ahobilam.

== Historical context ==
The work was composed during the decline of the Sangama dynasty, before Saluva Narasimha took the imperial throne in 1485. The poem draws on a wider convention of Sanskrit court poetry in which rulers were presented through divine and epic models. In the second canto, Narasimha of Ahobilam is portrayed as becoming incarnate as Saluva Narasimha, linking the ruler's military power and claim to kingship with the sacred authority of the Narasimha cult.

== Contents ==
The poem has thirteen sargas (cantos). It recounts the Saluva genealogy and the exploits of Narasimha and his ancestors. Saluva Mangu receives particular attention: his campaigns against Sambuva Raya and the Madurai Sultanate, his role in Kumara Kampana's southern campaigns and his gifts to the Srirangam temple are described.

The later cantos praise Saluva Narasimha's military and royal achievements. As a court eulogy, the poem idealises its subject and is read alongside inscriptions and other historical sources.

== Manuscripts and study ==
A Madras manuscript catalogue records a Devanagari paper copy (No. 11818) and a Grantha palm-leaf manuscript (No. 11819), both complete in thirteen cantos. Extracts and an English summary were published by S. Krishnaswami Aiyangar in 1919.

== Notable figures ==
Rājanātha Ḍiṇḍima was the author and court poet; Saluva Narasimha Deva Raya is the principal subject. Saluva Mangu, an important ancestor, and Kumara Kampana, under whom Mangu campaigned in the Tamil country, also figure in the dynastic narrative.

== Gallery ==
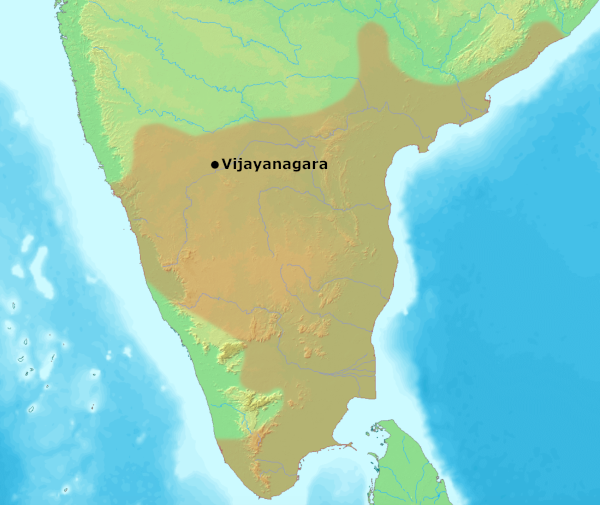
The Vijayanagara Empire around the beginning of Saluva rule

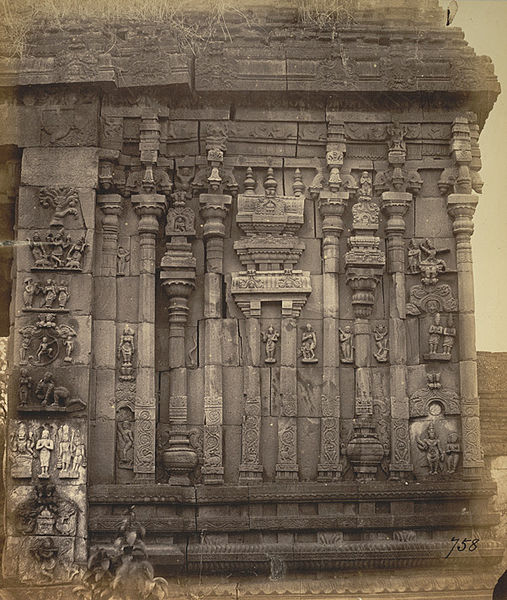
Narasimha temple at Ahobilam, central to the poem's royal imagery

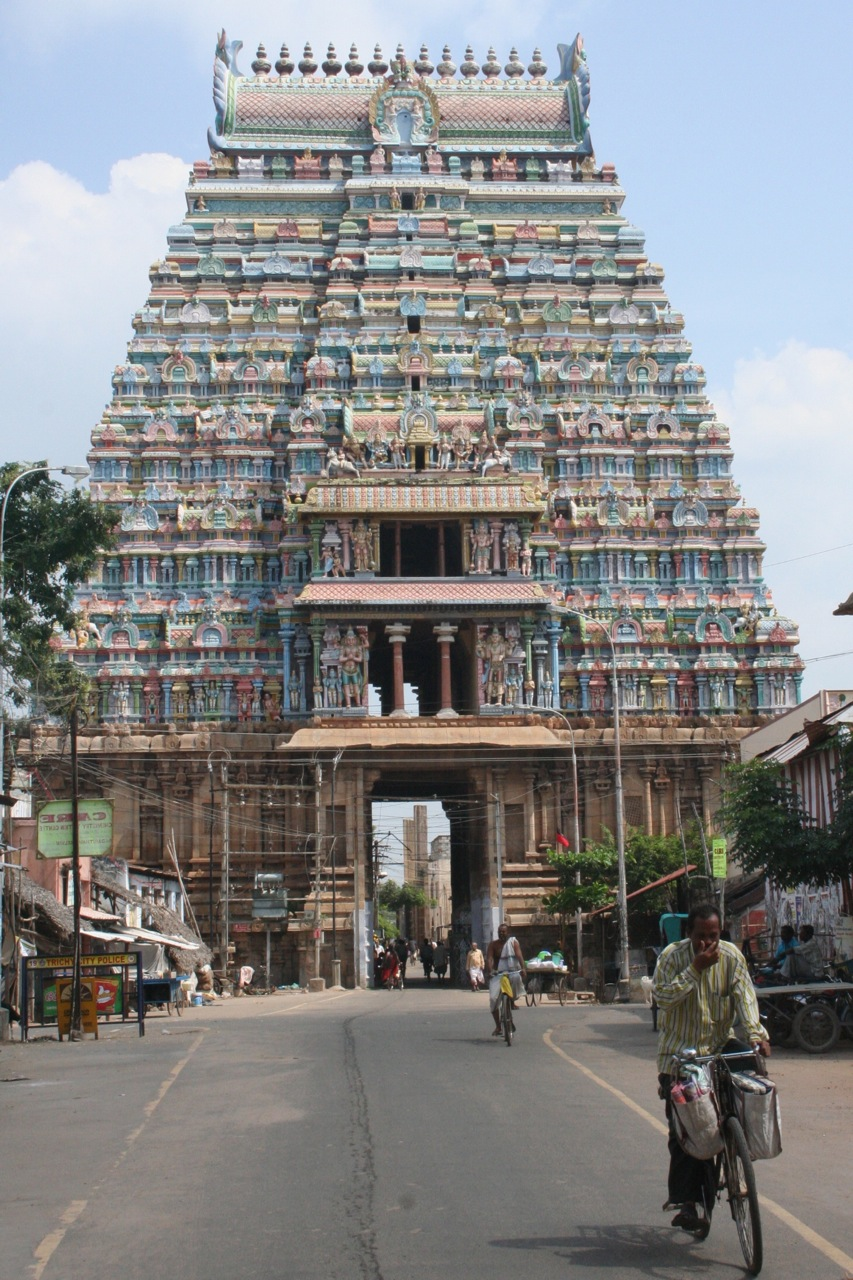
Srirangam, associated with Saluva Mangu's endowments
