= Shailendra Pandya =

Indian human rights activist (born 1987)

Member of the Rajasthan State Commission for Protection of Child Rights
- In office 2019–2022

Personal details
- Born: Shailendra Pandya; 27 March 1987 (age 39) Udaipur, Rajasthan, India
- Education: PhD
- Occupation: Social Activist

Shailendra Pandya (born 27 March 1987, Udaipur) is an Indian child rights activist and former member of the Rajasthan State Commission for Protection of Child Rights, Government of Rajasthan. In 2022, he became the director of Gayatri Seva Sansthan (GSS).

In October 2024, he received recognition for contributions to child welfare at the Indo-Arab Leader summit in Dubai.

== Early life ==
Pandya was born in 1987 in Udaipur, Rajasthan. He graduated from the University of Rajasthan in 2009 with a degree in computer engineering. He completed his master's degree in social work at Janardan Rai Nagar Rajasthan Vidyapeeth University in 2012.

== Career ==
Pandya began his professional career working to protect child rights and joined the Rajasthan State Commission for Protection of Child Rights as state in charge of Child Labour Cell. There he was involved in policies and programs for the eradication and rehabilitation of child labour

== Notable works ==
In 2019, during an interstate rescue in Surat with Rajasthan Police, he rescued 138 children workers who had been brought there to work. 128 of the children were from Rajasthan.

On 12 June 2022, he was involved in a 'Child Labour Free Udaipur' project in which 91 children were rescued from various workplaces and 17 FIRs were registered against 54 employers. 60 of the children were re-enrolled in education.

During the COVID-19 pandemic he conducted a Situational Analysis of Tribal Child Labour, where 865 migrant children returned to their villages for rehabilitation. He worked with the district administration, creating a helpline to report cases, which prevented 15 child marriages.

He was a speaker at Tedx Pradhikaran at D Y Patil Vidyapeeth in 2023.

== Recognition ==
- Leadership Excellence Award: Outstanding Contribution for Protection of Child Rights in India (2022)
- India’s 100 under 40 ‘Social Leaders’ award: Child Rehabilitation and Child Rights in India (2022)
- Social Change Makers award: Child protection (2017)
- Laadli Award: child protection and girl child education in tribal areas (2014)
