= Pandya Nadu =

Pandya Nadu Thenpandimandalam
- Geographical region
- Pandya/Pandi Nadu
- Pandya Nadu region within Tamil Nadu
- Country: India
- State: Tamil Nadu
- Covering districts: Madurai, Dindigul, Theni, Sivaganga, Virudhunagar, Ramanathapuram, Tenkasi, Tirunelveli, Thoothukudi, Kanyakumari
- Largest City: Madurai
- Area: 30,108.13 sqkm

Government
  - Body: Government of Tamil Nadu, Government of India

Population
  - Total: 15,616,770

Languages
  - Major: Tamil, English
  - Others: Telugu, Kannada, Malayalam, Saurashtra
- Time zone: Indian Standard Time

Pandya Nadu or Pandi Nadu is a geographical region comprising the southern and south-western parts of the present day state of Tamil Nadu. The region is bounded on its West by the Venad/Ay Nadu, Northeast by the Chola Nadu and Northwest by the Kongu Nadu. It comprises the present-day districts of Madurai, Dindigul, Theni, Sivaganga, Virudhunagar, Ramanathapuram, Tirunelveli, Tenkasi, Thoothukudi and Kanniyakumari.

The region was the principal historic seat of the Pandya dynasty who ruled it intermittently and with differing capacities at least from the 4th century BCE to 1759 CE. The political capital of the region is the city of Madurai with Korkai serving as a secondary capital and the principal port city during the early historic period.

After the end of the Sangam age in the third century CE, the region came under of the occupation of the Kalabhras who continued to possess it till the Pandyan reconquest led by Kadungon who founded the First Pandyan Empire. The Medieval Cholas conquered the region from the Pandyas in the 10th century and renamed it the Rajaraja Pandimandalam. The region became independent once again with the rise of the Second Pandyan Empire which continued to be the dominant power in Tamil Nadu until the invasions of the Delhi Sultanates. The result of which was the formation of the independent Madurai Sultanate with the Pandya rulers pushed southwards from the Vaigai belt. The Madurai Sultanate was then overthrown by the Vijayanagara Prince, Kumara Kampana, and the region was reinstated to the later Pandyas as vassals and as one of the rajyams under the Vijayanagara Empire. After the decline of the Vijayanagara Empire in the 16th century, the Nayaks of Madurai declared independence and ruled the region until the conquest of the Nawab of Carnatic which was then followed shortly by the British annexation in the 18th century into the Madras Presidency.

== Etymology ==
Pandya Nadu is named after the Pandya dynasty which was one of the three crowned dynasties of ancient Tamilakam. As to the etymology of the word Pandya or Pandi, scholars have not a consensual answer but the exact meaning of the word may refer to the Old Tamil words for Ploughing or Bull or Old/Ancient.

== Geographical Extent ==
The exact borders to the region of Pandya Nadu is not well-defined and was probably different during different historical period. But rough approximations to the boundary can be found in the poem Pandimandala Sathakam. Mandala Sathakams are collections of poems written about specific geographical regions in Tamil, dating variously from 1000s to 1700s CE.

"North of Kumari Sea, South of Vellar,

East of Dindigul and Karaikadu,

West of Sethu, lies the land of

Pandiyan, ruled by the Great Maran!"

—Passage 98 from Pandimandala Sathakam states

From this poem, which was written by Madurai Ayyamperumal Asiriyar, it can be inferred that at the time of his authorship, the Pandimandalam or Pandya Nadu extended South of River Vellar (River South Vellar, present-day Pudukottai district), North of Kumari Sea (Indian Ocean), West of Sethu (present-day Ramanathapuram district) and East of Dindigul (City in present-day Dindigul district) & Karaikadu (Village in present-day Kanniyakumari district).

== History ==
Pandya Nadu was one of the earliest territorial divisions of the ancient Tamilakam, the home of the Tamil people at least from the 6th century BCE. The region is home to many neolithic and megalithic settlements. The archaeological sites of Adichanallur and Korkai are one of the oldest Iron Age settlements in Tamil Nadu with radiocarbon dating assigning the locations to the 9th century BCE. Other historical sites like Keezhadi have been dated to 6th century BCE by the ongoing excavations by the Tamil Nadu Archaeological Department.

=== During the Sangam Age ===
Between the 3rd century BCE and 3rd century CE, the region was ruled the Sangam Pandyas with Madurai and Korkai as their capitals. The period produced the beautiful Tamil Sangam literatures which provides a clear window to the life of Tamil people of the age. Under the Sangam Pandyan rule, the region served as one of richest locations in India with its extensive involvement in maritime trades with Southeast Asia and the Western world. The Pandyan pearls, fished from the Gulf of Mannar and the Pearl Coast, were found to be of the highest quality and were adorned by the people of the Roman Empire. Literacy was also widespread in this region during this time owing to the found presence of the most number of Tamil Brahmi rock inscriptions and pot sherd markings.

=== Under the Kalabhras ===
The region entered a dark period (with reference to absence of records) in history with the end of the 3rd century BCE. The three crowned Kings of Tamilakam were displaced by the Kalabhras during this time and the region experienced a huge boom of Buddhist and Jain activities. Under the patronage of the Kalabhras, the Jains formed a literary academy in Madurai producing some of the most wonderful literatures in Tamil language. The famous Jain poet Sithalai Sathanar of Manimegalai is thought to have lived in Madurai during this age.

=== Under the First Pandyan Empire ===
The Pandyan Kingdom was restored in the 6th century CE by the King Kadungon who managed to push off the Kalabhra presence from Tamilakam along with the Pallavas. During this period, the Tamil country was divided up between the Pandyas and Pallavas, with the Pandyas even managing to vassalize the Tulu, Chera, Ay and Venad Kingdoms of the West Coast. Despite a huge Buddhist and Jain presence, the region was one of the epicenters of the Bhakti movement which brought into limelight the cults of Gods Shiva and Perumal with beautiful devotional Tamil compositions. This period also saw significant evolution in material culture with the building of one of the oldest rock cut temples at Pillayarpatti. Many temples like the rock temples of Kazhugumalai were also built during this period.

=== Under the Chola Empire ===
The Medieval Cholas rose from their obscurity in the late 9th century and established their hold in the historical Chola Nadu region. By the 10th century, various Chola kings and princes have claimed to have subdued and annexed the Pandya Nadu in their stone inscriptions, ending the First Pandyan Empire. The region was then renamed Rajaraja Pandimandalam and incorporated into the Chola administration as a Mandalam with the title of Chola-Pandya having been introduced and given to the Chola Governors of the region.

=== Under the Second Pandyan Empire ===
After the steady decline of the Chalukya Cholas in the 12th century CE, the Pandya princes managed to establish themselves as an independent entity. The early years of the Second Pandyan Empire saw numerous civil wars with two factions being supported each by the Chola and the Sinhalese Monarchs. The Second Pandyan Kingdom entered its peak during the 13th century under the reigns of Maravarman Sundara Pandyan and Maravarman Kulasekhara Pandyan. Marco Polo, a famed European traveler visited the Pandya Empire during this period and celebrated the region as being one of the wealthiest and noblest in the whole world. Unfortunately, the Second Pandyan Empire met a crashing downfall owing to the civil war between the two sons of Maravarman Kulasekhara Pandyan.

=== Under the Madurai Sultanate ===
The frequent brotherly civil wars between the sons of the Emperor Maravarman Kulasekhara Pandyan made the region prone to external attacks and invasions. One such attack came from the Delhi Khilji Sultanate under the infamous Malik Kafur as a raiding campaign. This campaign plundered the city of Madurai along with other important cities of northern Tamil Nadu, revealing the weakened state of the Pandya rule. Despite the Pandya rule continuing after the Turkish raid, many regions under the empire declared independence. The final blow to the Pandyan Empire came under multiple direct invasions by the Tuglaq Sultanate. Northern parts of the Pandya Nadu were annexed into the Delhi Sultanate and a separate governorship was established which later got independent and became the Madurai Sultanate. The descendants of the Second Pandyan Emperors were pushed further south, into the Thenpandi Nadu regions of Tinnevelly.

=== Under the Vijayanagara Empire ===
As a result of multiple Delhi invasions into the Southern India, a new political power was emerging in the Kannada and Telugu countries, called the Vijayanagara Empire. The empire successfully managed to repel the Turkic presence in Southern India after they destroyed the Madurai Sultanate under the leadership of Prince Kumara Kampana. The Vijayanagara Emperors restored the Pandya Kings and vassalized them as one of the Rajyams under their rule. This situation continued until the rise of the Chola Prince Virasekhara Chola who managed to defeat Chandrasekhara Pandya from Madurai. The lost Pandya King sought the Vijayanagara Emperor's help, who sent Nagama Nayak, a general with a huge army to liberate Madurai. Nagama Nayak succeeded in defeating the Chola Prince, but instead of restoring the Pandya King, he declared independence from the Vijayanagara rule with himself as the new King of Pandya Nadu. This rebellion was then put down by the Vijayanagara Emperor under Viswanatha Nayak who was Nagama's son. The Emperor then gifted the Pandya and Chola rajyams to Viswanatha Nayak's direct rule as a reward. The Pandyas moved their capital into Tenkasi and continued to rule the southern portions of Pandya Nadu, nominally. The period also saw the annexation of Kanniyakumari region by the Kings of Venad.

=== Under the Madurai Nayaks ===
The descendants of Viswanatha Nayak declared independence from the Vijayanagara Empire after its decline and continued as the Madurai Nayak dynasty. The various kings of the dynasty had marital alliances with the Later Pandyas of Tenkasi towards securing the legitimacy for their rule. The Madurai Nayaks had under them during their peak, Kongu Nadu, Chola Nadu and Venadu regions. The Kingdom, unfortunately met a crashing fall after multiple internal squabbles which resulted in the kingdom's fracturing and the later annexation by the Nawab of Carnatic.

=== Under the British Rule ===
The English East India Company managed to invade and annex the former territories of the Nawab of Carnatic into their Madras Presidency. Under the British rule, the Pandya Nadu was divided into two districts, namely Madura and Tinnevelly. These later got subdivided into Madura, Ramnad and Tinnevelly and continued to be so till the independence of India in 1947.

=== Under the Republic of India ===
The region was part of the Madras State under the newly independent India, which was subsequently renamed Tamil Nadu. The region of Kanniyakumari was transferred to Tamil Nadu. The region now comprises the districts of Madurai, Dindigul, Theni, Sivaganga, Ramanathapuram, Virudhunagar, Tirunelveli, Tenkasi, Thoothukudi, Kanniyakumari and Pudukkottai (South of Vellar).

== See also ==
- Kongu Nadu
- Tondai Nadu
- Chola Nadu
- Venad
- Tulunadu
- Alupa dynasty
