= Gopana =

Gopanarya
- Born: 14th century Gingee, Tamil Nadu
- Occupation(s): Governor of Gingee, Commander-in-chief
- Title: mirror of earthly fame,
- Father: Narasanamatya

Gopana (c. 14th century CE) was an army officer and a Telugu poet who composed Sindhumati Vilasamu, the first Telugu literary work of the Southern school. Gopana was also one of the important generals in the army of the Vijayanagara prince Kumara Kampana II and played a leading role in the conquest of the Madurai Sultanate.

Gopana who was the General of Kumara Kampana II, the son of Bukka Raya the founder of Vijayanagara empire credited to sweep the country clear of Islamic invaders, killed the Muslim governor at Madurai, restored the temple of Srirangam to its former condition. The idol of Ranganatha was restored to its own home.

== Personal life ==
Gopana was born in an Arvela Niyogi Brahmin family and belonged to the Bharadwaja gotra. His father was one Narasanamatya.

== Military career ==
Gopana joined the service of the Vijayanagara Empire at an early age and was one of the leading commanders in Kumara Kampana's 1371 expedition against the Madurai Sultanate which resulted in the successful conquest of Srirangam and restoration of the Ranganathaswamy Temple to its former glory. Gopana marching of srirangam at the head of large army destroyed the Muslim forces who replaced the three images in their shrine at Srirangam, after re- consecrating the god and his two consorts.

The Writing on the Wall: The Śrīrangam and Kāñcī Inscriptions

Hail Prosperity, Wealth, our Great Goddess
In the year 1371-72: Gopanārya, mirror of earthly fame, after carrying Rańga's Lord back down the dark hills of Tirumälai that charm the whole world with their shiny black peaks he worshipped that god for a time in his fortress of Gingee. And when he had spoiled the Muslims whose ranks bristled with raised bows, he set him up again in his own home town- the Lord of Rańga and his two wives, Lakşmī and Earth. It was there he gave to the god perfect honor and praise!

Second inscription-

After he carried Rańga's exiled king, the Lord of the World, down the slopes of Bull Mountain to his royal city, Gopana-the brahman chieftain-cut down, with his bare hands, the Muslim soldiers; mingling the soil of Srīrangam with the earth of the Golden Age he installed the king in his city again, with his wives Lakşmī and Earth, and offered worship worthy of the Lotus-Born Brahmā.

== Literary works ==
Gopana's only literary work of merit is the Sindhumati Vilasamu, a poem in Telugu. It relates the love affair between Jaya and Sindhumathi in Madurai. The poem consists of a total of two cantos and has a lot of Sanskrit shlokas interspersed in between.

== Religious affiliation ==
Gopana was an ardent devotee of Venkateswara and attributed his literary prowess to Venkateswara's grace. During his expedition into the Tamil country, Gopana came under the influence of Vedanta Desika and became a follower of visishtadvaita

== Sources ==
- Rao, N. Venkata (1978). The southern school in Telugu literature. University of Madras. pp. 1–2.
