= Commissions for Protection of Child Rights Act, 2005 =

Act of the Parliament of India

Parliament of India
- Long title: An Act to provide for the constitution of a National Commission and State Commissions for Protection of Child Rights and Children's Courts for providing speedy trial of offences against children or of violation of child rights and for matters connected therewith or incidental thereto.
- Citation: The Commissions for Protection of Child Rights Act, 2005
- Enacted by: Parliament of India
- Enacted: 20 January 2006
- Commenced: 5 February 2007
- Introduced by: Ministry of Women and Child Development
- Status: In force

The Commissions for Protection of Child Rights Act, 2005 is a law enacted by the Parliament of India, which provides for constitution of National commission and state commissions for the rehabilitation, prosperity and wellbeing of children. The act was primarily enforced in Indian administered states and its union territories to protect child rights. The act further provides constitution for establishment of children's court where the offenses against children rights or exploitation of child rights be trialed speedily.

== Background ==
The Commission such as National commission consists of 6 members including a Chairperson.

The presiding officer should be well experienced in specified respects such as rehabilitation, promotion and protection of the minors and make necessary efforts for their prosperity.

Six members including presiding officer of the commission should be fully aware of rules and regulations created to Child labour law and experienced enough in flourishing children, such as Education, Health, removing of Child labour measures, understanding psychological problems of children who are socially impacted and its measures.

One member of the commission should be a woman with same abilities as specified for of other members.

The appointment of members or chairperson are made by the selection panel constituted by the Government of India.

== Commission Sections ==
The chairperson of the commission should belong to or has worked in office of the "Department of Women and Child Development".

=== Term of service ===
The selection criteria of the Commission chairperson or its other officials involves at least three members and are directly appointed by the central government for the term of three years of service and not more than three years.

In case, any member or chairperson of the commission is willing to resign from the service, it should be sent to the central government in a written-resignation application or letter.

If any member including chairperson while exercising the power, found functioning incorrectly, or exercising its power inappropriately, they are subject to get removed from the office by the order issued under notification from the central government.

== Functions of Commission ==
The duties and functions of the commission is to look after the welfare, well-beingness, prosperity and rehabilitation of child and protection of child rights at the central level as amended by the certain sections of the act. If any person of any rank found exploiting child rights, the commission is authorized to punish the accused as amended.

== List of commissions ==
In 2010 Government of Rajasthan formed Rajasthan State Commission for Protection of Child Right as an independent state level agency under the act.
