= Sambuvarayar =

Ancient kingdom of South India

Sambuvaraya dynasty
- 12th century CE–1375 CE
- Capital: Rajagambhiram, Padaveedu
- Common languages: Tamil
- Religion: Hinduism
- Government: Monarchy
  - 1236 - 1268 CE: Raja Gambhira Sambhuvaraya
  - 1322 - 1337 CE: Mankonda Sambhuvaraya
  - 1337 - 1373 CE: Rajanarayana Sambhuvaraya
  - 1356 - 1375 CE: Rajanarayana Sambhuvaraya II
- Historical era: Middle Ages
  - Established: 12th century CE
  - Disestablished: 1375 CE
Preceded by	Succeeded by
Pandyan dynasty	Vijayanagar Empire

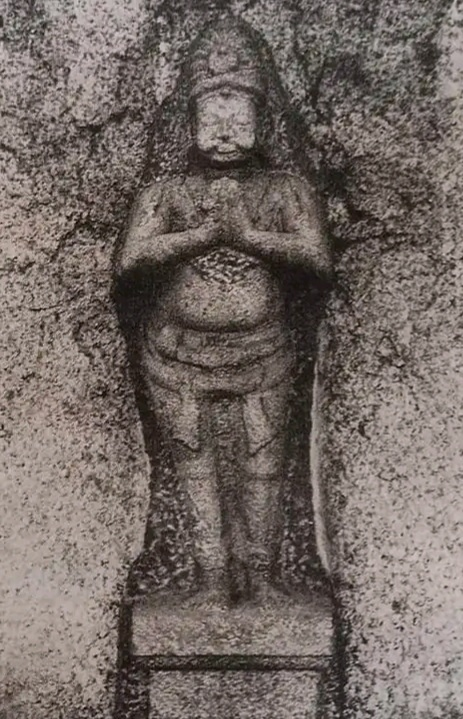
Raja Gambhira Sambhuvarayar I

The Sambuvarayar (Tamil: சம்புவராயர்) chieftains once ruled the Tondaimandalam region of South India. Among them was Edirili Chola Sambhuvaraya, a vassal under Rajadhiraja Chola II and Kulothunga Chola III, who ruled the northern part of Tondaimandalam, now comprising the districts of Vellore, Tiruvannamalai, Kancheepuram, Cuddalore, Tiruvallur, Nellore, and Chittoor. Later during the 14th century when the Telugu Cholas, Hoysala and Pandya kingdoms went into decline, the Sambuvarayas ruled their regions independently. Two chiefs of the family namely, Venrumankonda Sambuvaraya (1322 CE) and Rajanarayana Sambuvaraya (1337 CE), issued records in their own regnal years.

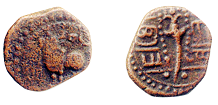
Sambuvarayar Coins

== Origin ==
The early Sambuvarayas chiefs originally ruled the region of Oyma Nadu, now a part of present day Tindivanam taluk of Viluppuram district under the imperial Cholas. The Sambuvaraya capital was at Padaveedu, now known as Padavedu in Polur taluk, Tiruvannamalai district, Tamil Nadu. Padaveedu (also spelt Padavedu) is the site of the popular Sri Renukambal Temple. The Sambuvarayas belonged to the Vanniyar community, and had the title 'Nalayiravan', as they controlled a subordinate army of 4000 soldiers in their initial days.

== Rajagambhiram fort ==
The vassal had constructed a hill fort, Rajagambhiram, at present day Padaveedu, to watch and control the movements of the northern enemies. The fort has four gates in four directions. The northern gate was now called as Shanta gate. The other gates were damaged. While the eastern gate was in a dilapidated condition, the western gate on which was found the inscription has been completely damaged. This gate was named after Puvandai alias Cholakon, one of the soldier in the military service of Edhirili Chola Sambhuvaraya. One hero stone has been erected on the plains, north of the Shanta gate.

The fort was constructed with granite with a perimeter extending to 2 kilometres (1.2 mi). This fort once had residences and `pandals' for warriors who were posted for duties. Holes had been made on the rock surface in such a way as to erect round tents. One could see nine tent areas on the top of the hill. Besides, four water tanks had been created to provide drinking water. Two natural water ponds were also available in the fort. Near the big tank a mortar with one foot depth and one foot diameter was dug and used. The area also revealed clear traces of Shiva and Vinayaka temples. Stone blocks, bricks each measuring 10 inches x 7 inches, lime mortar and sand were used in the construction of the fort walls.

== Decline ==
The Sambuvarayas lost power and went into decline with the rapid expansion of the Vijayanagar Empire in the 14th century. Rajanarayana Sambuvaraya allied with the Vijayanagar ruler Harihara I against the Sultanate of Madura but was later killed by Harihara's brother Bukka Raya I who sought to bring most of South India under his rule.

== See also ==
- Pallava
