= Rajasthan State Commission for Protection of Child Rights =

Rajasthan State Commission for Protection of Child Rights राजस्थान राज्य बाल अधिकार संरक्षण आयोग

Agency overview
- Formed: 23 February 2010

Jurisdictional structure
- Federal agency (Operations jurisdiction): India
- Operations jurisdiction: India
- Legal jurisdiction: Jaipur
- Governing body: Government of India
- Constituting instrument: Government of Rajasthan
- General nature: Federal law enforcement

Operational structure
- Overseen by: Ministry of Women and Child Development
- Headquarters: Jaipur, Rajasthan
- Parent agency: National Commission for Protection of Child Rights

Website
- Official website

The Rajasthan State Commission for Protection of Child Rights (RSCPCR) was constituted by the Government of Rajasthan in 2010 to address the public grievances relating to child rights violations as per the Commissions for Protection of Child Rights Act, 2005.

== Functions ==
It aims to uphold and defend the rights of children in the state. It oversees the enforcement of laws related to children, including the Protection of Children from Sexual Offences (POCSO) Act, 2012, and the Right of Children to Free and Compulsory Education Act, 2009, as outlined in Sections 13, 14, and 15 of the CPCR Act, 2005, and Section 9 of the RCPCR Rules, 2010.
