= Gangadevi =

Indian princess and Sanskrit poet

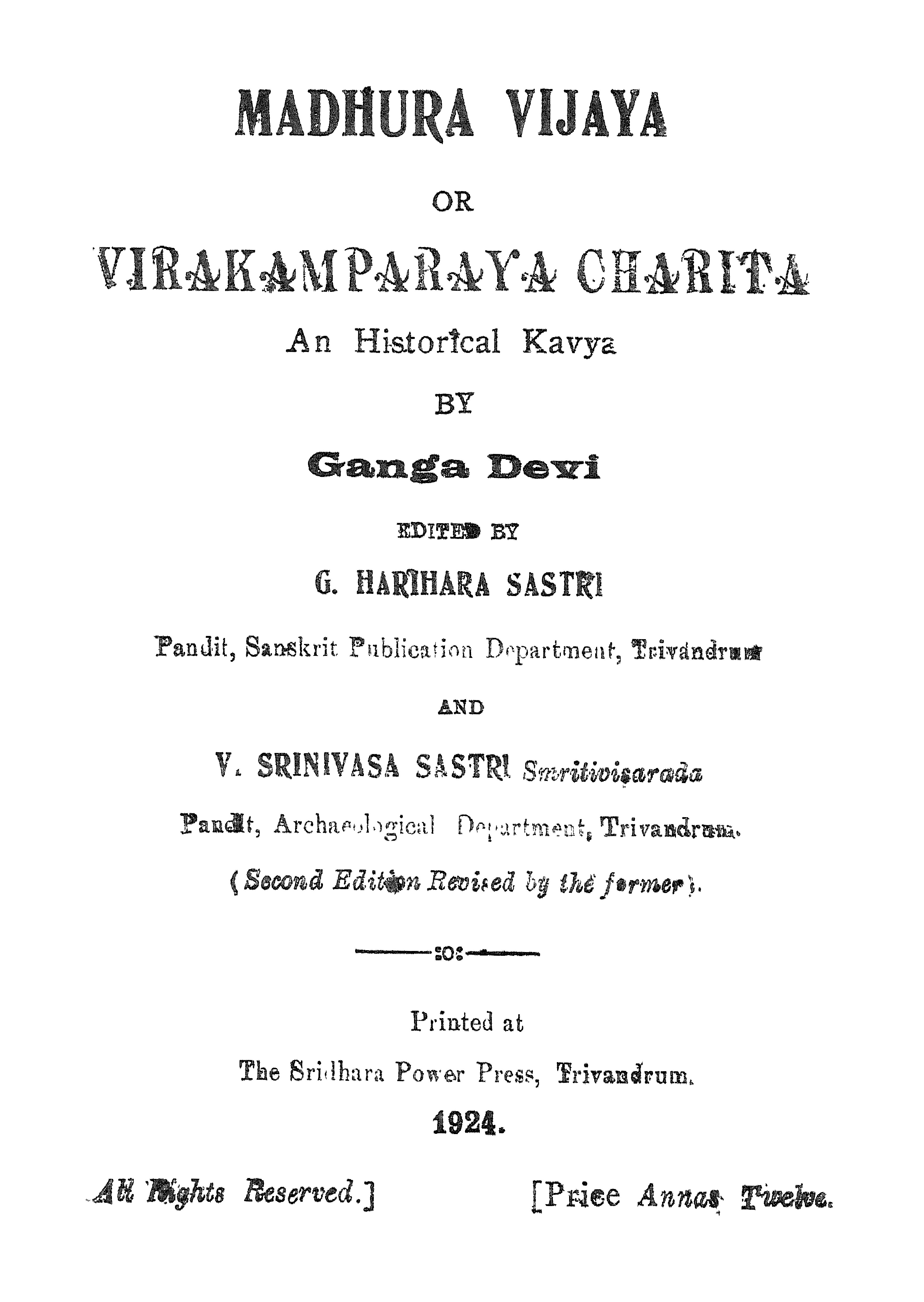
Madura Vijayam 1924 Edition

Gangadevi, also known as Gangambika, was a 14th-century princess and Sanskrit-language poet of the Vijayanagara Empire of present-day India.

== Life and work ==
Gangadevi was the wife of Veerakamparaya, son of the Vijayanagara monarch Bukka Raya I (c. 1360s-1370s).

Gangadevi chronicled the story of her husband's victory over the Turko-Persian Muslims of the Madurai Sultanate in the form of this poem, which contains nine chapters and was named Madhura Vijayam, also known as Veerakamparaya Charitram. After the discovery of the documents, a Tamil version was published by Sri Krishnamacharya of Srirangam. Annamalai University published an English translation in 1950. In addition to writing, she also fought in battle with her husband and inspired other women.

== Influence ==
Gangadevi is a key inspiration for Pampa Kampana, the protagonist of Salman Rushdie's novel Victory City.
