= Jalaluddin Ahsan Khan =

Sultan of Ma'bar from 1335 to 1339

- Sultan

1st Sultan of Ma'bar
- Reign: 1335–1339
- Successor: Ala-ud-din Udauji Shah
- Born: Kaithal, Delhi Sultanate
- Died: 1339
- Issue: Ibrahim
- Religion: Islam

Jalaluddin Ahsan Khan (died 1339), initially Hasan Kaithali, also known as Jalal al-Din Ahsan Shah, was the first Sultan of Madurai Sultanate and father-in-law of the great traveller Ibn Battuta.

== Origin ==
The founder of the Madurai Sultanate, Jalaluddin Ahsan Khan. He was called a Sayyid native of Kaithal. Some historical accounts also being called an Afghan, though the legitimacy of such a claim is questionable.

== Declaration of independence ==
In 1335, Jalaluddin Ahsan Khan, the Muslim Governor of Madurai, declared his independence and established the independent sultanate of Madurai. As a response to his rebellion, the Sultan of Delhi punished the Sayyid and other Indian Muslim inhabitants of Kaithal out of spite for Ahsan Khan as he belonged to Kaithal. He claimed the whole of the Delhi Sultanate province of Ma'bar which included a small part of the ancient Tamil country. However, he scarcely had any authority beyond the realm of the Pandyas and the territory to the north of the river Kaveri was largely independent under the Cholas and the Hoysalas.

== Reign ==
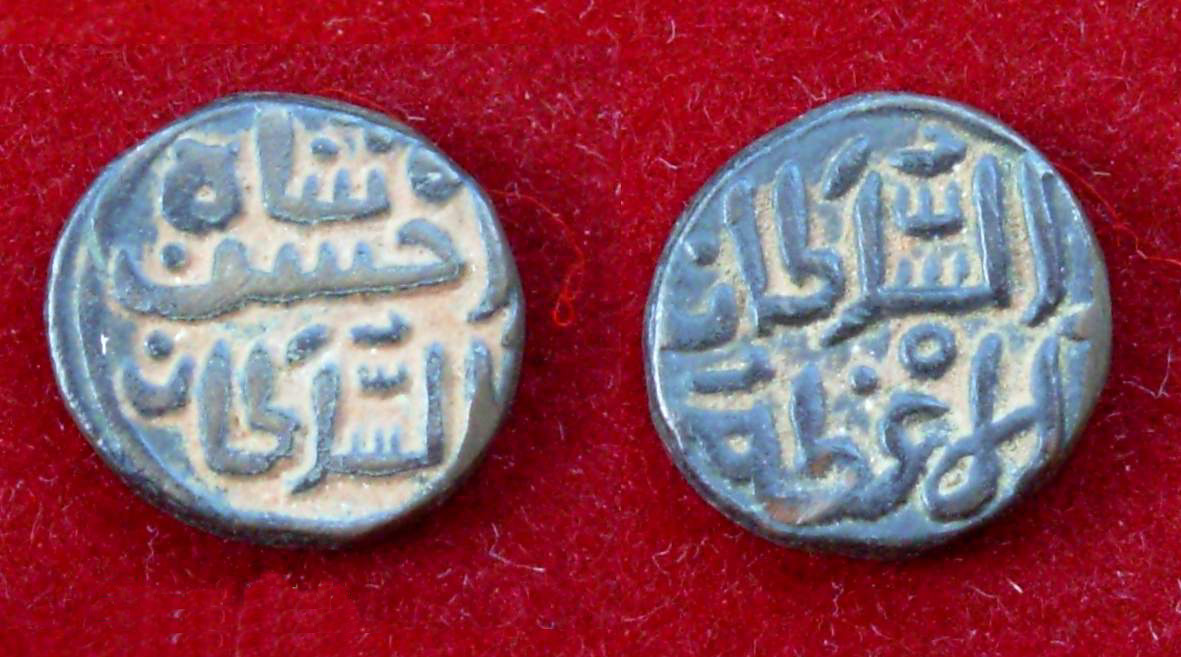
Coin of Jalaluddin Ahsan Khan, first ruler of the Sultanate of Madurai

Jalaluddin Ahsan Khan took over as the independent sultan of Madurai in 1335. Ferishta, however, gives a date of 1341 for his assumption of the sultanate. Ferishta refers to Ahsan Khan as Syed, Hasan and Husun. Ahsan Khan was also the father-in-law of the Moorish traveller Ibn Battuta. Immediately, Muhammad bin Tughluq sent an army to reassert his control over the region. But Ahsan Khan easily defeated this army. Tughluq took his revenge by killing Ahsan Khan's son Ibrahim who was the purse-bearer of the emperor. Ahsan Khan was killed in 1339 by one of his nobles after having ruled for a brief span of 4 years.
