= Madhura Vijayam =

14th-century Sanskrit poem by Gangadevi

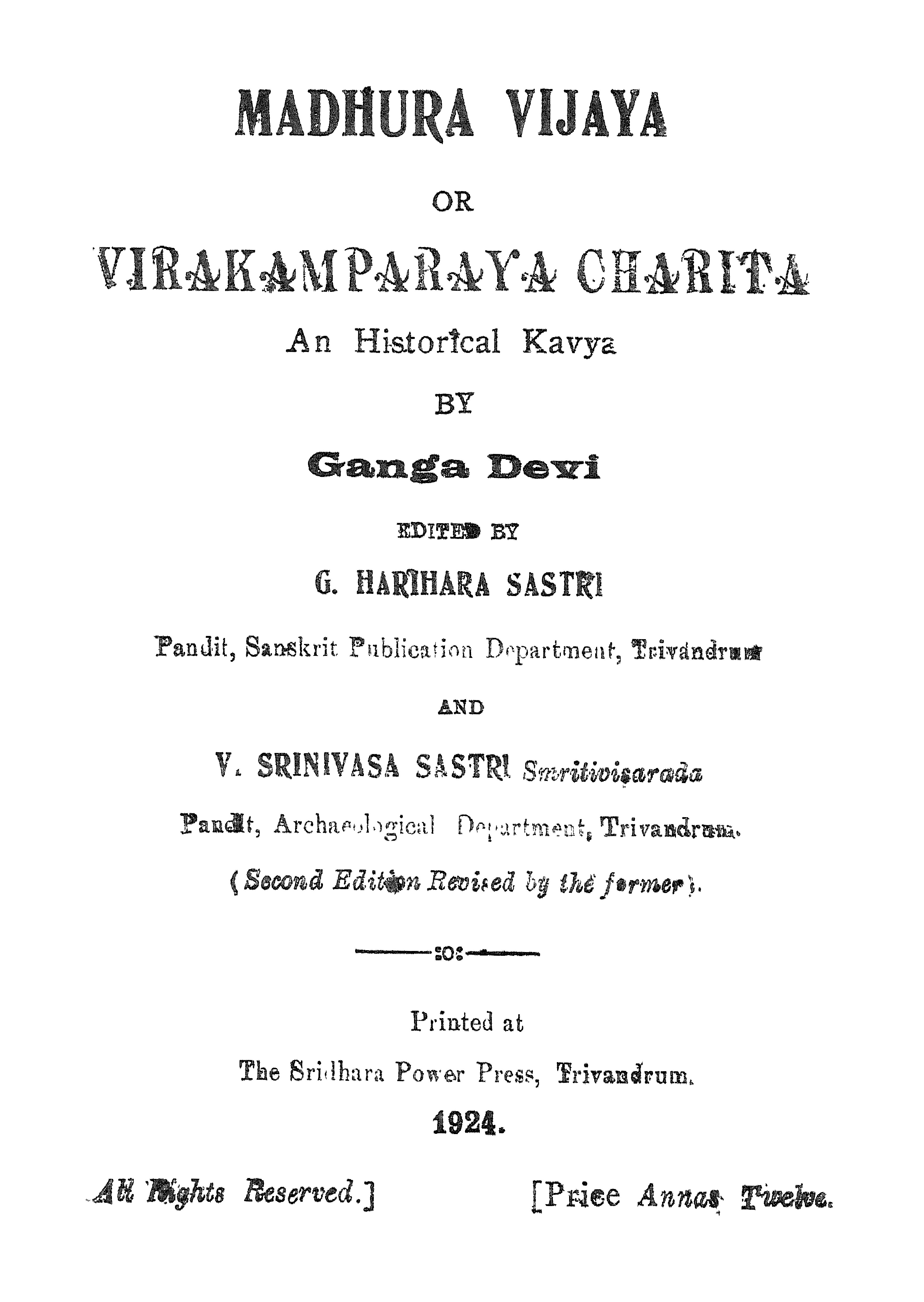
Madhura Vijayam, 1924 edition

Madhurā Vijayam (Sanskrit: मधुराविजयम्), meaning "The Victory of Madurai", is a 14th-century Sanskrit poem written by the poet Gangadevi. It is also named Vira Kamparaya Charitham by the poet. It chronicles the life of Kumara Kampana, a prince of the Vijayanagara Empire and the second son of Bukka Raya I. The poem describes in detail, the conquest of the Madurai Sultanate by the Vijayanagara Empire.

The poem along with Ibn Battuta's memoirs and epigraphical and numismatic records, has been used as a historical source for determining the history of the Madurai Sultanate and the Vijayanagara Empire's conquest of the Sultanate.

== Content ==
Madhura Vijayam (lit. The conquest of Madhura (Madurai)) or Vira Kamparaya Charitham (lit. The history of the brave king Kampa) is a mahākāvya (epic poem) in nine cantos (chapters), though possibly there was an extra canto (now lost) between the eighth and final canto. The available text contains 500-odd verses.

The text from the Madhura Vijayam as translated by Henry Heras describe thus:

Kampanuduaver (Kampana Odeyar), a native of Karnata, having conquered the Muhammadans, took possession of the kingdom. He opened the Siva and Vishnu temples, which had been locked up. He opened the god’s temple at Madura, and obtained a personal view of the god. Things were found precisely as on the day when the temple was shut; the lamp that was lighted on that day, the sandal wood powder, the garland of flowers, and the ornaments usually placed on the morning of festival days, were now found to be exactly as it is usual to find them in the evening of such festival days 4. The general seeing this miracle was glad, struck his eyes, and with great piety made the customary offerings; he gave many villages to the temple and many jewels, and estab- lished ordinances for the regular performance of worship.

M. Krishnamachariar in his History of Classical Sanskrit Literature describes the narrative as consisting of "melodious verses" and summarizes it thus:

the exploits of her husband and narrates the history of his expedition to the south. The city of Vijayanagar with its temple and suburbs are described with all magnificence. Then comes the moving army and its relays on its way to Kāncī, where it is quartered for the winter. Inspired by the exhortation of a Goddess in his dream to extirpate the Mussalmans and to restore the country to its ancient glory, he advances to the South, kills the Sultan of Madura and commemorates his victory by munificent grants to the temples of the country.

In the early chapters, Gangadevi, the wife of Kumara Kampanna II, describes the historical background of the Vijayanagara Empire, the benevolent rule of Bukka I, the birth and early life of Kumara Kampanna. The middle chapters detail the adulthood actions of Kampanna, his south bound invasion and conquest of Kanchipuram. After conquering Kanchipuram and subduing Sambuvaraya chieftain, Kampanna enjoys a brief interlude while consolidating his southern conquests. He is visited by a strange woman (described as the Goddess Meenakshi in disguise) who pleads with him to liberate South India from the rule of the Madurai Sultanate. Heeding her exhortation, Kampanna resumes his invasion of the South. The final chapters chronicle his invasion of Madurai, where he destroys the Muslim armies, slays the last sultan in single combat and restores the temple of Srirangam to its old glory.

== In relation to other works ==
The fact that the Madhura Vijayam refers to the Kṛṣṇa-karṇāmṛta of Līlāśuka, praising him (in verse 1.12) immediately after Daṇḍin and Bhavabhūti, has been used to fix a bound on the date of its author. S. K. De, in History of Sanskrit Literature co-written with S. N. Dasgupta, mentions this poem in the section on poems with historical themes alongside the later Raghunāthābhyudaya of Rāmabhadrāmbā (which is on Raghunatha Nayaka). Again, in the section on the anthologies and women poets, along with the later Tirumalāmbā who wrote the Varadāmbikā-Pariṇaya, he calls Gaṅgādevī a "more gifted" poet, and the poem as "written in a simple style, comparatively free from the pedantry of grammar and rhetoric". Similarly, Dasgupta, in the section on historical kāvyas, mentions it alongside the Hammīra-kāvya.

== Discovery and publication ==
Madhura Vijayam was discovered in 1916 in a private traditional library at Thiruvananthapuram by Pandit N Ramasvami Sastriar. It was found in the form of a single manuscript of sixty-one palm leaves, bound between two other unrelated works. The available poem is made up of nine cantos (chapters) containing 500-odd verses, with some verses incomplete and others missing and presumed lost, including possibly an entire canto between the eighth and final canto.

Though the printed editions have been based on this single manuscript discovered in Trivandrum, the New Catalogus Catalogorum lists three other manuscripts discovered later: two of them are also in Trivandrum, and the third, in Lahore, has even less text (contains only seven cantos).

== In popular culture ==
Salman Rushdie's novel Victory City is framed as a fictional retelling of Madhura Vijayam and the life of Gangadevi.

== Editions ==
- (1916) Madhurāvijayam: or Vīrakamparāya Charitam by Gaṅgādēvī. Edited by Pandit G. Harihara Śāstri and Pandit V. Śrīnivāsa Śāstri, Smṛitviśārada. Printed at the Śrīdhara Press, Trivandrum. (Complete Sanskrit text.)
- (1924) Madhura Vijaya or Virakamparaya Charita: An Historical Kavya by Ganga Devi. Edited by G. Harihara Sastri and V Srinivasa Sastri Smritvisarada. (Second edition revised by the former.) Printed at The Sridhara Power Press, Trivandrum. (Complete Sanskrit text.)
- (1957) Madhurāvijayam of Gangā Dēvi. Edited by S Thiruvenkatachari. Published by Annamalai University. (Sanskrit text with English translation.)
- (1969) Madhurāvijayam. Edited, with a commentary Bhāvaprakāśikā, by Pōtukucci Subrahmaṇyaśāstrī. Published by Ajanta Arts Printers, Kollur, Tenali.
- (2001) Madhurāvijaya Mahākāvyam. Edited with Hindi translation by Dr Sharada Mishra. Published by Shri Sharada Publication and Printing Mart, Patrakar Nagar, Patna. (Sanskrit text with Hindi translation)
- (2010) Madhurāvijayam of Gaṅgādevī: A historical work of 14th Century in Sanskrit (cantos 8 and 9). Edited by K S Kannan. Published by Bangalore University, Bangalore. (Text, translation and detailed notes on eighth and final cantos.)
- (2013) The Conquest of Madhurā: Gaṅgādevī’s Madhurā Vijaya. Translated by Shankar Rajaraman and Venetia Kotamraju. Published by Rasāla Books, Bangalore. ISBN 978-81-924112-2-4. (Ebook ISBN 978-81-924112-3-1.) About 200 of the 500-odd Sanskrit verses are selected, and printed along with translation into English.
