= Madurai Sultanate =

Medieval kingdom based in Madurai (1335–1378)

Sultanate of Ma'bar
- 1335–1378
- Status: Regional Sultanate
- Capital: Madurai
- Official languages: Persian; Hindustani
- Common languages: Tamil
- Religion: Islam (official)
- Government: Absolute monarchy
  - 1335–1339: Jalaluddin Ahsan Khan (first)
  - 1368–1378: Sikandar Shah (last)
- History
  - Established: 1335
  - Disestablished: 1378
Preceded by	Succeeded by
Delhi Sultanate	Vijayanagara Empire
- Today part of: India

The Ma'bar Sultanate, also known as the Madurai Sultanate, was a short lived kingdom based in the city of Madurai in modern-day Tamil Nadu, India. It was dominated by Hindustani-speaking Muslims. The sultanate was proclaimed in 1335 in Madurai, led by Jalaluddin Ahsan Khan, a native of Kaithal in North India, who declared his independence from the Sultanate of Delhi.

Ahsan Khan and his descendants ruled the Madurai Sultanate and surrounding territories until 1378 when the last sultan, Ala-ud-Din Sikandar Shah, was killed in the battle of Madurai by Kumara Kampana, and his forces were defeated by Vijayanagara forces and the Vijayanagara Empire conquered the Sultanate. During this short span of 43 years, the Sultanate had eight different rulers.

== Origins ==
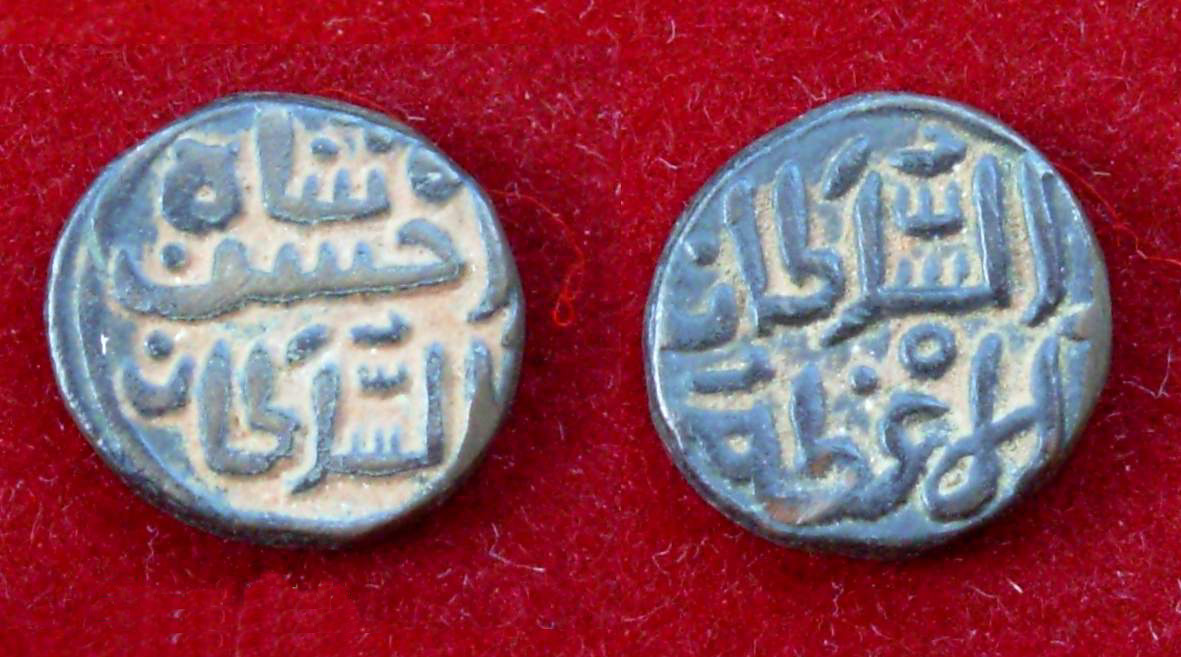
A coin of Jalaluddin Ahsan Khan, the first ruler of the Madurai Sultanate urai

The founder of the Madurai Sultanate, Jalaluddin Ahsan Khan, was called a Sayyid native of Kaithal, while also being called an Afghan.

In 1325 CE, Fakhruddin Jauna Khan acceded to the throne in Delhi as Muhammad bin Tughluq. His plans for invading Iran and Greater Khorasan was destroyed by the bankruptcy of his treasury and led to the issuing of token currency. This led to counterfeiting and further worsened the sultanate's finances. He was unable to pay his huge army and the soldiers stationed in distant provinces revolted. The first province to rebel was Bengal and Ma'bar soon followed and both of them became independent. The ruler of Ma'bar, Jalaluddin Ahsan Khan declared independence from the Delhi Sultanate and set up the Madurai Sultanate. The exact year of founding of the Madurai Sultanate is not clear. Numismatic evidence points to 1335 CE as the founding year. The Iranian historian Firishta however places the year of Ma'bar's revolt as 1340 CE.

This short lived Madurai Sultanate dynasty at Madurai came into existence following the rule of the Pandya dynasty in Tenkasi, and it ruled Madurai, Tiruchirapalli and parts of South Arcot, for the next 43 years, first as feudatories of the Delhi Sultanate and later an independent Sultanate until 1378 CE when the Vijayanagara Empire destroyed and conquered them. The Madurai Sultanate was destroyed and conquered by the Vijayanagara Empire, later followed by the Madurai Nayakas.

A rich merchant from the Madurai Sultanate, Abu Ali (P'aehali 孛哈里), was associated closely with the Madurai Sultanate royal family. After falling out with them, he moved to Yuan China, received an appointment and a Korean woman as his wife; the woman was formerly married to Sangha (桑哥, a Tibetan) and her father was Ch'ae In'gyu (蔡仁揆).

== History ==
=== Jalal-ud-Din Ahsan Khan ===
Jalaluddin Ahsan Khan declared independence from Delhi Sultanate around 1335 CE. His daughter was married to the historian Ibn Battuta and his son Ibrahim was the purse bearer of Muhammad bin Tughluq. When Tughluq heard of Jalaluddin's rebellion he had Ibrahim killed in retaliation. Jalaluddin is variously referred to as "Syed", "Hasan" or "Hussun" by the historians Firishta and Ziauddin Barani. Tughluq tried to conquer the Tamil region, known in Muslim chronicles as Ma'bar back in 1337 CE. But he fell ill at Bidar on the way to Ma'bar and had to return to Deogiri. His army was defeated by Jalaluddin. Jalaluddin was killed by one of his nobles in 1340 CE.

=== Ala-ud-Din Udauji and Qutb-ud-Din Firuz ===
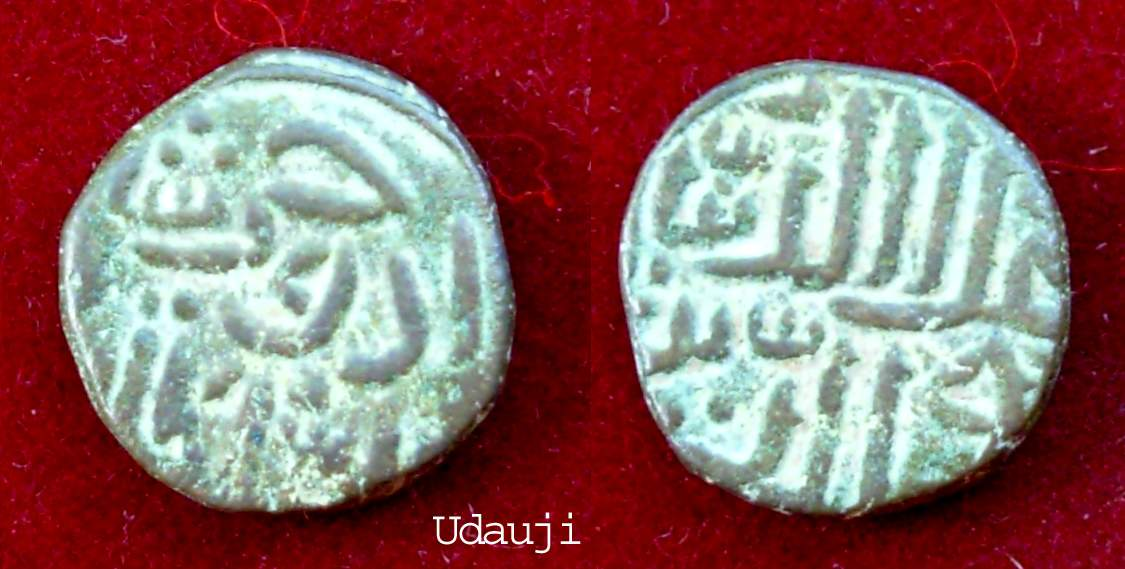
Coin of Ala-ud-Din Udauji, Madurai Sultanate, 1339 AD.

After Jalaluddin's murder, Ala-ud-Din Udauji Shah took power in 1340 CE. He was succeeded by his son in law Qutb-ud-Din Firuz Shah, who in turn was assassinated within forty days of taking power. Qutbuddin's killer Ghiyas-ud-din Dhamagani took over as Sultan in 1340.

=== Ghiyas-ud-Din Muhammad Damghani ===
Ghiyasuddin was defeated by the Hoysala king Veera Ballala III at first, but later managed to capture and kill Ballala in 1343 CE during the siege of Kannanur Koppam. Ghiyasuddin captured Balalla, robbed him of his wealth, had him killed and his stuffed body displayed on the walls of Madurai. Ghiyasuddin died in 1344 CE from the after effects of an aphrodisiac.

==== Ibn Battuta's chronicles ====
During his reign, Ibn Battuta, the Muslim Moroccan explorer known for his extensive travels through Africa, Asia, Europe visited his court while on his way to China. He married Jalaluddin Ahsan Khan's daughter. His travel notes mention Ghiyas-ud-Din Muhammad Damghani's atrocious behaviour towards the local population. His army under his personal orders had the habit of frequently rounding up the local Hindu villagers, indiscriminately impaling them on sharpened wooden spikes and leaving them to die. These accounts of were published in a travelogue that has come to be known as The Rihla (lit. "The Journey"). This history is also displayed in the Ibn Battuta Mall, Dubai, United Arab Emirates.

=== Nasir-ud-Din Mahmud Damghan Shah ===
Ghiyasuddin was succeeded by his nephew Nasir-ud-Din Mahmud Damghan Shah, reportedly a soldier who originated from Delhi. He fled Hindustan and joined his uncle in Madurai. He upon ascension quickly started dismissing and killing many of the officers and nobles and various political enemies who were likely to disturb his possession of the throne. He too fell into decline and was killed in a short time.

== Persecution of Hindus ==
From contemporary historical accounts, the rulers of Madurai Sultanate come across as tyrants and persecutors of Hindus. Both Ibn Batutta's and Gangadevi's accounts contain graphic descriptions of atrocities committed by the Sultans on the Hindu population.

Ibn Batuta describes Ghiyasuddin Dhamgani's actions as:

the Hindu prisoners were divided into four sections and taken to each of the four gates of the great catcar. There, on the stakes they had carried, the prisoners were impaled. Afterwards their wives were killed and tied by their hair to these pales. Little children were massacred on the bosoms of their mothers and their corpses left there. Then, the camp was razed, and they started cutting down the trees of another forest. In the same manner did they treat their later Hindu prisoners. This is shameful conduct such as I have not known any other sovereign guilty of. It is for this that God hastened the death of Ghiyasuddin.

One day whilst the Qazi and I were having our food with (Ghiyasuddin), the Qazi to his right and I to his left, an infidel was brought before him accompanied by his wife and son aged seven years. The Sultan made a sign with his hand to the executioners to cut off the head of this man; then he said to them in Arabic: 'and the son and the wife.' They cut off their heads and I turned my eyes away. When I looked again, I saw their heads lying on the ground.

I was another time with the Sultan Ghiyasuddin when a Hindu was brought into his presence. He uttered words I did not understand, and immediately several of his followers drew their daggers. I rose hurriedly, and he said to me; 'Where are you going' ? I replied: 'I am going to say my afternoon (4 o'clock) prayers.' He understood my reason, smiled, and ordered the hands and feet of the idolater to be cut off. On my return I found the unfortunate swimming in his blood.

— Ibn Battuta, The Rihla, Page 236

Gangadevi's Madhura Vijayam declares the Madurai Sultanate's rule to be the pain to the three worlds:

O mighty and brave king! Go forth then, and without further delay, uproot from my lands, this Kingdom of the Turushkas, the pain to the three worlds. Go forth my dear king, and securing your victory, establish one hundred victory pillars in middle of the famed Ramasetu!

— Gangadevi, Madhura Vijayam, A portion from the Madhura Vijayam

On the condition of Madurai under the Madurai Sultanate's rule, Gangadevi writes:

I very much lament for what has happened to the groves in Madurai. The coconut trees have all been cut and in their place are to be seen rows of iron spikes with human skulls dangling at the points.

In the highways which were once charming with the sounds of anklets of beautiful women, are now heard the ear-piercing noises of Brahmanas being dragged, bound in iron fetters and then beheaded.

The waters of Tambraparni which were once white with sandal paste rubbed away from the breasts of charming girls are now flowing red with the blood of cattle slaughtered by the Turushka miscreants.

— Gangadevi, Madhura Vijayam, Chattopadhyaya

Ibn Batuta describes a plague afflicting Madurai:

When I arrived at Madurai, there was a contagious disease prevalent there which killed people in a short time. Those who were attacked died in two or three days. If their death was delayed, it was only until the fourth day, that they died. On leaving my dwelling, I saw people either sick and then dead or already dead.

— Ibn Battuta, The Rihla, Page 240

Gangadevi agrees with the Ibn Battuta on the prevalence of unnatural death by plague:

Yama takes his undue toll of death on what are left of the lives if undestroyed by the Turushkas.

— Gangadevi, Madhura Vijayam, Chattopadhyaya

== Decline ==
Between 1344 CE and 1357 CE, the Madurai Sultanate went into a decline due to infighting and the conquest of the Madurai Sultanate by the Vijayanagara Empire in the North and South, East and West. This is inferred by the lack of any coinage issued during this period. However coins from 1358 CE to 1378 CE bearing the names of three Madurai Sultans – Shams-ud-Din Adil Shah, Fakhr-ud-Din Mubarak Shah and Ala-ud-Din Sikandar Shah – have been found. This indicates a destruction of the Madurai Sultanate's power during 1344 CE – 1357 CE and a brief revival and destruction during 1357 CE – 1378 CE.

=== Conquest of Madurai Sultanate by the Vijayanagara Empire ===
The Vijayanagara Empire under the rule of Bukka Raya I conquered nearly the entirety of South India. A series of Vijayanagaran invasions in the mid-14th century CE succeeded in conquering the Madurai Sultanate. Vijayanagar's armies were led by Bukka Raya I's son, Kumara Kampana of Nayaka clan. Kumara Kampana and his forces first destroyed and conquered the Sambuvarayar dynasty in present-day Kanchipuram district, then an ally of Tughlaq dynasty who refused to do the Madurai Sultanate's destruction and conquest and then conquered and destroyed the entire Madurai Sultanate. Bowman states that the Madurai Sultanate was conquered and destroyed by Kumara Kampana and his forces in 1370 CE. Kampana and his forces's conquest and destruction of the entire Madurai Sultanate has been chronicled in the Sanskrit epic poem Madhura Vijayam ("The Victory of Madurai"), written by Kumara Kampana's wife Gangadevi. Kumara Kampana and his forces's conquest and destruction of the entire Madurai Sultanate is celebrated by the restoration of the Srirangam Ranganatha Ranganayaki Temple to its all glory in 1371 CE. Vijayanagara formally made Madurai to be its possession during Harihara II's rule in 1378 CE. It is known that the arrival of Nayakas has changed the course of Madurai's history there by conquering entire South India and destroying and conquering the entire Madurai Sultanate.

== List of sultans of Madurai ==
Titular name	Personal name	Reign
Independence from Tughlaq dynasty of Delhi Sultanate.
Jalal-ud-din Shah جلال الدین شاہ	Jalaluddin Ahsan Khan	1335 CE – 1339 CE
Ala-ud-din Shah علاء الدین شاہ	Ala-ud-din Udauji Shah	1339 CE
Qutb-ud-din Shah قطب الدین شاہ	Qutb-ud-Din Firuz Shah	1339 CE – 1340 CE
Ghiyath-ud-din Shah غیاث الدین شاہ	Ghiyas-ud-Din Muhammad Damghani	1340 CE – 1344 CE
Nasir-ud-din Shah ناصر الدین شاہ	Nadir-ud-Din Mahmud Damghani	1344 CE – 1345 CE
Shams-ud-din Shah شمس الدین شاہ	Shams-ud-Din Adil Shah	1356 CE – 1358 CE
Fakhr-ud-din Shah فخرالدین شاہ	Fakhr-ud-Din Mubarak Shah	1358 CE – 1368 CE
Ala-ud-din Shah II علاء الدین شاہ	Ala-ud-Din Sikandar Shah	1368 CE – 1378 CE
Destroyed and conquered by Vijayanagara Empire's Sangama dynasty

== Gallery ==
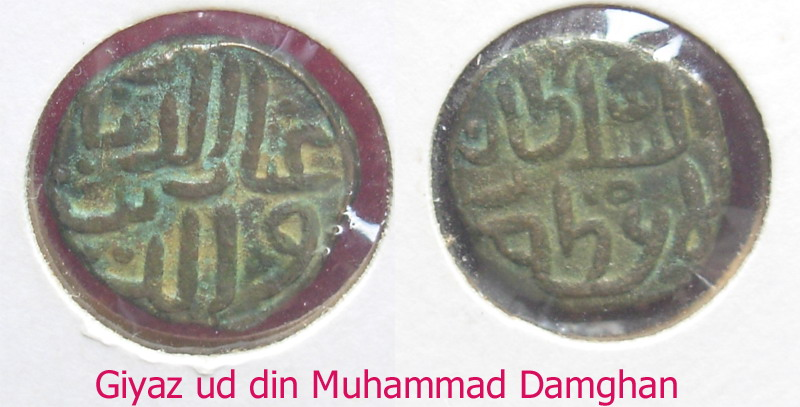
A copper coin of Muhammad Damghani.

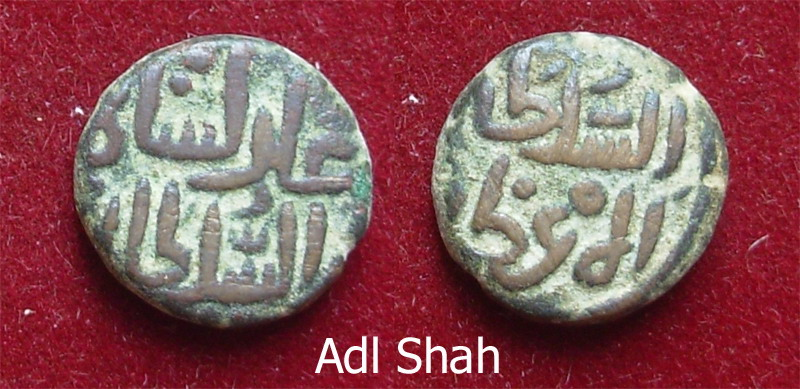
A copper coin of Adil Shah.

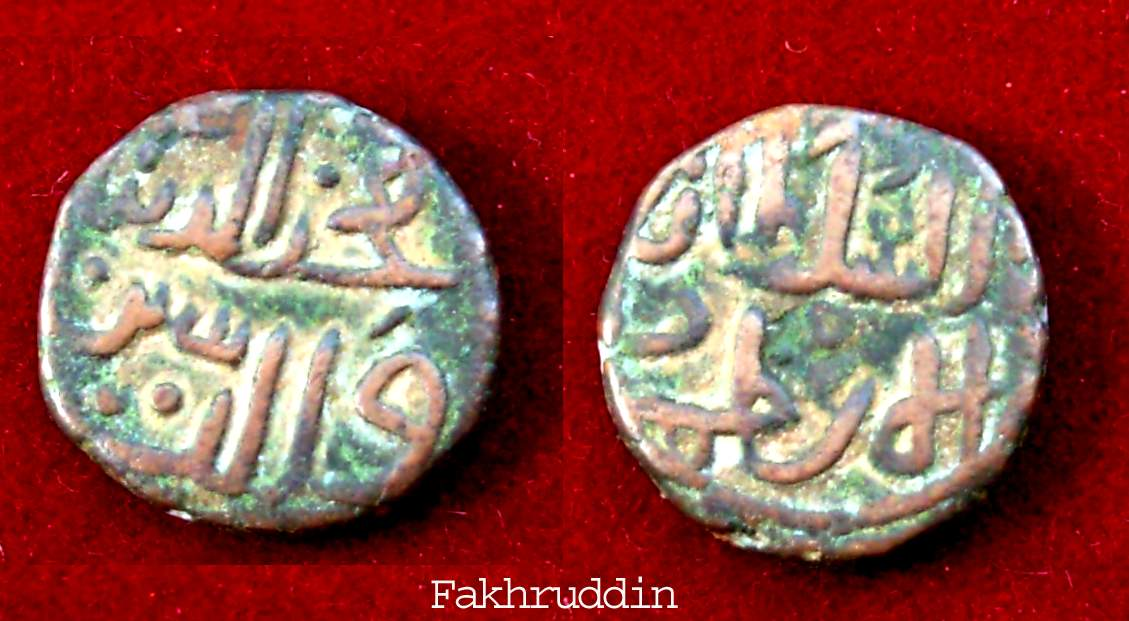
A copper coin of Fakhr-ud-Din Mubarak Shah, the Sultan of the Madurai Sultanate, 1358 CE – 1368 CE.

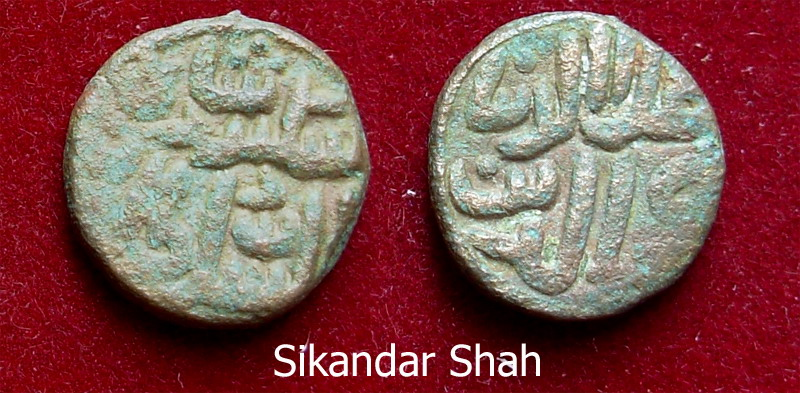
A copper coin of Sikandar Shah, the last Sultan of the Madurai Sultanate when he was killed and beheaded by Kumara Kampana and his forces killed by Vijayanagara forces when the entire Madurai Sultanate was conquered and destroyed by the Vijayanagara Empire in the battle of Madurai, 1378 CE.

== See also ==
- Kumara Kampana
- Vijayanagar Empire

== Bibliography ==
- Aiyangar, S. Krishnaswami (1921). South India and Her Muhammadan Invaders. Asian Educational Services, Oxford University Press. ISBN 978-81-206-0536-7. Archived from the original on 22 November 2020.
- Lee, Samuel (1829). "On the Malabar Coast". Quoted in "Selections from the Travels of Ibn Batuta". Oriental Translation Committee. ISBN 1605206210.
- Majumdar, R.C., ed. (2006), The Delhi Sultanate, Mumbai: Bharatiya Vidya Bhavan
- Nilakanta Sastri, Kallidaikurichi Aiyah Aiyar (1958) [1955], A History of South India: From Prehistoric Times to the Fall of Vijayanagar (Paperback ed.), Madras: Oxford University Press, Amen HouseLondon
- Chattopadhyaya, Brajadulal (2006), Studying Early India: Archaeology, Texts and Historical Issues, Anthem Press, ISBN 978-1-84331-132-4
