= Bukka Raya I =

Emperor of Vijayanagara from 1356 to 1377

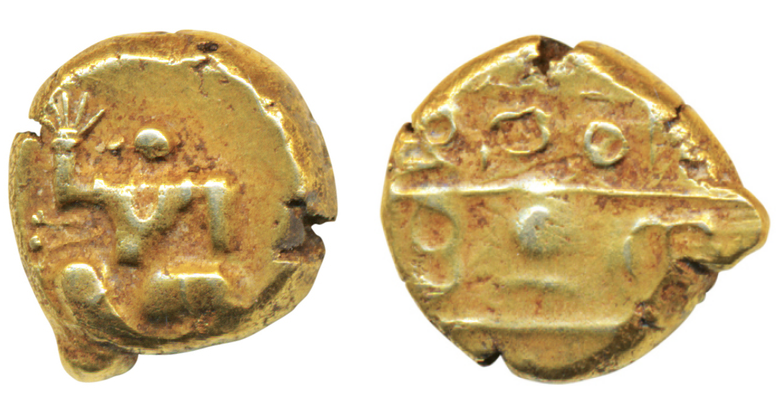
- Pagoda of Bukka Raya I

Vijayanagara Emperor
- Reign: January/February 1356 – 24 February 1377
- Predecessor: Harihara I
- Successor: Harihara II
- Born: between 1300 and 1310
- Died: 24 February 1377; Vijayanagar, Vijayanagara Empire (modern day Hampi, Karnataka, India)
- Issue: Kumara Kampana Harihara II
- House: Sangama
- Father: Bhavana Sangama
- Mother: Maravve Nayakiti
- Religion: Hinduism (until 1323; 1334–1377); Sunni Islam (1323–1334)

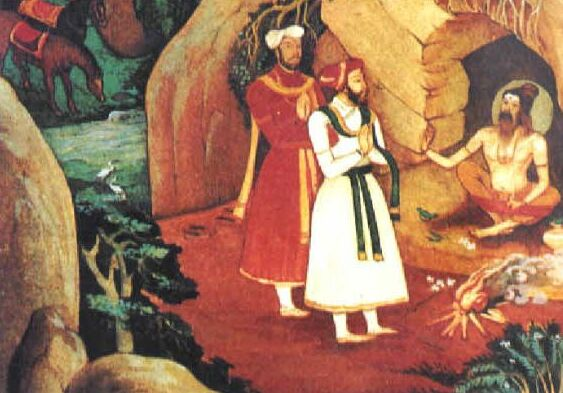
Harihara and Bukka meeting Vidyaranya

Bukka Raya I (reigned 1356–24 February 1377) was an emperor of the Vijayanagara Empire from the Sangama Dynasty. He was a son of Bhavana Sangama.

== Background ==
The early life of Bukka as well as his brother Hakka (also known as Harihara I) are relatively unknown and most accounts of their early life are based on various theories (see the Vijayanagara Empire article for more extended descriptions of these). The Father Heras theory states that Sangama brothers had a great devotion to the Karnataka deities like Virupaksha and Keshava. They signed only in Kannada letters like "Sri Virupaksha" in Sanskrit, Telugu, and Tamil records. Dr. Desai quotes that Ferishta called the emperors as "Roise of Carnatic". Carnatic means "Karnataka" hence shows their origin from Karnataka.

The second theory states that Bukka and Hakka were commanders in the army of the Kakatiya King of Warangal. After the King of Warangal was defeated by Muhammad bin Tughlaq, Bukka and his brother were taken prisoners and sent to Delhi, where they both converted to Islam. Bukka and his brother eventually escaped, reconverted to Hinduism under the influence of the sage Vidyaranya, and founded the Vijayanagara Empire.

== Reign ==
Under Bukka Raya's 21-year reign (37, according to Nuniz) the kingdom prospered and continued to expand as Bukka Raya conquered most of the kingdoms of southern India, continually expanding the territory of the empire. He defeated the Shambuvaraya Kingdom of Arcot and the Reddis of Kondavidu by 1360 and the region around Penukonda was annexed. Bukka defeated the Sultanate of Madurai in 1371 and extended his territory into the south all the way to Rameswaram. His son, Kumara Kampana, campaigned with him and their efforts were recorded in the Sanskrit work Madura Vijayam(also known as Veerakamparaya Charitram) written by his wife Gangambika. By 1374 he had gained an upper hand over the Bahmanis for control of the Tungabhadra-Krishna doab and also took control of Goa, a small portion the kingdom of Eastern Ganga Dynasty of Odisha (Orya) were also captured and Bukka forced the Jaffna kingdom of Ceylon and the Zamorins of Malabar to pay tributes to him.

== Clashes ==
During his reign Bukka would also have clashes with the Bahmani Sultans. The first was during the time of Mohammed Shah I and the other during the time of Mujahid Shah. It is said that Bukka also sent a mission to China during his reign. Bukka died in about 1380 and was succeeded by Harihara II. It is also notable that under Bukka Raya's reign the capital of the Vijayanagara Empire established itself at Vijayanagara, on the south side of the river, which was more secure and defensive than their previous capital at Anegondi.

== Cultural and welfare activities ==
Even with the wars and internal conflicts, Bukka still managed to help support internal improvements for the city. Important works of literature were also written during his rule. He appointed the famous Telugu poet Nachana Soma as his court poet. Dozens of scholars lived under the guidance of Vidyaranya and Sayana.

Under the patronage of Bukka and other early Vijayanagar kings, a group of scholars headed by Sayana produced commentaries on the Samhitas of the four Vedas, and several of the Brahmanas and Aranyakas.

Preceded by Harihara I	Vijayanagar empire 1356–1377	Succeeded by Harihara II
