= Kumara Kampana =

Vijayanagar prince and general

- Died: 1374
- Father: Bukka Raya I
- Military career
- Allegiance: Vijayanagara Empire
- Conflicts: See list: Madurai (1365–70)

Kumara Kampanna (died 1374), also known as Kampanna and Veerakamparaya, was an army commander and the prince in the Vijayanagara Empire. He was the son of king Bukka I. Kumara Kampanna led the successful invasion of the Madurai Sultanate. His exploits form the subject of the Sanskrit epic poem Madhura Vijayam written by his wife Gangadevi.

According to the poetic legend, it was Ganga Devi who gave Kumara Kampanna the goddess' sword to fight and liberate Madurai from the Sultanate, reopen the Meenakshi Temple, and "to undertake the righting of vast wrongs", states William Jackson.

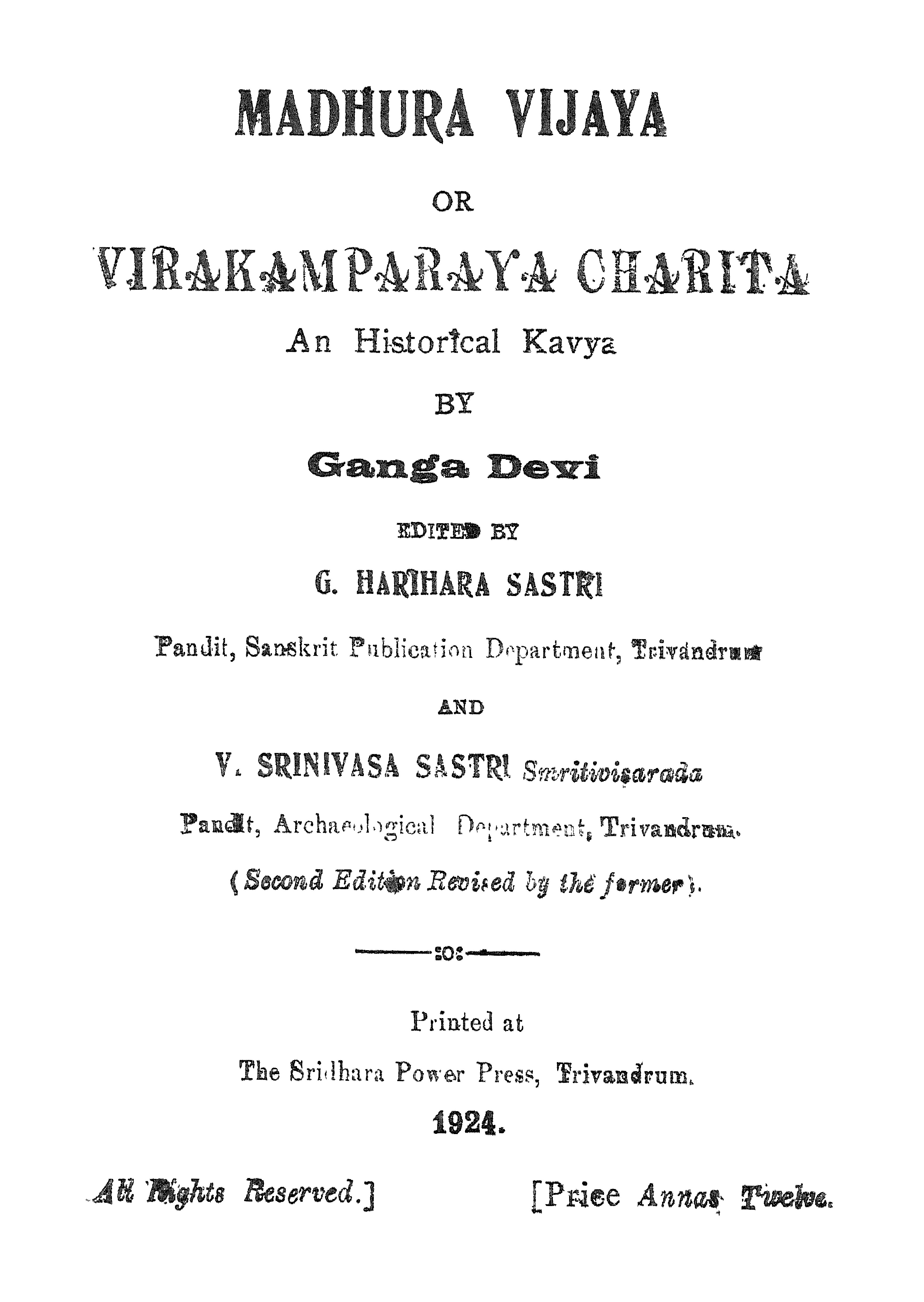
Madura Vijayam 1924 Edition
