= Battle of Kauthal =

1366 Bahmani victory during the First Bahmani–Vijayanagar War

- Part of the First Bahmani–Vijayanagar War
Date	23 July 1366
Location	Kauthal, near Adoni 15°36′00″N 77°00′00″E
Result	Bahmani victory

Belligerents
Bahmani Kingdom	Vijayanagara Empire

Commanders and leaders
Mohammed Shah I; Khan Muhammed †; Isa Khan †	Bukka Raya I; Mallinatha (DOW)

Strength
65,000 • 50,000 infantry • 15,000 cavalry	540,000 (likely exaggerated) • 500,000 infantry • 40,000 cavalry
- Location of the battle within India

The Battle of Kauthal, also known as the Battle of Adoni, took place on 23 July 1366 between the Bahmani Kingdom and the Vijayanagara Empire. The battle is notable for being the first time firearms were used in battle in India.

== Background ==
After the decline of the Hoysala dynasty in South India following the death of Veera Ballala III, who was defeated by the Madurai Sultanate in the Battle of Kannanur, the state was succeeded by some of his officers. Among them, the most prominent were two brothers named Harihara I and Bukka Raya I, who founded the Vijayanagara Empire in 1336.

Meanwhile, the Bahmanis had obtained independence in 1347 after a rebellion by Bahman Shah and Ismail Mukh, two Deccani nobles. When Firuz Shah Tughlaq of Delhi Sultanate announced that he would not endeavour to bring the South back under the rule of Delhi, Vijayanagara and the Bahmanis, relieved of this concern, were able to engage in hostilities independently.

Following the demise of Alauddin Bahman Shah, his son Mohammed Shah I succeeded to the throne of the Bahmani Sultanate. During his reign, the first conflict between the Bahmanis and Vijayanagar commenced in 1362. The conflict erupted as a result of the Bahmanis refusing to hand over the fortress of Kaulas to the Musunuri Nayakas, which led Vijayanagara to ally with the Nayakas.

== Prelude ==
In 1366, Mohammed Shah, displeased with Vijayanagara's behavior, and with the issues regarding Kanhayya resolved, opted to launch an attack on Vijayanagara. Bukka Raya declared war on the Bahmanis, crossed the Tungabhadra, and captured the Mudgal fort, which was garrisoned by eight thousand people. Bukka Raya ordered the killing of everyone there, including men, women and children, sparing only one person to escape and narrate the story to the Bahmani Sultan. Disturbed by the report, the Sultan proclaimed his son, Mujahid, as the heir to the throne and granted his minister, Malik Saifuddin Ghori, full authority over the country and treasury. He then marched with his army and crossed the river Krishna. The following day, he moved his army four miles from the camp, but heavy rainfall overnight turned the ground boggy, impeding the movement of the Vijayanagar army. Upon realizing the disadvantage and upon seeing the Sultan, Bukka offered no resistance and fled with some selected troops towards the fortress of Adoni, leaving everything behind. Bukka left the fort, entrusting it to his sister's son. Muhammad Shah, with his army, entered the fort and recaptured Mudgal.

Upon reaching the fort of Adoni, Bukka immediately began preparing for war. He dispatched his general Mallinatha to confront the Bahmanis. On 23 July, Mohammed Shah crossed the Tungabhadra and reached Siruguppa with around 50,000 infantry and 15,000 cavalry. Meanwhile, Mallinatha commanded around 500,000 infantry and 40,000 cavalry.

== Battle ==
Mohammed Shah put his general Isa Khan in charge of the left flank, while Khan Muhammad, also known as Musa Khan, commanded the center. Fighting broke out at dawn, and both sides took heavy casualties. During the fighting, Isa Khan and Musa Khan were killed by musket balls. After the deaths of the two Bahmani generals, it seemed that the Bahmani army was about to retreat. However, Mohammed Shah arrived with a crucial reinforcement of 3,000 cavalry, turning the battle in favor of the Bahmanis. Khan Muhammad's elephant, named Sher-i Shikar, charged at Mallinatha, mortally wounding him. This led him to flee, which made Vijayanagara's army retreat.

== Aftermath ==
After the battle, Bukka Raya was forced to start the retreat back to the capital, as starting another pitched battle with the Bahmanis would have cut him off from the capital. Bukka was forced to retreat via the woods, as the main roads were blocked by refugees and the Bahmanis. Mohammed Shah closely followed Bukka for 3 months, and laid siege to Vijayanagara.

For a month, the city was under siege, but Mohammed Shah was unable to capture it. Bukka Raya marched out of the city and engaged in battle, but was defeated and retreated back to the capital. Mohammed Shah, realizing this victory could not end the war, ravaged the countryside until Bukka Raya agreed to a peace treaty. The region's population did not fully recover for decades.
