= Bahmani–Vijayanagar War (1398) =

Fourteenth century war between Bahmanis and Vijayanagar

Bahmani–Vijayanagara War (1398)
- Part of Bahmani–Vijayanagar Wars
- Krishna River Basin
Date	1398
Location	Krishna River, Raichur, Vijayanagar
Result	Bahmani victory
Territorial changes	Vijayanagar expansion halted

Belligerents
Bahmani Sultanate; Velama chiefs of Telangana	Vijayanagara Empire

Commanders and leaders
Taj ud-Din Firuz Shah; Ahmad Shah I Wali; Devraj Ghorpade; Qazi Sirajuddin; Malik Na'ib	Harihara II; Prince Bukka X

Strength
Numerically Inferior; 12,000 Cavalry	Numerically Superior; Main army (Exaggerated); 900,000 Men; 30,000 Cavalry; Against Velama Chiefs; 80,000 Cavalry; Unknown Musketeers

Casualties and losses
Unknown	Heavy

The Bahmani–Vijayanagar War (1398) of 1398 marked the military conflicts between the Bahmani Sultanate under Tajuddin Firuz Shah and the Vijayanagar empire under Harihara II. After the initial Bahmani-Vijayanagar War in 1367, the two kingdoms enjoyed a period of peace for thirty years. However, in the late fourteenth century, they once again found themselves engaged in major warfare in the Deccan region.

The war was ignited by the invasion of Raichur by Prince Bukka and Harihara II, who capitalized on the internal conflicts within the Bahmani Sultanate's northern region. Firuz Shah faced a significant disadvantage as most of his army was deployed in the north. A flood in the Krishna River further complicated matters, separating the two armies on opposite banks.

Seizing the opportunity, Qazi Sirajuddin, a Bahmani officer, infiltrated the Vijayanagar camp as an assassin, assassinating the Prince and causing chaos. Exploiting the ensuing disorder, Firuz Shah launched an attack on Vijayanagar, compelling Harihara to surrender under pressure from the Brahmins, whose families had been enslaved by the Bahmanis. The Bahmanis withdrew after recapturing the Raichur Doab and receiving a ransom of 1 million Hunas. Harihara had to pay an annual tribute of 3.3 million Tankas to the Bahmanis.

== Background ==
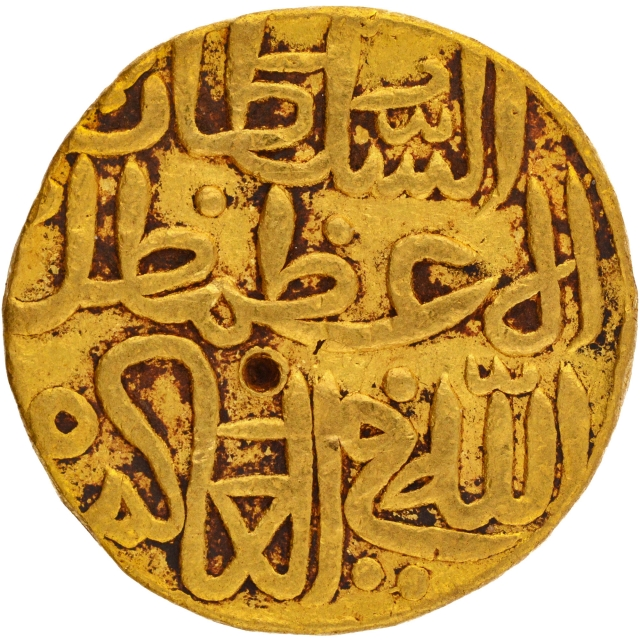
Bahmani coins issued during the reign of Mujahid Shah

After the Bahmani-Vijayanagar war of 1367, Mujahid Shah, the son of Mohammed Shah I, initiated a campaign against the Vijayanagara Empire. He demanded large tracts of land from Bukka Raya, the Vijayanagara emperor. However, Bukka refused to concede, leading to military conflicts between the two sides. Mujahid marched against Bukka, who avoided direct confrontation for six months and took refuge within his capital. After some successes, the Bahmanis ultimately withdrew with a substantial number of prisoners. They later besieged Adoni but, eventually, peace negotiations were reached. Following this, the Bahmanis returned to their capital.

After this campaign, Mujahid was assassinated by his uncle Daud Shah, who then ascended to the throne. Meanwhile, Bukka Raya had also died and was succeeded by his son Harihara II. Upon Daud's death, a faction at the court aimed to install Daud's infant son, Muhammad Sanjar, as the ruler. However, the child was under the custody of Ruh Parwar, who had him blinded, thwarting the plan to place him on the throne. Supporters of Ruh Parwar then offered the throne to Prince Muhammad, a son of Mahmud Khan, a younger son of Ala-ud-Din Bahman Shah. Upon ascending the throne, Muhammad Khan assumed the title of Muhammad Shah II. Mohammed Shah II, was inclined towards peace and did not pursue warfare. Instead, he became a prominent patron of literature and science. During his reign, there were no wars between the Bahmanis and Vijayanagar.

Muhammad Shah II was known for his peaceful and benevolent rule, prioritizing the welfare of his people. He constructed mosques and schools and welcomed scholars from various parts of Asia. Due to his profound knowledge, he earned the nickname "Aristotle." During a severe famine lasting eight years (1387-1395 A.D.), the Sultan swiftly organized relief efforts and established numerous orphanages to aid those in need. He died in 1397. His son-in-law, Firuz Shah, succeeded to the throne after Muhammad Shah II. The Bahmanis resumed their war with Vijayanagar during the reign of Firuz Shah.

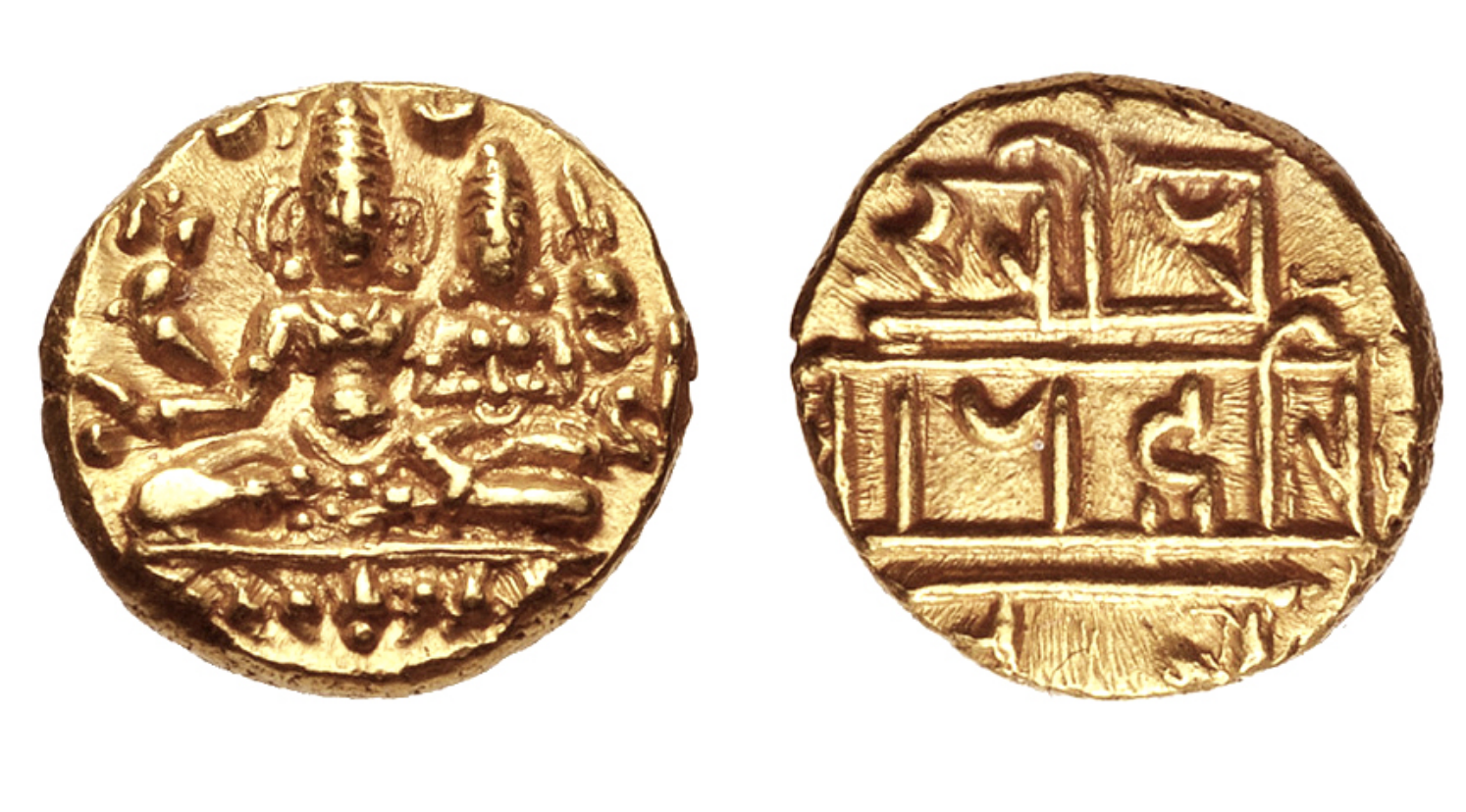
Coin of Harihara II

== Initial attacks ==
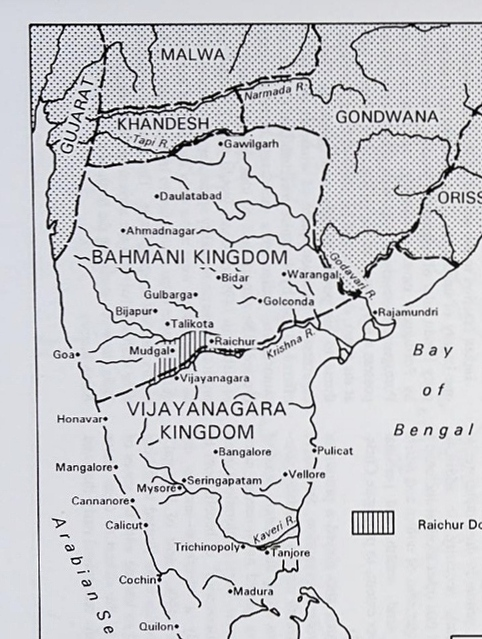
The Raichur Doab

During the reign of Muhammad Shah II, there were no major wars between the Bahmanis and Vijayanagar. However, there were occasional skirmishes, notably at Goa, Adoni, and Kothakonda. In 1395, the Vijayanagara general Cheneppa captured a place called Rangini in Andhra Pradesh. Despite these minor conflicts, overall relations between the Bahmanis and Vijayanagar remained peaceful during this period. Right after Firuz Shah's ascension to the throne, in 1398, he confronted a rebellion at Sagara, followed by another rebellion led by Narasimha of Kherla, with support from the Malwa Sultanate and Khandesh. Firuz Shah successfully suppressed the rebellion at Sagar, with assistance from certain Hindu chiefs, most notably Bhairon Singh, who was the progenitor of the Kingdom of Mudhol.

Taking advantage of the internal struggles faced by the Bahmanis, Harihara II decided to secure his flank by persuading Katya Vema of Rajamundry to join forces with him. He then launched an attack on the Raichur Doab in a fanlike movement, simultaneously covering Mudgal, Raichur, and other strategic locations. The combined army of Harihara was believed to have consisted of 30,000 cavalry and 900,000 men. This figure is considered by Eraly as an exaggeration, but he still considered the Vijayanagar army as having overwhelmingly outnumbered the Bahmanis. Meanwhile, Prince Bukka II of Vijayanagar, with 80,000 cavalry and additional forces of Musketeers, subdued the Velama chiefs of Telangana, who had a treaty relationship with the Bahmanis. While Firuz Shah's main army was defending the Raichur Doab, the Telangana army of Vijayanagar faced little difficulty in defeating their opponents. The rebellion at Kherla diverted Firuz Shah's attention, prompting him to send a large number of troops to the north. Additionally, a flood occurred in the Krishna River due to the rainy season, preventing either army from crossing it.

=== Assassination of Prince Bukka ===
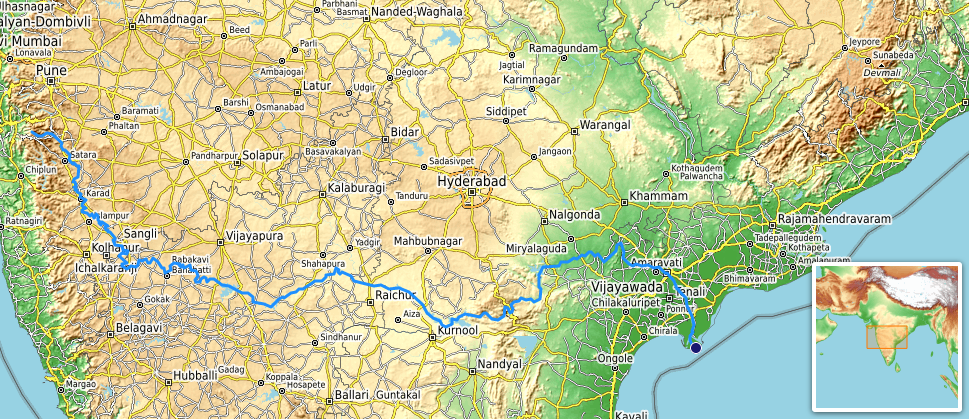
The Krishna River

Firuz Shah, with no more than 12,000 cavalry, dared to advance towards the Krishna river. The discipline and tactics of the Vijayanagar army were deemed contemptible. They were spread out over an area extending some seventeen miles along the riverbank and the same distance south of it. This dispersion, necessary for supply purposes, undermined their cohesion. However, their sheer numbers made it impossible to attempt to cross the river. Firuz grew increasingly frustrated by his enforced inaction, which eventually took a toll on his health. During this time, an officer of the Bahmani named Qazi Sirajuddin, though initially appointed for his judicial duties, displayed more prowess in military matters. He suggested a bold plan to Firuz Shah, which the latter initially forbade but later approved. Qazi Sirajuddin, a man of various talents, had acquired proficiency in music, dancing, and juggling during his youth. He proposed crossing the river with a small band of performers who could easily gain entry into the disorderly camp of the enemy. By assassinating either Harihara or his son, they could sow chaos and provide an opportunity for the Bahmani army to cross under the cover of darkness.

He and his small group crossed the river disguised as beggars and gained admission to the house of a female singer who regularly performed at the Vijayanagara camp in the evenings. The disguised individuals asked the girl if they could accompany her, claiming to be skilled in music and song. They performed admirably, delighting the audience with their singing and musical interludes. The Qazi sent a secret message to Firuz, warning him to be prepared, and led his troupe to the prince's tents. Only the Qazi and two others were required to perform the dance, while the rest of the party remained outside, ready to facilitate their escape. After showcasing some tricks, Sirajuddin called for weapons to perform the sword and dagger dance. The three performers then amazed the partially intoxicated Vijayanagar with their swordplay. Suddenly, Sirajuddin rushed forward and struck down the prince, while his two confederates dealt with the minister, other spectators, and torch-bearers. The trio then escaped into the darkness and rejoined their companions outside. Meanwhile, upon the first signs of disturbance, their companions had attacked and killed the same guards, allowing the entire group to flee to safety and await the outcome of their mission.

The Vijayanagar camp was thrown into chaos, with wild rumors spreading. Many believed that the enemy had crossed the river in force and killed the prince. In the darkness, some Vijayanagaris mistook others for enemies and attacked them. The confusion only ended when a fire, ignited by some burning tents, revealed the mistake to the combatants. Some stood ready to fight by their tents, unsure of whom to strike.

== Final conflicts ==
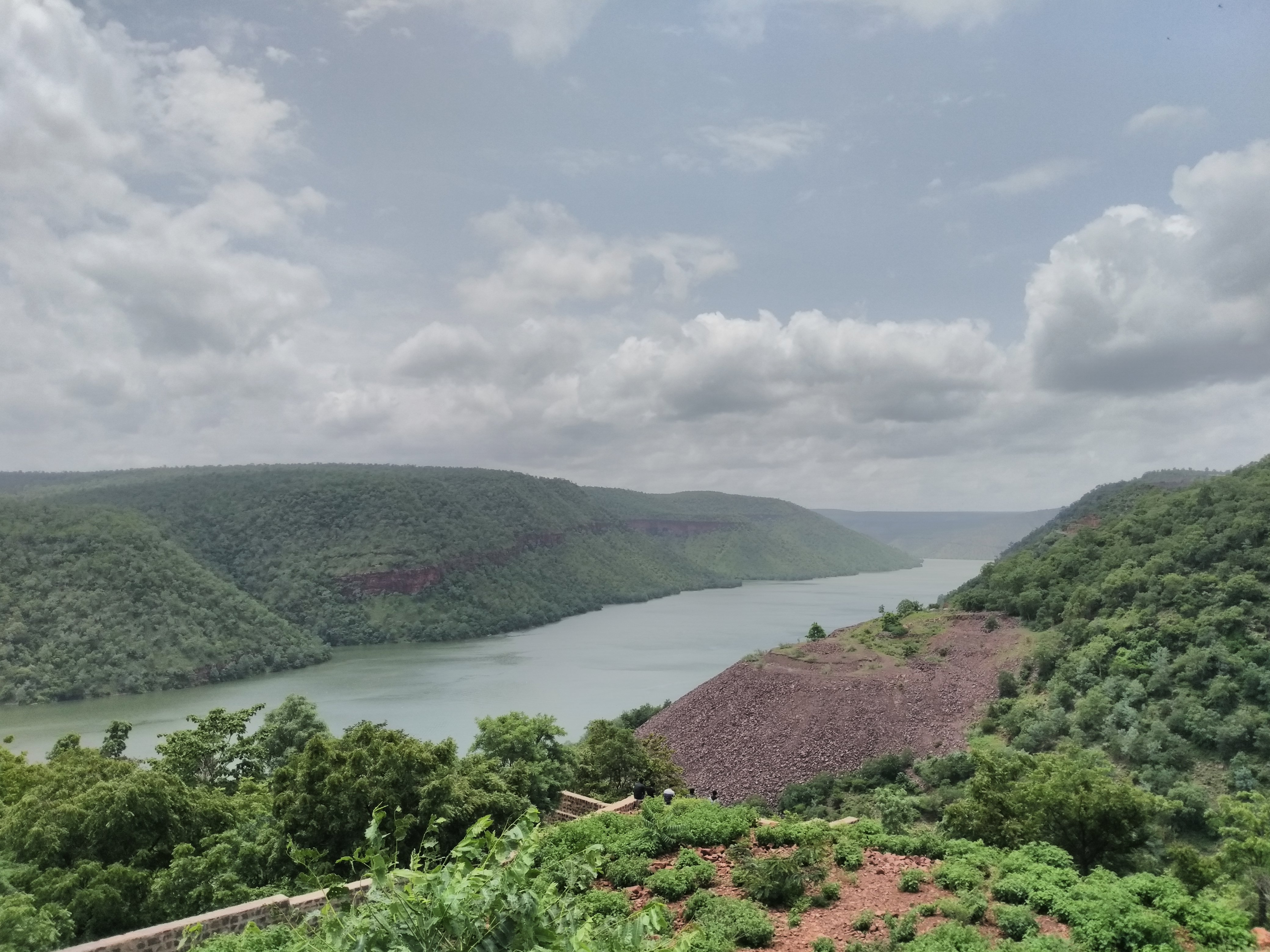
Krishna River today

While the quarrels were ongoing, a Bahmani force of four thousand men arrived on the scene and engaged the Vijayanagar army, forcing them to flee. The following morning, Firuz himself arrived at the scene, and the Vijayanagar king Harihara was compelled to retreat to his dominions. The southern bank was captured by the Bahmanis. Harihara retreated, carrying the dead body of his son, leaving his army behind. Firuz pursued Harihara with a small force and halted his advance before reaching Vijayanagar.

Despite the numerical weakness of his army, Firuz chose not to besiege Vijayanagar. Respecting the treaty signed between Mohammad Shah I and Bukka Raya I after the first war of 1367, the lives of non-combatants were spared. However Ahmad Shah, the brother of Firuz Shah, captured a significant number of people, including ten thousand Brahmins, were enslaved.

The relatives of these Brahmins in the city pleaded with Harihar to offer ransom for their release. Harihara II then laid down his arms and entered into negotiations with the Malik Na'ib, who had returned after devastating the southern provinces. A treaty was drafted, stipulating that the Bahmani Sultan would release all the prisoners captured, and in return, Harihara would pay ten lacs of huns into the royal treasury. Additionally, the Malik Na'ib would receive a present of a lac of huns for successfully concluding the negotiations. After appointing Faulad Khan, son of Safder Khan Sistani, as the Governor of the Raichur Doab, Firuz returned home. The emperor of Vijayanagara had to pay thirty-three lakhs of tankas annually to the Bahmanis as a result of this campaign.
