= 1366 =

1366 in various calendars
- Gregorian calendar: 1366; MCCCLXVI
- Ab urbe condita: 2119
- Armenian calendar: 815; ԹՎ ՊԺԵ
- Assyrian calendar: 6116
- Balinese saka calendar: 1287–1288
- Bengali calendar: 772–773
- Berber calendar: 2316
- English Regnal year: 39 Edw. 3 – 40 Edw. 3
- Buddhist calendar: 1910
- Burmese calendar: 728
- Byzantine calendar: 6874–6875
- Chinese calendar: 乙巳年 (Wood Snake); 4063 or 3856 — to — 丙午年 (Fire Horse); 4064 or 3857
- Coptic calendar: 1082–1083
- Discordian calendar: 2532
- Ethiopian calendar: 1358–1359
- Hebrew calendar: 5126–5127
- Hindu calendars
- Vikram Samvat: 1422–1423
- Shaka Samvat: 1287–1288
- Kali Yuga: 4466–4467
- Holocene calendar: 11366
- Igbo calendar: 366–367
- Iranian calendar: 744–745
- Islamic calendar: 767–768
- Japanese calendar: Jōji 5 (貞治５年)
- Javanese calendar: 1279–1280
- Julian calendar: 1366; MCCCLXVI
- Korean calendar: 3699
- Minguo calendar: 546 before ROC 民前546年
- Nanakshahi calendar: −102
- Thai solar calendar: 1908–1909
- Tibetan calendar: ཤིང་མོ་སྦྲུལ་ལོ་ (female Wood-Snake); 1492 or 1111 or 339 — to — མེ་ཕོ་རྟ་ལོ་ (male Fire-Horse); 1493 or 1112 or 340

1366: Count Amadeus VI of Savoy fights the Savoyard crusade on behalf of the Catholic and Eastern Orthodox churches.

Year 1366 (MCCCLXVI) was a common year starting on Thursday of the Julian calendar.

== Events ==
=== January – March ===
- January 3 – Count Amadeus VI of Savoy, preparing to lead a Christian crusade against the Muslim Turks in the Balkans, names Bonne de Bourbon, his wife, as the regent to govern Savoy during his absence.
- January 6 – As the members of the Savoyard crusade are preparing to depart from Le Bourget-du-Lac in France to fight the Turks in the Balkans, Pope Urban V announces from Avignon that all funding from the Vatican will be discontinued, and revokes two papal bulls that had been issued on April 1, 1364 for a crusade to the Holy Land. While Amadeus persuades Pope Urban to give a papal blessing, no funding is made and Count Amadeus issues a tax on the citizens of Savoy to pay for the crusade.
- January 18 – Dmitry Donskoy, the Grand Prince of Moscow and ruler of much of Russia, marries Eudoxia Dmitriyevna, daughter of Dmitry of Suzdal, Grand Prince of Vladimir, who had taken the office from Donskoy in 1360.
- January 28 – Adam de Bury is removed from the office of Lord Mayor of London by the city's aldermen, and replaced by John Lovekyn.
- January 20 – King Edward III of England sends a summons directing the members of the English Parliament to assemble at Westminster on May 4 for an eight-day session.
- February 8 – Savoyard crusade: Amadeus of Savoy departs from France with a fleet of ships toward Venice, and arrives at Rivoli by February 15.
- February 18 – The Statutes of Kilkenny are passed by the Irish Parliament, which had been summoned by Lionel, Duke of Clarence, Lord Lieutenant of Ireland and son of King Edward III of England, to curb the decline of the Hiberno-Norman Lordship of Ireland.
- March 13 – Enrique of Trastámara deposes his half-brother, King Pedro of Castile, to become the new King of Castile.
- March 19 – Otto VII of Wittelsbach, Elector of Brandenburg, marries Katharine of Luxembourg, daughter of the reigning monarch, Charles IV, Holy Roman Emperor, and widow of the late Rudolf IV, Duke of Austria.Urban 1989, p. 244 On the same day, Katharine's sister Elisabeth marries the new Duke of Austria, Albrecht III.
- March 29 – The coronation of Enrique of Trastamara as King Enrique II of Castile takes place at the Abbey of Santa María la Real de Las Huelgas in Burgos, now in Spain.

=== April – June ===
- April 17 – Paul of Thebes is appointed by Pope Urban V as the new Latin Patriarch of Constantinople
- April 26 – Simon Islip, the Archbishop of Canterbury since 1349, dies at Mayfield, Sussex, three years after having suffered a stroke that deprived him of the power of speech, beginning a vacancy that lasts for a year and a half after Bishop William Edington, declines to become the leader of the English Roman Catholic Church.
- May 4 – The English Parliament assembles at Westminster, but the session adjourns on May 11 without any accomplishments, and does not meet again until 1368.
- May 10 – King Edward III elects William Edgington, Bishop of Winchester, as the new Archbishop of Canterbury, but Edgington declines the office for reasons of health.
- May 25 – Arnaud de Cervole, who had assembled a group of mercenaries to join a crusade against the Turks in Hungary, is murdered by his own men while they are encamped on the Rhône river in France near Mâcon.
- May 29 – After the city councilmen of Bremen refuse to comply with the orders of Bremen's Archbishop-Prince Albert II of Brunswick, troops sent by Albert invade the city, drive out the existing council, and burn the symbol of Bremen's autonomy, the Bremen Roland.
- June 8 – Having raised funding in Pavia and stopped in Padua on June 1 with his fleet, Amadeus of Savoy and his troops arrive at the Republic of Venice, where the Republic provides him additional support.
- June 21 – The Savoyard crusade reaches its next phase as Amadeus and his troops depart from Venice toward Bulgaria.
- June 27 – Count Conrad II of Oldenburg captures the city of Bremen and drives out troops that had been sent by Albert II of Brunswick to end the city's autonomy. Members of the city council, who had been installed temporarily by Albert to replace the existing council members, are beheaded and the autonomy of Bremen and neighboring Stade is restored.
- June 28 – King Lajos of Hungary issues the Decree of Turda in what is now Romania, granting special privileges to nobles of the province of Transylvania "in order to remove, from this country, malefactors belonging to any nation, especially Romanians," including the power to take measures against non-resident Romanian landowners.

=== July – September ===
- July 22 – Pope Urban V suspends aid to the Greek Orthodox Church for a year, and conditions further aid to the return of the Orthodox clergy to Roman Catholicism. In response, the Emperor of Byzantium, John V Palaiologos declines to assist the Savoyard Crusade.
- July 23 – Bahmani–Vijayanagara War (1362–1367): The Battle of Kauthal takes place in what is now the Andhra Pradesh state of India as troops of the Bahmani Kingdom (led by the Sultan Mohammed Shah I defeat a larger force from the Vijayanagara Empire, ruled by the Emperor Bukka Raya I.
- August 11 – Tvrtko Kotromanić, ruler of Bosnia, grants his general, Vukac Hrvatinić, the Pliva Valley župa and the town of Sokol for his loyalty during Bosnia's war against Hungary.
- August 22 – Savoyard crusade: The crusaders under Amadeus launch a naval attack and invasion, led by Francesco I Gattilusio, Prince of Lesbos, against the Turkish-held city of Gelibolu (Gallipoli). The Turks abandon the city and Gelibolu falls to the Crusaders on August 26.
- September 4 – Savoyard crusade: The crusaders' ships arrive off of the coast of Constantinople.
- September 23 – The Treaty of Libourne is signed at the city of Libourne in Aquitaine (now in France) between the recently-deposed King Pedro of Castile, Edward the Black Prince, son of King Edward III of England and heir to the throne; and King Carlos II of Navarre as Prince Edward commits English troops to aid the Spanish troops in fighting invaders from the Kingdom of France and Castile's King Enrique II during the Castilian Civil War.

=== October – December ===
- October 4 – Savoyard crusade: After leaving a contingent of troops to protect Constantinople and the Christian community, Amadeus and his fleet arrive at the coast of Turkish-held Bulgaria, after crossing the Black Sea. By October 20, the crusaders capture Nesebar.
- October 12 – Frederick the Simple, King of Sicily, promulgates a law prohibiting the external decoration of Jewish synagogues, and directs that any existing decorating be taken down.
- October 26 – Comet 55P/Tempel–Tuttle passes within 0.0229 AU (3,430,000 km; 2,130,000 mi) from Earth.
- November 6 – In the city of Amer in what is now the Rajasthan state of India, the Raja Udaikaran becomes the new ruler of the Kingdom of Amber in India as the Raja Johnsi Dev dies after a reign of almost 50 years.
- November 7 – Gerald FitzGerald, 3rd Earl of Desmond replaces Prince Lionel as the Lord Lieutenant of Ireland and Lionel, who had served since 1361, leaves Ireland, vowing never to return.
- December 9 – At the urging of the Mamluk nobles, the Mamluk Sultan Al-Ashraf Sha'ban arrests the Emir Yalbugha al-Umari, who is then taken from prison and dismembered by his attackers.
- December 27 – Red Turban Rebellions: Zhu Yuanzhang begins the 10-month siege of the Chinese city of Suzhou, controlled by the rebel warlord Zhang Shicheng who has plundered the cities of the Jiangsu province and the Zhejiang province for the past 13 years. Zhang is able to resist until the fall of Suzhuou on October 1, 1367, when he is captured and imprisoned at the Ming dynasty center at Nanjing, where Zhu declares himself as the Hongwu Emperor and becomes ruler of China.

=== Date unknown ===
- Abu Faris Abd al-Aziz I of Morocco succeeds assassinated Abu Zayyan as Sultan of the Marinid Empire in Morocco.
- The Den Hoorn brewery is founded at Leuven in the Low Countries. In 1717 this will be renamed the Brouwerij Artois, and later releases a beer in 1926 named Stella Artois.
- Zhu Yuanzhang, leader of the Red Turban Rebellion that will overthrow the Yuan dynasty and establish the Ming dynasty two years later, begins building the walls for a new capital city at Nanjing.
- Thomas Fraser obtains lands in Aberdeenshire (Scotland) on which he starts the building of a towerhouse, that will later be known as Muchalls Castle.

== Births ==
- May 11 – Anne of Bohemia, queen of Richard II of England (d. 1394)
- August 28 – Jean Le Maingre, marshal of France (d. 1421)
- date unknown
  - Elizabeth Fitzalan, Duchess of Norfolk, English noblewoman (d. 1425)
  - Miran Shah, governor of Azerbaijan (d. 1408)
- Approximate
  - Eleanor de Bohun, English noble (d.1399)

== Deaths ==
- January 25 – Henry Suso, German mystic (b. c. 1295)
- April 26 – Simon Islip, Archbishop of Canterbury
- May 20 – Maria of Calabria, Empress of Constantinople (b. 1329)
- Summer – Ming Yuzhen, founder of the rebel empire of Daxia (b. 1331)
- October 14 – Ibn Nubata, Arab poet (b. 1287)
- October 18 – Petrus Torkilsson, Archbishop of Uppsala
