= Turquoise Throne =

A jewel-studded royal throne in Medieval India

The Turquoise Throne or Takht-i-Firoza (Hindustani: Takht-e-fīrozā, Telugu: Vaiḍhūrya simhāsanam) was a famous jewel-studded royal throne of the Bahmani Sultans of Deccan in India. It was a gift by Musunuri Kapaya Nayaka, then king of Warangal (or Telingana), during the Bahmani-Vijayanagar War, where the Bahmanis defeated the latter. Over some time, this throne became one of the most important icons of the Bahmani royalty and heritage.

== Origin of turquoise throne ==
=== Political situation in Deccan in early 1320s ===
The Tughluq empire covered most of India at its height in the 1320s but for only a short time. The Deccan region slipped out of its hands within a few decades beset by rebellions. Two kingdoms arose from these developments: one being the Bahmani Sultanate founded by Alauddin Hasan Gangu Bahman Shah or Zafar Khan, and the other the Telingana kingdom at Warangal under the Musunuri Nayaks. The two kingdoms warred with each other for a period, eventually reaching a truce. During the reign of Mohammad Bin Tughluq, two new kingdoms arose in the south of Deccan, namely, the Vijayanagara Empire and the Madurai Sultanate. A precursor of this truce was a joint attack by the Kapaya Nayaka and the Vijayanagara forces to capture the Raichur fort being foiled by Muhammad Shah Bahmani.

=== A gift for truce ===
This turquoise throne was originally commissioned in Warangal, intended for the Delhi Sultan, Muhammad ibn Tughluq. (Note: Firishta mentions that the throne was prepared by the Rai of Telingana, but from his work it is not sure if it was Kapaya Nayaka or his predecessor Prolaya Nayaka who commissioned it.) But the Tughluq rule was overthrown in Warangal before it could be delivered to Delhi. Telangana region was liberated by Musunuri Nayaks in the early 1330s. Nearly after three decades, the King of Telangana (or Warangal) Kapaya Nayaka came up with a proposal that caught the imagination of the Bahmani sultan. Kapaya Nayaka agreed to present the Bahmani with such a wonderful gift that is worthy only to be offered to a great king if they accept a truce and fix a frontier between the two kingdoms. This came after Nagadeva, (Note: In some accounts, son of Kapaya Nayaka was referred to as Vinayāka. Also, Kapaya Nayaka was referred to as Kānhayya.) son of Kapaya Nayaka was brutally killed aftermath of a war with the Bahmani Sultanate. Kapaya Nayaka also gave an undertaking that he would not ally with the newly founded Hindu Vijayanagara empire in the south.

That treaty between the Bahmani sultanate and Telangana kingdom occurred at Kaulas and Golconda was fixed as the frontier between the two. The throne was packed in a large wooden box at Warangal and was concealed so that its contents remain unknown until it is presented to the Sultan Mohammed Shah I at Gulbarga.

When ascending the new throne, Sultan named it taxt-i-fīrozā due to the color of the enamel work and predominant precious stones. Firishta mentioned that Sultan first sat on the new throne on Nowruz, the Persian new year following the autumnal solstice in 764AH. (Note: Firishta mentioned that on March 23rd, 1363CE, this throne replaced the earlier Throne made of silver on which Ala-ud-Din Bahman Shah, the first Bahmani sultan used to sit.) After this truce, Kapaya Nayaka had peace with the Bahmani Sultans. He was however faced with rebellions from other Telugu chieftains, eventually getting killed in battle at Bheemaram in 1368 CE. (Note: This Bhimavaram village was supposed to be near Warangal, Telangana and should not be confused with the Bhimavaram located in the West Godavari district of Andhra Pradesh. This Bhimavaram village is now known as "Bhīmāram".)

== Description of the throne ==
This throne was taken to then capital Gulbarga for installation in the Royal 'Durbar hall'. That event was marked by great festivities and pomp where three hundred singers arrived from Delhi. The erstwhile silver throne used by his father, the very first Bahmani Sultan got shifted to the treasury.

Persian historian Firishta stated that the imperial throne was studded with precious stones such as emeralds. It originally had a hue of turquoise and according to him exceeded splendour and intrinsic value every other in the world. Originally made of ebony, it got gold plated and studded with precious stones when it was presented. Also, when the throne got presented it was coated with enamel which gave it a turquoise color and thus the name takht-i-firoza, turquoise throne. The word 'firoza' means turquoise in Persian. The dimension of the throne was supposed to be three feet broad and nine feet long. The Takht-i-Firoza symbolizied the craftsmanship of the Telugu artisans that impressed the Bahmani Sultan. Firishta mentioned that over a period of time, each Sultan added more embellishments which made it fully covered with jeweled stones by the time he saw it. Around eighteen Sultans sat on this fabulous throne and above it, a canopy was fixed. That canopy was studded with a very precious large ruby stone that was present by one of the Vijayanagara Emperors.

Ever since the capital was shifted from Gulbarga to Bidar by Ahmad Shah, the Takht-i-Firoza throne was placed in the grand hall of audience (Note: It was known in Persian as dīwān-i-ām (Persian: ديوان عام) and also referred to as Jāli-maḥall.) and surrounded on its two sides by silver chairs used as seats for the holy men.

== Dismantling of the throne ==
This throne was used by every Bahmani sultan starting from Mohammed Shah I. However, at the very end of the Bahmani sultanate, Sultan Mahmood Shah Bahmani II extracted its jewels to repay his expenditure. (Note: Mahmood Shah Bahmani II indulged more in pleasures and became a puppet ruler. Instead of the Sultan, Malik Na'ib, Nizam-ul-Mulk Malik Hasan Bahri ran the sultanate. Within a decade after Mahmood Shah, the Bahmani sultanate ended and the five Deccan sultanates took control of its lands.) At the time of Mahood Shah the jewels of the throne was evaluated by then jewellers whose estimate was around one crore of pagodas or three and half crores of rupees.

== See also ==
- Peacock Throne
- Bahmani Sultanate
