= Bahmani–Vijayanagara War (1362–1367) =

14th century war between the Bahmanis and the Vijayanagara empire

First Bahmani–Vijayanagar War
- Part of Bahmani–Vijayanagar Wars
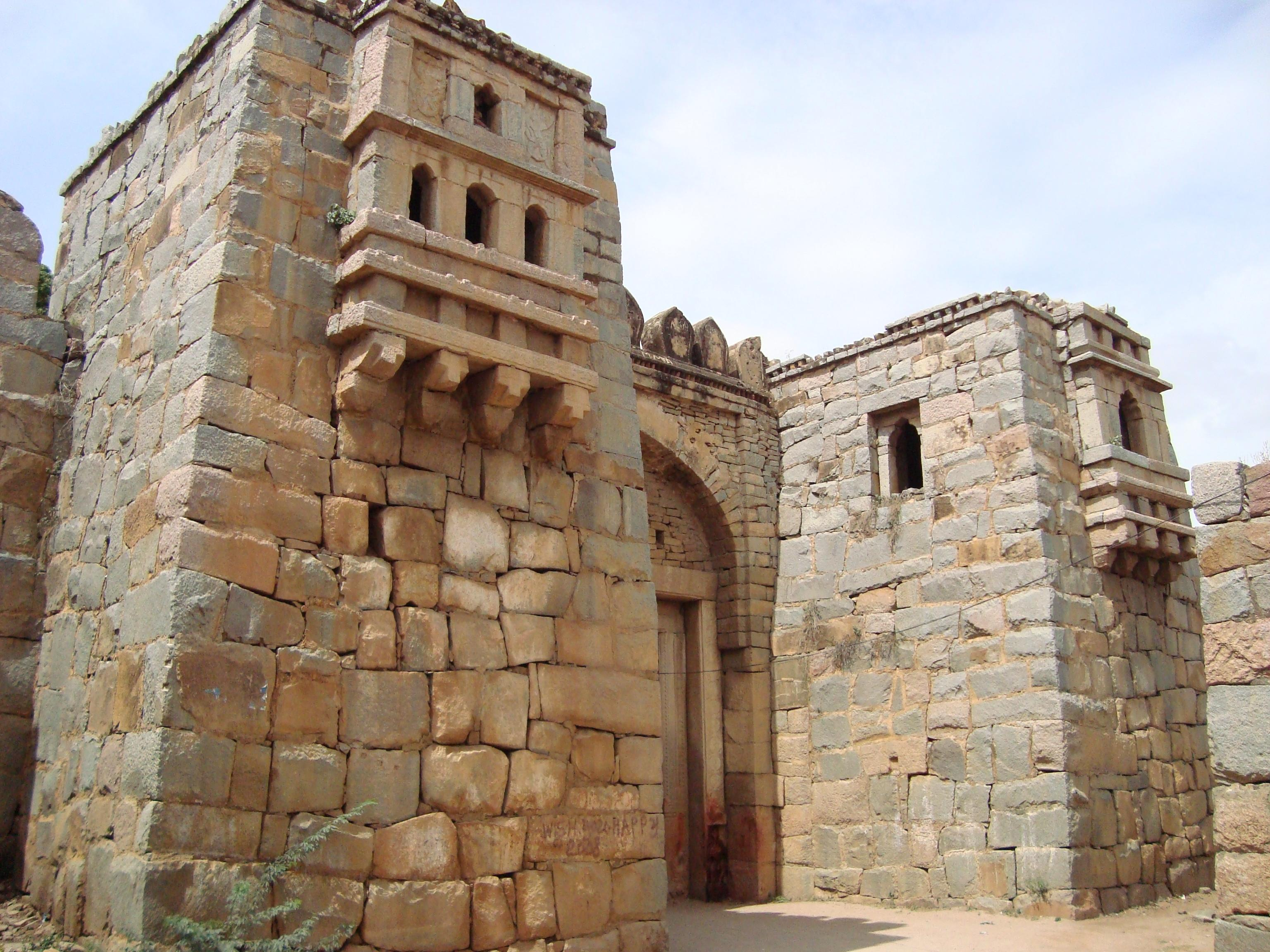
- Fort of Mudgal, which was captured by Bukka Raya, and then recaptured by Muhammed Shah I
Date	1362–1367
Location	Modern day Telangana, Andhrapradesh and Karnataka 15.6°N 77°E
Result	Bahmani victory
Territorial changes	Golconda annexed to the Bahmani Sultanate.; Warangal becomes a vassal of the Bahmani Sultanate.

Belligerents
Bahmani Sultanate	Vijayanagara Empire; Musunuri Nayakas

Commanders and leaders
Muhammed Shah I (WIA); Safdar Khan Sistani; Azam-i Humayun; Khan Muhammed; Musa Khan †; Isa Khan †	Bukka Raya I (surrendered); Kanhayya (surrendered); Vinayak Deva (executed); Mallinatha †

Strength
At Mudgal: 8,000; At Kauthal: 50,000 Infantry; 15,000 Cavalry	At Mudgal: 100,000–900,000 Infantry; 30,000–80,000 Cavalry; 3,000 Elephants; At Kauthal: 500,000 Infantry; 40,000 Cavalry

Casualties and losses
7,999 people killed at Mudgal.; Unknown number of people killed at Kauthal	70,000.–90,000 Killed at Mudgal.; 10,000 Killed at Vijayanagar.; 400,000 to 500,000 civilians killed.; 2,000 Elephants captured.; 300 Gun carriages captured.; 700 Horses captured.; Bejeweled thrones captured from Warangal and Vijayanagar.
- The location where the Battle of Kauthal occurred Bahmani–Vijayanagara War (1362–1367) (India)

The Bahmani–Vijayanagar war, also known as the First Bahmani–Vijayanagar War, spanning from 1362 to 1367, was a significant period of conflict between the Bahmani Sultanate and the Vijayanagara Empire in the Deccan Plateau of India during the fourteenth and fifteenth centuries. It began due to disputes over the acceptance of coins in both states, with Bahmani ruler Muhammed Shah I banning Vijayanagar coins in his dominions. This move prompted Vijayanagar's Bukka Raya I to forge an alliance with Musunuri Nayakas, the then rulers of Warangal, Kanhayya, and local bankers, resulting in the destruction of Bahmani coins and the escalation of tensions leading to outright war.

The conflict intensified with the execution of Warangal's prince by the Bahmanis, a consequence of disputes over horse trading. This event ultimately led to the vassalization of Warangal, further fueling animosity between the two powers. As the war progressed, Bahmani victories over Vijayanagar forces at Mudgal and Kauthal resulted in heavy casualties among the civilian population. In 1367, Muhammed Shah laid siege to Vijayanagar, where Bukka Raya had shut himself after two consecutive defeats, and massacred the Vijayanagar population, prompting Bukka Raya I to seek peace. However, the conflict continued, with subsequent battles further decimating Vijayanagar's resources and population. Kanhayya, the ruler of Warangal gave the famous Turquoise Throne to the Bahmani Sultan during these campaigns.

Ultimately, both parties signed a treaty aimed at preventing civilian massacres in future conflicts, marking a pivotal moment in the military history of fourteenth-century Deccan India. The war highlighted the complex dynamics between regional powers and the devastating impact of conflict on civilian populations in the region.

== Background ==
After the fall of the Hoysala dynasty in South India following the death of Veera Ballala III, who was defeated by the Madurai Sultanate in the Battle of Kannanur, the state was succeeded by some of his officers. Among them, the most prominent were three brothers named Harihara I, who governed the Maratha region, and Bukka Raya I, who ruled over Hampi and Dwarasamudra. Their two younger brothers held minor posts, while Bukka's son Kampana served as the doorkeeper of the Hoysala king. These five brothers and their nephew were the founders of the Vijayanagar empire in the fourteenth century. Meanwhile, the Bahmanis had consolidated their power in the Deccan and were closely monitoring the situation in Delhi. The last mention of Harihara coincides with Bahman Shah's declaration of independence. Harihara I was the first king of the Vijayanagar. By the time of Harihara's death, Bukka appears to have been the sole survivor among the five brothers. When Firuz Shah Tughlaq of Delhi Sultanate announced that he would not endeavour to bring the South back under the rule of Delhi, the rulers of Vijayanagar and of Bahmani, relieved of this concern, were able to engage in hostilities independently. At the same time, a ruler named Kanhayya, also known as Kanhaiya Nayak, or Kanya Nayak, who hailed from the Kakatiya dynasty, established himself within the Vijayanagar realm as the Musunuri Nayaka chief.

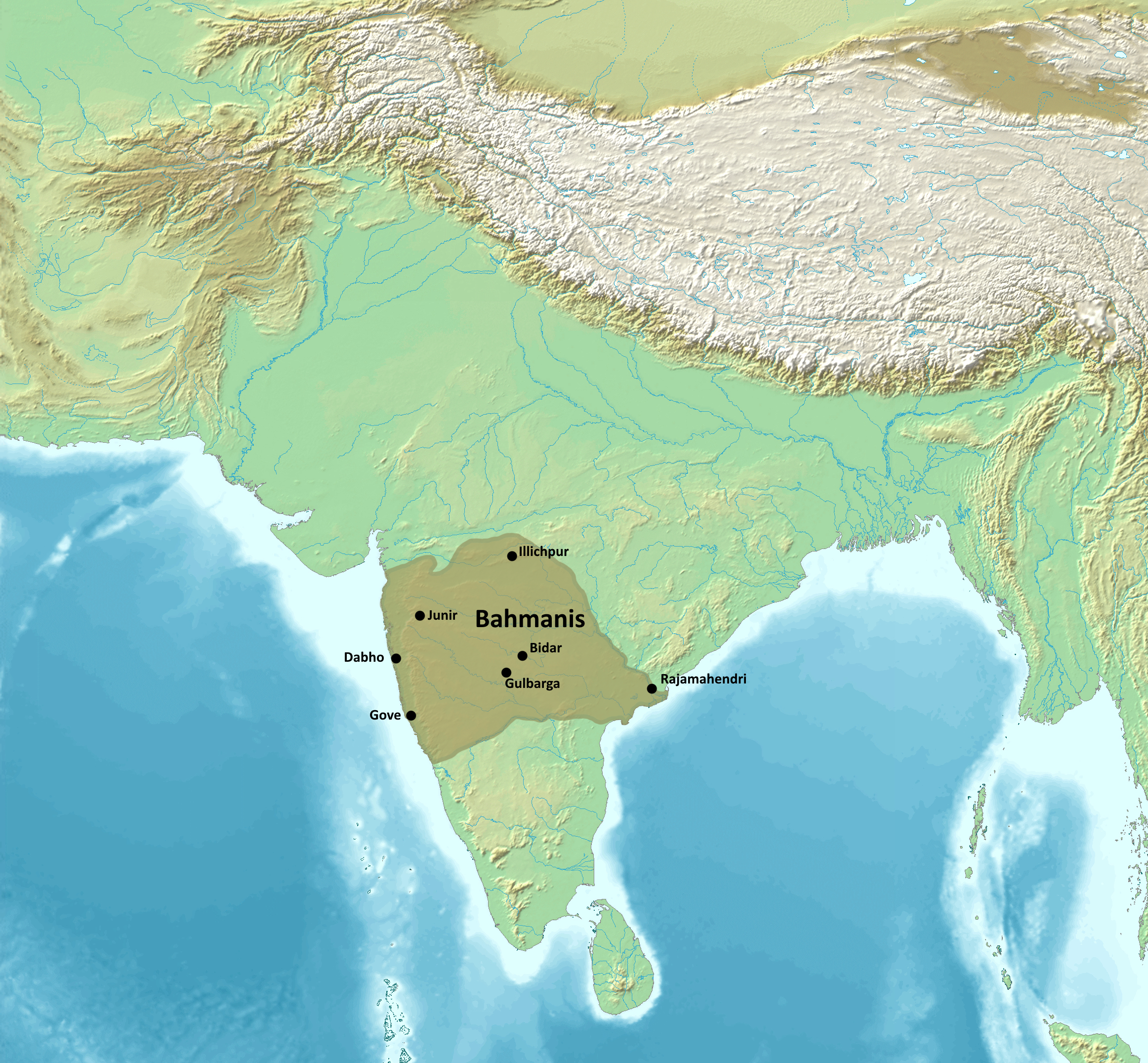
Map of the Bahmani Sultanate (Peak)

Following the demise of Alauddin Bahman Shah, his son Muhammed Shah I succeeded to the throne of the Bahmani Sultanate. During the reign of Muhammad Shah I, the conflicts between the Bahmanis and Vijayanagar commenced. Typically, their conflicts were interpreted as religious wars because of the religious disparities between the two states, leading to the assumption that Vijayanagar had been subjugated to the vassal status of the Bahmanis. However, this notions were the exaggerations during the medieval era. In reality, the wars between the Bahmanis and Vijayanagar were not religious in nature, but rather secular competitions for the acquisition of wealth and territory. Despite the victories of the Bahmanis in these conflicts, Vijayanagar never succumbed to vassalage at any point in time.

The stretch of land between the Krishna and Tungabhadra rivers became a point of contention among various dynasties, including the Western Chalukyas and Cholas, as well as the Yadavas and Hoysalas, who previously ruled over the territories later claimed by the Bahmanis and Vijayanagar. When the Bahmanis and Vijayanagar emerged from the remnants of these empires, history repeated itself. Moreover, the unique circumstances surrounding the formation of these two states made frequent warfare between them a common occurrence. During their inception, each state acquired only certain parts of the Raichur Doab, yet as the political successors of their predecessors, both aspired to control the entire region.

== Prelude ==
During Bahman Shah's reign, he forbade the circulation of Vijayanagar's gold coins within his kingdom. In response, Bukka Raya rebelled and, with the backing of Deccan bankers, melted down Bahmani coins. The Bahmanis warned the bankers against this, and by 1340, all bankers and money changers within Bahmani territory were captured and executed. Their descendants were barred from conducting business for the next forty years.

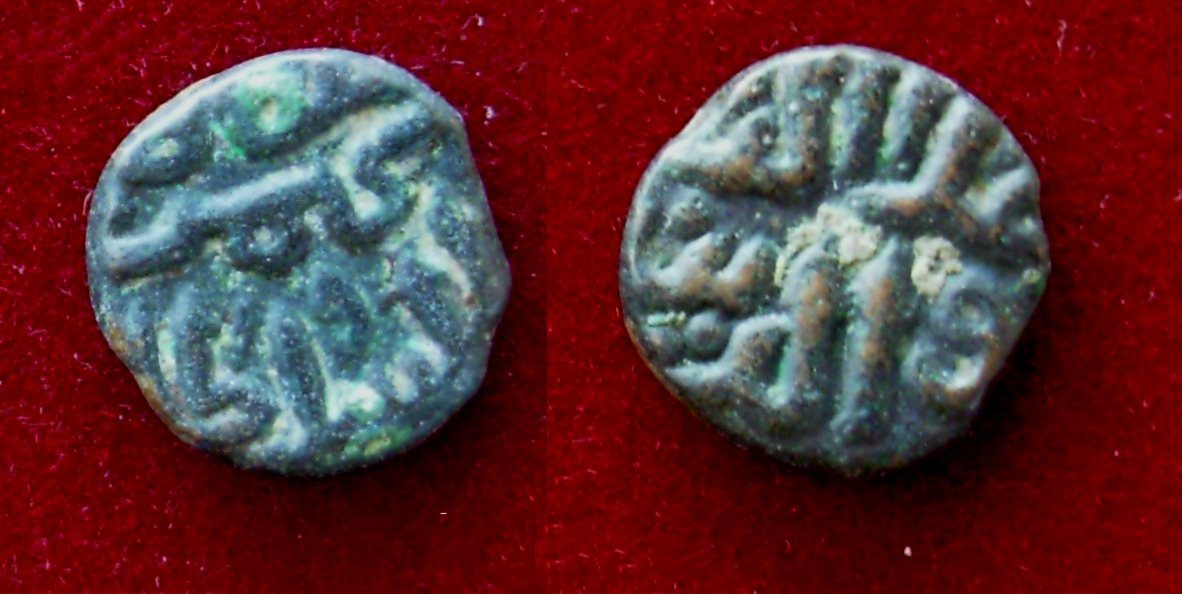
Coins of Alauddin Bahman Shah

Bukka Raya, the king of Vijayanagar, protested against the Bahmani's claim to issue gold coins as a sign of sovereignty, and demanded the cession of Raichur Doab to the Vijayanagar empire. Kanhayya, the ruler of Warangal, demanded the fortress of Kaulas, which had previously been granted to Bahman Shah. This request stemmed from his son's desire to claim the fort from the Sultanate against his own wishes. Bukka Raya also threatened the Bahmanis with joining an alliance with the Delhi Sultanate to invade Deccan. Muhammad Shah, the Bahmani Sultan at the time, delayed his reply until he was prepared. When he finally responded, he questioned why his vassal of Vijayanagar had not sent him gifts upon his accession, stating that it should have been done at least once. The negative response from Muhammad Shah spurred the rulers of Vijayanagar and Warangal to form an alliance against the Bahmanis.

=== Battle of Kaulas (1362) ===
In 1362, the King of Warangal dispatched his son Vinayak Deva from Warangal with a large army comprising infantry and cavalry towards the fortress of Kaulas. To assist Kanhayya, Vijayanagar sent twenty thousand troops. In response, Muhammad Shah dispatched Amirul Umara Bahadur Khan, the son of Ismail Mukh, Azam-i-Humayun, and Safdar Khan Sistani along with the armies of Bidar and Berar. The battle took place near Kaulas, where the Bahmanis defeated the forces of Warangal and pursued them all the way to the gates of Warangal. Kanhayya was forced to pay a ransom of one lakh (100,000) gold Huns and surrender twenty-five war elephants to the Bahmanis. Bahadur Khan then returned to Gulbarga, the capital of the Bahmanis, after securing the ransom.

== The War ==
=== Capture and execution of Vinayak Deva (1362) ===
Shortly after the conflict with Kanhayya, Muhammed Shah learned that Vinayak Deva, Kanhayya's son, had allegedly compelled horse traders to sell horses at a lower price, despite them being the finest horses reserved for the Bahmani Sultan. Haroon Khan Sherwani suggests that the narrative of horse reservation might have been fabricated by the horse traders themselves.

Muhammed Shah resolved to punish Vinayak for his actions. While Vinayak was at Palmet, Shah dispatched some of his fighters disguised as destitute individuals who had lost their possessions. Chaos erupted in Palmet, when the fighters took up arms and arrested Vinayak. Shah then launched a raid on Warangal, captured Vinayak Deva, and subjected him to a cruel execution, citing the insult he perceived from Vinayak's actions. The people of Andhra were incensed by Vinayak's death. When Shah attempted to retrace his steps to Bidar, they launched an attack from rooftops and trees, resulting in the loss of three thousand out of his four thousand men, and Shah himself sustained a wound from a musket ball.

=== Capture of Golconda (1363) ===
The execution of Vinayak Deva set the stage for a war between the two states. Kanhayya appealed to Firuz Shah Tughlaq, the Delhi emperor, for assistance, offering to become his vassal in return. However, Firuz Shah differed greatly from his predecessor, Muhammad Bin Tughlaq, and preferred peaceful pursuits over military endeavours. Perhaps his orthodoxy also deterred him from aiding Hindus against fellow co-religionists. Consequently, he did not respond to their pleas. Meanwhile, these negotiations, coupled with his recent setback, fueled Muhammad Shah I's determination to fully conquer Telangana.

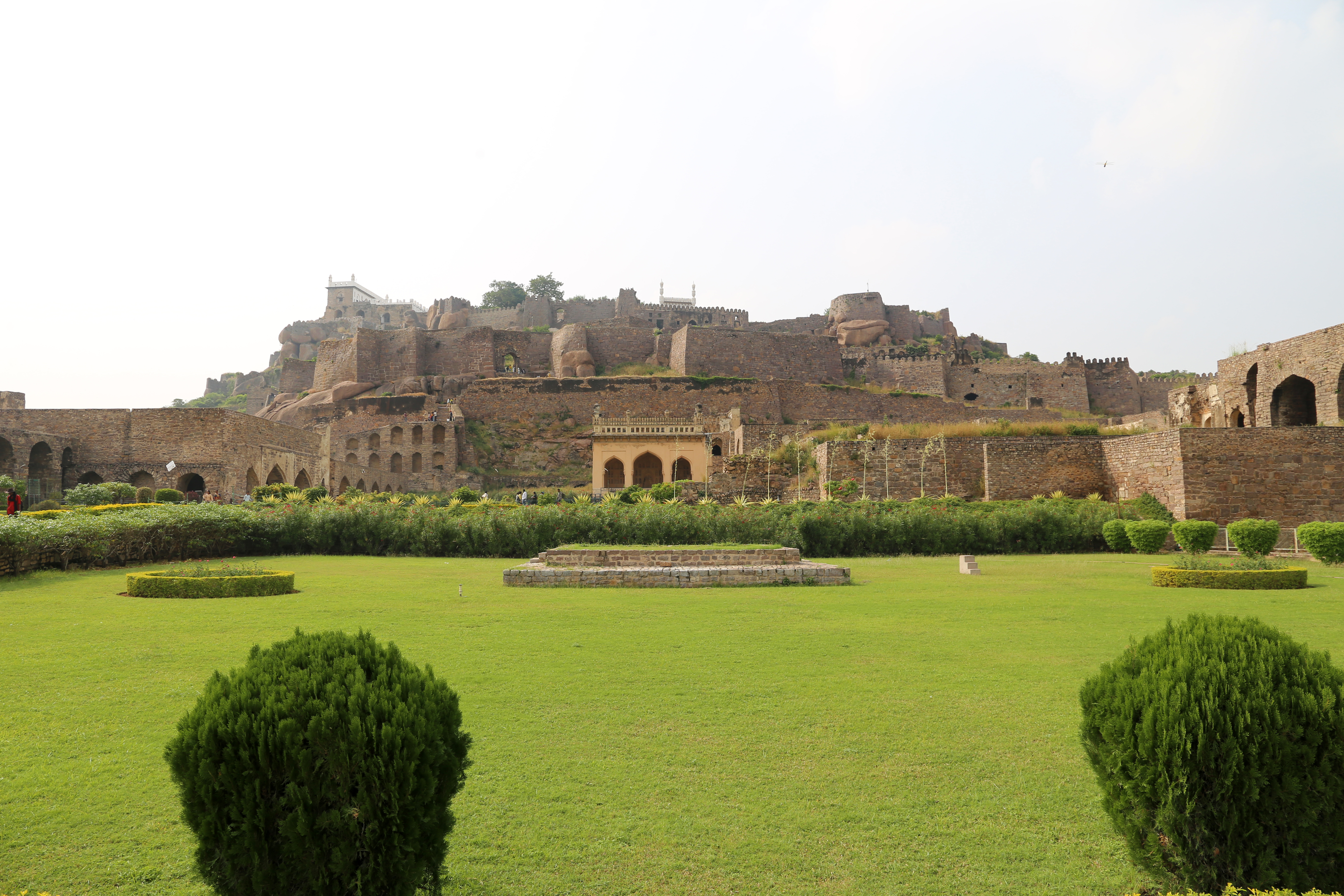
the fort of Golconda, built by Golconda Sultanate

Subsequently, Muhammad Shah summoned Safdar Khan Sistani and Azam-i Humayun to his capital. Entrusting the administration to his minister Malik Saifuddin Ghori, he journeyed to Kaulas and dispatched Azam-i Humayun with the armies of Bidar and Mahur to Golconda. He instructed Safdar Khan Sistani to advance towards Warangal, the capital of Kanhayya. However, when Kanhayya sought aid from Vijayanagar, he received none due to ongoing disputes over the succession to the throne. Realizing the imminent threat, Kanhayya got afraid and fled to the nearby Jungles. Shah remained at Telangana for two years, and besieged Warangal. Finally in 1364, Kanhayya surrendered to Shah and paid thirteen crores of gold Huns, also ceding Golconda to the Bahmanis. Consequently, the ruler of Telangana, Kanhayya, became a vassal of the Bahmanis. Kanhayya also presented the famous Turquoise Throne to the Bahmani Sultan. Muhammad Shah appointed Azam-i Humayun as the overseer of Golconda.

The Kings of Warangal and Vijayanagar found themselves thoroughly outmanoeuvred. Bukka Raya could hardly stand idly by while his ally in Warangal faced annihilation. Consequently, he dispatched ambassadors to Delhi, seeking assistance from Firuz Shah and offering to reclaim their territories in the Deccan. However, Firuz Shah was preoccupied with internal conflicts and unable to take any action.

=== Causes of the invasion of Muhammed Shah ===
Sultan Muhammad Shah I, displeased with Vijayanagar's behaviour, and with the issues regarding Kanhayya resolved, opted to launch an attack on its neighbour, Vijayanagar. To initiate the conflict, he sent a letter to Vijayanagar, demanding payment for three hundred musicians who had travelled from Delhi to Bahmani, likely to participate in the wedding of his son, Mujahid Shah. Shah's inebriation at the time led to the drafting of the letter, and incensed by this act, Bukka Raya retaliated by punishing the messengers with equal indignity. Seeking to gain the upper hand, Bukka declared war and decided to launch a preemptive attack in 1366.

According to some accounts, he prepared the invasion with an army of nine hundred thousand infantry, eighty thousand cavalry, and three thousand elephants. However, another account states that he invaded with one hundred thousand infantry, thirty thousand cavalry, and three thousand elephants. He marched by crossing the Tungabhadra and captured the Mudgal fort, which was garrisoned by eight thousand people. Bukka Raya ordered the killing of everyone there, including men, women and children, sparing only one person to escape and narrate the story to the Bahmani Sultan.

Disturbed by the report, the Sultan proclaimed his son, Mujahid, as the heir to the throne and granted his minister, Malik Saifuddin Ghori, full authority over the country and treasury. He then marched with his army and crossed the river Krishna, vowing to slaughter one hundred thousand Vijayanagaris.

=== Battle of Mudgal (1366) ===
Aware of the looming threat, Bukka took preemptive action by sending all his treasuries to Vijayanagar, while he himself awaited the Sultan's arrival. The following day, he moved his army four miles from the camp, but heavy rainfall overnight turned the ground boggy, impeding the movement of the Vijayanagar army. Recognizing Bukka's predicament, Shah promptly advanced to meet him the next morning.

Upon realizing the disadvantage and upon seeing the Sultan, Bukka offered no resistance and fled with some selected troops towards the fortress of Adoni, leaving everything behind. Bukka left the fort, entrusting it to his sister's son. Muhammad Shah, with his army, entered the camp of Vijayanagar and plundered it, fulfilling his vow. He is said to have massacred everyone Bukka left behind, including women and children. According to Ferishta, the numbers were 70,000, while Vijayanagar sources claim it was 90,000. He then said to have captured two thousand elephants, three hundred gun carriages, seven hundred Arab steed horses, and one bejewelled throne. Thus, he recaptured Mudgal from the Vijayanagar.

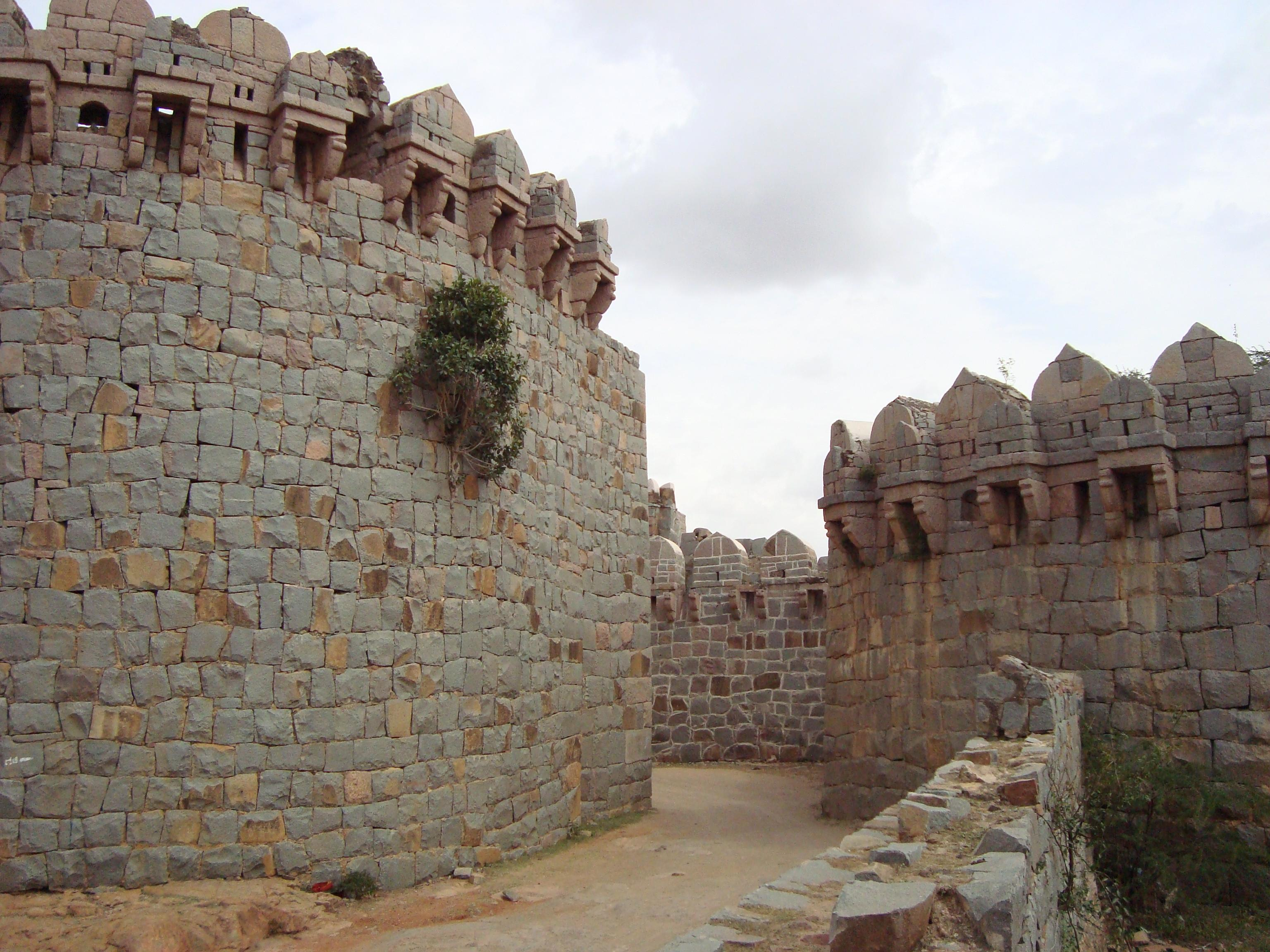
Mugal fort

=== Battle of Kauthal (1366) ===
Upon reaching Adoni, Bukka established his headquarters there and began preparations for war. He dispatched his general Mallinatha to confront the Bahmanis. Meanwhile, Muhammad Shah spent the rainy season at Mudgal and then moved southwards with a large army, crossing the Tungabhadra and entering Vijayanagar territory. This campaign was notable for being the first instance of artillery being used in India. Bukka emerged from his fort and appointed his maternal nephew as the commander of the fort. He also appointed Mallinatha, also known as Bhoj Mal, as the commander-in-chief of the army.

Mallinatha was so confident of his success that he asked Bukka Raya whether he should bring the Sultan alive or dead, and he obtained permission from Bukka to bring him slain to the foot of the Vijayanagar throne. Muhammad Shah crossed the Tungabhadra and reached Siruguppa with fifteen thousand cavalry and fifty thousand infantry. Meanwhile, Mallinatha commanded an army of forty thousand cavalry and five hundred thousand infantry. Muhammad Shah dispatched his general Khan Muhammed to advance with an army of ten thousand cavalry and thirty thousand infantry. The decisive battle between the Bahmanis and Vijayanagar took place on 20 July 1366.

The battle occurred near a place called Kauthal, with Musa Khan commanding the right side of the Bahmani army, Isa Khan leading the left side, and Khan Muhammed commanding the center. However, both Musa Khan and Isa Khan were killed by musket balls, resulting in their demise. This turn of events left the Bahmani army on the brink of being routed. However, Muhammad Shah arrived with three thousand cavalry at the crucial moment, turning the tide of the battle. The two armies engaged in hand-to-hand combat, and the elephant of Khan Muhammed, named Sher-i Shikar, advanced towards their commander-in-chief, Mallinatha, severely wounding him. The Vijayanagar forces were decisively routed, and their army fled, leading to a massacre unleashed by the Bahmanis. Mallinatha's wound proved fatal, resulting in his death, and thus, the battle ended with the defeat of Vijayanagar.

=== Siege of Vijayanagar (1366) ===
The loss of the battle had a serious impact on Bukka Raya. After spending a week at Adoni, Muhammed Shah decided to march towards Vijayanagar itself. Bukka Raya attempted to utilize guerrilla warfare tactics while effectively defending his capital with full force. They exerted such pressure on the Bahmanis that they were compelled to retreat towards the Tungabhadra. As the retreating forces were pursued by Bukka Raya, guerrillas entered from the sides, cutting down some of the Bahmani forces. The Sultan was forced to retreat to his own territory. Upon reaching his land, he ordered an attack on Bukka Raya's camp while they were engaged in music, dancing, and drinking. The Bahmanis launched an assault on the Vijayanagar camp, forcing Bukka Raya to retreat to his own capital with his full forces.

Muhammad Shah pursued Bukka Raya, but Raya managed to retreat inside his capital and barricade himself in. Recognizing this, Muhammad Shah ordered a siege. Bukka emerged from Vijayanagar to engage in battle, but suffered another heavy defeat, losing his remaining ten thousand soldiers. He then retreated once more behind the walls of Vijayanagar and shut himself inside. Muhammad Shah, realizing that his victory alone couldn't resolve matters, began to ravage Vijayanagar and plunder its riches. He initiated a massacre of civilians, resulting in the deaths of almost 400,000 to half a million people, including ten thousand Brahmins. The district of Karnataka was so devastated that it took several decades for its population to recover to normal levels. Ultimately, due to protests from Brahmins and other Hindu chiefs, Bukka Raya was compelled to seek peace. According to Ferishta, the Sultan sheathed his sword only after the payment to the musicians was made.

== Aftermath ==
Raya dispatched envoys to the Sultan's camp, requesting peace and appealing for a brotherly relationship between the two states. Upon hearing this, Sultan Muhammed Shah smiled and replied that he desired nothing more than the payment of the Delhi musicians' salary from the Bahmani treasury, as stipulated in the draft he had sent. The musicians, having begged for the Sultan's pardon, also made a suggestion. They pointed out that the massacres committed by the Sultan were entirely against the precepts of Islam, as many women and children were also put to death by those claiming to follow that noble faith, which Islam neither allows nor enjoins. Shah was deeply moved by this appeal and ordered that in any future campaign undertaken on behalf of the Bahmanis, only actual combatants should be killed, and no prisoner of war should ever be harmed. A treaty was then signed, stipulating that both parties would refrain from killing prisoners or civilians in the future, although it was violated several times.

After a thirty-year period of peace, Harihara II initiated another war with the Bahmanis during the reign of Tajuddin Firuz Shah in 1398..

== See also ==
- Bahmani–Vijayanagar War (1398)
- Siege of Vijayanagar
- War of the Goldsmith's Daughter
