= Kothakonda Jatara =

Festival in Telangana, India

- Celebrations: 3 days
- Frequency: Annual

Kothakonda Jatara or Kothakonda Veerabhadra Swamy Brahmotsavam is a festival celebrated during Makar Sankranti in the state of Telangana, India.

The Jatara begins at Kothakonda Village in Bheemadevarpalle mandal of Karimnagar district.

== History ==
Kothakonda is surrounded by picturesque hills. It is known for the famous temple dedicated to Sri Veerabhadra Swamy (an incarnation of Lord Siva). This is just 5 km away from the famous Mulkanoor village known nationwide for its cooperative movement. Former Prime Minister Mr. P.V Narasimha Rao headed this cooperative society early in his life.

The rocky hill adjoining the village has ruins of a big fort with huge gateways bearing beautiful architecture, resembling that of the Kakatiyas. There are five ponds on top of the hill. Of these, two are reported to contain water even under severe drought conditions. The temple of Veerabhadra Swamy is at the foot of this hill. The three-day Kothakonda Jatara celebrated in January every year attracts thousands of pilgrims from all over the Telangana region.

== Ritual ==
The temple is dedicated to the fierce-looking deity of Lord Veerabhadra Swamy along with Kethamma and Medalamma on both sides of the deity.
