= Rebellion of Ismail Mukh =

Rebellion during the Tughlaq era in India

Ismail Mukh's rebellion against the Delhi sultanate
- Part of the Decline of the Tughlaq dynasty
Date	September 1346 – 3 August 1347
Location	Deccan
Result	Rebellion victory: Establishment of the Bahmani Sultanate in the Deccan
Territorial changes	The Delhi Sultanate loses all territory in the Deccan.

Belligerents
Rebellion; Bahmani Sultanate; Deccani Amirs	Delhi Sultanate; Tughlaq dynasty

Commanders and leaders
Ismail Mukh Afghan; Zafar Khan; Malik Yal Afghan	Muhammad bin Tughluq; Nizam-ud-din (POW); Imad-ul-Mulk †; Malik Jauhar; Burhan-ud-din Bilgrami; Aziz Himar †

Strength
15,000; 15,000 reinforcements 5,000 from Ismail Mukh; Total: 35,000	30,000

Casualties and losses
Unknown	Unknown, believed to be heavy

The rebellion of Ismail Mukh took place between 1346 and 1347 when Deccani Amirs placed Ismail Mukh, also known as Nasir-ud-din Ismail Shah, an Afghan noble, at the head of a rebellion centered at Daulatabad. The rebellion saw the decline and loss of the Delhi Sultanate's control over the Deccan, which had been a part of the Delhi Sultanate since the Khilji dynasty. Ismail Mukh abdicated in favor of Zafar Khan on 3 August 1347, which saw the establishment of the Bahmani Sultanate, which went on to exist until 1518.

== Background ==
In 1346, a low-born named Aziz Himar was appointed governor over the cities of Daulatabad, Malwa, and Dhar. Azim Himar was instructed on using intrigue and spying on the centurions of Daulatabad and other nearby cities, as rebellion was common to spark in the Deccan. Following this, a rebellion was triggered in Gujarat, Vadodara, and Bahroch. As a result, Aziz Himar set out to quell the rebellions, but was defeated and killed by the rebels.

Realizing the situation, Muhammad bin Tughlaq, the emperor of the Delhi Sultanate under the Tughlaq dynasty, marched against the rebels himself and defeated them, pacifying the region. Following this, Muhammad sent two nobles to Daulatabad, and wished for the centurions to meet him. Fearing the worst, the Daulatabad centurions killed the nobles who had arrived at Daulatabad. Alongside this, they imprisoned Mawlānā Nizam-ud-din, and killed many other officers of the Delhi Sultanate, officially declaring rebellion.

== Conflict ==
Following this, the rebels opened the imperial treasury in Daulatabad and divided its spoils amongst themselves. And after further being reinforced from centurions that came from Gujarat, they placed an Afghan noble, Ismail Mukh, also known as Nasir-ud-din as the leader of this rebellion.

With this, Muhammad departed from Bahroch and marched on Daulatabad. The rebels met Muhammad in battle, but were defeated. As a result, the rebels fled to the citadel of Daulatabad, holding out for siege there, while other officers such as Zafar Khan departed for their own lands.

Muhammad besieged the citadel and allowed the city of Daulatabad to be plundered, while also dispatching Imad-ul-Mulk against Zafar Khan. The siege of Daulatabad's citadel continued for three months until another rebellion was triggered in Gujarat, which demanded the attention of Muhammad. Muhammad marched with all the populace of Daulatabad to Gujarat to quell the rebellion, leaving Malik Jauhar, Burhan-ud-din Bilgrami, and other nobles to continue the siege of the citadel.

Despite this, they were unable to halt the dauntless pursuits of the imperial army led by the rebels. After Muhammad withdrew, the centurions that were dispersed now re-assembled their forces under Zafar Khan and defeated Imad-ul-Mulk in battle, killing him. The rebel forces under Zafar Khan then marched on Daulatabad and defeated the besieging army, completely routing them.

=== Abdication of Ismail Mukh (Nasir-ud-din Ismail Shah) ===
Following the victories of Zafar Khan, Ismail Mukh deemed Zafar Khan as a worthy ruler and capable successor. Ismail Mukh used the excuse of his old age and abdicated in favor of Zafar Khan. The Deccani Amirs followed in Ismail Mukh's decision and crowned Zafar Khan on 3 August 1347.

With this, Zafar Khan established the Bahmani Sultanate, taking on the title of Alauddin Bahman Shah, and successfully made the Deccan an independent Muslim state from the Delhi Sultanate.

== Aftermath ==
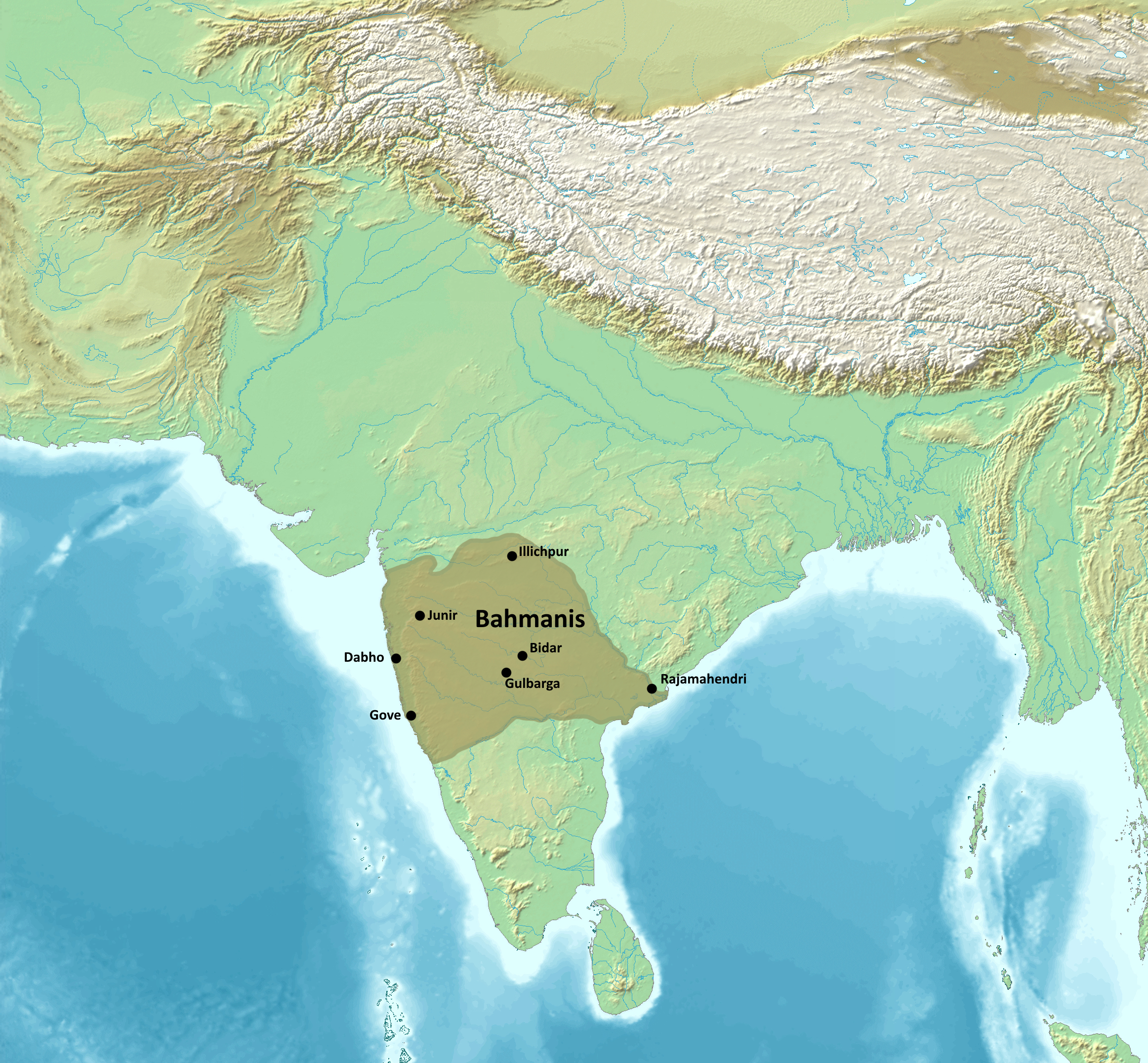
Map of the Bahmani Sultanate at its height

The Delhi Sultanate continued to decline and the Bahmani Sultanate would begin its rise to power as the first Muslim state centered in the Deccan, its capital was established at Gulbarga.

== Sources ==
- Dhar Mahajan, Vidyan (2007). History of Medieval India. S. Chand Publishing. ISBN 9788121903646.
- Gribble, J.D.B (1896). A History of the Deccan, Volume 1. Luzac and Company.
- Haig, Wolseley (1907). Historic landmarks of the Deccan. Pioneer Press.
