= Musunuri Nayakas =

Medieval ruling dynasty in South India (1335–1368)

Musunuri dynasty
- 1335–1368
- Status: Dynasty
- Capital: Warangal
- Common languages: Telugu
- Religion: Hinduism
- Government: Monarchy
- Historical era: Medieval India
  - Established: 1335
  - Disestablished: 1368
Preceded by	Succeeded by
Kakatiya dynasty; Delhi Sultanate	Recherla Nayaks; Bahmani Sultanate

The Musunuri Nayakas were Telugu warrior kings of 14th-century South India who were briefly significant in the region of Telangana and Andhra Pradesh. Musunuri Kapaya Nayaka is said to have taken a leadership role among the Andhra chieftains and driven out the Delhi Sultanate from Warangal. But his rise was soon challenged by the Bahmani Sultanate and he was defeated. The Recherla Nayakas wrested power from him in 1368.

== Origins ==
Little is known about the Musunuri family; they are often described as "obscure". The founding ruler of the family, Musunuri Prolaya Nayaka, suddenly appeared as a new ruler at Rekapalle, near Bhadrachalam, around 1330, claiming heritage from the Kakatiyas. The Vilasa grant mentions the father Prolaya Nayaka as Pocha[ya], and grandfather's name as Pota[ya], but no further information about them is given.

Some Andhra historians state that Musunuri Nayaks belonged to the Kamma caste group. However, the modern castes of Andhra region did not originate until the late stages of the Vijayanagara Empire. Musunuri Nayakas were ardent Shaivites and Kapaya Nayaka claimed that he was divinely appointed by the Lord Visweswara of Kashi (i.e. Lord Siva) to protect the dharma.

== Opposition to the Delhi Sultanate's Invasion ==
After the fall of the Kakatiyas, their empire was annexed by the Delhi Sultanate. Ulugh Khan (or Muhammad bin Tughluq), the general that conquered Warangal, renamed it "Sultanpur" and remained as the governor of the region for a short period. In 1324, he was recalled to Delhi to succeed the Khaljis as Muhammad bin Tughluq. A former Kakatiya commander, Nagaya Ganna Vibhudu, now renamed Malik Maqbul, was appointed as the governor of the region. However, the Tughluq hold over the erstwhile Kakatiya empire was tenuous and a number of local chieftains seized effective power.

== Prolaya Nayaka ==
Musunuri Nayakas locations

According to the Vilasa grant, Prolaya Nayaka ruled from Rekapalle. Located at the edge of the Papikondalu hills of the Eastern Ghats. Rekapalle held a strategic control of the narrow Sabari River Valley in between the Bhadrachalam forest and the Papikondalu forests. Konda Reddis, who populated the hill forests would have facilitated Prolaya Nayaka's rebellion against the Sultanate. Rekapalle was also a strategic location to control or obstruct communications on the Godavari river passing through the hills.

Prolaya Vema Reddi of the Panta Reddi clan, who seems to have established his own independent rule in Addanki by 1325, is believed to have taken control of the region between the Krishna and Godavari rivers, perhaps up to Rajahmundry. Historian M. Rama Rao states that Prolayavema Reddi and Prolaya Nayaka must have made a "joint effort" to drive the Muslim rule out from the area.

In 1330, Prolaya Nayaka published the Vilasa grant, a copper-plate grant near Pithapuram, in which he bemoaned the devastation of the Telugu country brought about by northern Muslim armies, and attempted to legitimise himself as the rightful restorer of order. Prolaya Nayaka left no children and was succeeded by a cousin, Kapaya Nayaka, who governed until 1368 and attempted to further expand his rule.

== Kapaya Nayaka ==
=== Rebellion ===
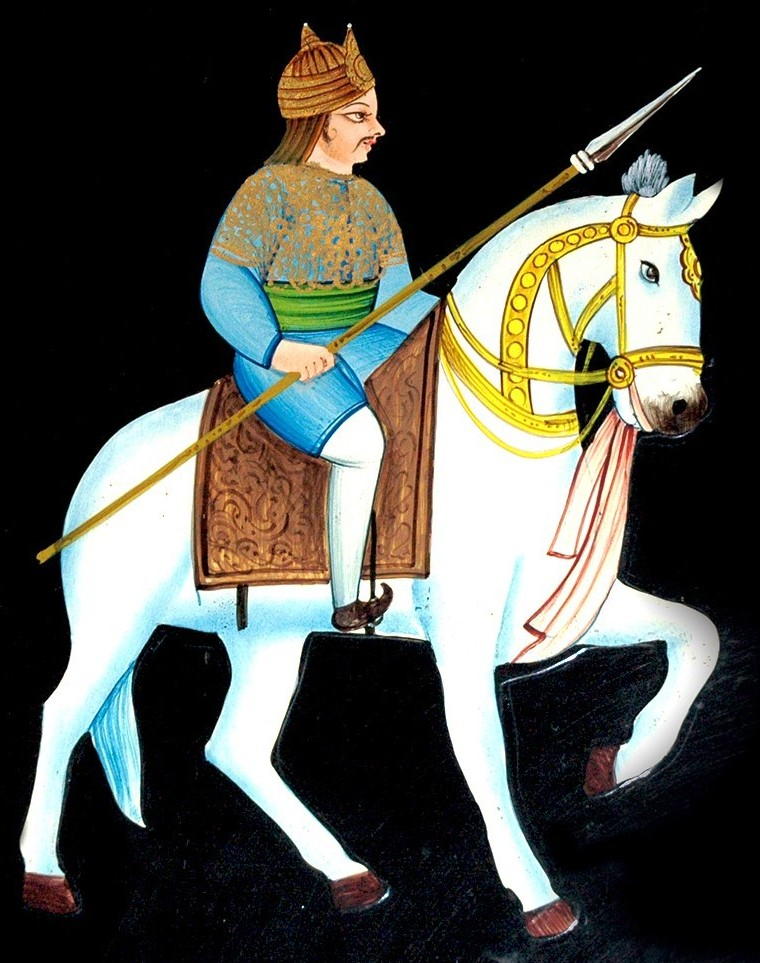
Musunuri Kapaya Nayaka

Kapaya Nayaka (r. 1333–1368) led a larger rebellion against the Tughluq rule, driving it out of Warangal in 1336. According to the Kaluvacheru grant of Anithalli, a female member of the Panta Reddi clan in 1423, Kapaya Nayaka was assisted by 75 Nayakas. The grant also states that Prolaya Vema Reddi was one among these 75 Nayakas, but this is doubtful. (Note: The Kaluvacheru grant states that Prolaya Vema Reddi became independent after the death of Kapaya Nayaka in 1368. However, it is known that Vema Reddi was already independent by 1325. M. Somasekhara Sarma recognises the mistake in the record, but nevertheless believes that Vema Reddi acted as a subordinate of the Musunuri Nayakas, while M. Rama Rao states that they bore no relation to each other.)

Muhammad bin Tughluq, who became the Sultan of Delhi in 1324, witnessed numerous rebellions starting in 1330, first in the immediate vicinity in the Ganga-Yamuna doab, which caused a famine in Delhi, and rebellions within ranks in Ma'bar (Madurai) and Bengal. It is possible that Kapaya Nayaka advanced in the direction of Warangal in this period, acquiring some of its territory. Consequently, Telangana was also counted among the rebellious territories. In 1334–35, the Sultan marched on Deccan in an attempt to quell the rebellions, but his army was struck by some kind of epidemic and the Sultan himself fell gravely ill. He was forced to retreat to Delhi via Daulatabad. It is said that about a third of his army perished due to the epidemic.

Ferishta narrates that, around this time, Kapaya Nayaka approached the Hoysala ruler Veera Ballala III for assistance in evicting the Sultanate from Warangal. After consideration, assistance was offered.

Bilal Dew [Ballala], convened a meeting of his kinsmen and resolved, first, to secure the forts of his own country. and then to remove his seat of government among the mountains. Krishn Naig [Kapaya Nayak] promised, on his part also, that when their plans were ripe for execution, to raise all the Hindoos of Wurungole and Telingana and put himself at their head.... He (Bilal Dew) then raised an army and put part of it under the command of Krishn Naig, who reduced Wurungole and compelled Imad-ool-Moolk, the governor, to retreat to Dowlatabad [Daulatabad].

— Ferishta, Tarikh-i-farishti (c. 1600)

Historian R. C. Majumdar characterises it as a 'national revolt' backed up by a regular army. Governor Malik Maqbul found himself unable to withstand the rebellion and fled to Delhi. Ferishta states that Kapaya Nayaka and Ballala III then jointly marched on the newly declared Madurai Sultanate and divested it of its outlying territories, in particular Tondaimandalam.

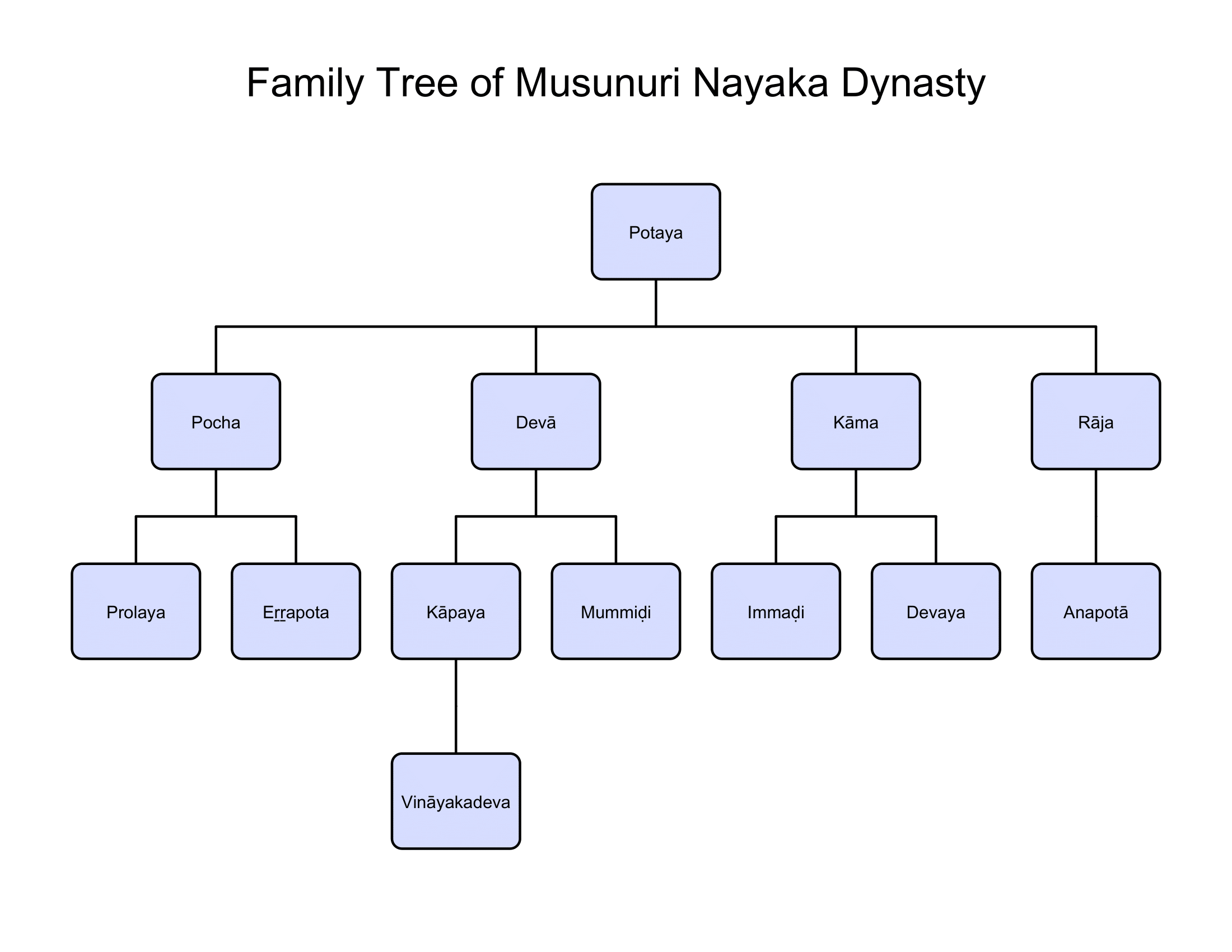
The family tree of Musunuri Nayakas as mentioned in Vuppuluri Ganapathi Sastry's Vedasāraratnāvaḷi, a two part treatise on the essence of Vedas that was written for the Endowments Department of the Government of Andhra Pradesh. These details matches with near accuracy with mentions in Indian Epigraphic reports.

=== Rule ===
Kapaya Nayaka took control of Warangal from Malik Maqbul in 1336 and thus also of a wider swathe of eastern Telangana that was governed from there. He also tried to support other rebels in the surrounding areas, although in the case of aid given to Alauddin Bahman Shah, the outcome was that his fellow rebel turned on him. Several military engagements with Bahmani Sultanate followed over a period of years, during which Kapaya Nayaka had to cede various forts and territories, including Golconda (near modern Hyderabad). His weakened position was exploited by the Reddis of Kondavidu and the Recherla Nayakas, the latter of whom killed him in battle at Bhimavaram near Warangal in 1368. (Note: Bhimavaram is now known as "Bhimaram". It is a suburb of Warangal at 18.0324°N 79.5396°E.)

Despite his supposed opposition to the Dehlavi Sultans, Kapaya Nayaka continued using the Kush Mahal built by the Sultans in Warangal and adopted the Persianised title "Sultan of the Andhra country" (Āndhra Suratrāṇa). In 1361, he gifted to the Bahmani Sultan Mohammed Shah I the Turquoise throne of Warangal, made during the Delhi rule, as part of a treaty agreement.

After the death of Kapaya Nayaka, his allied Nayakas are said to have returned to their own towns, and the period of the Musunuri family ended. The Recherla Nayakas became the dominant power in the Telangana that lasted till 1435.

== See also ==
- Reddy kingdom
- Vijayanagara Empire
- History of Andhra Pradesh
- History of Telangana
- List of Nayaka dynasties

== Bibliography ==
- Chattopadhyaya, B. D. (1998), Representing the Other? Sanskrit Sources and the Muslims, New Delhi: Manohar, ISBN 978-8173042522
- Eaton, Richard M. (2005), A Social History of the Deccan: 1300–1761, Cambridge University Press, pp. 15–16, ISBN 978-0-52125-484-7
- Jackson, Peter (2003), The Delhi Sultanate: A Political and Military History, Cambridge University Press, ISBN 978-0-521-54329-3
- Hemingway, F. R. (1915), Madras District Gazetters: Godavari, Government of Madras
- Majumdar, R. C. (1967), "Muhammad Bin Tughluq", in R. C. Majumdar; A. D. Pusalker; A. K. Majumdar (eds.), The Delhi Sultanate (Second ed.), Bharatiya Vidya Bhavan, pp. 61–89
- Prasad, J. Durga (1988), History of the Andhras up to 1565 AD, P. G. Publishers
- Rama Rao, M. (1947), "The Fall of Warangal and After", Proceedings of the Indian History Congress, 10: 292–297, JSTOR 44137150
- Somasekhara Sarma, Mallampalli (1946), History of the Reddi Kingdoms (Circa. 1325 A.D., to circa. 144B A.D.), Waltair: Andhra University
- Talbot, Cynthia (2001), Pre-colonial India in Practice: Society, Region, and Identity in Medieval Andhra: Society, Region, and Identity in Medieval Andhra, Oxford University Press, ISBN 978-0-19803-123-9
- Wagoner, Phillip B.; Rice, John Henry (2001), "From Delhi to the Deccan: Newly Discovered Tughluq Monuments at Warangal-Sult̤ānpur and the Beginnings of Indo-Islamic Architecture in Southern India", Artibus Asiae, 61 (1): 77–117, doi:10.2307/3249963, JSTOR 3249963
- Uppuluri, Ganapathi Sastry (2000), Vedasāraratnāvaḷi (in Telugu) (3rd ed.), Annavaram: Sri Veera Venkata Satyanarayana Swamivari Devasthanam
- Nelaturi, Venkataramanyya; Mallampalli, Somasekhara Sarma (1959), "Vilasa Grant of Prolaya Nayaka", Epigraphia Indica and Record of the Archaeological Survey of India, vol. 32, Dept. of Archaeology, Archaeological Survey of India
- Yadlapalli, Amarnath (2022), Andhra Bhumandaladhyaksha: Musunuri Prolayya (Rekhapally Kamma Prabhuvu), Reyaan Publishers, ISBN 9789391752156
- Yadlapalli, Amarnath (2022), Andhra Desadeeswara, Andhra Suratrana: Musunuri Kapayya (Orugallu Kamma Prabhuvu), Reyaan Publishers, ISBN 9789391752163
- Polumetla, Ananda Kumar (2024), Musunuri Nayaks: Saga of National Resurgence, Motilal Banarsidass, ISBN 9788120843455
