= Kowthalam =

- Village
- Interactive map of Kowthalam
- Location in Andhra Pradesh, India
- Coordinates: 15°46′16″N 77°07′26″E
- Country: India
- State: Andhra Pradesh
- District: Kurnool
- Talukas: Mantralayam

Population (2011)
  - Total: 11,670

Languages
  - Official: Telugu, Kannada, Urdu
- Time zone: UTC+5:30 (IST)
- PIN: 518344
- Telephone code: +91–8512
- Vehicle registration: AP

Kowthalam is a village and mandal headquarters of Kowthalam mandal , located in Kurnool district of the Indian state of Andhra Pradesh.
