= Burjor Avari =

Indian historian and educator (1938–2019)

- Born: 1938 (age 87–88); British India
- Died: 2019; Manchester

Academic background
- Education: University of Manchester

Academic work
- Institutions: Manchester Metropolitan University
- Main interests: South Asian history
- Notable works: India: The Ancient Past; Islamic Civilization in South Asia

Burjor Avari (1938–2019) was a British-Indian historian and professor of South Asian history at the Manchester Metropolitan University in the UK. He received an MBE in recognition of his work in multicultural education.

== Life and career ==
Avari was born into a Parsi family in Navsari, in modern-day Gujarat, India, in 1938 and spent his childhood in Kenya and Zanzibar. He graduated in history from the University of Manchester and obtained teacher training from the Oxford University's Institute of Education.

Avari taught history in Kenyan and British schools from 1962 to 1984. He became the team leader for developing multicultural education in the schools of Tameside in 1984. In 1988, he was appointed as a principal lecturer at Manchester Metropolitan University, where he coordinated multicultural education and taught Indian history. He was awarded the title of MBE in 1988 for his work in multicultural education.

Avari retired in 2003 and subsequently held the position of Honorary Research Fellow at the Manchester Metropolitan University.

== Works ==
Books

- India: The Ancient Past — The History of the Indian Subcontinent from 7000 BC to AD 1200, (Routledge, 2007). ISBN 9781134251629
- In Praise of Multiculturalism: Defending Diversity, (Manchester Metropolitan University, 2012), ISBN 9781905476732
- Islamic Civilization in South Asia: A history of Muslim power and presence in the Indian subcontinent, (Routledge, 2013). ISBN 9780415580618
- Interwoven World: Ideas and Encounters in History, (co-edited with George Verghese, Common Ground Publishing, Illinois, 2016). ISBN 978-1612298283

Articles

- "An Ethnocentric History of the World: The Case of Paul Johnson", (with George Gheverghese Joseph), History Workshop, Spring 1987, pp. 112–121. JSTOR 4288751
- "Race Relations Training: The State of the Art", (with George Gheverghese Joseph), Peter David Pumfrey, Gajendra K. Verma (eds) Race Relations and Urban Education: Contexts and Promising Practice, (Psychology Press, 1990). ISBN 185000711X
- "Becoming British, remaining Indian," in K. N. Malik and Peter Robb (eds) India and Britain: Recent Past and Present Challenges, (Allied Publishers, 1994)

== Reception ==
India: The Ancient Past

Bhikhu Parekh called Avari's India: The Ancient Past a balanced and well-researched book with lucid exposition. Klaus Karttunen, while noting that Avari is not a professional historian, acknowledged that he used accounts by good historians for his sources and, when the sources were in disagreement, displayed sound judgement in describing them. Muhammad Mughal of Durham University also noted that Avari's account was based on the work of well-known historians. He termed Avari's approach to the Indian subcontinent as "holistic", tracing the history of the subcontinent through the geography of regions and culture. Mughal also credited Avari for successfully eliminating the perception that India has been isolated from the rest of the world by describing the intercultural communication that has left a mark on India's cultural patterns.

Islamic Civilization in South Asia

Francis Robinson of Royal Holloway called Islamic Civilization in South Asia a story extremely well told, stating that, working in heavily contested areas of history, Avari provided a well-balanced exposition. Muhammad Mughal welcomed Avari's attempts to explore Muslim history in South Asia. He called his approach "innovative, comprehensive and unique in style". He pointed out that the book sheds light on the peace-loving and multicultural aspects of South Asian Muslims, which are often overlooked in political rhetoric.
