= Mohammed Shah I =

Sultan of the Bahmani Sultanate from 1358 to 1375

- Muhammed Shah Bahmani I
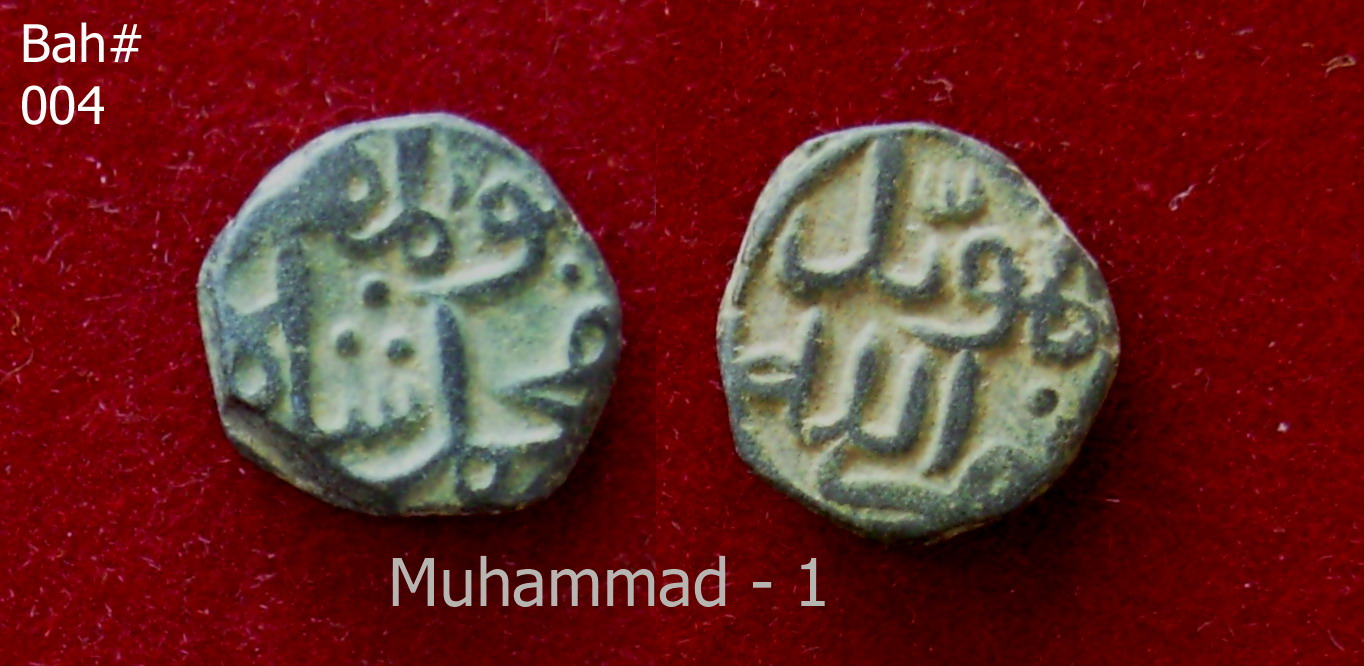
- A copper coin of Mohammed Shah I

2nd Bahmani Sultan
- Reign: 11 February 1358 – 21 April 1375
- Predecessor: Ala-ud-Din Bahman Shah
- Successor: Mujahid Shah
- Died: 21 April 1375
- Issue: Ala-ud-Din Mujahid Shah, Ruh Parwar Agha
- Father: Ala-ud-Din Bahman Shah

Mohammed Shah I (died 21 April 1375) was the second ruler of the Bahmani Sultanate, a late medieval kingdom of India. He succeeded his father Ala-ud-Din Bahman Shah. He initiated the Bahmani–Vijayanagar War with two neighboring kingdoms, the Vijayanagara and the Warangal under Kapaya Nayaka, and successfully subjugated them. He was succeeded by his son Alauddin Mujahid Shah.

== Reign ==
When Mohammad inherited the newly born sultanate from his father Alauddin, the land was still infested with thieves and robbers. As such he spent the entire part of his reign in establishing law in his land. He ordered his governors to never give refuge to anyone who defied his authority. This campaign was successful and at the end of his reign, the land became peaceful and law-abiding. He also sat on the takht-ē-firoza or The Turquoise throne which was gifted to him by Kapaya Nayaka.

During his time, he built the Jamia mosque of Gulbarga with the help of a Persian architect named Rafi of Qazvin in 1367.

Like his father, Mohammed was involved in wars with Vijayanagara. However he also became embroiled in wars with Warangal. Mohammed died in 1375 due to alcoholic addiction.

== Bibliography ==
- Sherwani, H K (1946), The Bahmanis of Deccan-An Objective Study
