= Ala-ud-Din Bahman Shah =

Sultan of the Bahmani Sultanate from 1347 to 1358

- Ala-ud-Din Bahman Shah

1st Bahmani Sultan
- Reign: 3 August 1347 – 10 February 1358
- Predecessor: Position established (Ismail Mukh)
- Successor: Mohammed Shah I
- Born: Zafar Khan; 1290–1292; Ghazni (present-day Afghanistan)
- Died: 10 February 1358 (aged 65–68)
- Burial: Haft Gumbaz
- Issue: Sultan Muhammed Shah I, Prince Mahmud, Prince Dawood
Regnal name
- Ala-ud-din Hasan

Ala-ud-Din Hasan Bahman Shah (born Zafar Khan; Persian: علاء الدين بهمن شاه; 1290–1292 – 10 February 1358) was the founder and Sultan of the Bahmani Sultanate from 3 August 1347 until his death in 1358.

== Ancestry and early life ==
The precise origin and early life of Hasan Gangu, later known as Ala-ud-Din Bahman Shah, are disputed. Contemporary and later sources provide conflicting accounts of his birthplace, ancestry, and social background.

The contemporary historian Abd-al-Malik Isami states that Hasan was born in Ghazni, in present-day Afghanistan. Other accounts have consequently described him as being of Afghan or Turkic origin. Firishta, however, while stating that Hasan was “by birth an Afghan”, rejected the genealogical traditions connecting him to the ancient Persian king Bahman and stated that his origins were too obscure to be reliably traced.

Another tradition, recorded by Firishta and discussed by R. C. Majumdar, states that Hasan was a native of Delhi and a servant of a Brahmin named Gangu. According to this account, Hasan was cultivating a field when he discovered a copper pot containing gold coins, which he handed over to his master. Impressed by his honesty, Gangu brought him to the attention of the Sultan, who appointed him to the command of one hundred horsemen. Gangu, who was an astrologer, is also said to have predicted Hasan’s future greatness. Majumdar discusses this tradition while describing Hasan’s origins as obscure and emphasizing his humble beginnings. Some later sources explicitly describe Hasan as a convert to Islam. Anna Suvorova, in Masnavi: A Study of Urdu Romance, describes Hasan Gangu as a “newly converted” Muslim in her discussion of the Bahmani tradition. Jayanta Gadakari’s Hindu-Muslim Communalism: A Panchnama goes further and explicitly describes Hasan Gangu as a Brahmin who converted to Islam.

In 1339, Zafar Khan participated in an uprising against the Tughlaqs. (Note: In 1335, Jalaluddin Ahsan Khan (r. 1335–1339), the governor of the province of Ma'bar (with its capital at Madurai ruling Tiruchirappalli and parts of South Arcot), declared independence. He struck coins in his own name and stopped sending tribute to Delhi, betting on the fact that Madurai was the most distant province from the Sultan's reach amid widespread rebellions triggered by Muhammad bin Tughluq's unpopular policies such as the forced capital shift to Daulatabad and the introduction of token money.) This turned out unsuccessful; he and his allies were exiled to Afghanistan the same year. He managed to return to the Deccan, and in 1346 he participated in a siege of Gulbarga, at the time under Tughlaq control. The siege proved successful and he was made a governor.

Zafar Khan rose to power during the Rebellion of Ismail Mukh and in 1347 he was made commander of an army in Daulatabad. On 3 August 1347, the Afghan noble Nasir-ud-Din Ismail Shah, also known as Ismail Mukh, whom the rebel amirs of the Deccan placed on the throne of Daulatabad in 1345, abdicated in favor of Zafar Khan, resulting in the establishment of the Bahmani Sultanate with its headquarters at Hasanabad (Gulbarga). He was in charge of a three city jagir, with his main rule at Miraj.

== Military campaigns ==
Ala-ud-din Bahman Shah aspired to expand his dominion as far as Rameswaram, Ma'abar, or the Coromandel Coast, and subsequently aimed to conquer territories such as Malwa, Gujarat, Gwalior, and Delhi itself. However, his advisor, Malik Saifuddin Ghori, cautioned against this endeavor, citing the dense jungles and challenging terrain in the southern regions as unsuitable for a successful campaign. Instead, Malik advised the king to first pacify the Deccan plateau before advancing towards Malwa and Gujarat. Following this counsel, the king directed his military commanders to subdue various areas in the Deccan still held by those opposing his rule. Husain Gurshasp was tasked with Kotgir and Qandhar (Nanded), Raziud-din Qutb ul-Mulk with the southwest, Malik Maqbul (now Qir Khan) with Kalyani, Sikandar Khan with Telangana, and Ainu’d-din Kwaja-i Jahan led the army from Miraj to Gulbarga.

=== Capture of Kodgir ===
The initial campaign was led by Gurshasp, who learned en route to Kodgir that the Tughlaq garrison stationed at Qandhar had switched allegiance to a new ruler, prompting the Hindu general Akraj to flee into the forests. Gurshasp then proceeded towards Qandhar, where he personally accepted the garrison's allegiance on behalf of Ala-ud-din Bahman Shah. Subsequently, he advanced towards Kodgir, compelling its garrison to surrender and securing the city without resorting to plunder, opting instead to safeguard both the city and its populace.

=== Subjugation of Southwest region ===
Qutb ul-Mulk, dispatched to the southwest, successfully seized control of Maram, Mahendri, and Akkalkot, renaming the latter as Sayedabad. He issued a decree granting pardon to all who pledged allegiance. Furthermore, Qutb returned all confiscated possessions to their rightful owners and ensured the safety of local Hindu landlords. He strictly prohibited any plunder by his troops. Despite commanding a relatively small army, Qutb ul-Mulk's efficient leadership brought the entire region under the protection of Daulatabad.

=== Siege of Kalyan fort ===
Qir Khan embarked on the mission to seize the formidable Kalyan fort, later known as the Basavakalyan fort, but encountered resistance as it was unprepared to yield. Following a grueling five-month siege, the Tughlaq garrison finally capitulated. Qir Khan accepted their surrender, ensuring the safety of all lives and properties within the fort.

== Reign ==
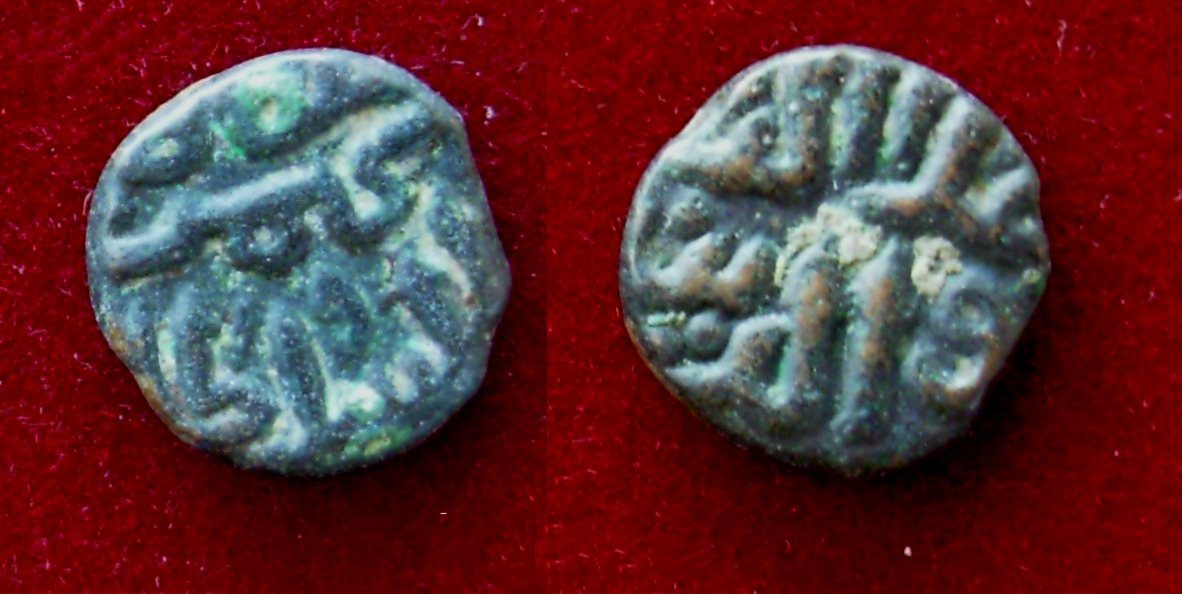
Coin issued by Bahman Shah

Upon establishing an independent kingdom, Zafar Khan took the title of Abu'l-Muzaffar Ala-ud-din Bahman Shah. He gave Ismail Mukh a jagir near Jamkhandi and later conferred to him the highest title of his kingdom, Amir-ul-Umara. But Narayana, a local Hindu chieftain still succeeded in turning Ismail against Bahman Shah for a short period before he poisoned Ismail.

Bahman Shah led his first campaign against Warangal in 1350 and forced its ruler Kapaya Nayaka to cede to him the fortress of Kaulas. His kingdom was divided into four provinces and he appointed a governor for each province. During his reign Hasan fought many wars with Vijayanagara. By the time of his death the kingdom stretched from north to south from the Wainganga River to Krishna and east to west from Bhongir to Daulatabad.

He was succeeded by his son Mohammed Shah I after his death in 1358.

== Sources ==
- Avari, Burjor (2013), Islamic Civilization in South Asia: A history of Muslim power and presence in the Indian subcontinent, Routledge, ISBN 978-0-415-58061-8
- Bhattacharya, Sachchidananada (1972), A Dictionary of Indian History, Westport: Greenwood Press
- Chandra, Satish (2004), Medieval India: From Sultanat to the Mughals-Delhi Sultanat (1206–1526) – Part One, Har-Anand Publications, ISBN 978-81-241-1064-5
- Kulke, Hermann; Rothermund, Dietmar (2004), A History of India (Fourth ed.), Routledge, ISBN 9780415329194
- Majumdar, Ramesh Chandra (1967), The Delhi Sultanate, Bharatiya Vidya Bhavan
- Briggs, John, ed. (1909), History of the Mohommedan powers in india till 1612, Vol 2
- Sherwani, H K, ed. (1946), History of the Bahmani dynasty-An Objective study

Ala-ud-Din Bahman Shah
Regnal titles
| New title Dynasty founded | Bahmani Sultan; 3 August 1347 – 10 February 1358 | Succeeded by Mohammed Shah I |
