= Appa-kavi =

Kakunuri Appa-kavi
- కాకునూరి అప్పకవి
- Citizenship: Vijayanagara Empire (in present-day southern India)
- Occupation: Poet
- Writing career
- Language: Telugu
- Period: 17th century
- Notable work: Appakavīyamu

Kākunūri Appa-kavi (Telugu: కాకునూరి అప్పకవి) was a Telugu language poet and grammarian from present-day southern India, noted for writing the Telugu grammar book Appakavīyamu (1656 CE). He claims to have written the book at the instruction of the god Vishnu, based on a purported Sanskrit language work by the earlier poet Nannaya.

== Biography ==
Appa-kavi belonged to a Brahmin family from Kakunur (near Mahbubnagar) in present-day Telangana. Unlike other notable contemporary or earlier Telugu poets, he did not have any royal patron: his family was apparently independently wealthy. His grandfather and father were scholars like him, and he describes his father Venganna as marata-brahma ("a second creator"). The surviving parts of Appakavīyamu suggest that Appa-kavi had knowledge of Vedic sciences, astrology, Agama literature, poetics, linguistics, and philosophy.

Several works are attributed to Appa-kavi, but all of these except two chapters of Appakavīyamu are now lost. The lost works attributed to Appa-kavi include Ambika-vadamu (a yakshagana) and Ananta-vrata-kalpa (a kavya). The 19th century scholar Chinnaya Suri connected himself to the lineage of Appa-kavi.

== Appakavīyamu ==
It's a joy when a woman or a poem
comes naturally to you.
If you force them, they bring you grief.

— Appa-kavi in Appakavīyamu

Appa-kavi's Appakavīyamu is a work on grammar, and scholars Velcheru Narayana Rao and David Shulman call him "perhaps the most influential grammarian in Telugu". Only two chapters of this text survive - those on phonology and metrics.

In his introduction to Appakavīyamu, Appa-kavi narrates the following legend: when he was living in the Kamepalli village in the Palnadu region (probably in present-day Guntur district), he had declared his intention to write a book. One evening, in the Shaka year 1578 (1656 CE), he worshipped Krishna and talked to scholars about the Puranas before going to sleep. That night, the god Vishnu appeared in his dream, and told him that the earlier poet Nannaya had composed a Sanskrit-language work on Telugu grammar, with help of Narayana-bhatta. This work, titled Andhra-shabda-chintamani ("Magic Jewel of Telugu Words"), contained five chapters with 82 verses in the Arya metre. Using the rules outlined in this book, Nannaya composed Mahabharata, the first poem in the Telugu language. Bhimana, who was jealous of Nannaya, stole and destroyed Andhra-shabda-chintamani by throwing it in the Godavari River. Since no Telugu grammar rules now survived, a well-known poet from Dakshavati made a rule that a poet should use a word only if it is attested in Nannaya's Mahabharata. The subsequent great poets, such as Tikkana, adhered to this rule. Tatana (Vellanki Tatam Bhattu who wrote Sulakshana-saramu) and Nutana-Dandi (Ketana) covered a little Telugu grammar, but their works were not comparable to that of Nannaya. Unknown to others, King Rajaraja-narendra's son Saranga-dhara, an immortal siddha, had memorized Nannaya's grammar. He gave a written copy of Nannaya's work to Bala-sarasvati near Matanga Hill (at Vijayanagara), and Bala-sarasvati wrote a Telugu gloss (commentary) on the work. Vishnu told Appa-kavi that next morning, a Brahmin from Matanga Hill would visit him and give him a copy of Nannaya's work. Vishnu asked Appa-kavi to elaborate Nannaya's work in Telugu language. Appa-kavi's maternal relatives, who included noted authors, convinced him to write the book. He then composed Appakavīyamu, and dedicated the book to Vishnu.

A similar legend about Nannaya's purportedly lost work appears in Yelakuchi Bala-sarasvati's Bala-sarasvatiyamu, which Appa-kavi describes as the basis of his own commentary. While some of the grammatical sutras in Appa-kavi's work may be from Nannaya's time, Andhra-shabda-chintamani is an imaginary work, and was probably fabricated by Bala-sarasvati himself. Although Appa-kavi describes his work as a commentary, it is really an original work. Appa-kavi's legend about the loss and recovery of Nannaya's purported work is either an embellished version of the legend mentioned in Bala-sarasvatiyamu or a fuller version of an existing legend. Ahobala-panditiya (also known as Kavi-shiro-bhushana), a Sanskrit commentary on Andhra-shabda-chintamani, also retells this story, and notes the discrepancies between the works of Bala-sarasvati and Appa-kavi.

Appa-kavi's work is rooted in the traditional conception that poetic syllables have the power to create and change reality, such as to kill a person or to bring a person back to life. He states that each syllable is presided over by a deity, and aims to teach aspiring poets how to use the syllables properly.

Appa-kavi declares that out of millions of people who have lived, only the names of the ones mentioned by the poets survive. He states that poetry is the best of all good things, and "all the marks of good poetry" can be seen in his book. According to Appa-kavi, a man can free his generations from hell if he creates one of these seven things: a son, a water tank, a poem, an endowment, a temple, a grove, and a Brahmin settlement. He states that except poetry, all of these things fall into ruin over time, and only the things described in a poetry book can "move through the world".

According to him, an ideal poet is a Brahmin who possesses a peaceful mind, faithfulness towards his teacher, purity, imagination, skills in the ways of the past great poets, and a gentle heart. He states that a poem written by a Shudra poet should be outright rejected. Writer Narla Venkateswara Rao notes that such attitude was among the reasons responsible for the works of Shudra poets like Vemana being ignored.
