= Telugu people =

Dravidian ethnic group

Teluguvāru తెలుగువారు
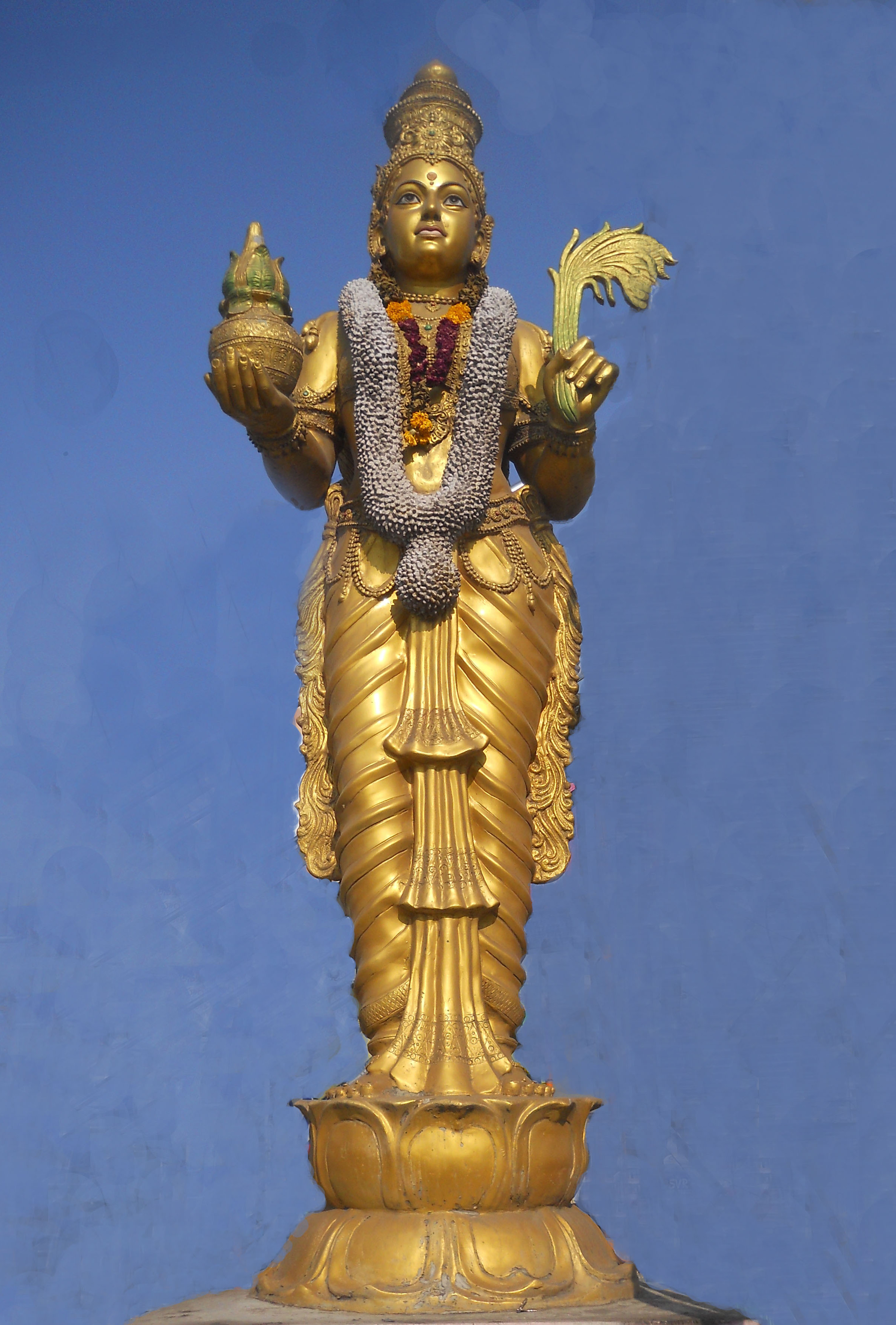
- Telugu Talli, the personification of Telugu people and culture

Total population
- c. 104.5 million (Estimate of Telugu speakers in 2024)

Regions with significant populations
- Majority; Andhra Pradesh; Telangana; Yanam; Minority; Tamil Nadu; Karnataka; Maharashtra; Odisha; Chhattisgarh; Pondicherry; West Bengal
- India: 81,127,740 (2011 Census)
- United States: 515,430 (Telugu Americans)
- Malaysia: 500,000 (Malaysian Telugus)
- United Arab Emirates: 408,000
- Saudi Arabia: 383,000
- Myanmar: 200,000
- Australia: 90,400
- Canada: 74,685
- Bangladesh: 40,000
- United Kingdom: 33,000
- Fiji: 34,000
- Mauritius: 20,000
- Bahrain: 18,700
- Oman: 13,300
- New Zealand: 5,754
- South Africa: 5,000
- Germany: 23000
- France: 20000
- Thailand: 15000 (Estimated)
- Netherlands: 12000 (Estimated)
- China: 5000
- Sri Lanka: 40,000 (Sri Lankan Telugus)
- Israel: 4000
- Japan: 2000(Estimated)
- Sweden: 3000
- Switzerland: 3000
- Mexico: 3000
- Ukraine: 2500 (Estimated)
- Hong Kong: 2500 (Estimated)
- Scotland: 2500 (Estimated)
- Italy: 4000 (Estimated)
- Denmark: 2000 (Estimated)
- Russia: 2000 (Estimated)
- Austria: 2000 (Estimated)
- Norway: 2000 (Estimated)
- Singapore: 40,000
- Caribbean: 150,000 (Estimated)

Languages
- Telugu

Religion
- Majority: Hinduism; Minority: Christianity, Islam, Buddhism

Related ethnic groups
- Other Dravidian peoples South Indians

- Person: Telugu
- People: Teluguvāru
- Language: Telugu
- Country: Telugu Dēśaṁ

Telugus, (Note: Telugu: తెలుగువారు, romanized: Teluguvāru) also known by the ethnonym Āndhras, are a Dravidian ethnic group native to the southern Indian states of Andhra Pradesh and Telangana, and the union territory of Puducherry (Yanam district). They natively speak the Telugu language and form the most populous Dravidian linguistic group. A significant number of Telugus also reside in the Indian states of Karnataka, Tamil Nadu, Odisha, Chhattisgarh, West Bengal and Maharashtra; with a significant diasporic population spread across the Western world, with larger concentrations in North America, the Far East, Mauritius, the Gulf Arab states, Malaysia, Burma, Australia and other parts of the world, Telugu is the 4th most spoken language in India with 96 million speakers in the country and 14th most spoken language in the World with 110 million speakers across the globe.

Telugu is the fourth most spoken language in India and the 14th most spoken native language in the world. Telugu is the fastest-growing language in the United States. It is also a protected language in South Africa.

Andhra is an ethnonym used for Telugu people since antiquity. The earliest mention of the Andhras occurs in Aitareya Brahmana (c. 800 BCE) of the Rigveda. In the Mahabharata, the infantry of Satyaki was composed of a tribe called the Andhras, known for their long hair, tall stature, sweet language, and mighty prowess. They were also mentioned in the Buddhist Jataka tales. Megasthenes reported in his Indica (c. 310 BCE) that the Andhras, living in the Godavari and Krishna river deltas, were famous for their formidable military strength, which was second only to that of the Maurya Empire in the entire Indian subcontinent. The first major Andhra polity was the Satavahana dynasty (2nd century BCE–2nd century CE) which ruled over the entire Deccan plateau and even distant areas of western and central India. They established trade relations with the Roman Empire, and their capital city near Amaravathi was the most prosperous city in India during the 2nd century CE. Inscriptions in Old Telugu script (Vengi script) were found as far away as Indonesia and Myanmar.

In the 13th century, Kakatiyas unified various Telugu-speaking areas under one realm. Later, Telugu culture and literature flourished and reached its zenith during the late Vijayanagara Empire. After the fall of the Vijayanagara Empire, various Telugu rulers called Nayakas established independent kingdoms across South India serving the same function as Rajput warriors clans of northern India. Kandyan Nayaks, the last dynasty to rule Sri Lanka were of Telugu descent. In this era, Telugu became the language of high culture throughout South India. Vijaya Ramaswamy compared it to the overwhelming dominance of French as the cultural language of modern Europe during roughly the same era. Telugu also predominates in the evolution of Carnatic music, one of two main subgenres of Indian classical music.

The architecture developed by Andhras in Krishna river valley in early first centuries CE, called the Amaravati School of Art, is regarded as one of the three major styles of ancient Indian art and had a great influence on art in South India, Sri Lanka, and Southeast Asia. Mahayana, the predominant Buddhist tradition in China, Japan, and Korea and the largest Buddhist denomination in the world, was developed among Telugus in Andhra.

Telugu is one of six languages designated as a classical language by the Government of India. It has been in use as an official language for over 1,400 years and has an unbroken and diverse literary tradition of over a thousand years. Telugu performing arts include the classical dance form Kuchipudi, as well as Perini Sivatandavam, and Burra Katha. The Telugu shadow puppetry tradition, Tholu Bommalata, dates back to the 3rd century BCE, and is the ancestor of Wayang, the popular Indonesian art form that has been a staple of Indonesian tourism. Telugu cinema is the largest film industry in India in terms of box office as well as admissions. The industry has produced some of India's most expensive and highest-grossing films, influencing Indian popular culture well beyond Telugu-speaking regions.

== Etymology ==
=== Telugu ===
Speakers of Telugu refer to it as simply Telugu. Older forms of the name include Teluṅgu and Tenuṅgu. Tenugu is derived from the Proto-Dravidian word *ten ("south") to mean "the people who lived in the south/southern direction". The name Telugu, then, is a result of an "n" to "l" alternation established in Telugu.

P. Chenchiah and Bhujanga Rao note that Atharvana Acharya in the 13th century wrote a grammar of Telugu, calling it the Trilinga Shabdānushāsana (or Trilinga Grammar). However, most scholars note that Atharvana's grammar was titled Atharvana Karikavali. Appa Kavi in the 17th century explicitly wrote that Telugu was derived from Trilinga. Scholar Charles P. Brown made a comment that it was a "strange notion" since the predecessors of Appa Kavi had no knowledge of such a derivation.

George Abraham Grierson and other linguists doubt this derivation, holding rather that Telugu was the older term and Trilinga must be the later Sanskritisation of it. If so the derivation itself must have been quite ancient because Triglyphum, Trilingum and Modogalingam are attested in ancient Greek sources, the last of which can be interpreted as a Telugu rendition of "Trilinga".

=== Andhras ===
Andhras is an ethnonym used for Telugu people since antiquity. The name Andhras has been consistently used since the Iron Age to refer to the Telugu people in ancient Hindu and Buddhist texts. They were mentioned as Dasyus (non-Aryans) living on the fringes of Aryan settlements. The Aitareya Brahmana of the Rigveda (c. 800 BCE) refers to the Andhras as descendants of Sage Vishvamitra. The Greek historian Megasthenes, in his Indica (c. 310 BCE), described the Andhras as a distinct race.

Iravatham Mahadevan, notes that since most Dravidian-speaking men had names ending with the suffIx -(a)nṟ, the Dravidian etymon -(a)nṟ was borrowed as a loanword into Indo-Aryan as andha and later as āndhra to denote the name of the neighbouring Dravidian-speaking people.

== History ==
=== Ancient era ===
Andhras (Telugu: ఆంధ్రులు) were mentioned in the Hindu texts such as Aitareya Brahmana (c. 800 BCE) of the Rigveda. According to Aitareya Brahmana, the sage Vishvamitra had hundred sons; fifty of them were older than Madhuchhanda, and fifty were younger. The older ones were not pleased with (the installation of Sunahsepa to the primogeniture). Visvamitra then pronounced against them a curse: “You shall have the lowest castes for your descendants. ” Therefore, are many of the most degraded classes of men, the rabble for the most part, such as the Andhras, Pundras, Sabaras, Palindas, and Mutibas, descendants of Visvamitra....” All of those tribes are referred to as Dasyus, or non-Aryans living on the fringes of Aryan settlements.

Andhra was a kingdom mentioned in the epics Ramayana and Mahabharata. Andhra communities are also mentioned in the Vayu, Skanda, Markandeya and Matsya Purana. In the Mahabharata the infantry of Satyaki was composed by a tribe called Andhras, known for their long hair, tall stature, sweet language, and mighty prowess. They lived along the banks of the Godavari river. Andhras and Kalingas supported the Kauravas during the Mahabharata war. Sahadeva defeated the kingdoms of Pandya, Andhra, Kalinga, Dravida, Odra and Chera while performing the Rajasuya Yajna. Buddhist references to Andhras are also found. They were also mentioned in the Mahabharata and Buddhist Jataka tales.

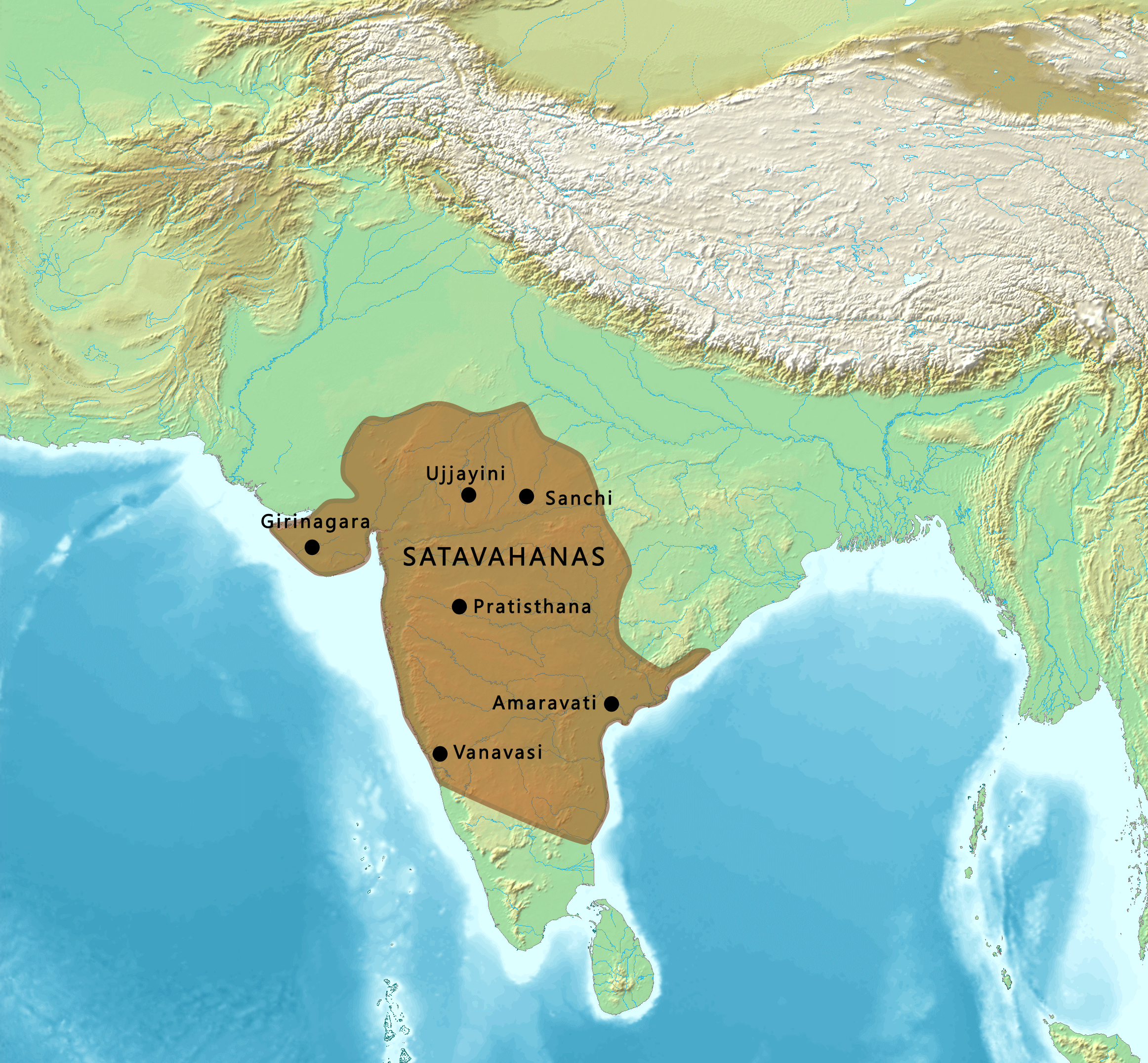
Approximate extent of the Satavahana Empire (Andhra Empire) in the late 1st century CE.

Andhra was also a Vedic Janapada (c. 1100–600 BCE) which were the prominent realms, republics (ganapada), and kingdoms (sāmarājya) of the Vedic period in the Indian subcontinent. In the seventh century BCE, Asmaka was one of the sixteen Mahajanapadas. Andhras were mentioned by Megasthenes in his Indica (c. 310 BCE) as being second only to Mauryans in military strength in the entire Indian subcontinent. They had 30 fortified towns along the Godavari River and an army of 1,00,000 infantry, 2,000 cavalry and 1,000 elephants. They are mentioned at the time of the death of the great Mauryan King Ashoka in 232 BCE.

The first major Andhra polity was the Satavahana dynasty (2nd century BCE–2nd century CE) which ruled over the entire Deccan plateau and established trade relations with the Roman Empire. The kingdom reached its zenith under Gautamiputra Satakarni. Their capital city, Amaravati was the most prosperous city in India in 2nd century CE. At the end of the Satavahana rule, the Telugu region was divided into Kingdoms ruled by lords. In the late second century CE, the Andhra Ikshvakus ruled the eastern region along the Krishna River. During the fourth century, the Pallava dynasty extended their rule across southern Andhra Pradesh and Tamilakam and established their capital at Kanchipuram. Their power increased during the reigns of Mahendravarman I (571–630) and Narasimhavarman I (630–668). The Pallavas dominated the southern Telugu-speaking region and northern Tamilakam until the end of the ninth century. Later, various dynasties have ruled the area, including the Salankayanas, Cholas, Vishnukundinas and Eastern Chalukyas.

=== Medieval era ===
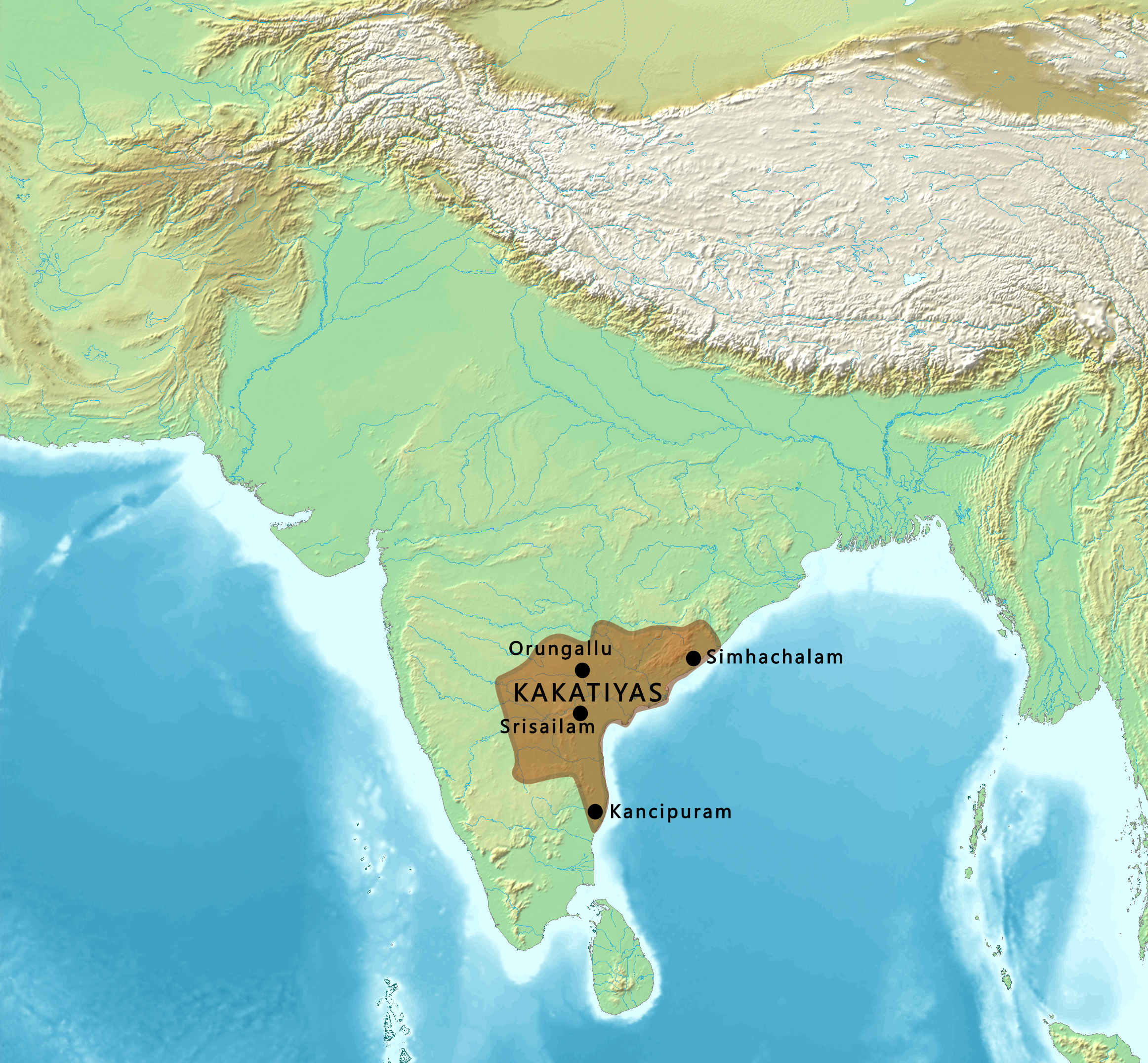
Map of the Kakatiyas, circa 1150–1300 CE.

Extent of Vijayanagara Empire, around 1520 CE.

Between 1163 and 1323, the Kakatiya dynasty emerged, bringing the distinct upland and lowland cultures of Telugu lands, which brought into being a feeling of cultural affinity between those who spoke the Telugu language. Kakatiya era also saw the development of a distinct style of architecture which improved and innovated upon the existing modes. Most notable examples are the Thousand Pillar Temple in Hanamkonda, Ramappa Temple in Palampet, Warangal Fort, Golconda Fort and Kota Gullu in Ghanpur. During this period, the Telugu language emerged as a literary medium with the writings of Nannaya, Tikkana, Eranna, Pothana etc. are the translators and poets of the great Hindu epics like Ramayana, Mahabharatha, Bhagavatha etc.

Telingana, a term referring to the land inhabited by Telugus, was first used during the 14th century CE. In 1323, the sultan of Delhi, Ghiyath al-Din Tughluq, sent a large army commanded by Ulugh Khan (later, as Muhammad bin Tughluq, the Delhi sultan) to conquer the Telugu region and lay siege to Warangal. The fall of the Kakatiya dynasty led to an era with competing influences from the Turkic kingdoms of Delhi and the Persio-Tajik sultanate of central India. The struggle for Andhra ended with the victory of the Musunuri Nayaks over the Turkic Delhi Sultanate.

The Telugus achieved independence under Krishnadevaraya of the Vijayanagara Empire (1336–1646). The Qutb Shahi dynasty of the Bahmani Sultanate succeeded that empire. The Qutub Shahis were tolerant of Telugu culture from the early 16th to the end of the 17th centuries.

=== Modern era ===
The arrival of Europeans (the French under the Marquis de Bussy-Castelnau and the English under Robert Clive) altered polity of the region. In 1765, Clive and the chief and council at Visakhapatnam obtained the Northern Circars from Mughal emperor Shah Alam. The British achieved supremacy when they defeated Maharaja Vijaya Rama Gajapati Raju of Vizianagaram in 1792.

Andhra's modern foundation was laid in the struggle for Indian independence. India became independent from the United Kingdom in 1947. Potti Sreeramulu's campaign for a state independent of the Madras Presidency and Tanguturi Prakasam Panthulu and Kandukuri Veeresalingam's social-reform movements led to the formation of Andhra State, with Kurnool as its capital and freedom-fighter Prakasam Pantulu as its first chief minister. Andhra, the first Indian state formed primarily on a linguistic basis, was carved from the Madras Presidency in 1953. Although the Muslim Nizam of Hyderabad wanted to retain independence from India, he was forced to cede his kingdom to the Dominion of India in 1948 to form Hyderabad State. In 1956, Andhra State was merged with the Telugu-speaking portion of Hyderabad State (the Telangana region) to create the state of Andhra Pradesh. The Lok Sabha approved the formation of Telangana from ten northwestern districts of Andhra Pradesh on 18 February 2014.

== Culture ==
=== Cuisine ===
Different regions of Andhra Pradesh and Telangana all produce distinctive variations of Telugu cuisine. Telugu cuisine is generally known for its tangy, hot, and spicy taste. Andhra Pradesh is the leading producer of red chili and rice in India. The concentration of red chili production in Andhra Pradesh has led to the liberal use of spices in Andhra cuisine. Rice is the staple in Telugu culture along with Ragi (రాగి) which is popular in Rayalaseema and Palnadu regions.

=== Language ===
Telugu is a South-Central Dravidian language primarily spoken in the states of Andhra Pradesh and Telangana, where it is also the official language. The oldest inscriptions with Telugu words date to 400 BCE found at Bhattiprolu in Guntur district. Other early inscriptions with more refined language were found in Kantamanenivarigudem, Guntupalli in West Godavari district and Gummadidurru and Ghantasala in Krishna district. The earliest inscription completely written in Telugu dates to 575 CE were found at Kalamalla village in Kadapa district.

=== Literature ===
Telugu has an unbroken and diverse literary tradition of over a thousand years. The earliest Telugu literature dates to 11th century CE with Nannaya's Andhra Mahabharatam. The language experienced a golden age under the patronage of the Vijayanagara king-poet Krishnadevaraya.

=== Performing arts ===
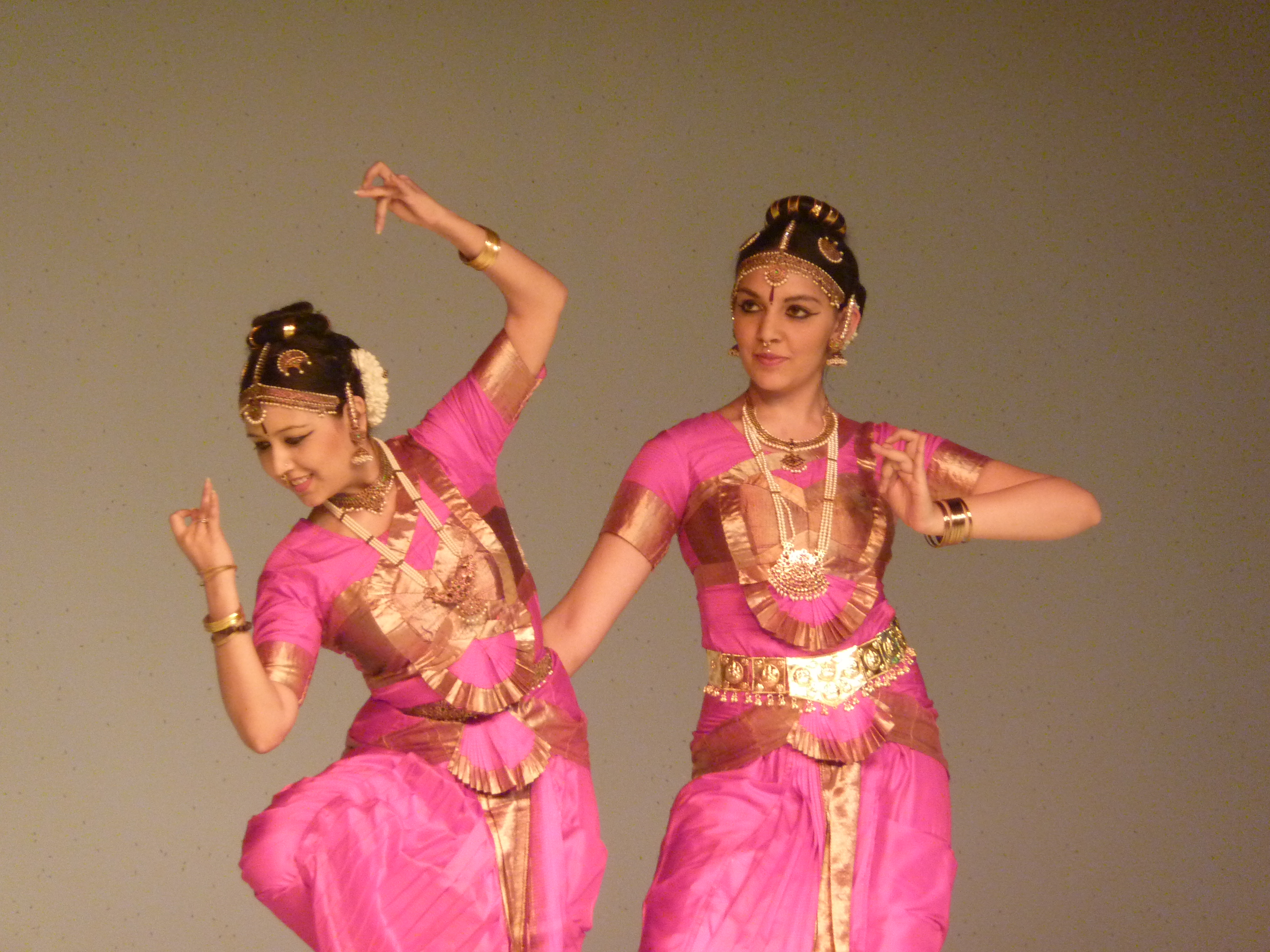
Two Kuchipudi dancers from Andhra Pradesh, 2011

Kuchipudi, originating from the eponymous village in Krishna district, is of the eight major Indian classical dances. It is a dance-drama performance, with its roots in the ancient Hindu Sanskrit text of Natya Shastra. It developed as a religious art linked to traveling bards, temples and spiritual beliefs, like all major classical dances of India. Other Telugu performing arts include:

- Andhra Natyam
- Vilasini Natyam
- Nava Janardhanam
- Perini Sivatandavam
- Oggu Katha
- Burra Katha
- Tholu Bommalata

=== Architecture ===
==== Amaravati School of Art ====
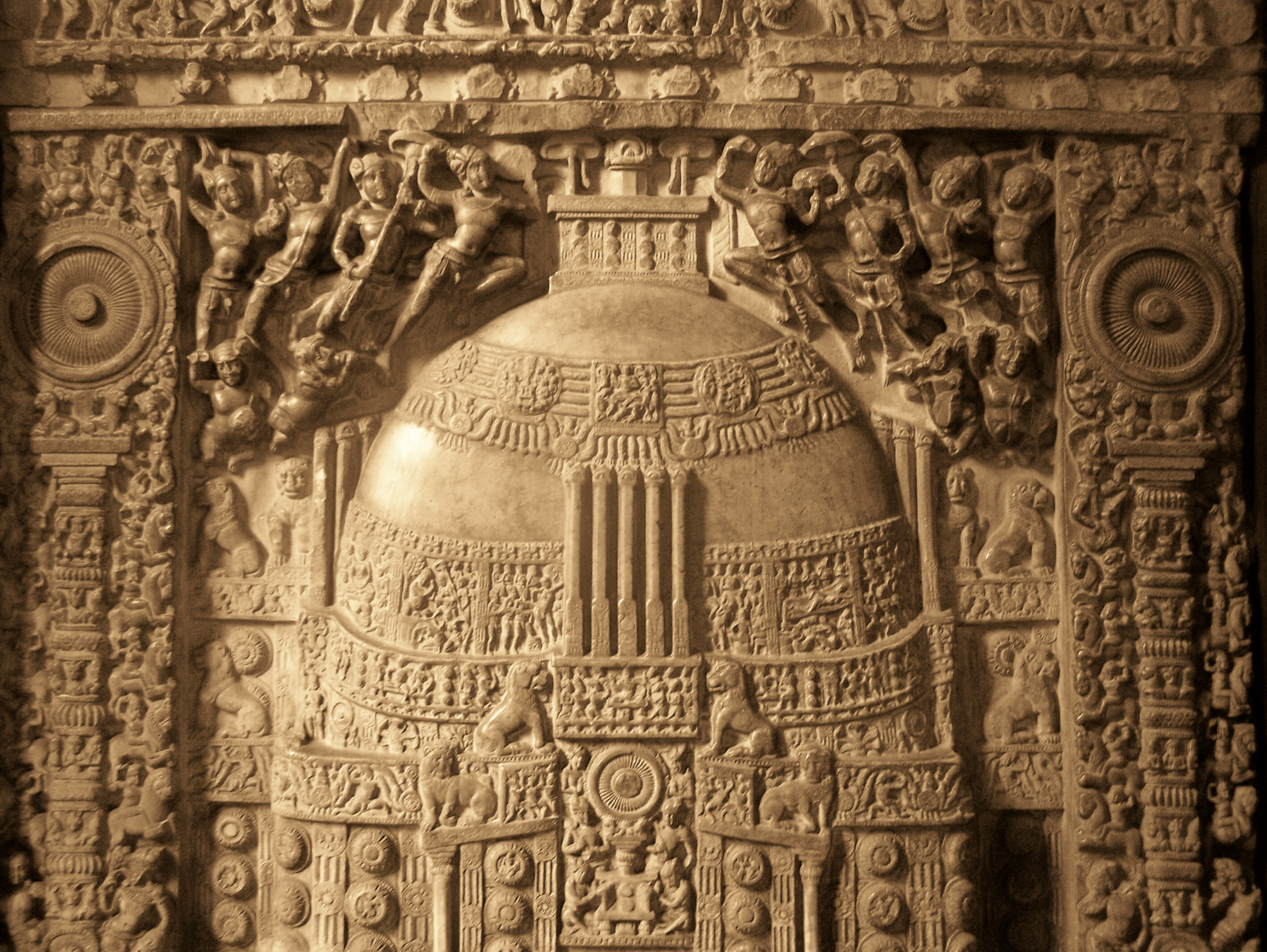
Amaravati Stupa relief at a museum (1st–2nd century CE)

Amaravati School of Art is an ancient Indian art style that evolved in the region of Amaravati (then known as Dhānyakaṭaka) from 2nd century BCE to the end of the 3rd century CE. It is also called the Andhra School or Vengi School. Art historians regard the art of Amaravati as one of the three major styles or schools of ancient Indian art, the other two being the Mathura style, and the Gandharan style. Amaravati school flourished under the local Sada rulers, Satavahanas, and Andhra Ikshvakus till 325–340 CE. Amaravati Stupa is the most famous monument of this style, and it was for some time "the greatest monument in Buddhist Asia", and "the jewel in the crown of early Indian art". Apart from Amaravati, the style is also found in Nagarjunakonda and Chandavaram Buddhist site.

Largely because of the maritime trading links of the East Indian coast, the Amaravati school of sculpture had great influence on art in South India, Sri Lanka, and South-East Asia. Buddha image in sculptures which later on became the prototype of images in different Buddhist countries was standardised here. The Amaravati style of Buddha image retained its popularity in Sri Lanka till the 12th century.

==== Kakatiya architecture ====
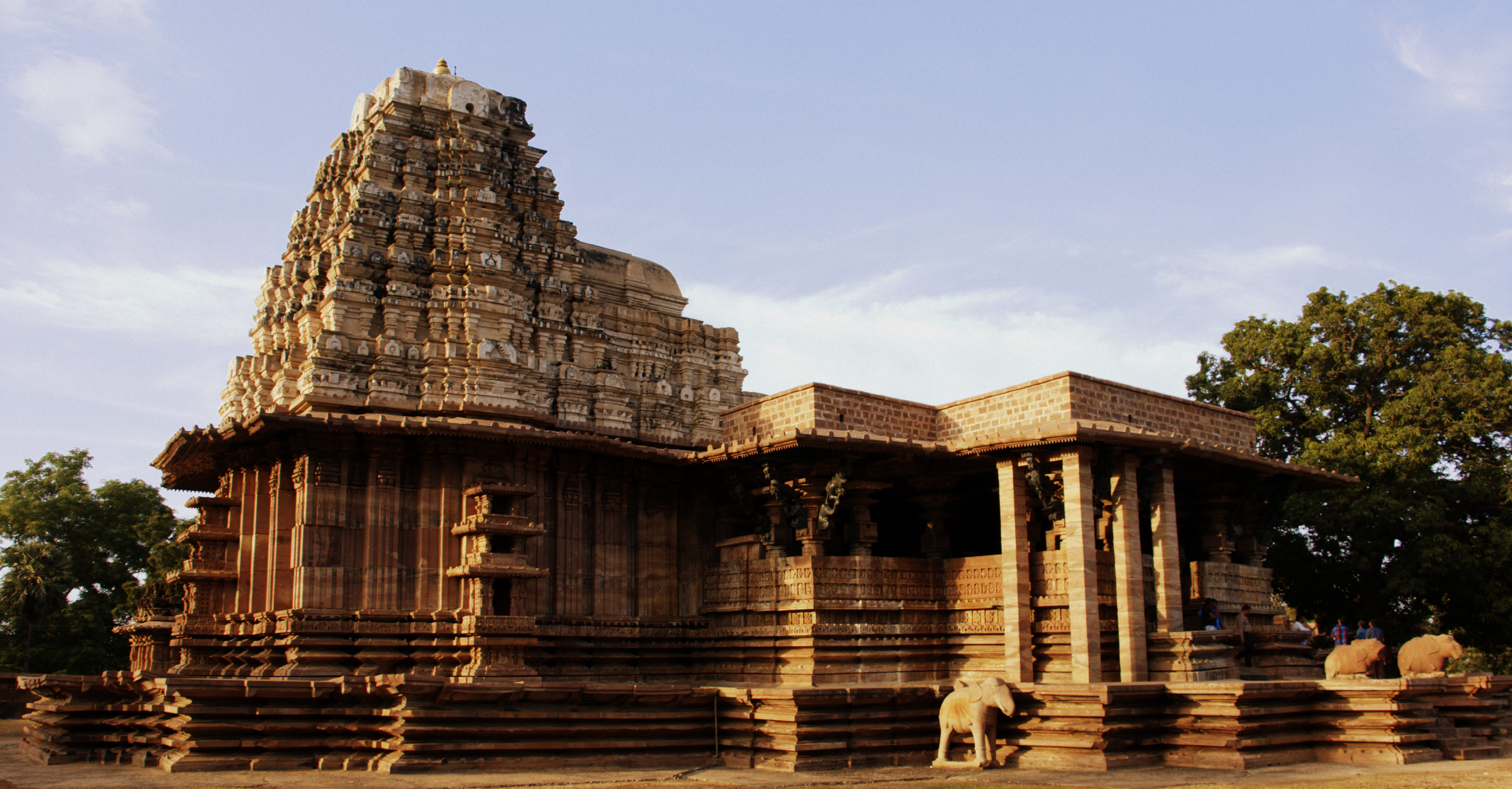
Ramappa temple (1213–1253 CE), a UNESCO World Heritage Site

Kakatiya era also saw the development of a distinct style of architecture which improved and innovated upon the existing modes. It is a fusion of Dravidian architecture and Nagara Bhumija styles in which sandbox technology is used to construct Vimana—horizontal stepped tower. Most notable examples are the Thousand Pillar Temple in Hanamkonda, Ramappa Temple in Palampet, and Kota Gullu in Ghanpur. Ramappa Temple, also known as the Rudreswara temple, is a UNESCO World Heritage Site located in Mulugu.

=== Cinema ===
Telugu cinema is the largest film industry in India in terms of box-office as well as admissions. The industry has produced some of India's most expensive and highest-grossing films of all time over the years.

=== Clothing ===
- Masculine
1. Uttareeyam (Uttariya) or Pai Pancha (Angvastram or veil)
2. Pancha (Dhoti)
3. Jubba (Kurta) The top portion
4. Lungi (Casual dress)
- Feminine
1. Langa voni (Half sari)
2. Cheera (sari)

=== Festivals ===
Important festivals celebrated by Telugu people include:

- Bhogi, Makara Sankranti, Kanuma in January. (The exact date may vary as per the Hindu calendar.)
- Maha Sivaratri in February/March. (The exact date may vary as per the Hindu calendar.)
- Ugadi or the Telugu New Year in March/April. (The exact date may vary as per the Hindu calendar.)
- Sri Rama Navami celebrated in March/April, 9 days after Ugadi. (The exact date may vary as per the Hindu calendar.)
- Bonalu celebrated in Ashada masam (July/August). (The exact date may vary as per the Hindu calendar.)
- Hanuman Jayanti in March/May/June. (The exact date may vary as per the Hindu calendar.)
- Vaikunta Ekadasi in December /January. (The exact date may vary as per Hindu calendar.)
- Varalakshmi Vratam in August. (The exact date may vary as per Hindu calendar.)
- Krishna Janmashtami in August. (The exact date may vary as per Hindu calendar.)
- Vinayaka Chaviti in August. (The exact date may vary as per the Hindu calendar.)
- Bathukamma celebrated for nine days during Durga Navaratri.
- Dasara in September/October. (The exact date may vary as per the Hindu calendar.)
- Atla Tadde 3rd day in bright half of Ashviyuja month (falls in September/October in Gregorian calendar). However, the exact date may vary according to the Hindu calendar.
- Deepavali (date may vary as per the Hindu calendar.)
- Nagula Chavithi is in October/November. (The exact date may vary as per the Hindu calendar.)
- Christmas, Easter, Ramzan, Eid al-Fitr, Eid al-Adha, Muharram, Vesak are among the minorities.

== Population ==
=== Castes and communities ===
The Telugu people are subdivided into several castes and communities. Some of them include: Yadav, Reddy, Vishwakarma/ Vishwabrahmana, Kapu/Balija, Kamma, Brahmin, Raju, Komati, Boya, Devanga, Padmasali, Bhatraju, velama, Goud, Mala, Madiga, Jangam, Kuruba, Relli and Vaddera

=== Distribution ===
Telugu is the third most common language in India, right behind Bengali. Telugu is predominantly spoken in the Indian states of Andhra Pradesh and Telangana, although it's also the official language of several other states like Andaman and Nicobar, Tamil Nadu, Karnataka, Orissa, Kharagpur of West Bengal, Bellary Of Karnataka, Where also Bellary City has the highest density of Telugu speakers in the state of Karnataka and also the city to have highest number of Telugu speakers outside Telugu States with nearly 30.03% of population being Telugu Speakers.
It is a part of the Dravidian language family, which has been around for about 2000 years. Outside Telugu states the largest number of Telugu speakers are found in Karnataka (3.7 million) and Tamil Nadu, making them the second largest language groups in those neighbouring states. In Karnataka, Telugu people are predominantly found in the border districts with majority in Bengaluru city and Bellary city. In Maharashtra, the Telugu population is over 1.4 million, followed by 0.7 million in Orissa. Other states with significant populations include West Bengal, Chhattisgarh and Gujarat with 200,000, 150,000 and 100,000 respectively.

Members of the overseas Telugu diaspora are spread across countries like United States, Australia, Canada, United Kingdom, New Zealand in the Anglosphere; Malaysia, Myanmar, Mauritius, Fiji, Bangladesh, South Africa; UAE, Saudi Arabia, Kuwait in the Arabian Gulf. Telugu speakers number more than 1,000,000 in the United States, with the highest concentration in Central New Jersey, Texas, and California. There are around 500,000 Telugu people in Malaysia, and 200,000 in Myanmar.

== See also ==
- Telugu states
- List of people from Andhra Pradesh
- List of people from Telangana
- Telugu development
- Telugu cuisine
- Telugu cinema
