= Nachana Somanatha =

Telugu Poet

- Other name: Nachana Soma
- Citizenship: Vijayanagara Empire
- Occupation: Poet
- Years active: 14th century
- Notable work: Uttara-Harivamsamu, Vasanta Vilasamu

Nachana Soma-natha (IAST: Nācana Somanātha) was a 14th-century Telugu language poet from the Vijayanagara Empire of southern India. He translated the Sanskrit work Harivamsa into Telugu as Uttara-Harivamsamu, and also wrote the now-lost Vasanta Vilasamu, an early prabandha work.

== Biography ==
According to a 1344 CE inscription (alternative readings suggest different dates), the Vijayanagara king Bukka Raya I granted Penchukaladinne village, also known as Bukka-raya-puram, to Nachana Soma-natha.

In the colophons of his works, Soma-natha describes himself as a "master of structure/storytelling" (samvidhana-chakravarti) and as an "innovative poet" (navina-guna-sanathudu). According to Velcheru Narayana Rao and David Shulman, these epithets are justified: Soma-natha contributed to the transition from a Puranic style to the more intense Kavya style seen in the works of the later poets such as Srinatha.

== Works ==
Yes, I’m a whore. And you have power.
You defeated Indra and ordered your men
to catch me. It’s a game for you.
I'm a wreck. What can you get
from this body? The parrot gone,
what use is the cage? Can you make love
without love?

— Urvashi to Narakasura, who wants to have sex with her, in Nachana Somanatha's Uttara-Harivamsamu

Uttara-Harivamsamu is Soma-natha's translation of the second part of the Sanskrit text Harivamsa, with some adaptations. The text features a Puranic theme, but also exhibits an early form of the prabandha genre. According to Kandukuri Veeresalingam, it is better than Errapragada's translation of the same text. Soma-natha characterized his work as an appendix to Tikkana's Mahabharatamu, and like Tikkana, dedicated his work to the god Harihara. Veeresalingam states that Soma-natha is better than earlier poets such as Nannayya and Tikkana in some respects, such as style and language.

The 18th century poet Kasturi Ranga-kavi quotes briefly from another work attributed to Nachana Soma-natha: Hari-vilasamu or Hara-vilasamu. Ranga-kavi uses both these titles: it is possible these were two different works.

Soma-natha's Vasanta Vilasamu is a lost work, known from a mention by the 18th century poet Kuchimanchi Timma-kavi. It featured a full-fledged prabandha style.
