= Suranna =

Suranna may refer to:

- Nutana-kavi Suranna, 15th-16th century Telugu language poet
- Pingali Suranna, 16th century Telugu language poet
