= Malaysian Telugus =

Malaysians of Telugu descent

మలేషియా తెలుగువారు
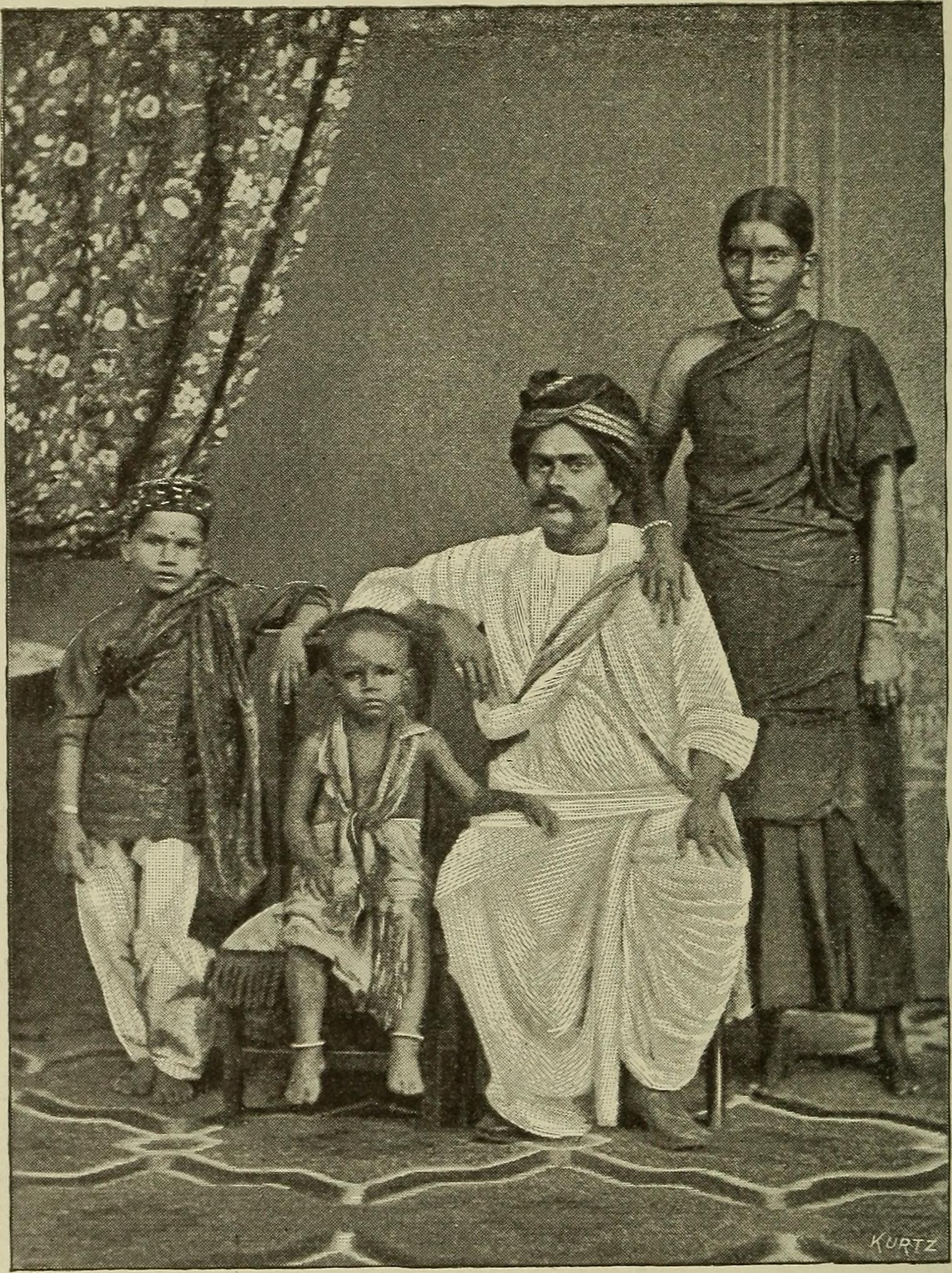
- A Telugu family in Malaysia, photographed c.1892

Total population
- 500,000

Regions with significant populations
- Malaysia (Peninsular Malaysia)

Languages
- Telugu, Tamil, Bahasa Malaysia and English

Religion
- Hinduism

Related ethnic groups
- Malaysian Indians, Telugu people

Malaysian Telugus (Telugu: మలేషియా తెలుగువారు, romanized: Malēṣiyā Teluguvāru; consist of people of full or partial Telugu descent who were born in or immigrated to Malaysia. Most Malaysian Telugus are descended from migrants from Madras Presidency during the colonial period. Historically, most Malaysian Telugus originated from the Uttarandhra region with some from the East Godavari and Chittoor regions of present-day Andhra Pradesh.

The current population of Malaysian Telugus are mostly third and fourth generation Telugus who descended from plantation workers under the Kangani system who arrived in the 19th and early 20th century. While most Telugus came to Malaysia as plantation workers, some were professionals and traders who arrived as refugees. For example, in the 1930s following anti-Indian riots, and during World War II when the Japanese invaded, some ethnic Telugus fled from Burma to Malaya. More recently the Telugu language and culture have been resurgent.

== History ==
Telugus along with other Indians from India's east coast and the Bay of Bengal arrived on the shores of ancient Suvarnabhumi (referring to Malay Peninsula and Lower Burma, meaning "Land of Gold" in Sanskrit) and other parts of Southeast Asia. Indians from the Godavari basin arrived in the ancient Malay peninsula, trading and settling down, thus influencing local customs and culture. Sejarah Melayu addressed India as Benua Keling and Indians as "Keling", a word taken from Kalinga, an ancient Indian kingdom which is likely the source of Indian influence across Southeast Asia. Kalinga is located in the northern part of Andhra Pradesh and the southern part of Orissa with people in this region now speaking either Telugu or Oriya.

The current population of Malaysian Telugus are mostly third and fourth generation Telugus who descended from indentured laborers under the Kangani system who arrived in the 19th and early 20th century. Some also paid their own passage after the Kangani system ended in the early 20th century. Most of the Telugu migrants to the Malay peninsula during the colonial era were from northern coastal regions of Andhra Pradesh, often recruited by maistries or kanganis (foremen) from the Visakhapatnam, Vizianagaram and Srikakulam regions, with some from the East Godavari and Chittoor regions. The migrants usually shared the same neighbourhood background, blood ties or caste connections.

Telugus who arrived during the British colonial era were mainly non-Brahmin Hindus from the Kamma, Reddy, Gavara, Kapu (Telaga), Velama, Chakali, and Mangali castes. Another recruitment centre was Nagapattinam in Tamil Nadu. While the Indian immigrants in the early period were predominantly men, the Telugus were more willing to bring women with them. Many Telugus arrived via Penang, settling in Bagan Datoh, Perak before scattering across the Malay peninsula, commonly found in the rubber and coconut plantations in Perak (such as Telok Anson), Johor, and Kedah. Bagan Datoh remains an important historical centre for Malaysian Telugus, with many Telugu cultural activities being conducted at Sri Venkateswara Temple. Other areas with notable Telugu populations include Lumut, Perak and Rawang, Selangor.

In the 1930s, anti-Indian riots in Burma resulted in large numbers of ethnic Telugus fleeing from Burma either back to India, or to Malaya. Another wave of Telugu migration from Burma occurred during World War II, and when the Japanese invaded Burma.

As the Telugus formed only a minority of Indians in British Malaya, with Tamils the most populous group, they weren't particularly visible as a group and thus their identity was subsumed into the larger group of South Indians. They, along with the Tamils and Malayalees, were referred to as Klings or Madrasis used as general terms for South Indians. In 1955, the Malaya Andhra Sanghamu, later Malaysia Andhra Sanghamu, was formed to support the Telugu community, foster their culture and promote their language.

== Population ==
Exact numbers of the Malaysian Telugu population are not known, however Telugus are thought to be the second largest group of Indians in Malaysia after Tamils. In British Malaya they formed around 4% of the Indian population, and in the 1980 census, 2.4%. The Telugu Association of Malaysia estimates the population to be approximately 500,000 as of 2024.

== Language ==
Malaysian Telugus speak the Telugu language, the world's most spoken Dravidian language which falls under the "South Central Dravidian" branch of the language family. In 1981, the Second World Telugu Conference was held in Kuala Lumpur. The Telugu Association of Malaysia (TAM; Telugu: మలేసియా తెలుగు సంఘము, romanized: Malēsiyā Telugu Saṅghamu; Malay: Persatuan Telugu Malaysia), a non profit NGO, serves to represent the interests of Malaysian Telugus as well as preserving and promoting Telugu language and culture. The Telugu Association of Malaysia was first formed in the Lower Perak District on 17 July 1955, under the banner of "Malaya Andhra Sangamu" and was officially registered on 17 February 1956. On 16 December 1963, it was renamed "Malaysia Andhra Sangamu". The name evolved into its current form in 1983 and is also known as "Malaysia Telugu Sangamu".

=== Status ===
Prior to the late 1980s, there were as many as 63 Telugu medium schools, but the last of these closed in 1990, with Telugu having ceased to be school exam subject in 1983. As a result, there was a sharp decline in literacy in the Telugu language, although nearly all Telugus in Malaysia still maintain their language in a family context. A small significant number also used English in their social interaction with other Telugus, and they may also use Malay and Tamil in other situations outside the community. Telugus may speak Telugu, English, Malay and Tamil with varying degree of proficiency, and people of different age groups may have different language preferences when communicating with public officers. Most Telugus can code-switch mixing Telugu with English in their communication, followed by Malay and Tamil.

There has been a resurgence in Telugu language education following political and financial support from the Malaysian government beginning in 2010. In 2022 the Malaysian Indian Congress launched a Telugu branch to support the community's interests. Today there are more than 5000 new students who have been educated in the Telugu language at the Telugu Academy which was set up by the Telugu Association of Malaysia.
