= Vyākaranam =

Vyākaranam or Vyākarana can refer to:

- Vyākaraṇa, the study of Sanskrit grammar
- Telugu grammar, grammar of the Telugu language
- Hindi grammar, grammar of the Hindi language
