= Nannayya =

11th-century Telugu-language poet

Nannayya Bhattaraka
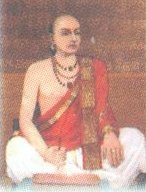
- Nannaya as depicted on a 2017 postage stamp of India
- Born: Rajamahendravaram. (present-day Rajamundry, Andhra Pradesh, India)
- Died: 11th century
- Occupations: Poet, writer
- Writing career
- Period: 11th century
- Genre: Poet
- Notable work: Andhra Mahabharatam
- Movement: Bhakti movement

Nannayya Bhattaraka or Nannayya Bhattu (sometimes spelled Nannaya; c. 11th century) was a Telugu poet and the author of Andhra Mahabharatam, a Telugu retelling of the Sanskrit-language Mahabharata. Nannaya is generally considered the first poet (Adi Kavi) of Telugu language. He was patronised by Rajaraja Narendra of Rajamahendravaram. Rajaraja Narendra was an admirer of Mahabharata and wanted the message of the Sanskrit epic to reach the Telugu masses in their own language and idiom. He commissioned Nannaya, a scholar well versed in Vedas, Puranas, and Itihasas for the task. Nannaya began his work in c. 1025 CE and wrote Adi Parvam, Sabaparvam, and a part of Aranyaparvam.

Nannaya is the first of the three Telugu poets, called the Kavitrayam ("trinity of poets"), who wrote Andhra Mahabharatam. His work, which is rendered in the Champu style, is chaste and polished and of a high literary merit. The advanced and well-developed language used by Nannaya suggests that prior Telugu literature other than royal grants and decrees must have existed before him. However, these presumed works are now lost. Legends also credit him with writing the Sanskrit-language Andhra-shabda-chintamani, said to be the first work on Telugu grammar.

== Early life ==
Nannaya was born in a Telugu Brahmin family. He resided in Rajamahendravaram under the patronage of Eastern Chalukya king Rajaraja Narendra.

== Andhra Mahabharatam ==
Rajaraja Narendra was an admirer of Mahabharata and wanted the message of the Sanskrit epic to reach the Telugu masses in their own language and idiom. He commissioned Nannaya, a scholar well versed in Vedas, Puranas, and Itihasas for the task. Nannaya wrote Adi Parvam, Sabaparva, and a part of Aranyaparvam. Later in the 13th century Tikkana left the remainder of Aranyaparvam and wrote 15 parvams from Virata Parvam to Svargarohana Parvam. After that in the 14th century Errana Aranyaparva filled the remainder.

== Grammar ==
Some legends credit Nannaya with writing Andhra-shabda-chintamani ("Magic Jewel of Telugu Words"), a Sanskrit-language work that was the first treatise on Telugu grammar. This lost work is said to have contained five chapters with 82 verses in the Arya metre. Nannaya is said to have written this text with help of his friend Narayana Bhatta. Nannaya's grammar is said to have been divided into five chapters, covering samjnā, sandhi, ajanta, halanta and kriya.

Yelakuchi Bala-sarasvati wrote a Telugu gloss (commentary) on this work, and his Bala-sarasvatiyamu refers to this legend in brief. A more elaborate version of the legend appears in Appa-kavi's Appakavīyamu (1656). According to this version, Bhimana, who was jealous of Nannaya, stole and destroyed Andhra-shabda-chintamani by throwing it in the Godavari River. Unknown to others, King Rajaraja-narendra's son Saranga-dhara, an immortal siddha, had memorised Nannaya's grammar. He gave a written copy of Nannaya's work to Bala-sarasvati near Matanga Hill (at Vijayanagara), and Bala-sarasvati wrote a Telugu gloss (commentary) on the work. With help of the god Vishnu, Appa-kavi received a copy of Nannaya's work, and wrote Appakavīyamu as a commentary on this text. Ahobala-panditiya (also known as Kavi-siro-bhushana), a Sanskrit commentary on Andhra-shabda-chintamani, also retells this story.

While some of the grammatical sutras in Appa-kavi's work may be from Nannaya's time, Andhra-shabda-chintamani is an imaginary work, and was probably fabricated by Bala-sarasvati himself. Although Appa-kavi describes his work as a commentary, it is really an original work.

== See also ==
- Telugu Literature
- Kavitrayam
- Adikavi Nannaya University
