= Nutana-kavi Suranna =

Suranna
- Citizenship: Vijayanagara Empire (in present-day southern India)
- Occupation: Poet
- Relatives: Tikkana
- Writing career
- Pen name: Nutana-kavi ("New Poet")
- Language: Telugu
- Period: 15th or 16th century
- Notable work: Dhanabhi-ramamu

Sūranna (or Surana), who styled himself as Nūtana-kavi ("New Poet") was a Telugu language poet from the Vijayanagara Empire of present-day southern India. He probably lived during the 15th or the 16th century, and is notable for Dhanabhi-ramamu, the story of a contest between Manmatha (the god of love) and Kubera (the god of wealth).

== Biography ==
Little is known about Suranna's life. He lived in the Vijayanagara Empire, and claimed to have been born in the family of the famous poet Tikkana. He highly praises the deity Bhimeshvara of Draksharamam (in present-day Andhra Pradesh).

Suranna mentions the 14th-century poet Nachana Somanatha in his book. A verse by Suranna is included in Pedapati Jagganna's anthology Prabandha-ratna-karamu (c. 1600 CE). This suggests that Suranna probably lived during the 15th-16th century. Estimates of his period include 1420–1475, 1425–1480, and c. 1550.

== Works ==
An ugly man becomes handsome,
a bad man becomes good,
a fickle one turns stable,
a coward is made into a warrior,
low-caste becomes high-caste,
an idiot achieves wisdom,
the crude turns elegant,
an illiterate lout becomes expert
in all branches of learning—
if only he has money.

— Kubera, the god of wealth, in Nutana-kavi Suranna's Dhanabhi-ramamu

Suranna composed Dhanabhi-ramamu (or Dhanabhi-ramam) and a drama titled Vishnu-Maya-Vilasa. In Dhanabhi-ramamu, Manmatha (the god of love) and Kubera (the god of wealth) debate whether humans care more about beauty or wealth. In the end, the god Shiva resolves the dispute by stating that both looks and money are equally important. Besides its literary merits, the work is of historical interest as it provides information about the ornaments and dress of the contemporary period.
