= Telugu grammar =

Grammar of the Telugu language

Telugu is an agglutinative language with person, tense, case and number being inflected on the end of nouns and verbs. Its word order is usually subject-object-verb, with the direct object following the indirect object. The grammatical function of the words are marked by suffixes that indicate case and postpositions that follow the oblique stem. It is also head-final and a pro-drop language.

The first treatise on Telugu grammar (Telugu: వ్యాకరణము, romanized: vyākaraṇamu), the Andhra Shabda Chintamani (Telugu: ఆంధ్ర శబ్ద చింతామణి, romanized: Āndhra śabda cintāmaṇi) was written in Sanskrit by Nannayya, who is considered the first poet (ādikavi) and grammarian of the Telugu language, in the 11th century CE. In the 13th century, Andhra Bhasha Bhushanamu, a foundational Telugu grammar and vocabulary work, was written by the 13th-century scholar Mulaghatika Ketana, and is considered the first comprehensive Telugu grammar written in Telugu. In the 19th century, Paravastu Chinnaya Suri wrote a simplified work on Telugu grammar called Bāla Vyākaraṇam (lit. Children's grammar), borrowing concepts and ideas from Nannayya, in Telugu.

According to Nannayya, language without 'Niyama' or language which does not adhere to Vyākaranam is called Grāmya (lit of the village) or Apabhraṃśa, and is unfit for literary usage. All literary texts in Telugu follow the Vyākaraṇam. Following the pure Telugu movement to minimise loan words and maximize usage of native Telugu, that is naatu Telugu, a melimi Telugu version was introduced where the term melimi means "fine" or "excellence". The grammar for this version is telugu nudikattu.

== Nouns ==
Telugu is more inflected than other literary Dravidian languages. Telugu nouns are inflected for number (singular, plural), gender (masculine, feminine, neuter) and grammatical case (nominative, accusative, instrumental, dative, ablative, genitive, locative and vocative).

There is a rich system of derivational morphology in Telugu. Verbs and adjectives can be converted into nouns by adding a variety of suffixes.

Example:

- verb

ceyu + ika = ceyika(action)

- adjective

manchi + thanam = manchithanam (goodness)

=== Gender ===
Telugu has three genders, which govern verb agreement:

- masculine ( puliṅgamu),
- feminine (strī liṅgamu),
- neuter (napunsaka liṅgamu).

In Telugu the occurrence of the suffix (–ḍu) almost always encodes masculine gender. For example:

- tammuḍu (younger brother),
- mukhyuḍu (important man),
- Rāmuḍu (Rāma),
- nāyakuḍu (leader).

However, there are nouns that do not end in (-ḍu) that belong to the masculine class. For example:

- annayya (elder brother),
- māmayya (uncle).

Most of the words ending in -ḍu are borrowings from Sanskrit words ending in -a, and therefore the feminine forms of these words are equivalent to the Sanskrit words.

| Masculine | Sanskrit original | Feminine |
|---|---|---|
| nartakuḍu | nartaka | nartaki |
| vācakuḍu | vācaka | vācaki |
| premikuḍu | premika | preyasi |

Sometimes, a word ending in -ḍu is feminized by adding the suffix -ālu to the root. The -a ending of the root becomes -ur. This phenomenon is known as the rugāgama sandhi.

| Masculine | Sanskrit original | Feminine |
|---|---|---|
| nartakuḍu | nartaka | nartakurālu |
| priyuḍu | priya | priyurālu |
| bhaktuḍu | bhakta | bhakturālu |

Neuter-gendered words usually contain the suffix -amu. This suffix descends from the Old Telugu suffix -ambu and is increasingly losing the final -u to become -aṁ. These neuter words are often borrowed from Sanskrit words ending in -a or -u. The final -a usually becomes -amu, and the final -u becomes -uvu.

| Sanskrit original | Telugu |
|---|---|
| ākāśa | ākāśamu |
| madhu | madhuvu |

However, Telugu sometimes uses the same forms for singular feminine and neuter genders– the third person pronoun (అది /ad̪i/) can be used to refer to animals and objects.

=== Number ===
Anything with quantity one is singular (ekavachanam). Anything more than one in number is called plural (bahuvachanam), as in English. Formation of the plural stem, however, is relatively complicated, although the ending is centred on variants -lu or -ḷu.

In Telugu the plural is also used to as an honorific. Some nouns are always plural and some are always singular. For example, water (nīru) and milk (pālu) are always plural.

God (bhagavantudu), sun (suryudu), earth (bhūmi), and moon (chandrudu) are always singular form.

==== Plural formation ====
Rules
| Rule | Telugu | | English | Notes | Exceptions |
| Rule | Singular | Plural | English | Notes | Exceptions |
|---|---|---|---|---|---|
| 0 | āvu | āvulu | cow | No modification of the stem, and variant -lu is used. | cellelu → celleṇḍḷu, celleḷḷu "younger sister"; cēnu → cēlu "field with a crop"; kūturu → kūtuṇḍḷu, kūtuḷḷu "daughter"; eddu → eddulu, eḍḷu "bullock"; pēnu → pēlu "louse" |
| 1 | cōṭu | cōṭḷu | place | Vowels in -ṭ[i/u], -ṇṭ[i/u], or -ṇḍ[i/u] in the singular is deleted, and variant -ḷu is used. Forms in -ṇḍḷu varies with -ḷḷu, used in western and eastern dialects, respectively. | |
| 1 | paṇḍu | paṇḍḷu paḷḷu | fruit | Vowels in -ṭ[i/u], -ṇṭ[i/u], or -ṇḍ[i/u] in the singular is deleted, and variant -ḷu is used. Forms in -ṇḍḷu varies with -ḷḷu, used in western and eastern dialects, respectively. | |
| 2 | kālu | kāḷḷu | leg | -ḍ[i/u], -l[i/u], or -r[i/u] (-li or -ri are limited to nouns with at least 3 syllables) in the singular are replaced by -ḷḷu. Some instances of -ḷḷu have alternative form -rlu. | alluḍu → alluṇḍḷu, alluḷḷu "son-in-law"; ēḍu → ēṇḍḷu, ēḷḷu "year"; jītagāḍu → jītagāṇḍḷu, jītagāḷḷu "servant"; kāḍi → kāṇḍḷu, kāḷḷu "yoke"; kumāruḍu → kumārulu, kumāruḷḷu "son"; manamarālu → manamarāṇḍḷu, manamarāḷḷu "granddaughter" |
| 2 | pēru | pēḷḷu pērlu | name | -ḍ[i/u], -l[i/u], or -r[i/u] (-li or -ri are limited to nouns with at least 3 syllables) in the singular are replaced by -ḷḷu. Some instances of -ḷḷu have alternative form -rlu. | koḍavali → koḍavanḍḷu, koḍavaḷḷu "sickle"; -gāri → -gārlu "a honorific suffix"; -sāri → -sārlu "time" |
| 3 | guḍḍu | guḍḷu | egg | -ṭṭ[i/u] and -ḍḍ[i/u] in the singular change into -ṭ- and -ḍ- before variant -ḷu. | |
| 4 | illu | iṇḍḷu iḷḷu | house | -llu and -nnu in the singular are replaced by -ṇḍḷu or -ḷḷu. | junnu → junnulu "kind of cheese"; pannu → pannulu "tax"; ponnu → ponnulu "iron ring"; tannu → tannulu "beating"; ṭannu → ṭannulu "tonne"; vennu → vennulu "back, ear of corn" |
| 5 | pustakam | pustakālu | book | -[a/ā]m and -em in the singular are replaced by -ā- and -ē- before variant -lu. | |
| 6 | abbāy(i) | abbāy(i)lu | son, boy | The vowel in -yi- is sometimes deleted, and variant -lu is used. | |
| 7 | cēyi ceyyi | cētulu | hand | -(y)yi in the singular is replaced by -tulu, and the vowel preceding -yyi becomes long after pluralization (ceyyi → cētulu). | poyyi → poyyilu, poyilu "hearth"; rāyi → rāḷḷu "rock"; veyyi → vēlu "thousand" |
| 8 | pilli | pillulu | cat | The vowel -i- is replaced by -u-, and the variant -lu is used. In native nouns with more than three syllables, all instances of -i- is ablauted to -u-. | peṇḍḷi, peḷḷi → peṇḍḷinḍḷu, peḷḷiḷḷu "marriage"; rātri → rātriḷḷu "night"; vari → vaḍlu "paddy" |
| 8 | maniṣi | manuṣulu | person | The vowel -i- is replaced by -u-, and the variant -lu is used. In native nouns with more than three syllables, all instances of -i- is ablauted to -u-. | peṇḍḷi, peḷḷi → peṇḍḷinḍḷu, peḷḷiḷḷu "marriage"; rātri → rātriḷḷu "night"; vari → vaḍlu "paddy" |

=== Numerals ===
Cardinal numbers and quantifiers in Telugu vary based on whether or not the noun being counted is human, or non-human. The numbers from 1-7 have unique forms between the human and non-human forms, whereas numbers greater than 7 simply use the measure word మంది mandi to denote number. Ordinal numbers merely replace the final vowel of the non-human cardinal form with -ō and do not vary between human and non-human nouns.

| | 1 | | | | 2 | 3 | 4 | 5 | 6 | 7 | 8 | 9 | 10 |
|---|---|---|---|---|---|---|---|---|---|---|---|---|---|
| Non-Human | ఒక oka (prepositive) | ఒకటి okaṭi | | | రెండు reṇḍu | మూడు mūḍu | నాలుగు nālugu | ఐదు aidu | ఆరు āru | ఏడు ēḍu | ఎనిమిది enimidi | తొమ్మిది tommidi | పది padi |
| Human | ఒక oka (prepositive) | ఒకడు okaḍu (male informal) | ఒకతే okatē (female informal) | ఒకరు okaru (respectful) | ఇద్దరు iddaru | ముగ్గురు mugguru | నలుగురు naluguru | ఐదుగురు aiduguru | ఆరుగురు āruguru | ఏడుగురు ēḍuguru | ఎనిమిది మంది enimidi mandi | తొమ్మిది మంది tommidi mandi | పది మంది padi mandi |
| Ordinal | మొదటి, ఒకటో modaṭi, okaṭō | | | | రెండో reṇḍō | మూడో mūḍō | నాలుగో nālugō | ఐదో aidō | ఆరో ārō | ఏడో ēḍō | ఎనిమిదో enimidō | తొమ్మిదో tommidō | పదో padō |

=== Case ===
A Grammar of Modern Telugu by Krishnamurti and Gwynn (1985), which focuses on a grammatical description of modern spoken Telugu rather than classical literary Telugu, presents a simple analysis of grammatical case, in comparison with classical Telugu:

Only the nominative, genitive, accusative, and dative cases are regularly used, and the locative case is formed using the suffixes -lō, -lōpala which were originally placed in the Genitive case by traditional grammarians to fit into the Sanskrit case scheme. The instrumental+sociative case suffix is -tō (while classical has -cēn/-cētan for instrumental and -tōn/-tōḍan for sociative); the colloquial suffixes for ablative case are -nuṇḍi/-nuñci. Ablative case is also used for comparative statements in colloquial Telugu, for which the suffixes are -kaṇṭe/-kannā. Another usage of ablative case is to indicate 'because of' noun, where the suffix -valla (classical -valanan) is used. The benefactive suffixes in classical (-koṟakun/-kai) are completely replaced by -kōsam in modern colloquial Telugu. The genitive form of a noun is defaulted to its oblique stem, i.e., oblique stem of a noun serves as its genitive case by default, though an explicit suffix -yokka is used in formal contexts (refer to oblique stem formation below).

The accusative case suffix is -ni/-nu, with the former always used after final syllables containing -i-, and the latter elsewhere but freely varies with -ni. The intervening vowel is sometimes deleted between -ḍ-, -l-, -n-, -ṇ-, -r- and the suffix, e.g. mimmala "you (plural) + -ni → mimmalni, vāḍi "him" + -ni → vāṇṇi (*-ḍni → -ṇṇi).

In neuter nouns, the nominative singular ending -am changes before the accusative and dative case suffixes, such that the combined forms of these endings are neuter accusative singular -ānni (← *-ānini) and neuter dative singular -āniki.

| Case | Suffix | Example |
|---|---|---|
| Dative | -ki/-ku | అతను బడికి వెళ్తాడు Atanu baḍiki veḷtāḍu He goes to school |
| Accusative | -ni/-nu | అతను అబ్బాయిని చూస్తాడు Atanu abbāyini cūstāḍu He sees the boy |
| Sociative + Instrumental | -tō | అతను కుక్కతో ఆడుకుంటాడు Atanu kukkatō āḍukuṇṭāḍu He plays with the dog అతను చేతితో రాస్తున్నాడు Atanu cētitō rāstunnāḍu He is writing using hand |
| Ablative | -nuṇḍi/-nuñci ('from') -kaṇṭē/-kannā (comparative) -valla ('because of') | అతను ఇంటినుండి బయలుదేరాడు Atanu iṇṭinuṇḍi bayaludērǣḍu He set out from home అతనికంటే నేను పొడుగు Atanikaṇṭē nēnu poḍugu I am taller than him అతనివల్ల నేను ఓడిపొయ్యాను Atanivalla ōḍipoyyǣnu I have lost because of him |
| Locative | -lō/lōpala | అతను గదిలో ఉన్నాడు Atanu gadilō unnāḍu He is in the room |

==== Oblique stem formation ====
Formation of the oblique stem, also usually but not always the same as the genitive (by default homophonous unless noted), is relatively complicated just like pluralization. The plural oblique stem, however, is either -la or -ḷa.

Classes
| Class | Telugu | | English | Notes |
| Class | Nominative | Oblique | English | Notes |
|---|---|---|---|---|
| A | ceṭṭu | ceṭṭu- | tree | No change. |
| B | kālu | kāli- | leg | Human nouns ending in -ḍu, -lu, -nu, or -ru (including a few non-human nouns ending in -lu or -ru) replace -u with -i. |
| C | gūḍu | gūṭi- | nest | Non-human nouns ending in -ḍ[i/u], -l[i/u], -r[i/u] replace the endings with -ṭi. |
| D | illu | iṇṭi- | house | Only limited to nouns cannu "breast", illu "house", kannu "eye", oḷḷu "body", pannu "teeth", and villu "bow". |
| D | kannu | kaṇṭi- | eye | Only limited to nouns cannu "breast", illu "house", kannu "eye", oḷḷu "body", pannu "teeth", and villu "bow". |
| E | cēyi ceyyi | cēti- | hand | Only limited to nouns cēyi "hand", gōyi "pit", nēyi "ghee", nūyi "well", rāyi "stone", gorru "hearth", and Parru, all of them except the last three show variation between -V̄yi vs. -Vyyi. |
| E | gorru | gorti | hearth | Only limited to nouns cēyi "hand", gōyi "pit", nēyi "ghee", nūyi "well", rāyi "stone", gorru "hearth", and Parru, all of them except the last three show variation between -V̄yi vs. -Vyyi. |
| F | kalam | kalāni- | pen | All nouns ending in -am replace the ending with -āni, although the genitive is homophonous with nominative instead of the oblique stem. |

=== Examples ===
Only nominative, genitive, accusative, and dative cases are shown here.

kukka "dog"
| | Singular | Plural |
|---|---|---|
| Nominative | kukka | kukkalu |
| Genitive | kukka | kukkala |
| Accusative | kukkani | kukkalani |
| Dative | kukkaki | kukkalaki |

== Sentence Structure ==
Telugu word order tends to be subject–object–verb. It is head-final - the head follows its complements. Since Telugu is a pro-drop language, the subject can be omitted as the verb already marks person and number.

రాముడు బడికి వెళ్తాడు.
Rāmuḍu baḍiki veḷtāḍu
Ram {to school} goes.
Subject Object Verb
Ram goes to school.

అతను కుక్కను చూస్తాడు
Atanu kukkanu cūstāḍu
He {the dog} sees
Subject Object Verb
He sees the dog

== Sandhi or joining ==
Sandhi is the fusion of sounds across word boundaries and the alteration of sounds due to neighboring sounds or due to the grammatical function of adjacent words.

Telugu sandhis can be divided into native ones and those derived from Sanskrit ones.

=== Sanskrit Sandhis ===
These sandhis usually take place when the two words undergoing Sandhi are words borrowed from Sanskrit.

==== Savarṇadīrghasandhi (Vowel lengthening) ====
The savarṇadīrgha sandhi, from Sanskrit savarṇa 'same sound' and dīrgha 'long', this sandhi takes place when the first word ends in the same vowel that the second word starts with. The two vowels join to form one long vowel.

Examples of the savarṇadīrgha sandhi
| Initial word | Final word | Result |
|---|---|---|
| deva | ālayamu | dēvālayamu |
| pārvati | īśvaruḍu | pārvatīśvaruḍu |
| aṇu | utpatti | aṇūtpatti |

==== Guṇasandhi (Vowel raising) ====
The guṇasandhi takes place when a word final -a is followed by either -i, -u or -r̥. The sandhi yields -ē, -ō and -ar respectively. -ē, -ō and -ar are collectively called the guṇas, hence the name.

Examples of the guṇasandhi
| Initial word | Final word | Result |
|---|---|---|
| mahā | indra | mahēndra |
| dhana | utpatti | dhanōtpatti |
| dēva | r̥ṣi | dēvarṣi |

==== Vr̥ddhisandhi (Diphthongization) ====
The vr̥ddhisandhi, from Sanskrit vr̥ddhi-, 'growth', takes place when a word final -a is followed by -ē or -ai, -ō or -au, and -ar or -ār, and yields -ai, -au and -ār respectively. -ai, -au and -ār are collectively called the vr̥ddhis, hence the name.

Examples of the vr̥ddhisandhi
| Initial word | Final word | Result |
|---|---|---|
| vasudha | ēka | vasudhaika |
| mahā | aikyata | mahaikyata |
| vīra | ōjassu | vīraujassu |
| divya | auṣadhamu | divyauṣadhamu |

==== Yaṇādēśasandhi (Glide insertion) ====
The yaṇādēśasandhi takes place when word final -i, -u or -r̥ is followed by a non-similar vowel. The sandhi yields either -y-, -v- or -r- respectively. These are known as the yaṇās.

Examples of the yaṇādēśasandhi
| Initial word | Final word | Result |
|---|---|---|
| ati | āśa | atyāśa |
| su | āgatamu | svāgatamu |
| pitr̥ | ājña | pitrājña |

=== Native sandhis ===
These sandhis usually occur when one or both of the words is a native Telugu word, or is a Sanskrit borrowing that is treated as such (ex. iṣṭamu).

==== Akārasandhi (Elision of a) ====
This sandhi occurs when a word final -a is followed by any vowel. The word final -a is removed, and the following vowel takes its place.

Examples of akārasandhi
| Initial word | Final word | Result |
|---|---|---|
| iṅkā | ēṇṭi | iṅkēṇṭi |
| puṭṭina | illu | puṭṭinillu |
| amma | aṇṭē | ammaṇṭē |
| teliyaka | uṇḍenu | teliyakuṇḍenu |

==== Ikārasandhi ====
This sandhi occurs when a word final -i is followed by any vowel. The word final -i is removed, and the following vowel takes its place.

Examples of ikārasandhi
| Initial word | Final word | Result |
|---|---|---|
| mari | eppuḍu | mareppuḍu |
| vāḍi | illu | vāḍillu |
| ēmi | aṇṭivi | ēmaṇṭivi |
| ēmi | a(y)inadi | ēma(y)inadi |
| ēmi | undi | ēmundi |

==== Ukārasandhi ====
This sandhi occurs when a word final -u is followed by any vowel. The word final -u is removed, and the following vowel takes its place.

Example of ukārasandhi
| Initial word | Final word | Result |
|---|---|---|
| ceppu | iṅkā | ceppiṅkā |
| vāḍu | evaḍu | vāḍevaḍu |
| nīḷlu | unnāyā | nīḷlunnāyā |
| vāḍu | annāḍu | vāḍannāḍu |

==== Trikasandhi ====
One of the most complicated of the sandhis, the trikasandhi is of two forms:

1. When a final -ā -ī or -ē is followed by a non-clustered consonant, the vowel is shortened, and the unclustered consonant is geminated.
2. When the word mūḍu (three) is followed by a consonant, the word-final -ḍu is eliminated. This triggers the first rule of the trikasandhi, and the now-word-final -ū is shortened, and the following consonant is geminated. When the consonant is l-, sometimes it is geminated to -ḷḷ- instead.

Examples of the trikasandhi
| Initial word | Final word | Result |
|---|---|---|
| ī | kālamu | ikkālamu |
| ē | cōṭu | eccōṭu |
| ā | bhaṅgi | abbaṅgi |
| mūḍu | lōkamulu | mullōkamulu |
| mūḍu | kōṭi | mukkōṭi |

==== Āmrēḍitasandhi ====
This sandhi deals with repeated words, i.e., pairs of same words. This sandhi forms some of the most used irregular-looking words in the language. It has three rules:

1. When a vowel-initial word is repeated, the final vowel of the first word is eliminated.
2. Word final forms of ka (ka, ki, ku, ke, etc.) of the first word are eliminated and the first rule is applied.
3. The andādi words (anduku, iggulu, tumuru, tuniyalu, etc.) when compounded lead to irregular forms.

Examples of the āmrēḍitasandhi
| Word | Result |
|---|---|
| aura | auraura |
| endun | endendun |
| appaṭiki | appaṭappaṭiki |
| ūran | ūrūran |
| ceduru | cellāceduru |
| iggulu | iṟṟiggulu |

==== Dviruktaṭakārasandhi ====
Sometimes regarded as a form of the āmrēḍitasandhi, the dviruktaṭakārasandhi occurs when kaḍādi (kaḍa, naḍuma, madhyāhnamu, bayalu, etc.) words are compounded. A dviruktaṭakāra, a geminated -ṭṭ- forms from this sandhi, hence the name.

Examples of the dviruktaṭakārasandhi
| Initial word | Final word | Result |
|---|---|---|
| madhyāhnamu | madhyāhnamu | miṭṭamadhyāhnamu |
| pagalu | pagalu | paṭṭapagalu |
| naḍuma | iṇṭlō | naṭṭiṇṭlō |

==== Gasaḍadavādēśasandhi ====
- Trika Sandhi.
- Dugagama Sandhi.
- Saraladesha Sandhi
- Gasadadavadesha Sandhi.
- Rugagama Sandhi.
- Yadagama Sandhi.
- Prathametara Vibhakti Sandhi.
- Uchadadi sandhi.

== Samasam or nominal compounds ==
Samasam or samasa occurs with various structures, but morphologically speaking they are essentially the same: each noun (or adjective) is in its (weak) stem form, with only the final element receiving case inflection.

Some of the Telugu samasams are:

- Tatpuruṣa Samasam.
  - Prathama tatpurusha samasam
  - Dvitiya tatpurusha samasam
  - Trutiya tatpurusha samasam
  - Chaturthi tatpurusha samasam
  - Panchami tatpurusha samasam
  - Shashti tatpurusha samasam
  - Saptami tatpurusha samasam
  - Nai tatpurusha samasam
- Karmadhāraya Samasam.
  - Viśeshana purwapada karmadharaya samasam
  - Viśeshana uttarapada karmadharaya samasam
  - Viśeshana ubhayapada karmadharaya samasam
  - Upamana purvapada karmadharaya samasam
  - Upamana uttarapada karmadharaya samasam
  - Avadharana purvapada karmadharaya samasam
  - Sambhavana purvapada karmadharaya samasam
- Dvigu Samasam.
- Dvandva Samasam.
- Bahuvrīhi Samasam.
- Amredita Samasam.
- Avyayībhāva Samasam

== Alankaram or ornamentation ==
Telugu Alankaram is a figure of speech which means ornaments or embellishments which are used to enhance the beauty of the poems. There are two types of Alankarams, 'Shabdalankaram' which primarily focuses on Sound and 'Arthalamkaram' which focuses on meaning. These two alankarams are further broken down in to different categories. shabdalankaras are 6 types where as there are nearly 30 to 40 types in ardhalankaras.

- Shabdalankaram
  - Vruttyanuprasa
  - Chekanuprasa
  - Latanuprasa
  - antyanuprasa
  - Yamakam
  - Mukta pada grastam
- Arthalamkaram
  - Upamanaalankaram
  - Utprekshaalankaram
  - Rupakaalankaram
  - Shleshalankaram
  - Arthantaranyaasam
  - Atishayokti
  - Drushtantam
  - Swabhavokti
  - vyajastu
  - virodhi
  - vishamamu
  - parikaramu
  - branti madala
  - kramalam

== Chandassu or Telugu prosody ==
Metrical poetry in Telugu is called 'Chandassu' or 'Chandas'. ya-maa-taa-raa-ja-bhaa-na-sa-la-gam is called the chandassu chakram. Utpalamala, Champakamala, Mattebha vikreeditham, Sardoola Vikreeditham, Kanda, Aata veladi, Theta geethi, Sragdhara, Bhujangaprayata, etc. are some metrics used in Telugu poetry.

== Verbs ==
Although the morphological (grammatical) structure of Telugu verbs is quite evidently complex and complicated, the basic conjugation of subject person and number endings in modern spoken Telugu is in fact rather straightforward:

=== Past tense ===
| | Past tense | Past tense negative |
|---|---|---|
| 1st person singular నేను nēnu | వెళ్ళాను veḷḷānu I went | వెళ్ళలేదు veḷḷalēdu I didn't go |
| 2nd person singular నువ్వు nuvvu | వెళ్ళావు veḷḷāvu You went | వెళ్ళలేదు veḷḷalēdu You didn't go |
| 3rd person singular masculine అతను atanu | వెళ్ళాడు veḷḷāḍu He went | వెళ్ళలేదు veḷḷalēdu He didn't go |
| 3rd person singular feminine/neuter ఆమె āme | వెళ్ళింది veḷḷindi She went | వెళ్ళలేదు veḷḷalēdu She didn't go |
| 1st person plural మేము mēmu | వెళ్ళాము veḷḷāmu We went | వెళ్ళలేదు veḷḷalēdu We didn't go |
| 2nd person plural మీరు mīru | వెళ్ళారు veḷḷāru You (plural) went | వెళ్ళలేదు veḷḷalēdu You (plural) didn't go |
| 3rd person plural masculine/feminine వారు vāru | వెళ్ళారు veḷḷāru They (masc./fem.) went | వెళ్ళలేదు veḷḷalēdu They (masc./fem.) didn't go |
| 3rd person plural neuter అవి avi | వెళ్లాయి veḷlāyi They (neuter) went | వెళ్ళలేదు veḷḷalēdu They (neuter) didn't go |

The vowel -ā- is pronounced as /æː/ in the past tense ending, except in some verbs. In the verbs an- "to say", kan- "to buy", kon- "to bring forth", kūrcun- "to be seated", nilcun- "to stand", tin- " to eat", un- "to be", and vin- " to hear", -nā (with /aː/) is used instead.

=== Present tense ===
| | Present tense | Present tense negative |
|---|---|---|
| 1st person singular నేను nēnu | వెళ్తున్నాను veḷtunnānu I am going | వెళ్లట్లేదు veḷlaṭlēdu I am not going |
| 2nd person singular నువ్వు nuvvu | వెళ్తున్నావు veḷtunnāvu You are going | వెళ్లట్లేదు veḷlaṭlēdu You aren't going |
| 3rd person singular masculine అతను atanu | వెళ్ళుతున్నాడు veḷḷutunnāḍu He is going | వెళ్లట్లేదు veḷlaṭlēdu He isn't going |
| 3rd person singular feminine/neuter ఆమె āme | వెళ్తోంది veḷtōndi She is going | వెళ్లట్లేదు veḷlaṭlēdu She isn't going |
| 1st person plural మేము mēmu | వెళ్తున్నాము veḷtunnāmu We are going | వెళ్లట్లేదు veḷlaṭlēdu We aren't going |
| 2nd person plural మీరు mīru | వెళ్తున్నారు veḷtunnāru You (plural) are going | వెళ్లట్లేదు veḷlaṭlēdu You (plural) aren't going |
| 3rd person plural masculine/feminine వారు vāru | వెళ్తున్నారు veḷtunnāru They (masc./fem.) are going | వెళ్లట్లేదు veḷlaṭlēdu They (masc./fem.) aren't going |
| 3rd person plural neuter అవి avi | వెళ్తున్నాయి veḷtunnāyi They (neuter) are going | వెళ్లట్లేదు veḷlaṭlēdu They (neuter) aren't going |

=== Future tense ===
| | Future tense | Future tense negative |
|---|---|---|
| 1st person singular నేను nēnu | వెళ్తాను veḷtānu I will go | వెళ్ళను veḷḷanu I won't go |
| 2nd person singular నువ్వు nuvvu | వెళ్తావు veḷtāvu You will go | వెళ్లవు veḷlavu You won't go |
| 3rd person singular masculine అతను atanu | వెళ్తాడు veḷtāḍu He will go | వెళ్ళడు veḷḷaḍu He won't go |
| 3rd person singular feminine/neuter ఆమె āme | వెళ్తుంది veḷtundi She will go | వెళ్ళదు veḷḷadu She won't go |
| 1st person plural మేము mēmu | వెళ్తాము veḷtāmu We will go | వెళ్ళము veḷḷamu We won't go |
| 2nd person plural మీరు mīru | వెళ్తారు veḷtāru You (plural) will go | వెళ్ళరు veḷḷaru You (plural) won't go |
| 3rd person plural masculine/feminine వారు vāru | వెళ్తారు veḷtāru They (masc./fem.) will go | వెళ్ళరు veḷḷaru They (masc./fem.) won't go |
| 3rd person plural neuter అవి avi | వెళ్తాయి veḷtāyi They (neuter) will go | వెళ్ళవు veḷḷavu They (neuter) won't go |

=== Imperative ===
| Informal | Formal | Informal negative | Formal negative |
|---|---|---|---|
| వెళ్ళు veḷḷu Go | వెళ్ళండి veḷḷaṇḍi Go (formal) | వెళ్ళకు veḷḷaku Don't go | వెళ్ళకండి veḷḷakaṇḍi Don't go (formal) |

=== Converbs ===
Telugu has two types of converbs, present and past. These are heavily used to form compound sentences.

| Past | Present |
|---|---|
| వెళ్ళి veḷḷi Having gone... | వెళ్తూ veḷtū While going... |

- ఇంటికి వెళ్ళి, కిరణ్ తన ఫోన్ చూసింది. iṇṭiki veḷḷi, kiraṇ tana phon cūsindi. - Kiran went home and looked at her phone.
- ఇంటికి వెళ్తూ, కిరణ్ తన ఫోన్ చూస్తోంది. iṇṭiki veḷtū, kiraṇ tana phon cūstondi. - Kiran is looking at her phone while going home.

Note that in most cases, all sub clauses using these types of converbs need to share a subject.

- *వాడు ఇంటికి వెళ్ళి, కిరణ్ తన ఫోన్ చూసింది. *vāḍu iṇṭiki veḷḷi, kiraṇ tana phon cūsindi. - *He went home and Kiran looked at her phone. (Incorrect)

=== Participles ===
Telugu forms relative clauses with participles. There are three main participles in Telugu: the perfective, the imperfective, and the negative.

Participles of veḷḷu (to go)
| Perfective | Imperfective | Negative |
|---|---|---|
| వెళ్ళిన | వెళ్ళే | వెళ్ళని |
| veḷḷina | veḷḷē | veḷḷani |

- ఇంటికి వెళ్ళిన బాలుడి పేరు సాహిల్. - Iṇṭiki veḷḷina bāluḍi pēru Sāhil. - The name of the boy who went home is Sahil.
- ఇంటికి వెళ్ళే బాలుడి పేరు సాహిల్. - Iṇṭiki veḷḷē bāluḍi pēru Sāhil. - The name of the boy who goes home is Sahil.
- ఇంటికి వెళ్ళని బాలుడి పేరు సాహిల్. - Iṇṭiki veḷḷani bāluḍi pēru Sāhil. - The name of the boy who does not go/did not go is Sahil.

Notice that the negative participle does not show tense. Context is used to disambiguate the tense in this case.

== See also ==
- Telugu language
- Telugu literature
- Telugu people
- Telugu development
- Satavahana Dynasty
- Sanskrit grammar
- Sanskrit pronouns and determiners
