= Kavitrayam =

Trio of Telugu poets

Kavitrayam (Telugu: కవిత్రయం) is a Telugu expression for trinity of poets. Kavitrayam popularly refers to the poets who translated the great epic Mahabharata into Telugu. The kavitrayam comprises Nannayya, Tikkana and Yerrapragada.

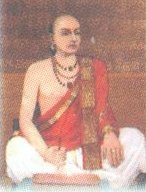
ఆదికవి నన్నయ-AdiKavi Nannaya

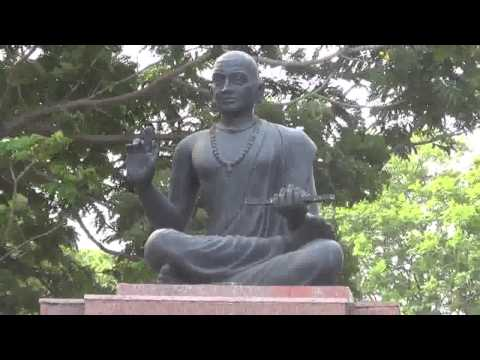
తిక్కన సోమయాజి-Thikkana somayaji

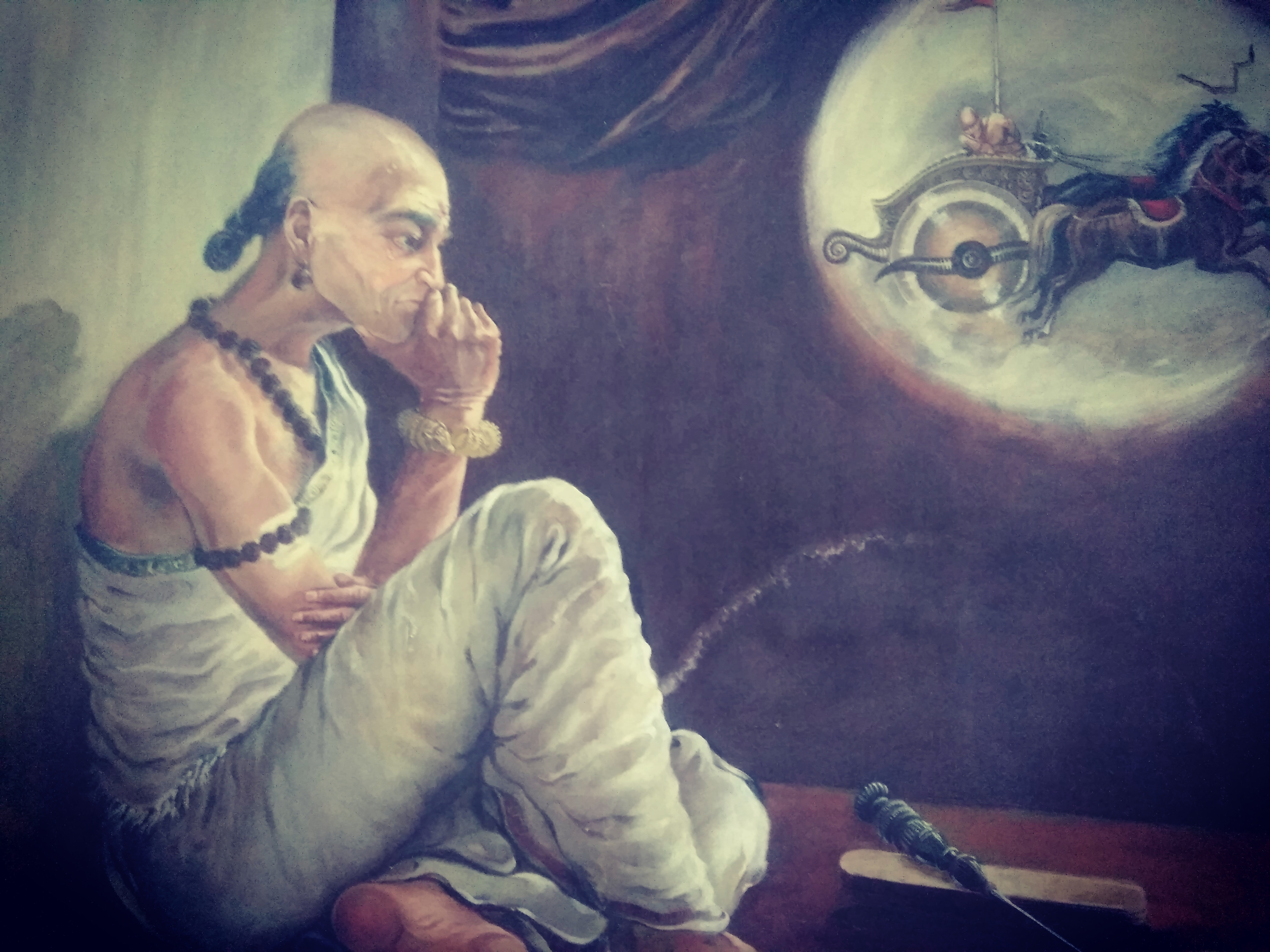
ఎర్రన - Erranna

== Nannayya ==
Nannayya was popularly hailed as the Adi Kavi or the first poet, and he belonged to Rajamahendravaram, an ancient city in East Godavari District of Andhra Pradesh. He was said to have lived during the years 1000 - 1100. Nannayya initiated the gigantic task of translation of the great epic Mahabharata into the Telugu language. But before he could translate everything, he had to revise Telugu by building new grammar rules and increase its vocabulary. Nannayya used many of the Sanskrit words directly in Telugu too. Thus Nannayya made Telugu more Sanskrit related. Thus a lot of Nannayya's years were gone in the process of building a scaffold for the great task to translate the Mahabharata. However, he was still able to translate the first 2½ parvas (chapters) into Telugu.

== Thikkana ==
Thikkana belonged to Paturu, or Kovur taluk of present day Nellore district, a territory in 13th century's Kakatiya kingdom. Thikkana took over the task from Nannayya. He translated from the 4th to 18th chapters of the Mahabharata, almost completing the last. He could start the task of translation right from day one, because Telugu was considerably an improved language by the time. However, he never attempted the 3rd chapter due to his life span, thus still leaving the task incomplete.

== Yerrapragada ==
Errana was a great Telugu poet in the court of Prolaya Vemareddy (1325–1353), the founder of Reddy dynasty (1325–1424) of Kondaveedu, who ruled Guntur, Prakasam, Nellore, and Kurnool districts with capital of Addanki. Errana was also known as Yellapregada or Errapregada. He was honored with the title Prabandha Parameswara (the supreme lord of Prabandha) and Sambudasudu. One of his greatest accomplishments were that he complete the full translation of the third chapter ending the task of getting the Mahabharatam to Telugu.

== See also ==
- Mahabharata
- Pothana
