= Vemulawada Bheemakavi =

Indian poet

- te:వేములవాడ భీమకవి
- Born: 1068 (11th century) or (12th-13th centuries); Vemulawada, Rajanna Siricilla district
- Died: India
- Citizenship: Indian
- Writing career
- Pen name: Bheemakavi
- Genre: Poet

Vemulawada Bhima alias 'Vemulawada Bheemakavi' was a Telugu poet in the 11th century AD.

== Early life ==
According to the 1829 book 'Biographical Sketches of Dekkan Poets' by Cavelly Venkata Ramaswamiehe the poet was born at Vemula Vada, in the province of Veligandala (Karimnagar). He was said to have been born to a widow.

The poet lived in the 11th century or between 12th-13th centuries.

He travelled to different foreign countries, such as Karnata, Maharatta, Sajanagar (near Peddapuram, East Godavari district which was ruled by Kalingas and Eastern Chalukyas or Vengi Chalukyas).

== Birth Place Controversy ==
First Generation scholar (1829) Cavelly Venkata Ramaswamie in his 1829 work identifies him with Lemulawada (Vemulawada, Karimnagar district). The majority of next generation scholars (1900s) such as Manavalli Ramakrishna kavi, Jayanti Ramayya Pantulu, Seshadri Ramana Kavulu too place him to be a native of Vemulawada, Karimnagar district (alias Lemulavada). The Kendra Sahitya Academy.

He was also referred to as Vemulawada, Vemulaada, Lemulawada, and Lemulaada Bheema kavi. The above four names are colloquial names of Vemulawada, Karimnagar district in modern times.

== Nizam Andhra Sabha ==
In memory of Bheemakavi, the Nizam Andhra Sabha of 1935 organized in Sircilla called the venue of the meeting as 'Bhima Kavi Nagar'.

== Literature ==
He lived after Nannayya Bhatta and prior to Tikkanna. He composed many poetic works in the Chaatuvu style. He is known to have written Raghava Pandeeveeyam, Nrusimha Puranam which are not available. He is also known for his work Kavijanasrayam, a prosody which is now ruled out to be written by him.
