= Andhra Mahabharatam =

Ancient Telugu epic

Andhra Mahabharathamu ఆంధ్ర మహాభారతము
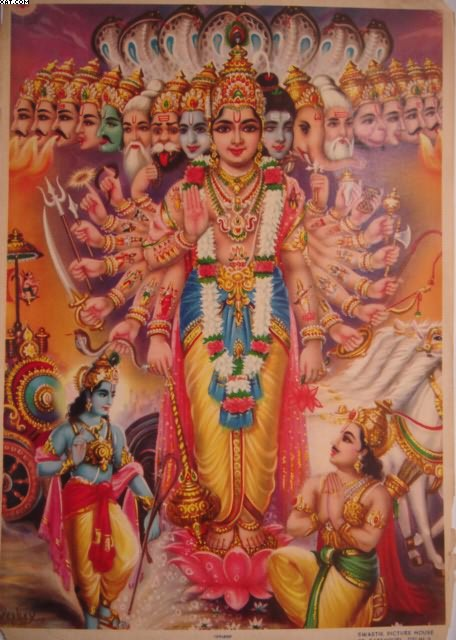
- Scene of the Bhishma Parvam of Krishna telling the Bhagavad Gita to Arjuna

Information
- Religion: Hinduism
- Author: Nannayya; Thikkana; Yerrana
- Language: Telugu
- Chapters: 18 Parvas
- Verses: 21,507 Poems

The Āndhrā Mahābhārathamu (Telugu: ఆంధ్ర మహాభారతము) is the Telugu version of the Mahabharata, written by the Kavitrayam (trinity of poets), consisting of Nannayya, Thikkana, and Yerrapragada (also known as Errana). The three poets translated the Mahabharata from Sanskrit into Telugu over the period of the 11–14th centuries CE and became idols for all the following poets. Rather than a stanza-by-stanza translation, the Āndhrā Mahābhārathamu is a Telugu rendering that preserves the Mahabharata's core narrative. These three poets wrote the Andhra Mahabharatham in the Telugu literature style, but kept the same essence as the Sanskrit Mahabharatham.

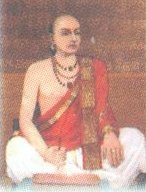
Adikavi Nannaya

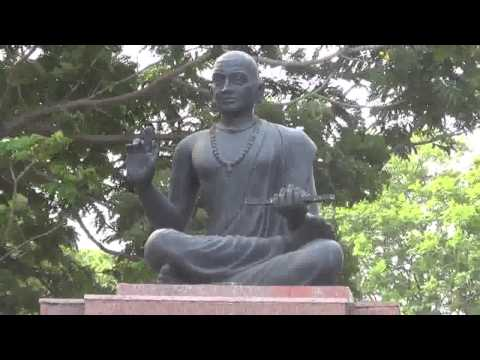
Thikkana Somayaji

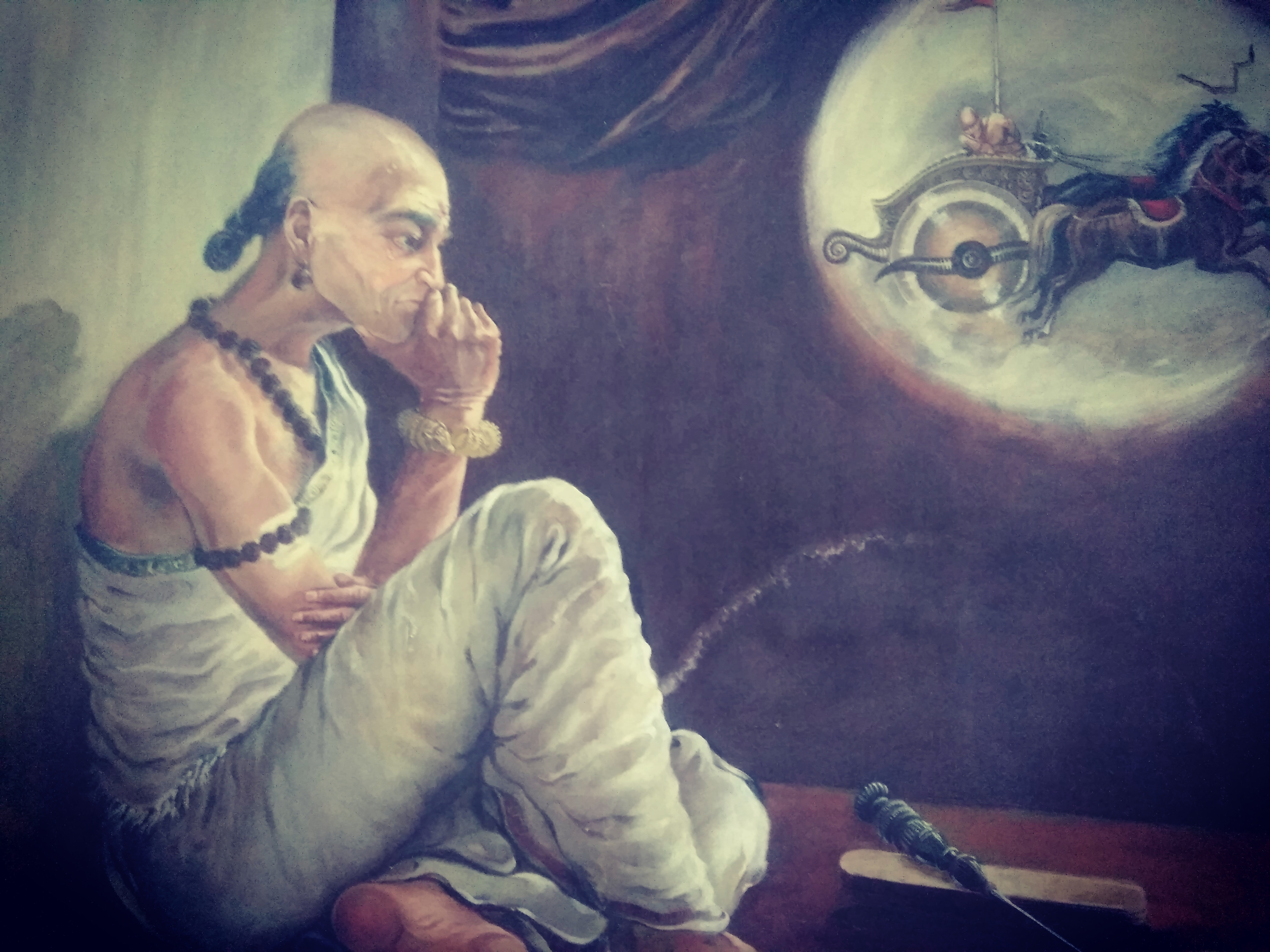
Erranna

== Adikavyam in Telugu ==
There are doubts about whether the Mahabharata is the first work of poetry started by Nannaya in Telugu. Literary historians believe that mature poetry does not emerge all at once, so there must have been some poems before that. However, no other writings have been found, except for references to songs and poems (Nannechodudu) and some verses found in inscriptions. So, Nannaya was adored by the world of Telugu literature as the original poet. Prajnannaya Yugam Dwadasi Nageswara Sastry writes this in concluding the chapter - "On the whole, Telugu language literature existed before Nannaya. Oral literature was more prevalent. Edictal poetry was in use. The Telugu language was good in public affairs. But scriptural language could not have been created. Conditions were suitable for such a creation. No. It could be that the reason for that is the familiarity with Sanskrit Prakrits."

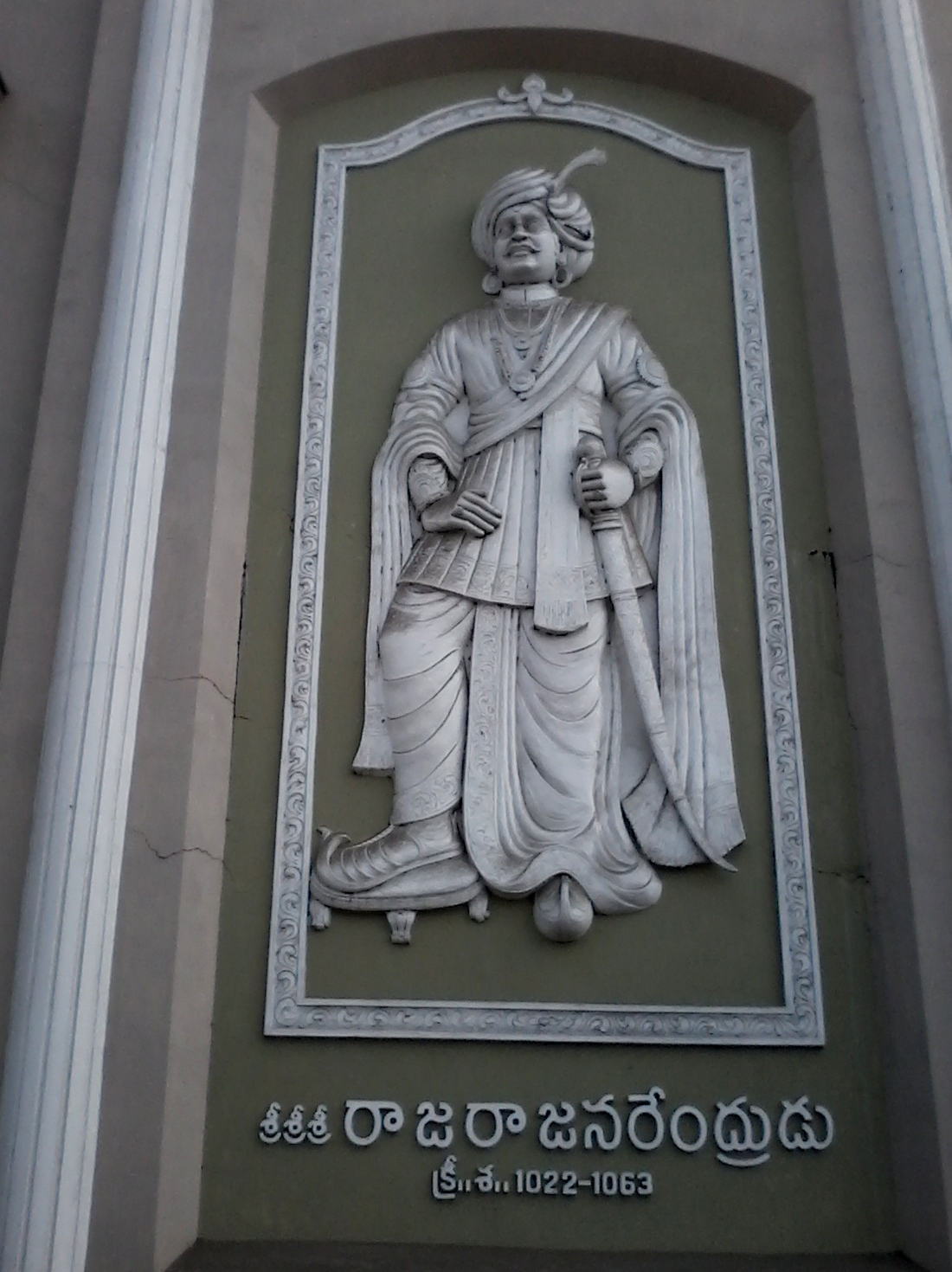
Raja Raja Narendra (1019–1061 CE) who asked Nannaya to write the Mahabharatam in Telugu

== Kavithrayam at work ==
Nannaya wrote Adi Parvam, Sabaparvam, and a part of Aranyaparvam between 1054 and 1061 CE, when he died. Later, in the 13th century, Tikkana left the remainder of Aranyaparvam and wrote 15 parvams from Virata Parvam to Svargarohana Parvam. After that, in the 14th century, Errana completed the remainder of Aranyaparvam. Thus, these three poets of that age are worshiped by the Telugu poets as kavitrayam. This way, Telugu people are fortunate to be able to read Andhra Mahabharatham, written by three poets over a period of two and a half centuries, as a single book, as if a single mahakavi had written it in a single period. The Sanskrit Mahabharata is famous for being a book of 100 parvas and having a breadth of 100,000 verses. Parvanukramanika, told by Nannaya in Adi Parvam, is also close to this point. There are hundreds of main parvas and subparvas together. In it, Harivamsa Parvam is included in Bhavishya Parvam. Together, these two are considered an independent text, called Khilavansa Purana. Nannaya does not include the Harivamsa in his genealogy. He arranges one hundred parvas in his Ashtadasa Parva Vibhaktam. The Upaparva section is not followed in Telugu. The Tikkanadus followed Nannaya's decision. Errana wrote the Harivamsa as a separate treatise. In this way, the Sanskrit Mahabharata of 100 subparvas was transformed into the Andhra Mahabharata of eighteen parvas in Telugu. It is divided into Asvasas in Telugu. The division can be seen in the following table.

Parvam	Number of subparvas	Number of Shlokas in Sanskrit Mahabharatham	Number of Asvasas in Andhra Mahabharatham	Verse Prose no
1. Adi Parvam	18	9,984	8	2,084
2. Sabha Parvam	9	4,311	2	618
3. Aranya Parvam	16	13,664	7	2,894
4. Virata Parvam	4	3,500	5	1,624
5. Udyoga Parvam	11	6,998	4	1,562
6. Bhishma Parvam	5	5,884	3	1,171
7. Drona Parvam	8	10,919	5	1,860
8. Karna Parvam	1	4,900	3	1,124
9. Salya Parvam	4	3,220	2	827
10. Sauptika Parvam	3	2,874	2	376
11. Stri Parvam	5	1,775	2	376
12.Shanti Parvam	4	14,525	6	3,093
13. Anushasanika Parvam	2	12,000	5	2,148
14. Ashwamedha Parvam	2	4,420	4	976
15. Ashramavasa Parvam	3	1,106	2	362
16. Mausala Parvam	1	300	1	226
17.Mahaprasthanika Parvam	1	120	1	79
18. Svargarohana Parvam	1	200	1	97
19. Bhavishya Parvam	2	(Omitted)	--	--
Total	100	1,00,500	63	21,507

== Nannaya — the Adi Kavi (the first poet) ==
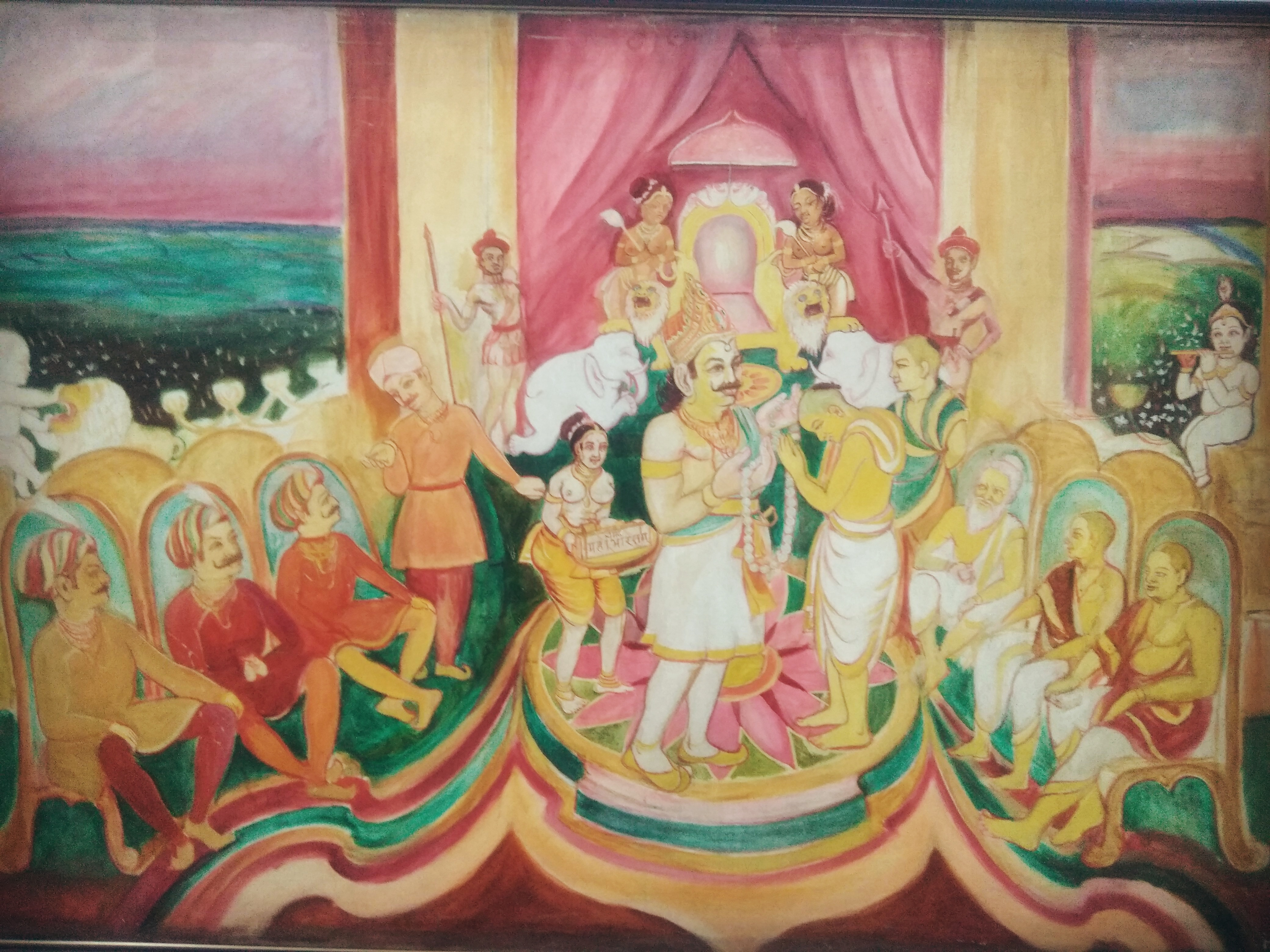
Raja Rajanarendra commissioning Nannaya Battaraka to render Mahabharatha into Telugu.

Nannayabhatta (1022–1063 CE – also referred to as Nannaya) started to translate the Sanskrit Mahabharata into Telugu at the request of the East Chalukya king Rajaraja Narendra. This marks the earliest known beginning of Telugu literary tradition in writing. The work is composed in the Champu style and shows such literary polish that several scholars consider it probable that earlier literary works existed in Telugu before Nannaya.

== Tikkana ==
Tikkana (or Tikkana Somayaji) (1205–1288) was a 13th-century Telugu poet and minister of the Nellore Chola ruler Manumasiddhi II. Born into a Telugu-speaking Niyogi Brahmin family, he was the second poet of the "Trinity of Poets (Kavi Trayam)" that translated the Mahabharata into Telugu. Nannaya Bhattaraka, the first, translated two and a half chapters of the Mahabharata. Tikkana translated the final 15 chapters but did not undertake translating the half-finished Aranya Parvamu. The Telugu people remained without this last translation for more than a century, until it was translated by Errana.

== Yerrana ==
Yarrapragada Erranna was a Telugu poet in the court of King Prolaya Vema Reddy (1325–1353). The surname of Erranna was Yerrapragada or Yerrana, which are epithets of the fair-skinned Skanda in the Telugu language, but became attached to his paternal family due to it having notable members with fair or red-skinned complexions. He was honoured with the titles Prabandha-paramēśvara ("Master of historical anecdotes") and Śambhudāsuḍu ("Servant of Lord Śiva"). The Sanskrit Mahabharata was translated into Telugu over a period of several centuries (from the 11th to 14th centuries CE). Erranna was one of the kavitrayam ("Trinity of Poets") who translated the Mahabharata from Sanskrit into Telugu. The other two poets were Nannaya and Tikkana of the Andhra Mahabharatam ("Andhra Mahabharat"). Tikkana translated the remaining books starting from the 4th, leaving the third book titled the Aranya Parvamu ("Book of the Forest"), half-finished, for Erranna to complete. Tikkana did not touch this part because it was considered to be inauspicious to translate this book, which was left half-finished by Nannaya. Erranna started the remaining half of the Aranya Parvamu with the style of Nannaya and ended it with the style of Tikkana as a bridge between the parts translated by Nannaya and Tikkana. Just like Nannaya and Tikkanna, he used half Sanskrit and half Telugu in his Telugu translation of the Sanskrit Mahabharata. He translated the Harivamsamu and Ramayanamu from Sanskrit, dedicating both works to the founder of the Reddy Dynasty, King Prolaya Vemareddy.

Nrusimhapuranamu was his own independent work. Erranna received his inspiration for the Nrusimhapuranam from his grandfather Errapotanna. According to tradition, one day when Erranna was meditating, his grandfather appeared and advised him to write the Narisimhapuranamu. This work was based on the Brahmandapuranamu and the Vishnupuranamu.

According to the Viṣṇu Purāṇa, King Hiraṇyakaśipu was the powerful demonic sovereign of the Earth millions of year ago at the beginning of the Yuga Cycle. The subjects of the Earth were described as Manavas ("descendants of Manu"; "humans"). The subjects of King Indra were described as Devatas. King Hiraṇyakaśipu fought a war with King Indra and, having emerged victorious, took over the heavenly planets. Under the rule of King Hiraṇyakaśipu, most of the Devatas either "converted to" or disguised themselves as Manavas out of fear of King Hiraṇyakaśipu. Another contemporary of King Hiraṇyakaśipu was also gatekeeper of Śvetadvīpa, the Vaikuṇṭha planet in this universe, in a previous life, Śrī-hari who ruled in the Kṣīra-sāgara (the "Sea of Milk").

== See also ==
ఆంధ్ర మహాభారతం
