= Rajaraja Narendra =

Eastern Chalukya emperor from 1022 to 1061

- Kavi Poshaka; Parachakrakesari
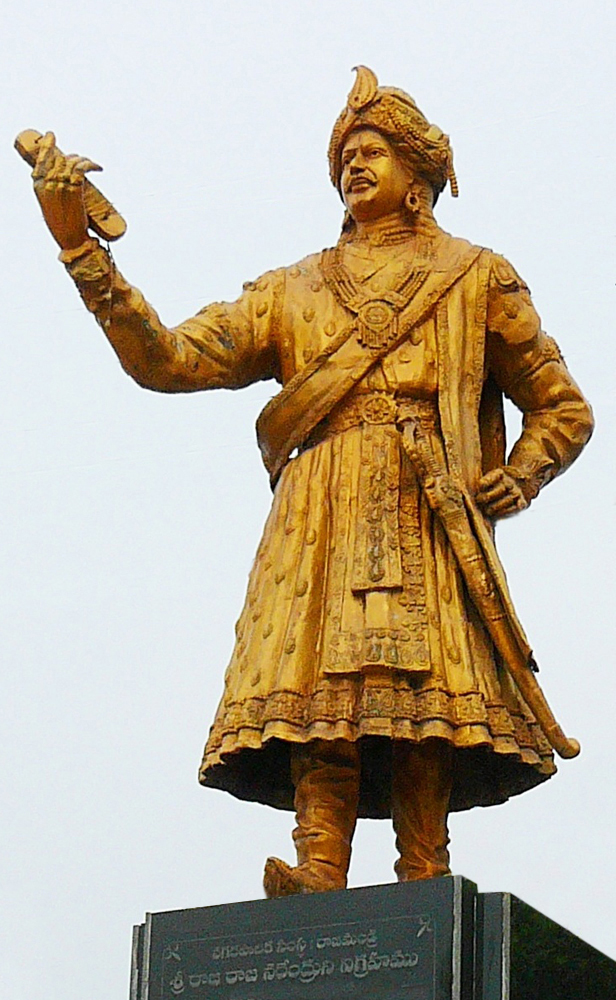
- Statue of king Rajaraja Narendra founder of Rajahmahendravaram city

Eastern Chalukya Emperor
- Reign: 16 August 1022–1061
- Predecessor: Vimaladithya
- Successor: Rajendra Chalukyudu
- Died: 1061
- Spouses: Ammanga Devi
- Issue: Rajendra Chalukyudu
- Dynasty: Eastern Chalukyas
- Father: Vimaladithya
- Mother: Kundavai

Rajaraja Narendra (died 1061) was an Eastern Chalukya king of the Vengi kingdom in present-day Andhra Pradesh. He founded the city of Rajahmahendravaram (Rajahmundry), and his reign is noted for its significant contributions to social and cultural heritage. Narendra requested his teacher, advisor, and court poet Nannayya to translate the Mahabharata into Telugu as Andhra Mahabharatam.

== Early life ==
Rajaraja Narendra belonged to the Eastern Chalukya dynasty.

On the maternal side, he is the grandson of Rajaraja Chola I. Amangai Devi, daughter of Rajendra I, married Rajaraja Narendra, the son of Vimalathitha Chalukya. The feudal relationship between the Cholas and Chalukyas continued for three centuries from Arinjaya Chola onwards.

== Descendants ==
Rajaraja Narendra's son was Rajendra Chalukya, also known as Kulottunga Chola I, raided Kedah (Malaysia) for his maternal uncle. He became the king of the Chola Empire in Gangaikondacholapuram when a political vacuum occurred and merged the Chola and Chalukya dynasties.

The Aravidu dynasty of Vijayanagara Empire claimed descent from Rajaraja Narendra. However, unlike their claimed ancestor, who belonged to the Manavya gotra, they belonged to the Atreya gotra.

== Literary patronage ==
The Eastern Chalukya dynasty supported Shaivism and Jainism. He respected religious priests and promoted the Telugu, and Sanskrit languages and religions. Rajaraja Narendra requested his teacher, advisor, and court poet Nannayya Bhattaraka to translate the Mahabharata into Telugu Andhra Mahabharatam. However, Nannayya was only able to translate two and a half parvas of the epic.

== See also ==
- Eastern Chalukyas
- Chalukyas
- Cholas
- Rajamahendravaram
- Sarangadhara
