= Tikkana =

Telugu poet (1205–1288)

Tikkana Somayji
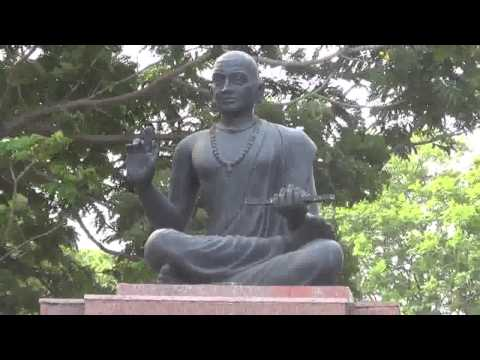
- Image of Tikkana
- Born: 1205; Paturu, Kovur, Nellore district, Kakatiya Kingdom
- Died: 1288 (aged 82–83); Paturu, Kovur, Nellore district, Kakatiya Kingdom
- Occupation: Poet
- Writing career
- Pen name: Tikkana (Thikka Sharma)
- Notable work: Andhra mahabharatam

Tikkana (1205–1288), also known as Tikkana Somayaji, was a 13th century Telugu poet. Born into a Telugu-speaking Niyogi Brahmin family . He was the second poet of the "Trinity of Poets (Kavi Trayam)" that translated Mahabharata into Telugu. Nannaya Bhattaraka, the first, translated two and a half chapters of Mahabharata. Tikkana translated the final 15 chapters, under the Kakatiya's tributary Cholas of Nellore but did not undertake translating the half-finished Aranya Parvamu. The Telugu people remained without this last translation for more than a century, until it was translated by Errana.

Tikkana is also called Tikkana Somayaji, as he completed the Somayaga. Tikkana's titles were Kavibrahma and Ubhaya Kavi Mitrudu.

== Religious conflict ==
Tikkana was born in 1205 in Patur village, Kovur, Nellore district during the Golden Age of the Kakatiya dynasty. During this time conflict occurred between the two sects of Sanātana Dharma, Shaivism and Vaishnavism. Tikkana attempted to bring peace to the warring Shivaites and Vaishnavites.

== Political situation ==
Tikkana was a minister of the Nellore Choda ruler Manuma-siddhi II. In 1248, Manuma-siddhi II faced multiple rebellions, and lost control of his capital. He faced Tikkana as an emissary to the court of his overlord, the Kakatiya king Ganapati-deva. Ganapati received Tikkana warmly, and sent an army that re-established Manuma-siddhi II on the throne of Nellore.

== Writing style ==
His writing style was mostly Telugu, unlike Nannayya whose work was mostly sanskritized. Tikkana used Telugu words even to express very difficult ideas. He used Telugu words and parables extensively.

In the colophons of his work, Tikkana calls himself "a friend to both [kinds of] poets" (Ubhaya-kavi-mitra). The meaning of this phrase is not clear: it may refer to Sanskrit and Telugu poets; or Shaivite and non-Shaivite poets; or Brahmin and non-Brahmin poets; or folk poets and scholarly poets.

== Legacy and depictions in popular culture ==
The 15th or 16th century poet Nutana-kavi Suranna claimed descent from Tikkana.

There is a library named after him in Guntur. It is maintained by a committee headed by Machiraju Sitapati and Kurakula Guraviah, an ex-corporator. In 2013 they celebrated 100 years of the library's functioning. There was a television series made on the life of Tikkana.

== See also ==
- Kavitrayam
- Telugu literature
