= Arya metre =

Metre in Sanskrit and Prakrit verses

Āryā metre is a metre used in Sanskrit, Prakrit and Marathi verses. A verse in āryā metre is in four metrical lines called pādas. Unlike the majority of metres employed in classical Sanskrit, the āryā metre is based on the number of mātrās (morae) per pāda. A short syllable counts for one mātrā, and a long syllable (that is, one containing a long vowel, or a short vowel followed by two consonants) counts for two mātrās. It is believed that āryā metre was taken from the gāthā metre of Prakrit. Āryā metre is common in Jain Prakrit texts and hence considered as favourite metre of early authors of Jainism. The earlier form of the āryā metre is called old gīti, which occurs in some very early Prakrit and Pāli texts.

== Āryā ==
The basic āryā verse has 12, 18, 12 and 15 mātrās in the first, second, third, and fourth pādas respectively. An example is the following from Kālidāsa's play Abhijñānaśākuntalam (c. 400 CE):

आ परितोषाद्विदुषां न साधु मन्ये प्रयोगविज्ञानम् ।
बलवदपि शिक्षितानामात्मन्यप्रत्ययं चेतः ॥ २ ॥

āparitoṣād viduṣāṃ
na sādhu manye prayogavijñānaṃ
balavadapi śikṣitānām
ātmany apratyayaṃ cetaḥ

– u u | – – | u u –
u – u | – – | u – u | – – | –
u u u u | u – u | – –
– – | – – | u | – – | –

"I do not consider skill in the representation of plays to be good (perfect) until (it causes) the satisfaction of the learned (audience); the mind of even those who are very well instructed has no confidence in itself."

Another example is from Nīlakaṇṭha Dīkṣita's Vairāgya-śataka (17th century CE):

नीतिज्ञा नियतिज्ञा वेदज्ञा अपि भवन्ति शास्त्रज्ञाः ।
ब्रह्मज्ञा अपि लभ्या स्वाज्ञानज्ञानिनो विरलाः ॥

nītijñā niyatijñā
vēdajñā api bhavanti vedajñāḥ
brahmajñā api labhyā
svājñāna-jñānino viralāḥ

– – | – u u | – –
– – | – u u | u – u | – – | –
– – | – u u | – –
– – | – – | u | – u u | –

"People who know morality, know the inner order of conduct, know the Vedas (sacred knowledge), know the Scriptures or know the Supreme Spirit Himself are plentiful; but rare are those who know about their own ignorance."

The metrical treatise Vṛttaratnākara lays down several other conditions:

1. Odd numbered mātrā-gaṇas should not be ja-gaṇa (u – u).
2. The sixth gaṇa should be ja-gaṇa.

== Gīti ==
The gīti metre has 12, 18, 12 and 18 mātrās in its four pādas respectively.

Vṛttaratnākara lists several other conditions.

== Upagīti ==
The upagīti metre has 12, 15, 12 and 15 mātrās in its four pādas respectively.

Vṛttaratnākara lists several other conditions.

== Udgīti ==
The udgīti metre has 12, 15, 12 and 18 mātrās in its four pādas respectively.

Vṛttaratnākara lists several other conditions.

== Āryāgīti ==
The āryāgīti metre has 12, 20, 12 and 20 mātrās in its four pādas respectively.

Vṛttaratnākara lists several other conditions.

== See also ==
- Jain Prakrit
- Vedic metre
- Jain Agamas
