= Yerrapragada =

14th-century Telugu poet

Yerrapragada Yerrana
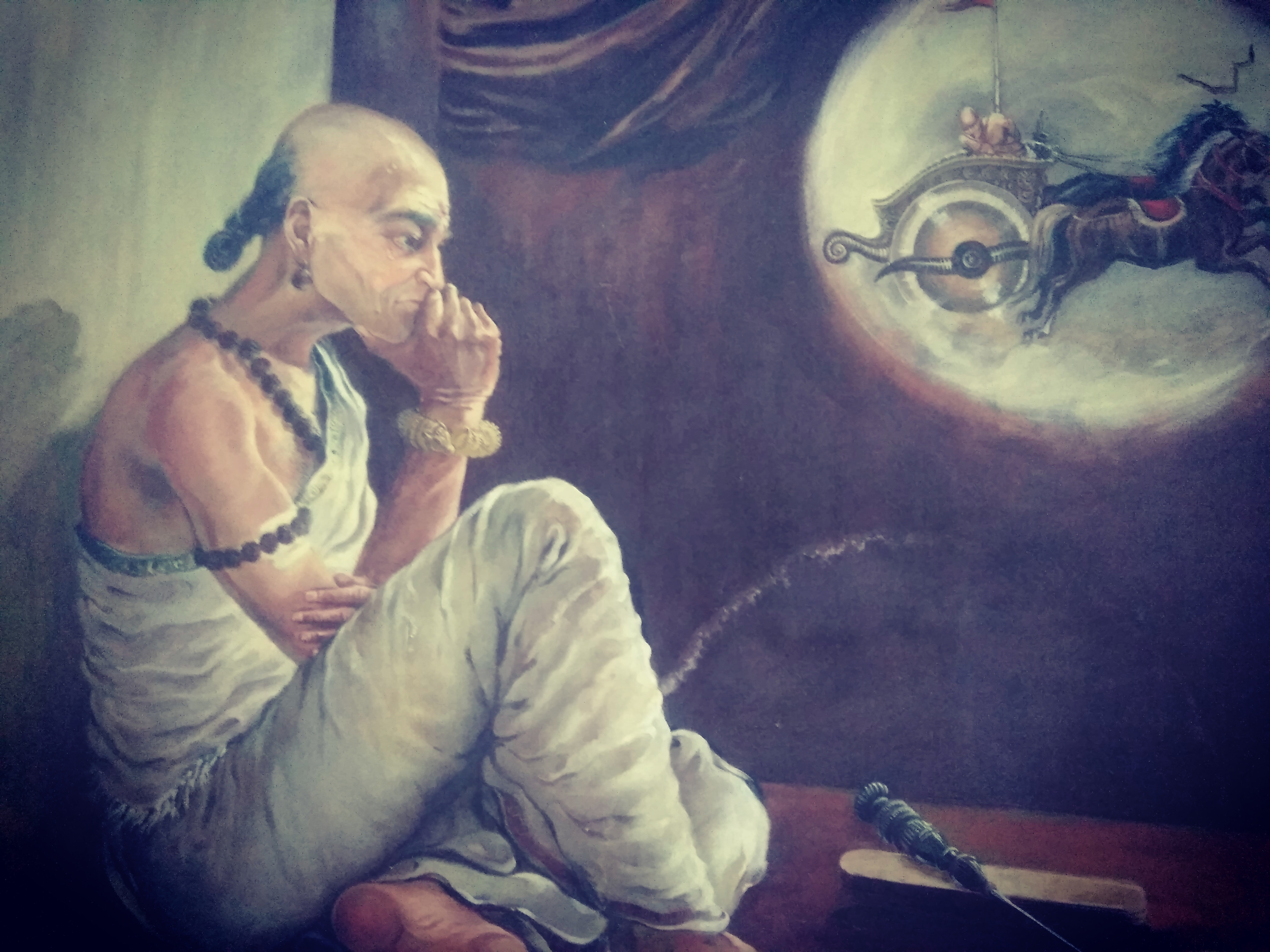
- Born: Erranna Yerrana
- Occupations: Poet, writer
- Writing career
- Period: Reddi Kingdom (1325–1353)
- Genre: Poet
- Notable work: Andhra Mahabharatam

Yarrapragada or Erranna was a Telugu poet in the court of King Prolaya Vema Reddy (1325–1353). The surname of Erranna was Yerrapragada or Yerrana, which are epithets of the fair-skinned Lord Skanda in the Telugu language, but became attached to his paternal family due its having notable members with fair or red-skinned complexions. He translated the Aranya Parva part of Mahabharata from Sanskrit to Telugu. He was bestowed with the title of Prabandha-paramēśvara ("Master of historical anecdotes") and Śambhudāsuḍu ("Servant of Lord Śiva").

== Birth and family ==
Errapragada Erranna was born in the village of Gudlur, located in Pakanadu (presently Nellore district), and later lived in Chadalawada. He was a member of the Smarta Brahmin caste. His family were Smarta Brahmins and they worshipped both Shiva and Vishnu.

== See also ==
- Reddy dynasty
- Telugu literature
- Kavitrayam
