= Romanisation of Telugu =

Representation of Telugu using the Latin script

There are several systems for romanisation of the Telugu script.

== Vowels ==
Independent	With క (k)	ISO	IPA	Independent	With క (k)	ISO	IPA
అ	క (ka)	a	/a/	ఆ	కా (kā)	ā	/aː/
ఇ	కి (ki)	i	/i/	ఈ	కీ (kī)	ī	/iː/
ఉ	కు (ku)	u	/u/	ఊ	కూ (kū)	ū	/uː/
ఋ	కృ (kr̥)	r̥	/ɾu/	ౠ	కౄ (kr̥̄)	r̥̄	/ɾuː/
ఌ	కౢ (kl̥)	l̥	/lu/	ౡ	కౣ (kl̥̄)	l̥̄	/luː/
ఎ	కె (ke)	e	/e/	ఏ	కే (kē)	ē	/eː/
ఐ	కై (kai)	ai	/aj/	ఒ	కొ (ko)	o	/o/
ఓ	కో (kō)	ō	/oː/	ఔ	కౌ (kau)	au	/aw/

== Consonants ==
ISO	k	kh	g	gh	ṅ	c	ch	j	jh	ñ	ṭ	ṭh	ḍ	ḍh	ṇ	t	th	d	dh	n	ṉ	p	ph	b	bh	m	y	r	ṟ	l	ḷ	ḻ	v	ś	ṣ	s	h
IPA	k	kʰ	ɡ	ɡʱ	ŋ	tʃ	tʃʰ	dʒ	dʒʱ	ɲ	ʈ	ʈʰ	ɖ	ɖʱ	ɳ	t	tʰ	d	dʱ	n	n̪	p	pʰ	b	bʱ	m	j	ɾ	r	l	ɭ	ɻ	ʋ	s	ʂ	s	ɦ
Telugu	క	ఖ	గ	ఘ	ఙ	చ	ఛ	జ	ఝ	ఞ	ట	ఠ	డ	ఢ	ణ	త	థ	ద	ధ	న		ప	ఫ	బ	భ	మ	య	ర	ఱ	ల	ళ		వ	శ	ష	స	హ

=== Irregular Consonants ===
Telugu	ISO 15919	ITRANS
క్ష	kṣa	kSa / kSha / xa
జ్ఞ	jña	GYa / j~na

== Other diacritics ==
- Virama (్) mutes the vowel of a consonant, so that only the consonant is pronounced. Example: క + ్ → క్ or [ka] + [∅] → [k].
- Anusvara (ం) nasalize the vowels or syllables to which they are attached. Example: క + ం → కం or [ka] + [m] → [kam]
- Candrabindu (ఁ) also nasalize the vowels or syllables to which they are attached. Example: క + ఁ → కఁ or [ka] + [n] → [kan].
- Visarga (ః) adds a voiceless breath after the vowel or syllable it is attached to. Example: క + ః → కః or [ka] + [h] → [kah]

== UN romanisation for geographical names ==
The United Nations romanisation systems for geographical names (approved 1972, I1/11; amended in 1977 IH/12) was based on a report prepared by D. N. Sharma.

The UN romanisation uses macrons for long vowels ā ī ū, a dot under ṛ for vocalic r, and caron on ĕ and ŏ.

ka kā ki kī ku kū kṛ kĕ ke kai kŏ ko kau

== ISO ==
There are differences between the UN system and the ISO transliteration standard ISO 15919: 2001

== ITRANS ==
ITRANS also has transliteration for Telugu.

== RTS ==
Used in Vemuri Rao's English-Telugu Dictionary (2002) Rice University's Reverse Transliteration System (RTS) (created by Ramarao Kanneganti and Ananda Kishore) can be used for the transliteration of Telugu into Roman script as an alternative to phonetic alphabet. The RTS is defined below. (1) Represent short vowels by the lower case ..."

- RTS represents short vowels by the lower case English character and long vowels by the corresponding upper case character: అ = a, ఆ = A; etc.
- Unaspirated consonant-vowel pairs are represented by a lower case letter followed by a suitable vowel.

The result is a phonetic representation mostly suitable for dictionaries and computer input methods. Examples:

- vaiDUryaM
- gOmEdhikaM
