= Bahmani invasion of Orissa =

1475–1481 Bahmani military campaign

Bahmani invasion of Odisha
- Part of Bahmani-Gajapati conflicts
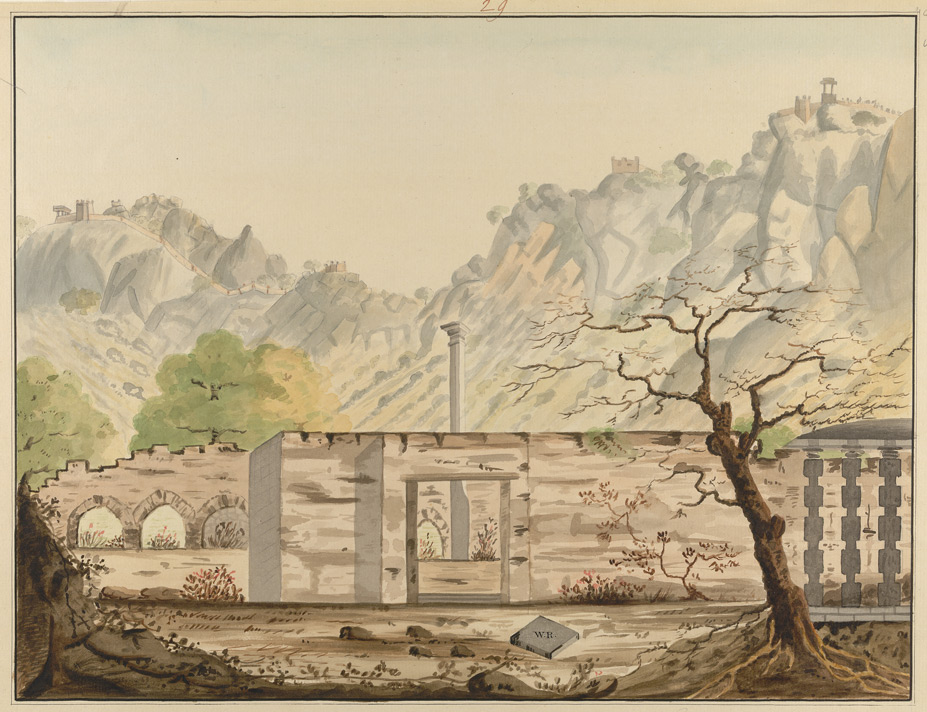
- Water colour painting of Kondaveedu Fort, where Hamvira Deva was besieged.
Date	1475–1481
Location	Telangana, Andhra Pradesh and Odisha 16.254459°N 80.263866°E
Result	Bahmani victory
Territorial changes	Rajahmundry and Kondavidu annexed to Bahmani Sultanate

Belligerents
Bahmani Sultanate	Gajapati Empire; Zamindars of Telangana; Zamindars of Jajnagar

Commanders and leaders
Mahmud Gawan; Muhammad Shah III; Nizam-ul-Mulk Bahri; Muhibullah	Purushottama Deva (surrendered); Hamvira Deva (surrendered); Bhimraj

Strength
First encounter 20,000 cavalry Second encounter 20,000 cavalry	First encounter 700,000 Soldiers; 500 Elephants; Second encounter 10,000 cavalry 8,000 footmen
- Location of Kondaveedu Fort Bahmani invasion of Orissa (India)

The Bahmani invasion of Odisha refers to a series of historical events in the 15th century, marked by conflicts and diplomatic manœuvres between the Gajapati Empire and the Bahmani Sultanate. In 1475, a rebel officer of Bahmani named Bhimraj, revolted at Kondaveedu, a Bahmani territory, prompting a complex alliance among the Gajapatis and chiefs of Telangana and Jajnagar. Tensions escalated further in 1478 when Muhammad Shah III Lashkari invaded Odisha, and Purushottama Dev, alarmed by the invasion, offered homage, disarming and presenting gifts. The Sultan accepted the homage, confirming Purushottam as the ruler of his patrimony.

== Background ==
Purushottam Deva became the second King of the Gajapati Empire following the demise of his father, Kapilendra Deva. In 1461, seizing an opportunity presented by the death of Bahmani Sultan Humayun Shah, Kapilendra initiated an invasion against the Bahmanis, capitalizing on the youth of their king, Nizam Shah. However, the invasion faced a setback when Bahmani minister Mahmud Gawan deployed forces to resist the Gajapatis, leading to their defeat. Consequently, Kapilendra surrendered and withdrew to his own territories. Nizam Shah's reign was brief, and on July 30, 1463, he was succeeded by his younger brother, Muhammad Shah III Lashkari.

In 1475, Bhimraj (also known as Hamid Rai), a rebel, staged a revolt at Kondavidu, a Bahmani territory, where he killed the Bahmani officials at the fort. Recognizing the Bahmani threat, Bhimraj sought assistance from Purushottam. He persuaded Purushottam by highlighting the prevailing famine in Deccan, anticipating challenges for the Sultan's forces. Consequently, Purushottam forged an alliance with the chiefs of Telangana and Jajnagar, leading a march towards Bahmani territories.

== Conflicts ==
=== First encounter (1476) ===
Muhammad III sent a force led by his commander Nizam-ul-Mulk Bahri, but they were defeated by the Gajapatis, compelling a retreat to Wazirabad, Telangana. An inscription at Simhachalam dated A.D. 1476 proves that the Gajapati King Purushottama was on his way to Rajahmundry and had reached that place, where he made offerings to god Narasimha, no doubt for the success of his arms. Ferishta's accounts read with those of the Burhan-i-Ma’asir indicate that there was an Oriya invasion of the south-eastern portion of the Bahamani kingdom in A.D. 1476 or A.D. 1477 and in consequence the Bahamani Sultan lost both Rajahmundry and Kondavidu provinces. In response, the Sultan directed the army to advance to Malikpur near Ashtur. Acting on Mahmud Gawan's counsel, the Sultan personally led the forces marching toward Rajahmundri. Witnessing the Sultan's army approaching, Bhimraj was compelled to retreat towards the Kondavidu fort.

The Gajapati forces, comprising 700,000 foot soldiers and 500 elephants, were stationed near the Godavari River. Sultan Muhammad Shah, accompanied by Muhibullah, marched against the Gajapati forces with 20,000 men. Faced with a defensive trench, the Sultan dispatched Darya Khan, his general, to attack the rear of the Gajapatis. Subsequently, the Gajapati army was routed to Rajahmundry fortress and further isolated, forcing Purushottam to surrender. Rajahmundry was given to Nizam-ul Mulk Bahri as a governor of Bahmanis.

=== Second encounter (1477) ===
However, the peace was short-lived. In 1477, Muhammad Shah III launched an invasion into Orissa, penetrating its heart. Alarmed by this, Purushottam expressed his willingness to pay homage to the Sultan, offering to disarm and presenting costly gifts along with a large number of elephants. The Sultan accepted Raya's homage, confirming him as the ruler of his patrimony. On the Sultan's return, he encountered an Orissa fortress whose garrison chose to fight rather than surrender, leading the Sultan to lay siege to it. Upon learning of this, Purushottam sent sincere apologies to Muhammad Shah, begging him to take possession of the fort and, if he wished, to return it as his vassal. Muhammad Shah III demanded 25 elephants, the finest from his father's stable, as a condition for withdrawal. The Gajapati had to concede to this demand, and Muhammad withdrew his forces after securing the elephants.

=== Third encounter (1481) ===
In 1481, Muhammad Shah III's next objective was the reduction of Kondavidu, held by Hamvira Deva, the brother of Purushottam, who facilitated him by plundering a portion of this territory. Muhammad initiated a five-month-long siege of the fort, compelling Hamvira to surrender, marking the end of Hamvira's career.

== See also ==
- Sharqi invasions of Orissa
- Hoshang Shah's invasion of Orissa

== Aftermath ==
In the aftermath of the conflicts, the Bahmanis secured Rajahmundry and Kondavidu, along with tribute from the Gajapati ruler. Notably, they ended the career of Hamvira, who had defected to the side of his brother Purushottam. This marked a significant shift, considering Hamvira's previous alliance with the Bahmanis in his pursuit of the throne.
