= Hamvira Deva =

Gajapati emperor from 1472 to 1476

- Patrudu

Gajapati emperor
- Reign: October 1472 – 1476
- Predecessor: Purushottama Deva
- Successor: Purushottama Deva
- Issue: Kumara Kapileshwara Mahapatra; Narhari Patra
- House: Suryavansha
- Father: Kapilendra Deva
- Mother: Parvati Devi
- Religion: Hinduism
- Military career
- Conflicts: Battle of Devarakonda

Hamvira Deva was an Odia prince of the Gajapati Empire in India and a Gajapati ruler for a brief period. He was the eldest son of Kapilendra Deva, the founder of the Gajapati Empire. He played a vital role in the empire's military expansion, but was bypassed in the succession in favour of his younger half-brother, Purushottama Deva.

== Life ==
Hamvira Deva was the eldest son of emperor Kapilendra Deva, founder of the Gajapati Empire and the supposed heir apparent. Hamvira Deva often carried out military campaigns against enemy kingdoms and expanded the empire greatly. He was governor of the southern provinces of the Gajapati Empire before 1464. He had a son named Kumara Kapileshwara who helped him on military campaigns and later became governor of the southern provinces of the empire. He also had a son named Narhari Patra who survived him and was captured by the Vijayanagara army of Krishnadevaraya when they conquered the Kodavidu fort in 1516 from the Gajapati emperor Prataprudra Deva.

== Military career ==
Hamvira carried out several successful military campaigns when he was governor of the southern provinces until 1464.

=== Bahmanis ===
In 1449, the Malwa Sultanate under Mahmud Khalji invaded the Bahmani Sultanate under Humayun Shah. He raided Bidar twice in the 1460s with the assistance of the Recherla Nayakas of Telangana.

In 1481, Muhammad III invaded and besieged the Kondavidu fort which was commanded under Hamvira. This invasion took place after his invasion on Orissa. The Bahmanis defeated Hamvira and he was forced to surrender. Hamvira'a career ended in tragedy as this was the last military engagement of Hamvira.

=== Reddi Kingdom ===
The Kondavidu fort, one of the strongest forts in South India, was under the control of the Reddis, who were vassals under the suzerainty of Deva Raya II of Vijayanagar.

Deva Raya II was a capable ruler who defeated the first Gajapati invasion. Kapilendra Deva appointed prince Hamvira Deva to annex the southern kingdoms to his empire. Deva Raya II's successor Mallikarjuna Raya was a weak monarch. Hamvira Deva took advantage of this and attacked Rajahmundry under Veerabhadra Reddi and conquered it in 1448. He appointed his cousin Raghudeva Narendra Mohapatra as its governor.

=== Vijayanagara ===
Hamvira attacked Kondavidu fort in 1454 and successfully captured it, despite the Reddis being assisted in the battle by Vijayanagar. He then appointed Ganadeva Routray as the fort's governor.

According to the Anantavaram grant, the forts of Chandragiri, Padavidu, Valudularnpatti, Usavadi, Tiruvarur and Tiruchilapalli and the city of Kanchi fell to Hamvira. The conquered region was placed under the charge of Hamvira's son Kumara Kapileshwara Mahapatra.

When Mallikarjuna Raya succeeded to the Vijayanagara throne, Kapilendra Deva sought to take advantage of the weak ruler and sent Hamvira Deva along with support of the Bahmani Sultanate to the Vijayanagara capital of Hampi. Sources differ on the outcome of this conflict, with the Anantavaram copper plates of the Gajapatis stating that Hamvira conquered Hampi and forced Mallikarjuna Raya to pay tribute. However, the Gangadasa-Vilasa Charitam authored by the Vijaynagara poet Gangadhar states that his patron Mallikarjuna Raya sallied from the capital during the siege and routed the combined forces of the Gajapatis and Bahmanis. Historian R. Subramanyam hence concludes that Hamvira defeated the Vijayanagara forces in a pitched battle but failed to break the stout defences of Hampi and retreated.

In 1460, Kapilendra Deva's lieutenant Tumma Bhupala conquered the Udaigiri fort from the Vijayanagara Empire. With Udaigiri as a base, Hamvira helped his father to conquer the coastal districts of the Vijayanagara Empire up to Tanjore and South Arcot.

=== Telangana ===
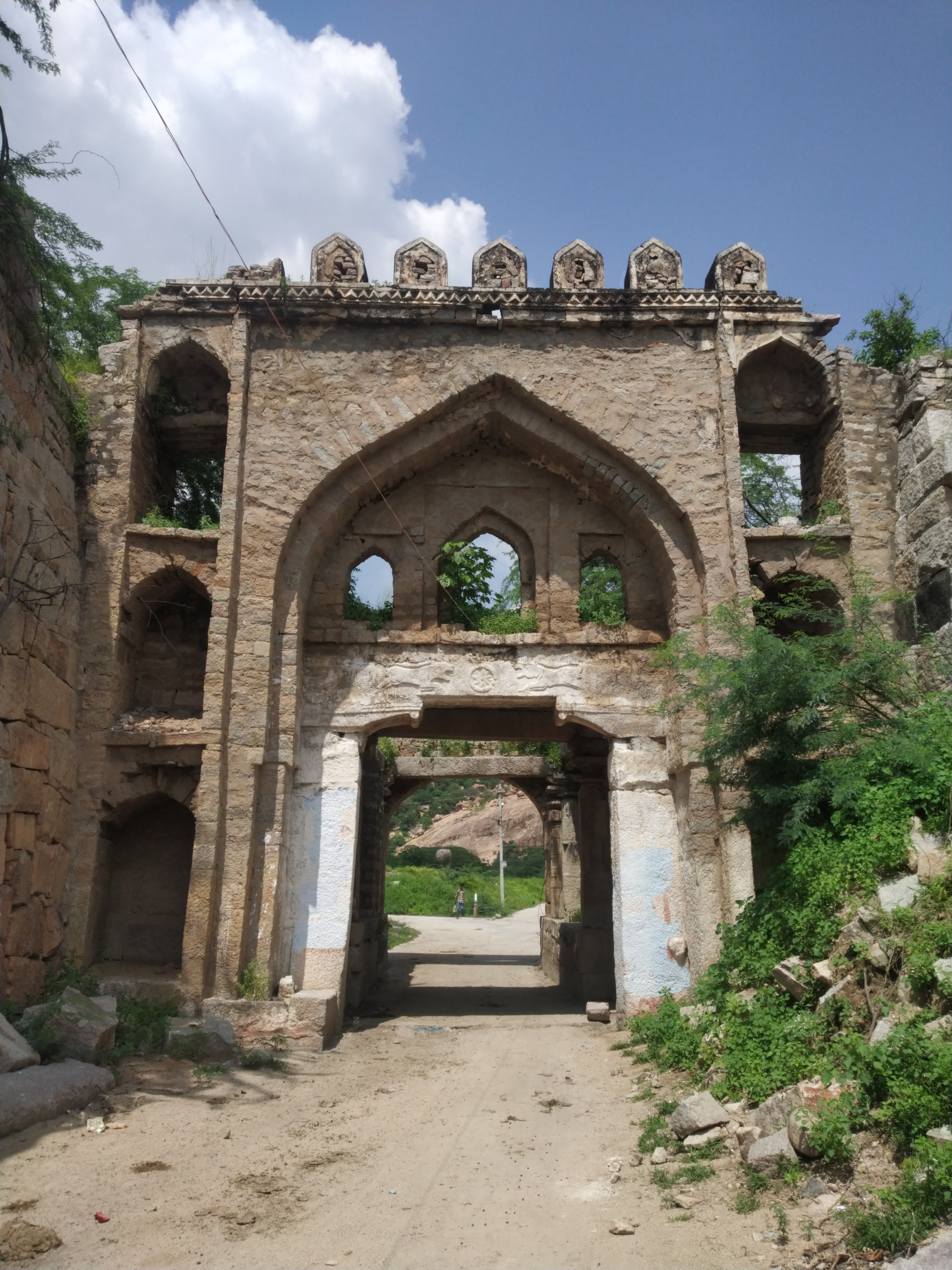
Present day ruins of Devarakonda Fort.

The Velama chief of Devarakonda (in the present-day Telangana region), Gajaravo Tippa, requested Kapilendra Deva for help against the Bahmani Sultanate. The Velama chiefs of Telangana had angered the Bahmanis by supporting Vijayanagar, their archenemy, in a war against them and the Bahmanis severely devastated the Velama territory.

In 1458, a battle ensued at Devarakonda in which Hamvira Deva defeated the Bahmani forces under Sanjar Khan, the general of Sultan Humayun Shah. Subsequently, he took control of the Khammam Fort and placed the governor of Rajahmundry and his cousin, Raghudeva Narendra Mohapatra in its charge.

He attacked Warangal Fort under the command of Mahmud Gawan, the Bahmani prime minister and conquered it after a siege lasting until February 1460.

== Struggle for the throne ==
Being the most able among Kapilendra Deva's numerous children, he was supported by the ministers, courtiers and some Gajapati vassals, as known from the "Abhinava-Gita-Govinda".

However, he was bypassed in the succession order in favour of his younger half-brother Purushottama Deva. This reason for this decision of making a younger and unproven prince the successor made by his father Kapilendra Deva is debated. Scholars theorize that Hamvira rebelled against his father, hence Purushotamma became his favourite son and was appointed as successor by his father Kapilendra Deva on the banks of the Krishna River. R. Subramanyam theorizes that during the last years of Kapilendra's reign a revolt led by his son Hamvira occurred in the Krishna River region. Kapilendra came to the banks of the Krishna River to quell the rebellion but his failing health prevented him from doing so. Before dying, he appointed Purushotamma as his successor.

There is a legend that when, under divine guidance, Kapilendra Deva announced that he was naming Purushottama as heir apparent, the eighteen older sons, including Hamvira Deva, threw spears at Purushottama in their fury, all of which missed.

Dissatisfied with Purushottama becoming emperor, he declared himself king, ruling from the Udaigiri Fort. Saluva Narasimha Deva Raya, emperor of the Vijayanagara Empire, took advantage of the Gajapati civil war and invaded Udaigiri around 1469. Hamvira was forced to sue for peace and was captured.

== Reign ==
Due to his weak position after his defeat by Saluva Narasimha Deva Raya, he sought and acquired the support of the Bahmani Sultanate in 1470. Muhammad Shah III's general Malik Hussain Bheiry (also known as Nizam-ul-Mulk) helped Hamvira in capturing Kondapalli and Rajahmundry. Then their combined forces marched to the Gajapati capital, Cuttack, defeated Purushottama in 1472 and Hamvira was crowned as the new king. In return for his aid, Hamvira ceded Rajahmundry and Kondavidu to Muhammad Shah III. Purushottama Deva re-captured the throne from Hamvira in 1476 due to the Bahmanis being unable to provide support.

Many scholars such as R.D. Banerjee do not agree with this theory of Hamvira achieving kingship proposed by R Subrahmanyam. Historian K.C. Panigrahi among others argues that if Hamvira had occupied the throne for even a short period, some evidence in the form of inscriptions or traditions would have been available.

== Later life ==
Not much is known about his later life. K.C. Panigrahi contemplates that he was likely to have been executed by the Bahmani Sultan when his secret correspondence with his brother Purushottama Deva was discovered. He states that Hamvira's able son, Kumara Kapileshwara Mahapatra, might have died during a battle.

R. Subrahmanyam is of the opinion that Purushottama Deva and Hamvira reached a compromise. When Hamvira was defeated in 1476, he was allowed to go to Khimidi where he ruled as a vassal of Purushottama Deva and established a line of vassal rulers.
