= Gangamma Temple, Dhenuvakonda =

Goddess Gangamma Temple

Religion
- Affiliation: Hinduism
- District: Prakasam
- Deity: Gangamma

Location
- Location: Addanki Mandal
- State: Andhra Pradesh
- Country: India
- Interactive map of Goddess Gangamma Temple
- Coordinates: 15.70209°N 79.95614°E

Architecture
- Elevation: 32 m (105 ft)

Goddess Gangamma Temple is in the outskirts of Dhenuva Konda, Garlapadu village in Prakasam District of Andhra Pradesh, India. Sunday is preferable day to offer pooja in the temple.

Goddess Gangamma is a powerful figure to the Yadava community. They celebrate Jatara for her on the full moon in April. During Jatara, the temple is decorated with a huge set of lighting. Devotees visit and pray to the goddess for the whole day and night of that full moon day.

== Location ==
Goddess Gangamma Temple is 1.5 km from Dhenuva Konda village and 1 km from Garlapadu village (new).

There is a temple for the God Nagavendrudu, which is situated just beside this temple.

Goddess Kanaka Durga temple has been constructed on the middle of the hill. Devotees have to take a ghat road to the temple for about one kilometer.
