= Dhenuva Konda =

- village
- Interactive map of Dhenuva Konda
- Location in Andhra Pradesh, India Dhenuva Konda (India)
- Coordinates: 15.711505°N 79.937553°E
- Country: India
- State: Andhra Pradesh
- District: Prakasam
- Mandal: Addanki
- Elevation: 32 m (105 ft)

Languages
  - Official: Telugu
- Time zone: UTC+5:30 (IST)
- PIN: 523 263
- Telephone code: 8593
- Lok Sabha constituency: Bapatla
- Vidhan Sabha constituency: Addanki

Dhenuva Konda is a village in Addanki mandal of Prakasam district in the Indian state of Andhra Pradesh.

== Geography ==
Dhenuva Konda (literally "Cow Hill") is located near to the bank of Gundlakamma river. Dhenuva Konda is surrounded by hills on three sides and wet fields on the north side. In the village there is fertile lands in north, east and part of west sides and dry lands are on south side. Most of the village land had been acquired to construct Kandula Obul Reddy Gundlakamma reservoir.

Denuvakonda rehabilitation colony given between Addanki and Medarmetla . some of Land owners chooses rehabilitation colony near between denuvakonda old village and Dodavaram.
