= Battle of Devarakonda =

Battle of Devarkonda

Battle of Devarkonda
- Part of Bahmani-Gajapati conflicts
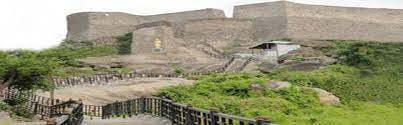
- Fort of Khammam captured by Hamvira Deva in Battle of Devarkonda (1458)
Date	1458 A.D.
Location	Devarkonda, Telangana, India 16.700°N 78.933°E
Result	Gajapati victory
Territorial changes	Hamvira conquered Warangal; Devarkonda became a feudal state of Gajapati Empire; Khammam fort captured by Gajapatis

Belligerents
Gajapati Empire: Velama chief; Bahmani rebels	Bahmani sultanate

Commanders and leaders
Kapilendra Deva; Hamvira Deva	Humayun Shah; Sanjar Khan

Strength
Unknown (consisting of a massive elephant corps)	50,000-70,000+ (100,000+ including camp followers); 40-100 elephants

Casualties and losses
Unknown	6,000–7,000+ horsemen killed The infantry and camp followers suffered near-total annihilation (50,000-80,000+ killed)

The Battle of Devarkonda took place between Gajapati Empire and Bahmani Sultanate in 1458 A.D. at Devarkonda, Telangana, India. In this battle Odia forces led by prince Hamvira Deva under king Gajapati Kapilendra Deva crushed a massive army of Bahmani Muslim forces led by Humayun Shah. The battle ended with Odia victory and thus Devarkonda became a vassal state of Gajapati Empire.

== Battle ==
The Velama chief of Devarakonda (in the present-day Telangana region), Gajaravo Tippa, requested Kapilendra Deva for help against the Bahmani Sultanate. The Velama chiefs of Telangana had angered the Bahmanis by supporting Vijayanagar, their archenemy, in a war against them and the Bahmanis severely devastated the Velama territory.

“From greed of gain and for the defence of paganism, thought himself bound to assist the infidels of that fortress; so he sent a countless force with a hundred elephants to the assistance of the defenders of the fortress.”

— Tabātāba

In 1458, a battle ensued at Devarakonda in which the Orissan army advanced upon them, while the Velamas launched an attack from within the fort. Trapped between these two forces, the Bahmani army suffered a crushing defeat. Their baggage, elephants, and horses were seized as spoils. The Bahmani forces were chased for a distance of approximately three jarsakhs, with nearly 6,000 to 7,000 cavalry soldiers killed. Many others succumbed to thirst while crossing the arid deserts. Subsequently, he took control of the Khammam Fort and placed the governor of Rajahmundry and his cousin, Raghudeva Narendra Mohapatra, in charge.

== Aftermath ==
As a result of this battle Gajapati forces came out as victorious and Telangana region became a feudal state of the Gajapati empire with the Velama chiefs as the vassal rulers. The victory over the Bahmani Sultanate forces at Devarakonda in 1458 CE enabled Kapilendra Deva to assume the title of Kalavargeśvara which meant the Lord of Kalaburagi. In 1460, an inscription at Warangal fort tells of Hamivradeva Kumara Mahapatra capturing it, being Kapilesvara Maharaya's son.

Kapilendra ruled most of Telangana. He knew the Bahmanis wouldn't accept losing territory and wanted to weaken them forever. According to Firishta, this battle happened around 1459. The Bahmanis didn't try to take Telangana while Kapilendra lived. Muslim historians had to explain why the Bahmani army was defeated and why Humayun Shah failed to restore its honor. Humayun Shah died in 1461. His eight-year-old son Nizam Shah succeeded him, ruling from 1461 to 1463.

== See also ==
- Gajapati Empire
- Vijayanagara Empire
- Kapilendra Deva
- Deva Raya II
- Bahamani Sultanate

== Sources ==
- Subrahmanyam, R, ed. (1957). The Sūryavaṁśi Gajapatis of Orissa. Waltair: Andhra University. OCLC 613268261.
