= Dvipada Bhagavatamu =

- Author: Madiki Singana
- Original title: ద్విపదభాగవతము
- Language: Telugu
- Subject: Bhagavata Purana
- Genre: Epic poem
- Publisher: Saraswathi Mahal Library, Thanjavur.
- Publication date: 1950
- Publication place: India
- Pages: 220

Dvipada Bhagavatamu (Telugu: ద్విపదభాగవతము) is an epic poem in Dvipada format written by Madiki Singana. This Telugu version of Bhagavata Purana, described the life of Hindu God Krishna. The author Madiki Singanaraya lived in the early part of the fifteenth century.

This work is anterior to Potana's work and his verses are cited as models in standard works on Grammar and Rhetoric. The author has also written three other works in Telugu namely: Vasishta Ramayana, Padma Purana and Sakala-nīti-sammatamu.

This work has three Kandas in it:-(1) Madura Kanda (2) Kalyana Kanda and (3) Jagadhabiraksha Kanda. The other Kandas dealing with the Balaleela and the Bhaktanugraha are missing. It is published in 1950 by Saraswathi Mahal Library, Tanjavur and edited by Alladi Mahadeva Sastry.
