= Kondapalli Fort =

Fort in Andhra Pradesh, India

- Part of Reddi Kingdom
- Kondapalli, Vijayawada, Andhra Pradesh, India
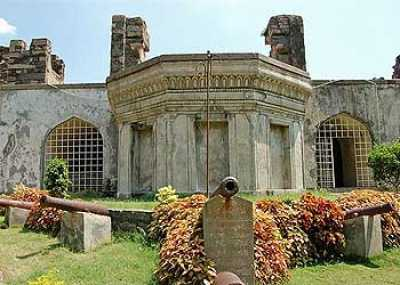
- Palace view at Kondapalli Kota or Fort

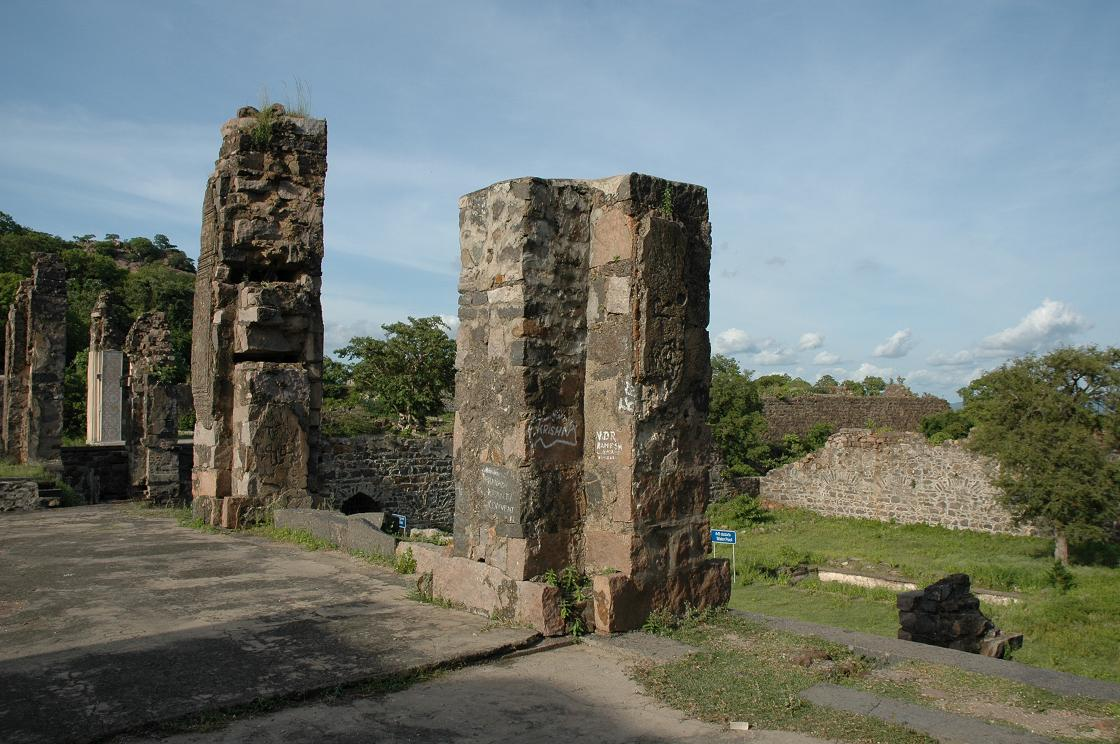
- Forecourt of the fort

Site information
- Type: Fort
- Controlled by: Government of Andhra Pradesh
- Condition: Reconstructed

Location
- Location within Andhra Pradesh
- Coordinates: 16.625283°N 80.530667°E

Site history
- Built: 14th century CE
- Built by: Prolaya Vema Reddy
- Materials: Granite Stones and lime mortar
- Battles/wars: Reddi Kingdom, Gajapati Kingdom of Odisha, Qutubshahi dynasty, Vijayanagara Empire, Sultans of Golconda (Nizams) and the British
- Events: 16th century Kondapally pedda Bailu or Plains Ply Ground Of Battles between Vellanki Rajas of Rayudu and Bahamanis of Golconda with the support of Paritrala Jupally Chieftains

Garrison information
- Occupants: Abandoned

Kondapalli Fort, also locally known as Kondapalli Kota and Kondapalli Quilla, lies to the west of Kondapalli in Ibrahimpatnam mandal of NTR district in Andhra Pradesh, India was built by Prolaya Vema Reddy of Reddi Kingdom during the 14th century CE. It was initially built as a leisure place and business center and later served as a military training base for the British rulers. According to some other historians it was built in 1360 CE by Anna Vema Reddy after he captured Kondapalli from Mudigonda Chalukyas, the fort has been home to several dynasties, from the Reddi rulers Gajapati dynasty to the Nizam Nawabs, and then the East India Company.

== Geography ==
The fort is located to the west of Vijayawada city in the main hill range known as Kondapalli in the Krishna district. The hill range, about 24 kilometres (15 mi) in length, extends between Nandigama and Vijayawada. The forest area in this hill range abounds in a type of lightwood known as 'ponuku' పొనుకు కఱ్ఱ (Gyrocapus jacquini), which is used exclusively for the manufacture of the famous Kondpalli toys. The forest vegetation around Kondapalli fort and the nearby hills are also well known for medicinal plants and trees such as Phyllanthus amarus (Telugu local name "nela usiri" నేల ఉసిరిక చెట్టు), Phyllanthus, Andrographis paniculata (local name: "adavi mirapa" అడవి మిరప or "nelavemu" నేలవేము), Thedlapala (Wrightia tinctoria), Tephrosia purpurea, Albizia amara, Streulia urens and Chloroxylon swetenia. The hill range is mainly made up of charnockites, with some pyroxene granulites, granites, khondalites, pyroxenites and dolerites.

== History ==
The fort was built in 1360 CE by Anna Vemareddy of the Kondaveedu Reddy dynasty after he captured Kondapalli from Mudigonda Chalaukyas. Then the fort was conquered by the mighty Gajapati dynasty of Odisha. In the historic struggle for power for the throne of Gajapati dynasty, Hamvira Deva had to fight his brother Purushottama Deva, who had succeeded to the throne after their father's death. He sought the help of the Bahmani Sultan in this war. He was successful in defeating his brother and occupied the throne of Gajapati dynasty, in 1472. But in the bargain, he gave Kondapalli and Rajahmundry to the Bahmani Sultan. Subsequently,Purushottama Deva defeated Hamvira in 1476 and occupied the throne of Gajapati. But it is also said that in 1476, a revolution began at Kondapalli when there was famine in the Bahmani kingdom. The garrison of Kondapalli revolted and gave possession of the fort to "Hamer Oriya" or Hamvira.

Purushottama Deva once he became the king, tried to get back Kondapalli and Rajahmundry from the Bahmani Sultan III. But when he held siege over Rajamundry, for some unknown reason he signed a peace treaty with the Sultan, which resulted in souring of relations between Bahmani and Vijayanagar rulers, which resulted in minor battles. But in 1481, after the death of Sultan Mahammad, the Bahmani Sultanate was in disarray and taking advantage of this situation Purushottam fought with Mahmad Shah, the Sultan's son, and took control of Rajahmundry and Kondapalli fort. Gajapati Purushottam Deva died in 1497 and was succeeded by his son Gajapati Prataprudra Deva.

In 1509, Gajapati Prataprudra Deva started a war against Krishnadevaraya of Vijayanagar Empire, but Gajapati had to retreat to the north to defend an attack by Sultan Allauddin Hussan Shah of Bengal. The consequence was that Krishnadevaraya had an easy victory over Kondapalli, which he occupied in June 1515. In the last war fought in 1519, Krishnadevaraya once again defeated the Gajapati ruler. Since the Kondaveedu fortress was very strong, after three months siege of the fort, Krishnadevaraya had to personally direct the operations to get control of the fort. Following this war, Krishnadevaraya married Gajapati Prataprudra Deva's daughter, Kalinga Kumari Jaganmohini. A treaty was also signed for restoring all land up to the southern boundary of the Krishna River to Orissa, which included Kondapalli.

But after the treaty with Vijayanagara emperor, between 1519 and 1525, Gajapati Prataprudra Deva had to defend his territory against invasion by Sultan Quli Qutab, the Sultan of Golkonda. But in the final assault, in 1531, Kondapalli came under the rule of Sultan of Golkonda. The war with Golkonda Sultans was continued by Govinda Bidyadhar, the new ruler of the Gajapati Kingdom who had succeeded Gajapati Prataprudra Deva (who died in 1533) but ended finally with a treaty with the Sultan.

The area came under Mughal rule in the 17th century. After the disintegration of the Mughal Empire in the early 18th century, Nizam ul-Mulk, what later became the Nizam of Hyderabad declared independence and took the area under its control. In the late 18th century, the area was still under the Nizam's rule, a treaty of alliance was signed between Nizam Ali and the British East India Company recognizing the control of the British over the territory. This treaty was initially signed on 12 November 1766 under which the company in return for the grant of the territory agreed to garrison troops in the fort for Nizam's aid at an annual cost of 90,000 pounds. It is also stated that in 1766 the British, under General Caillaud, stormed the fort and took control of it.

A second treaty was signed on 1 March 1768, under which the Nizam recognized the grant provided to the British by Mughal ruler Shah Alam. But, as a gesture of friendship, the British (then the East India Company) agreed to pay an allowance of 50,000 pounds to the Nizam. However, in 1823, the East India Company rested total control of the Sarcars under an outright purchase from the Nizam.

In the initial years, the fort was used as a business center but after the British took over the fort in 1766 it was converted into a military training base.

== Structure ==
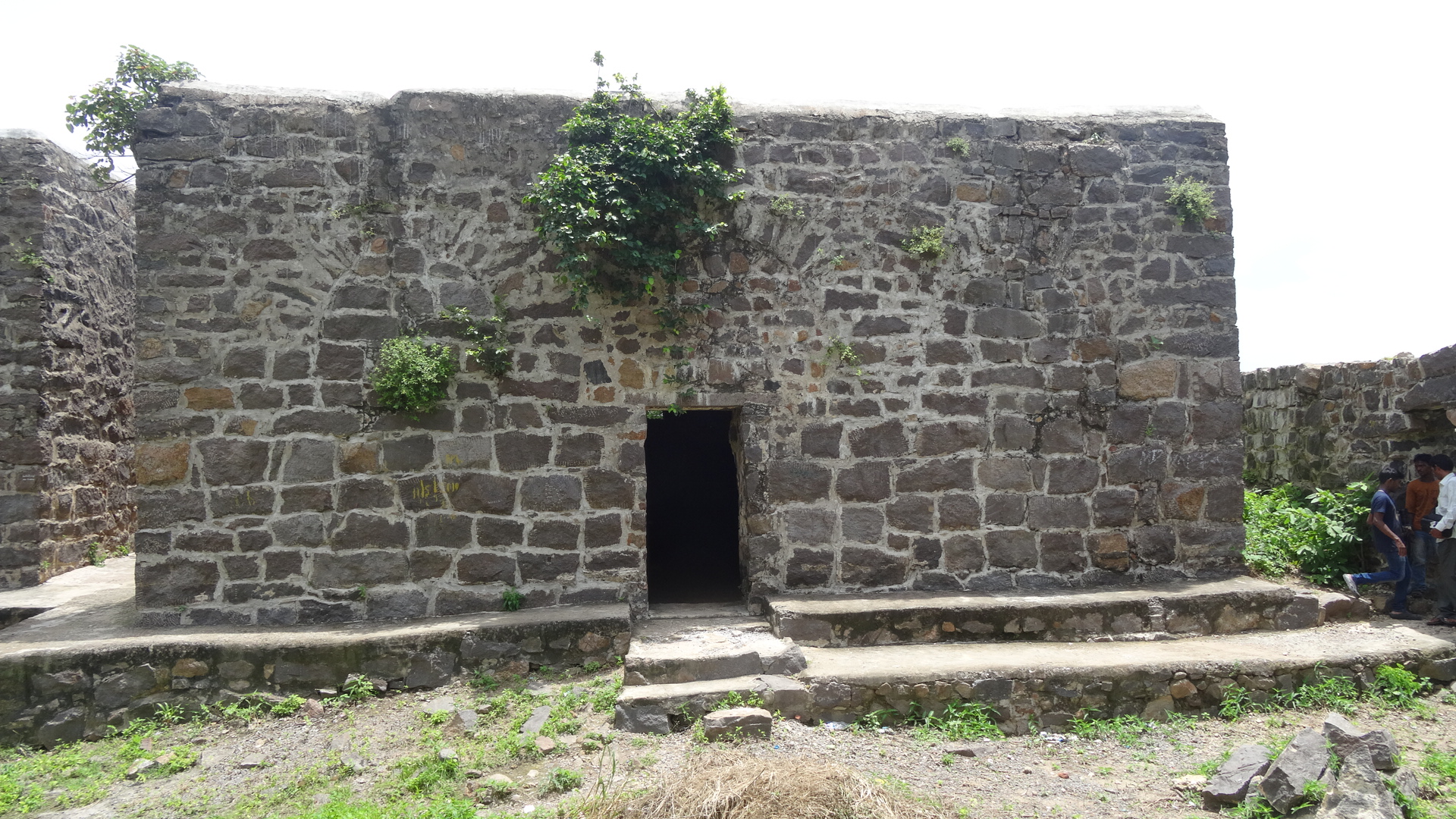
Royal prison at Kondapalli Fort

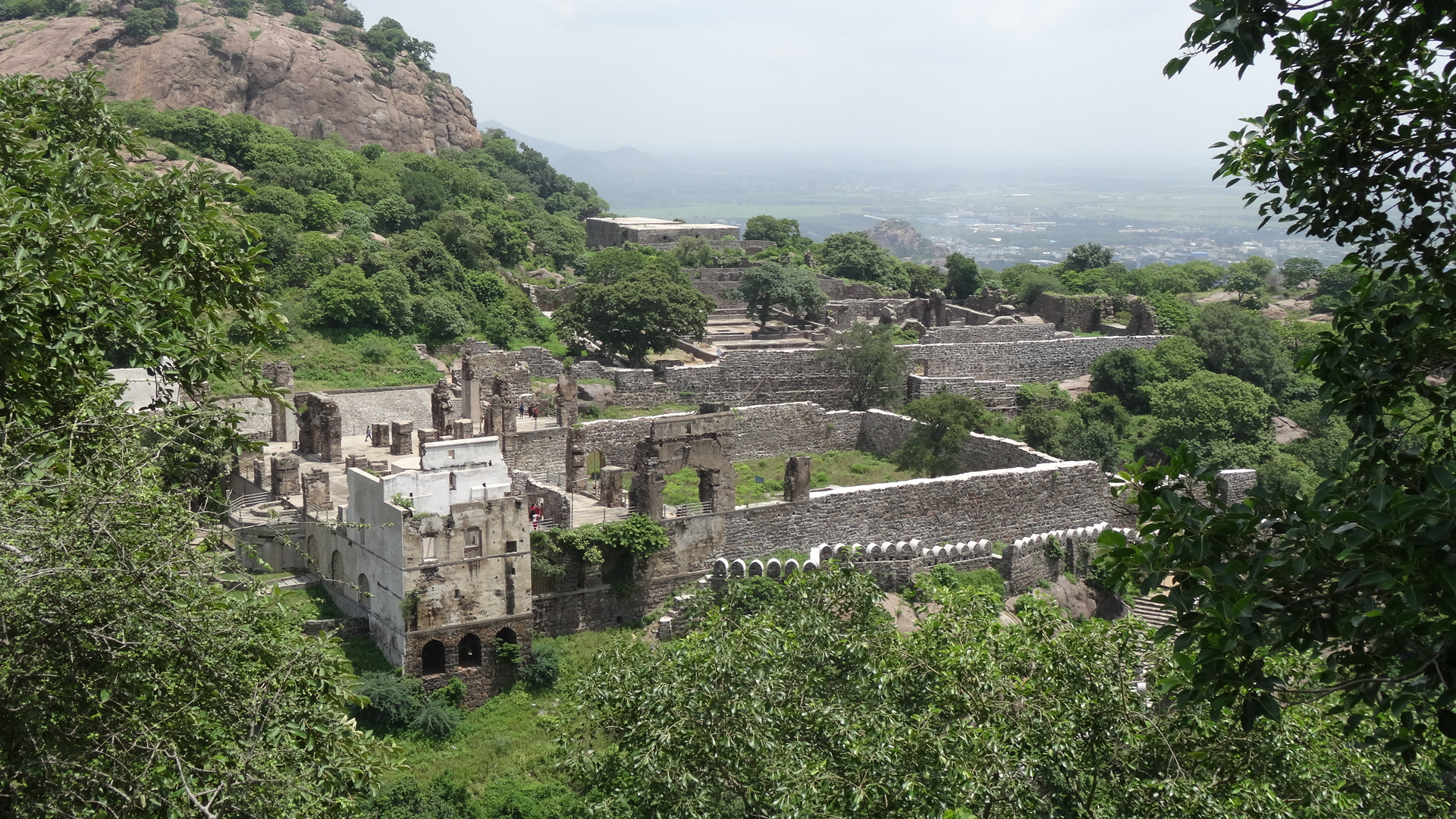
Aerial view of Kondapalli Fort

The fort, which has a very picturesque sight, has three successive entry gates. The main entrance gate is called the ‘Dargha Darwaja’ built with single block of granite. It is 12 feet (3.7 m) wide and 15 feet (4.6 m) high. Its name is derived from the tomb or dargha of Gulab Shah, who was killed in battle here. Besides Darhgha Darwaza, another entrance gate called the Golconda Darwaza is located on the other end of the hill, which leads to Jaggaiahpet village. The fortified wall has towers and battlements.

At the far end of the fort there is the Tanisha Mahal or Palace, perched on a crest between two hills. The palace had many chambers on the ground floor and a huge hall on the upper floor. In addition, there are several buildings still standing in the fort, which are ruins.

There is deep reservoir near the palace, which is sourced by a spring. The water in the reservoir is said to be very cold and to cause fever. There are numerous other water tanks in the fort area, which go dry during the summer months. An old granary now in ruins, beyond the reservoir, is inhabited by bats.

An English barrack is still standing in the fort area, which has eight large rooms, apart from a house in an annex. An English cemetery is also seen in the fort.

== Restoration works ==
The Archeological Department of Andhra Pradesh has undertaken restoration and renovation works of the fort and the structures located within its precincts. The works cover improving link road to the fort from the National Highway, strengthening and restoring of historical walls, restoration of Jail Khana (prison house), Koneru pond and Museum, building a ropeway up to the hill, construction of inner roads, providing basic amenities such as three-phase power supply, drinking water and toilets, landscaping and setting up food courts. The museum contains relics found at that place along with display of Kondapalli Toys and lot of Historical references. An advanced projection mapping with graphic, animation, and laser displays is used to tell the history of fort, utilising the irregular landscapes, ruins, and buildings present in the fort as a screen. It was launched in 2019.
