= Addanki revenue division =

Revenue division in Andhra Pradesh, India

- revenue division in Prakasam district
- Country: India
- State: Andhra Pradesh
- District: Prakasam
- Formed: 31 December 2025
- Founder: Government of Andhra Pradesh
- Headquarters: Addanki
- Time zone: UTC+05:30 (IST)

Addanki revenue division is an administrative division in the Prakasam district of the Indian state of Andhra Pradesh. It is one of the three revenue divisions in the district and comprises ten mandals. The division was formed on 31 December 2025 as part of the district consolidation and administrative reorganisation undertaken by the Government of Andhra Pradesh during the 2025 restructuring of districts.

== Administration ==
Addanki is the administrative headquarters of the division. There are 10 mandals in Addanki revenue division:

| Sl. No | Mandal name |
|---|---|
| 1 | Darsi |
| 2 | Donakonda |
| 3 | Thallur |
| 4 | Mundlamuru |
| 5 | Santhamaguluru |
| 6 | Kurichedu |
| 7 | Ballikurava |
| 8 | Addanki |
| 9 | J. Panguluru |
| 10 | Korisapadu |

== See also ==
- List of revenue divisions in Andhra Pradesh
- List of mandals in Andhra Pradesh
