= Purushottama Deva =

Gajapati Emperor from 1467 to 1497

- Gajapati
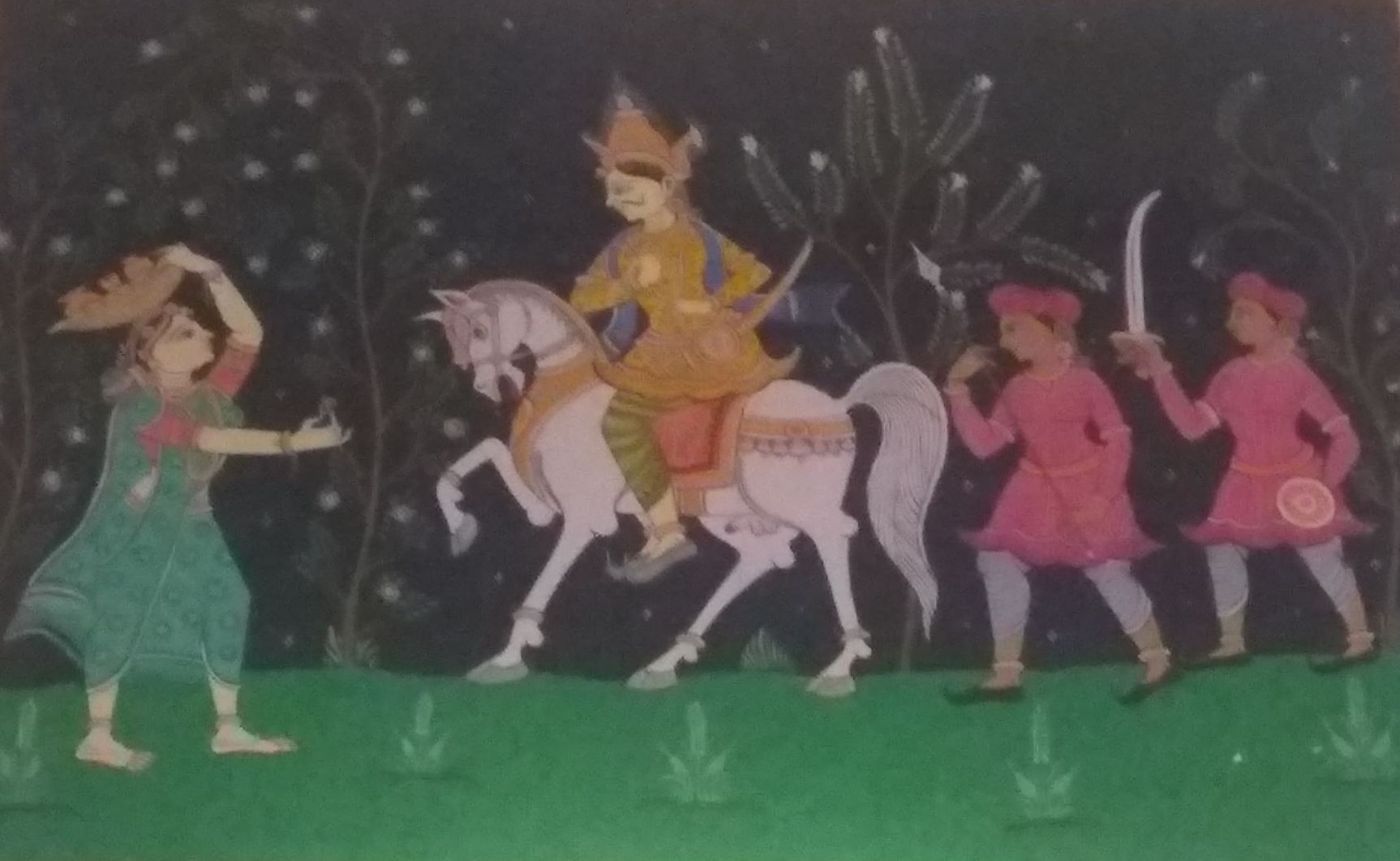
- Gajapati Purushottam Deva depicted according to the Odia folklore of Kanchi Abhijaan and Manika, in the traditional wall painting of the Jagannath temple

2nd Gajapati Emperor
- 1st reign: 1467 – October 1472
- Predecessor: Kapilendra Deva
- Successor: Hamvira Deva
- 2nd reign: 1476 – 1497
- Predecessor: Hamvira Deva
- Successor: Prataprudra Deva
- Died: 1497 CE; Kataka, Kalinga (modern day Cuttack, Odisha)
- Spouse: Padmavati
- Issue: Prataprudra Deva
- House: Suryavamsha
- Father: Kapilendra Deva
- Mother: Parvati Devi
- Religion: Hinduism

Vira Pratapa Purushottama Deva (Odia: ବୀରପ୍ରତାପ ପୁରୁଷୋତ୍ତମ ଦେବ) was the second ruler from the Suryavamsa Gajapati dynasty. His father Gajapati Kapilendra Deva chose him as his heir to rule the Gajapati Kingdom at the banks of river Krishna where he died. This decision infuriated his elder brother Hamvira Deva who was a battle hardened and successful warrior fulfilling the task of conquering the southern territories and expeditions against the Vijayanagara Empire as wished by his father.

There is a legend that when, under divine guidance, Kapilendra Deva announced that he was naming Purushottama as heir apparent, the eighteen older sons in anger threw spears at Purushottama, all of which missed. Purushottama Deva is also the lead character of the legend of Kanchi Kaveri Upakhyana (poem) written by the poet Purushottama Dasa in sixteenth century and later adapted to Bengali by the Bengali poet Rangalal Bandyopadhyay. This legend is also popular among the Hindu devotees of the Jagannath worship tradition of Odisha.

== Military achievements and territorial expansions ==
Crown Prince Hamvira Deva, the eldest son of Emperor Kapilendra Deva revolted against Purushottama as the latter ascended the imperial throne. Purushottama had a militarily advantageous fortification in Cuttack's Barabati fort, which in turn was protected by a string of other extensive fortifications and camps of the Gajapati forces. To make matters worse, Saluva Narasimha of Vijayanagara had attacked and seized portions of the Gajapati Empire like Kondapalli and Rajamahendravaram amidst this internal conflict of the ruling family.

=== Conflict with Hamvira Deva and Bahmani Sultanate (1467–1472 CE) ===
A disgruntled Hamvira Deva solicited a treaty with the Turko-Persian Bahmani Sultan Muhammad Shah III Lashkari. Willing to capture Rajamahendravaram and Kondapalli, Muhammad Shah III placed conditions on Hamvira to accept his suzerainty when he becomes the ruler of the Gajapati realm and cede the desired territories from his father's empire. This deal between Hamvira and Muhammad Shah III has been mentioned in the works of Firishta and Sayyid Ali Taba Taba. The Bahmani Sultan sent his commander Hussain Bheiry with troops to support Hamvira in overthrowing Purushottama. Gaining the support of the Bahmani forces, Hamvira Deva declared himself Gajapati in the year 1472. Purushottama lost more than half of his father's empire in the initial years to Hamvira and the Bahmani forces. Hamvira became a doppelgänger Gajapati in the southern portions of Odisha and tried to invade the Gajapati capital ruled by his younger brother but was defeated.

=== Retrieval of lost territories from Bahmanis in 1476–1484 CE ===
Hamvira had ceded Rajamahendravaram and Kondapalii to the Bahmani Sultanate for which commander Hussain Bheiry, was appointed as the governor and Hamvira ruled as a vassal king under them. In 1476, Bahmani sultanate weakened due to internal conflicts and a severe famine. Using this situation as a perfect opportunity, Purushottama Deva launched an offensive from the north and defeated his elder brother Hamvira, expelled the Bahmani garrisons and restored Rajamahendravaram and Kondapalli to his empire. Ferishta writes that due to the severe mismanagement amidst famine in the regions of Telangana until Rajamahendravaram by the Bahmanis, Saluva Narasimha of Vijayanagara had aided some internal rebellions. Sayid AliTaba Taba writes that when Purushottama's forces arrived in the region, the garrison at Kondavidu fort rebelled and killed their general before making Hamvira in charge. Hamvira not only surrendered to his brother but also resolved to help him in his further expeditions.

In 1477, Purushottama invaded Bahmani territories and occupied Rajamundry without much opposition. Thus, Sultan Muhammad III marched against Purushottama himself and defeated him. Purushottama surrendered and sued for peace. Sultan demanded 25 elephants and Purushottama had to agree to this condition.

An inscription of Purushottama Deva dated to 1484 states that Azam Khan gifted the village of Mutukumalli located in the Vinukonda taluq of Guntur district to Purushottama on the occasion of a lunar eclipse. After dealing with the Bahamni forces and his rebellious elder brother, Purushottama turned his attention towards southern territories, which Saluva Narasimha of Vijayanagara Empire conquered amidst the internal conflict with his elder brother. He captured the Krishna-Godavari delta, parts of Telangana and expanded his march until Udayagiri fort where he imprisoned the Vijayanagara ruler.

=== War with Vijayanagara and hostilities by Saluva Narasimha Deva Raya ===
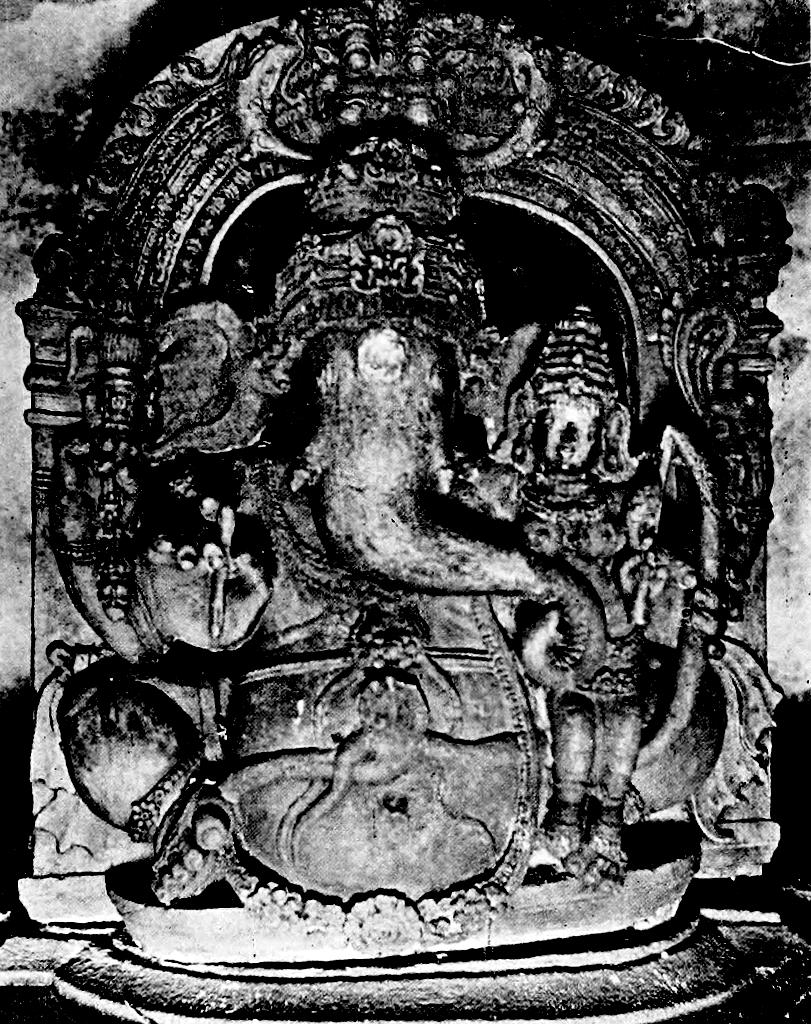
Jagannath temple's Uchhista or Kanchi Ganesha idol was brought by Gajapati Purushottama Deva as a victory trophy from his Kanchipuram expedition

While the civil war and conflict with the intervening Bahamanis were going on, the emperor of Vijayanagara, Saluva Narasimha Deva Raya, wanted to seize the opportunity for regaining the lost territories of the empire from the Gajapati. The Vijayanagar emperor declared war on the Gajapati in the year 1468 and attacked the southern fortified territories of Udayagiri and Chandragiri situated in and around today's Nellore district. In the initial attempt and as in corroboration with the legend of Kanchi-Kaveri expedition, the Gajapati forces lost their ground and were defeated while many of them losing their lives. Saluvabhuigayam, a Sanskrit literary work of the period records the exploits of emperor Saluva Narasimha against the Kalingas (Odisha Kingdom) while another reference is provided in the Varaha Purana that the General named Ishwara Nayaka captured the Udayagiri fort from the Gajapati forces stationed there on behalf of the Vijayanagara Emperor. The Turko-Persian Bahamanis had equally captured the southern parts of the Gajapati Empire named as Rajamahendravaram and Kondavidu during the ongoing Gajapati civil war. The Persian Muslim chronicle Burhan-i-Ma'sir states that the Narasimha Deva Raya advanced north with an army of 700,000 "cursed" infantry, 8,500 elephants like mountains of iron to capture Rajmahendry.

After the defeat of the Bahamanis, the surrender of Hamvira Deva and the recapture of Rajamahendravaram and Kondavidu forts, Purushottama Deva launched an attack on the southern regions to recapture the lost territories. It is comparable to the Kanchi Kaveri legend that the Gajapati actually failed to make much headway at the first attempt but in the second attempt he not only attacked Kanchi, the secondary capital of Vijayanagara Empire, but also imprisoned Saluva Narasimha Deva. The Vijayanagara Emperor was freed in only the exchange of Udayagiri and Chandragiri regions back to Gajapati and the marital alliance with the Gajapatis ensuring no further invasions from the Vijayanagar monarchy. While his return from the final Kanchi expedition, Gajapati Purushottama Deva brought idols of deities Uchchhishta Ganapati and Gopala that are now installed inside the Jagannath temple premises along with idols of goddesses like Tarini, Karunei and Barunei as symbols of his victory.

==== The Legend of Kanchi-Kaveri expedition ====
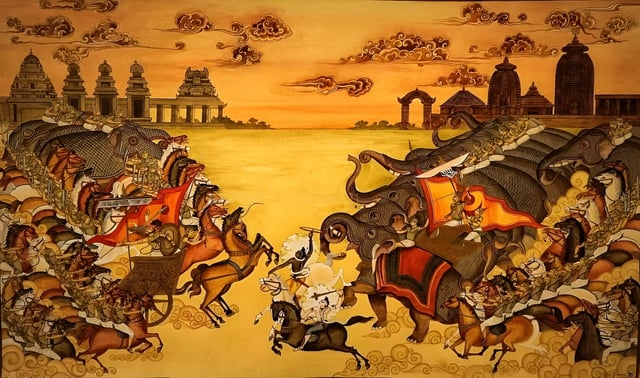
Gajapati-Vijayanagara war according to the legend of Kanchi-Kaveri.

Purushottama Deva's war in the south with Vijayanagara ruler Saluva Narasimha Deva Raya is immortalized through the legend of Kanchi – Kaveri Upakhyan in the Jagannath spiritual cult of Odisha. According to the legend, Saluva Narasimha (also identified as Kalabargeswara) had sent emissaries to Odisha on the interest from Purushottama Deva to marry his daughter Padmavati. The emissaries had arrived on the auspicious day of Rath Yatra festival of lord Jagannath and witnessed Purushottama Deva performing the sweeping ceremony on the chariot of the lord with a golden broomstick. Odisha's kings were known as Routa and Routaraya, which meant servant of and servant king in service of the lord Jagannath. The ritual of Chera Pahara or sweeping the lord's chariot on the auspicious occasion of Rath Yatra was a symbolic representation of the position of Odishan kings as the deputy of the lord who was declared as the real ruler of the empire. Infuriated by this act of sweeping beyond his understanding as reported by the emissaries, Saluva Narasimha sent a message that he would never give his daughter in marriage to a sweeper. This not only was an insult to Purushottama Deva but also the deity Jagannath of Odisha.

Enraged by this insult, Purushottama invaded southern territories of Kanchi and Kaveri River's adjoining areas which were controlled by Saluva Narasimha. He was defeated and unsuccessful in the first attempt, returned disheartened as a broken man to his homeland Odisha and went straight to the Puri temple. He prayed to the lord there asking for his divine assistance in breaking the enemy lines. As per the legend, Lord Jagannath assured him that he along with his brother Balabhadra would ride with his army in disguise when he makes the second attempt. In the second attempt Kanchi was captured, Saluva Narasimha was defeated and his daughter Padmavati was brought as a prisoner. The legend further says that the gods Jagannath and Balarama walk ahead of the army. They ask a milk woman, Manika, for food and Jagannath gives his ring in pledge that Purushottama will pay for them. When Purushottama meets Manika, he rejoices that the gods go before him and honors her with the village Manika Patana. Blessed by the gods, he defeats Saluva Narasimha, conquers Kanchi and takes captive Princess Padmavati along with a statue of Ganesha and Gopala. Purushottama commands his prime minister to give the princess in marriage to a perfect sweeper. The king, who had declared his oath in public, has to deliver on it even if he still loves her. The prime minister delays finding the perfect sweeper, feeling sorry for the princess as he struggles for an idea to save her honour. The king, still in love with the princess, is tormented by her presence in the palace and haunted by his role in her misfortune. To ease his guilt and distance himself from her, he gives the prime minister a deadline to find a sweeper for her to marry. The princess has already decided to die by poison on the day she is married to a sweeper. On the next Ratha Yatra, Purushottama sweeps out one of the chariots with a golden broom, the clever Prime Minister announces he has found the perfect sweeper for the Princess and the emperor marries his new queen of the empire of Odisha. The public rejoices when they see their king marry his love even while fulfilling his oath. Everyone is happy.

== Constructive activities and cultural contribution ==
During Purushottama Deva's reign there was a flourishing of poetry with a number of works which were written by himself in Sanskrit. Gajapati Purushottam Deva was a scholar of Sanskrit literature and is attributed to have written many scriptures on his own during this time.

The individual works of Purushottam Deva include;

- Abhinava Gitagovinda
- Nama Malika
- Mukti Chintamani
- Abhinava Venisamhara
- Gopalapuja Paddhati
- Durgotsav
- Bishnu Bhakti Kaladruma
- Sanskrit Dictionary called Trikanda Kosha

It was during his rule that the writer of Sahitya Darpan, Biswanath Mohapatra found a place in his court. Gajapati Purushotama Deva after his conquest of Kanchi and divine experience of Lord Jagannath, constructed a temple at Deulagaon village near Raibania fort in Balasore district. In the temple, he installed two granite stone idols of lord Jagannath and Balarama as the siblings riding on horse and dressed for war. Until this day both the deities are worshiped there as a memory of his victory over Kanchi with divine intervention.

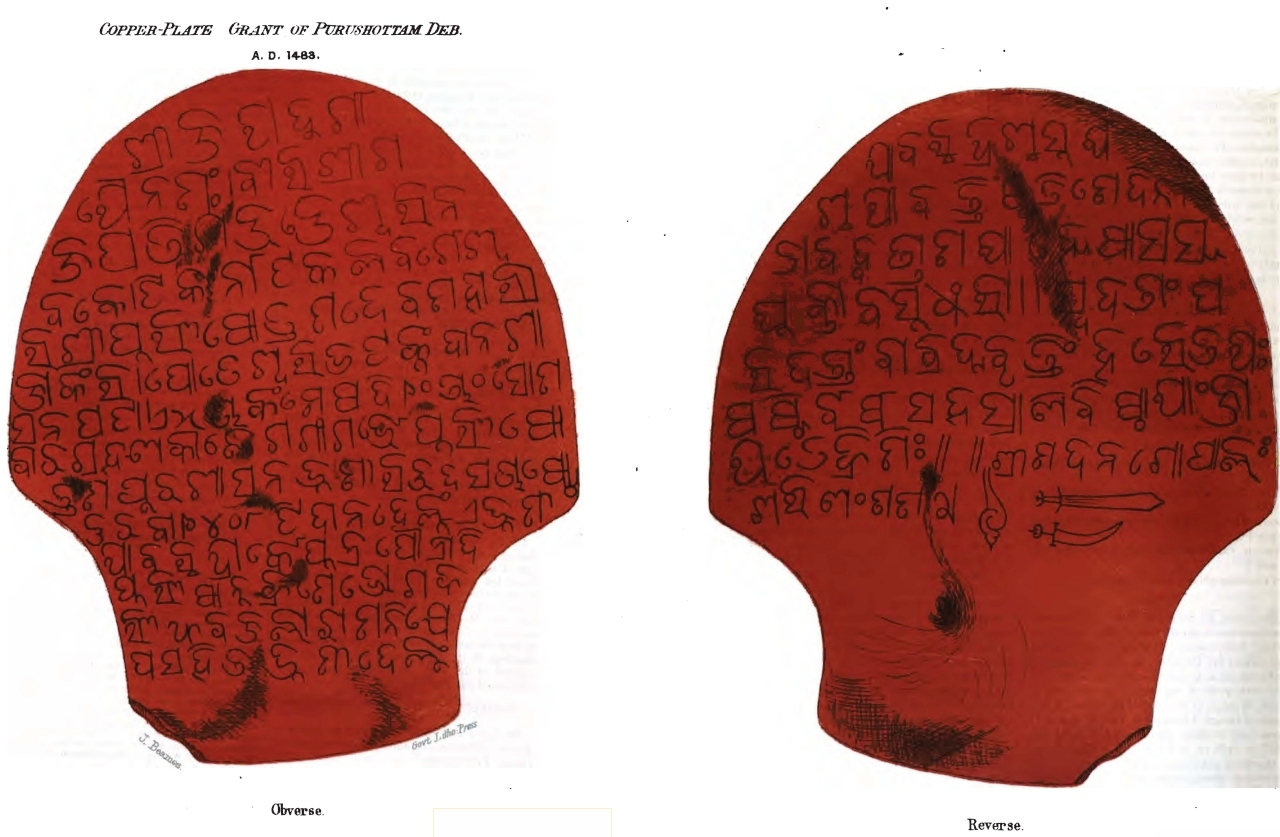
A facsimile of an inscription on a copper plate recording a land grant made by Rāja Purushottam Deb, king of Orissa, in the fifth year of his reign (1483).

Purushottama Deva established 16 Sasans (or local administration of Brahmins) on banks of river Mahanadi after his victory in war. Four of these existing villages of Elmapur, Patapur Sasan, Sriyapur Sasan and Satyabhamapur Sasan were donated to Brhamins by his four other queens Elma Devi, Patamahadevi, Sriyadevi and Satybhamadevi where lord Jagannath is still worshipped as deity Dadhibaman as a symbol of the victory. The idols of Uchistha or Kamada Ganesha and Gopala brought as trophy of victory over Kanchi by Purushottama Deva are now placed in the premises of Jagannath Temple at Puri. The Puri Jagannath temple's fortification walls like the inner wall Kurma Bedha and outer wall Meghanada Prachira were completed during the rule of Purusottama Deva though started by his father. The Gajapati encouraged folk dances presented as service to lord Jagannath at the temple. It is recorded that queen Padmavati received the Gopa Sandhi award for her services to lord Jagannath through her skilled dancing. The Nata Mandapa and Bhoga Mandapa were constructed in the Puri temple premises during the rule of Purushottama Deva. He also built the Sundara Madhava temple in Purushottampur of today's Ganjam district. The Gajapati also waved off marriage taxes from common people in the conquered territories of southern India that existed as an administrative norm before him.

Gajapati Purushottama Deva not only managed to regain most of the lost territories from his inherited empire but also conquered new territories in the southern regions of India. Despite the dispute with his rebellious elder brother, he managed to establish Odisha as a major power player in Deccan and Southern India while the Bahamani and Vijayanagar empires contested for supremacy with him. He pardoned his brother Hamvira Deva and let him rule as a representative and vassal of the Gajapati Empire in the southern territories. He did not face any threat from the northern Muslim ruled kingdoms like Bengal or Jaunpur unlike his father and successor Prataprudra Deva who would eventually struggle to keep the empire intact while dealing with Krishna Deva Raya of Vijayanagar, Muslim States of Deccan India and Bengal. His minimal attention to the northern frontier led to Turks like Sehjada and Mallick capture Bengal without any threat. Purushottama Deva established complete military control over a vast region comprising Bengali, Telugu, Carnatic and Tamil speaking people, other than Odias and contributed to the aversion of any Muslim dynasty's direct rule in south eastern coastal provinces and territories of India in the 16th Century. Though his initial life was spent in battles, he managed to encourage and contribute to literature, cultural activities and temple construction projects. The Madala Panji temple records of Jagannath Temple at Puri state that Purushottama Deva made a donation of 2000 Kahanas of cowries to the temple which shows his devotion to lord Jagannath.

Purushottama Deva Suryavamsa dynasty
Regnal titles
Preceded by Kapilendra Deva	Gajapati of Odisha; 1466–1497	Succeeded by Prataparudra Deva
