= Ramagiri Fort =

Fort in Peddapalli

- Peddapalli district, Telangana, India
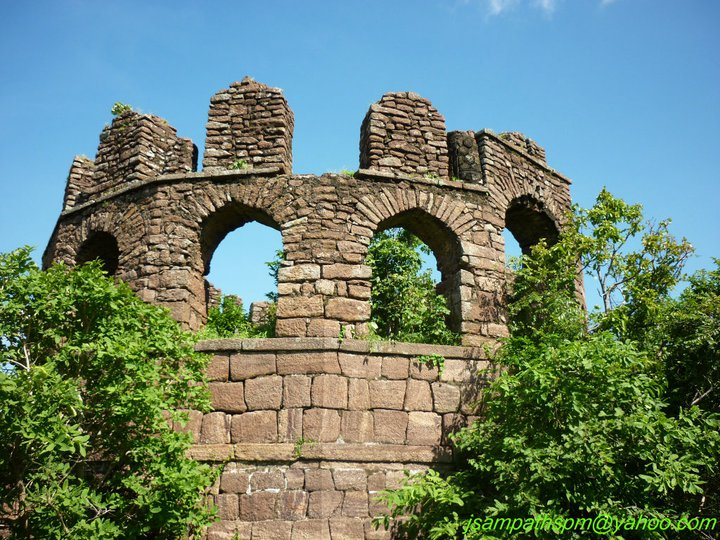
- View of Ramagiri Fort

Site information
- Type: Fort
- Open to the public: Yes
- Condition: Ruins

Location
- Ramagiri Fort
- Coordinates: 18.583°N 79.533°E

Site history
- Built: 12th century
- Built by: Kakatiyas
- Materials: Stone and mud

The Ramagiri Fort, also known as Ramagiri Khilla, located over a mountain top, is in the Peddapalli district of the Indian state of Telangana.

in ramagiri khilla the Hanuman statue was constructed by Gaddam Bapu from mancherial district. The family member will visit every year and make pray and worship for lord Hanuman. And recent year the family also established lord nagula statue near putta on top of mountain

== Location ==
The fort, located on the Ramagiri hills, is near the Begumpet village in Ramagiri mandal in Peddapalli district. The fort was built within a thickly forested area that has a wealth of plant species, including many medicinal herbs.

The fort is 22 kilometres (14 mi) away from Peddapalli, the district headquarters. The Peddapalli – Manthani highway passes close to the fort, which is 2 kilometres (1.2 mi) away from the Begumpet village.

== History ==
The fort was built in the 12th century by the Kakatiyas of Warangal. Later, it was controlled by the Qutub Sahi Sultanate from 1518 to 1687, In 1656, the ruler of Golconda, Abdullah Qutb Shah, gave the fort to his son-in-law, one of Aurangzeb's sons. The fort came under the control of the British Raj in 1791. Tradition has it that Kalidasa, one of the greatest Sanskrit poets, was motivated to compose his Meghadūta, a lyrical poem, by the Ramagiri Fort; however, Kalidasa is thought to have lived in the fifth century CE, well before the fort's construction. The Hanuman statue on the mountain was construction by Gaddam Bapu from mancherial district.

== Features ==
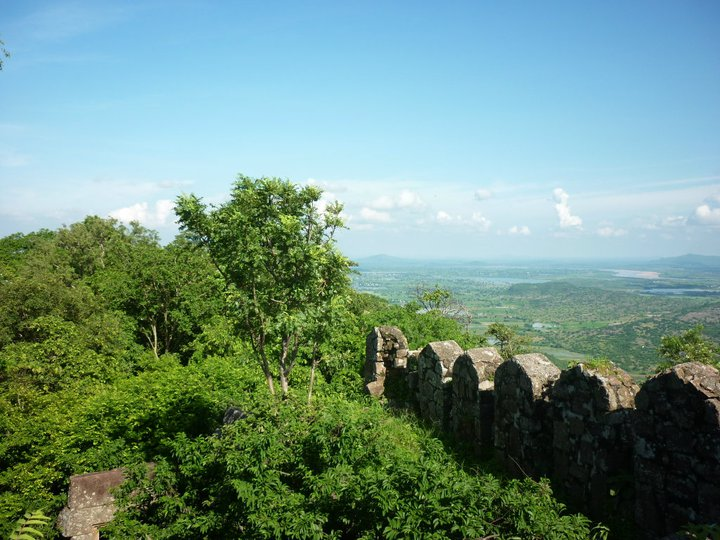
View from the Ramagari Fort

Built in stone, the fort has many bastions and occupies a large area of a few square kilometres. The bastions are in octagonal shape. The fort had been fitted with four forge-welded cannons on the masonry battlements built to a height of 12 metres (39 ft) as part of the fort walls. It has been noted that the mud plaster that covered some of the structures in thick layers was a combination of mud, lime, reeds, hair of animals, or even blood of animals.

== Herbal plants ==
The Ramagiri forest in the area of the fort is an important source for medicinal plants. Large numbers of local medicinal people collect the plants and offer them for sale in nearby towns. Students also visit the area to identify these plants and make herbarium specimens. In view of this importance for medicinal plants, it has been suggested that the forest of the fort area be declared a Medicinal Plants Conservation Center.

== See also ==
- Gurijala Nayaks

== Bibliography ==
- Congress, Indian History (1990). Proceedings – Indian History Congress. p. 775.
- Murthy, K. Lakshmana (1997). Structural Conservation of Monuments in South India. Bhartiya Kala Prakashan. ISBN 978-81-86050-06-4.
- Roy, Kaushik (22 May 2014). Military Transition in Early Modern Asia, 1400–1750: Cavalry, Guns, Government and Ships. A&C Black. ISBN 978-1-78093-813-4.
