= Sakala-nīti-sammatamu =

Anthology of Telugu poems by Madiki Singana

- Author: Madiki Singana
- Original title: సకలనీతిసమ్మతము
- Language: Telugu
- Subject: Moral
- Publisher: Andhra Pradesh Sahitya Akademi, Hyderabad.
- Publication date: 1923, 1979
- Publication place: India
- Pages: 169

Sakala-nīti-sammatamu (Telugu: సకలనీతిసమ్మతము) is an anthology of Telugu poems by Madiki Singana. It is about nīti or morals in the society of Telugu country. The poet belongs to Gurijala Nayaks dynasty of 14th century A.D.

Madiki Singana, the compiler was a poet appropriately calls his book Niti-sammatamu means nīti acceptable to everyone.

== Composition ==
The work is a compilation of some 982 selections from 17 distinct nīti texts by known authors. The authors included Rudradeva I (Nītisāramu), Sivadevayya (Purushārthasāramu), Ganapatideva and Baddena. Authors of many of his niti texts are not known and some texts were lost.

The author classified his selections into 47 categories, covering many topics related to kings, courtiers, physicians, pundits, accountants, scribes etc., His goal appears to be mundane, this-wordly and the only thing that counts in any profession is success.

== Publications ==
It was published for the first time in 1923 under the editorship of Manavalli Ramakrishnakavi. After about 50 years, the Andhra Pradesh Sahitya Akademi published it in 1979. It was edited by Nidudavolu Venkatarao and Ponangi Srirama Apparao.
