= Addanki mandal =

- Mandal
- Interactive map of Addanki mandal
- Location in Andhra Pradesh, India
- Coordinates: 15.812°N 79.971°E
- Country: India
- State: Andhra Pradesh
- District: Prakasam
- Headquarters: Addanki

Area
  - Total: 259.78 km^{2} (100.30 sq mi)

Population (2011)
  - Total: 89,769
  - Density: 345.56/km^{2} (894.99/sq mi)

Languages
  - Official: Telugu
- Time zone: UTC+5:30 (IST)

Addanki is a mandal in the Prakasam district in the Coastal Andhra region of Andhra Pradesh, India. It is the headquarters of Addanki revenue division.

== Demographics ==
Religions in Addanki mandal (2011)
Religion	Percent
Hinduism	94.47%
Islam	4.96%
Other or not stated	0.57%
Distribution of religions

As of 2011 census, the mandal had a population of 89,769 in 23,389 households. The total population constitute, 44,874 males and 44,895 females — a sex ratio of 1000 females per 1000 males. 9,982 children are in the age group of 0–6 years, of which 5,186 are boys and 4,796 are girls — a sex ratio of 925 per 1000. The average literacy rate stands at 63.61% with 50,753 literates. Scheduled Castes and Scheduled Tribes make up 22,312 (24.85%) and 4,127 (4.60%) of the population respectively.

Languages of Addanki mandal (2011)
1. Telugu (94.8%)
2. Urdu (4.12%)
3. Others (1.03%)

At the time of the 2011 census, 94.85% of the population spoke Telugu and 4.12% Urdu as their first language.
