= Kondaveedu Fort =

Ancient hill fortress in Kondaveedu, Andhra Pradesh, India

- Part of Andhra Pradesh
- Palnadu district, Andhra Pradesh, India
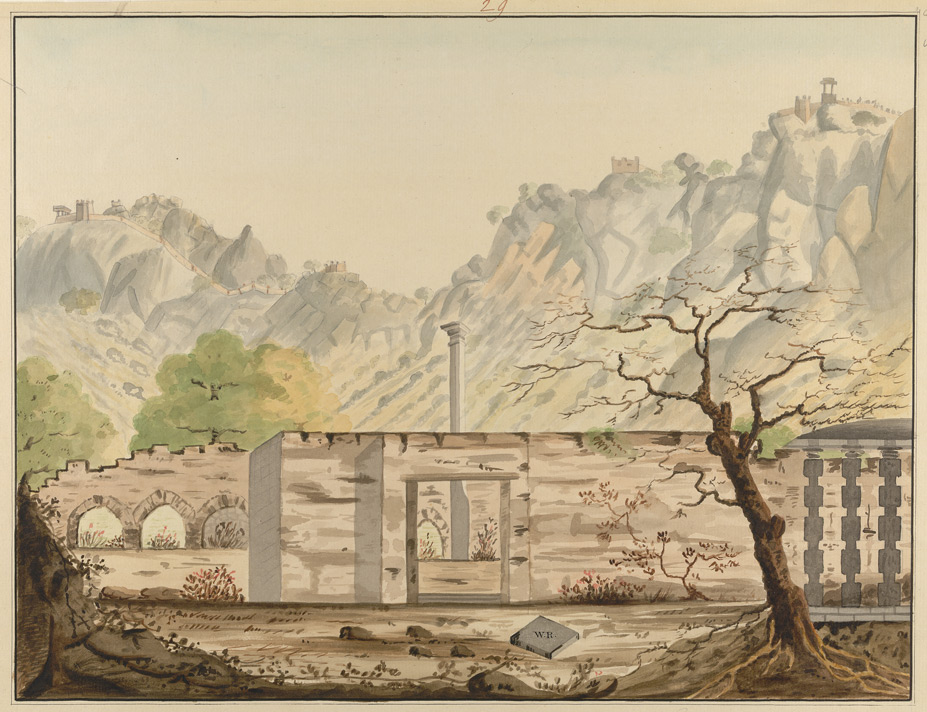
- Water-colour painting of Kondavid Fort

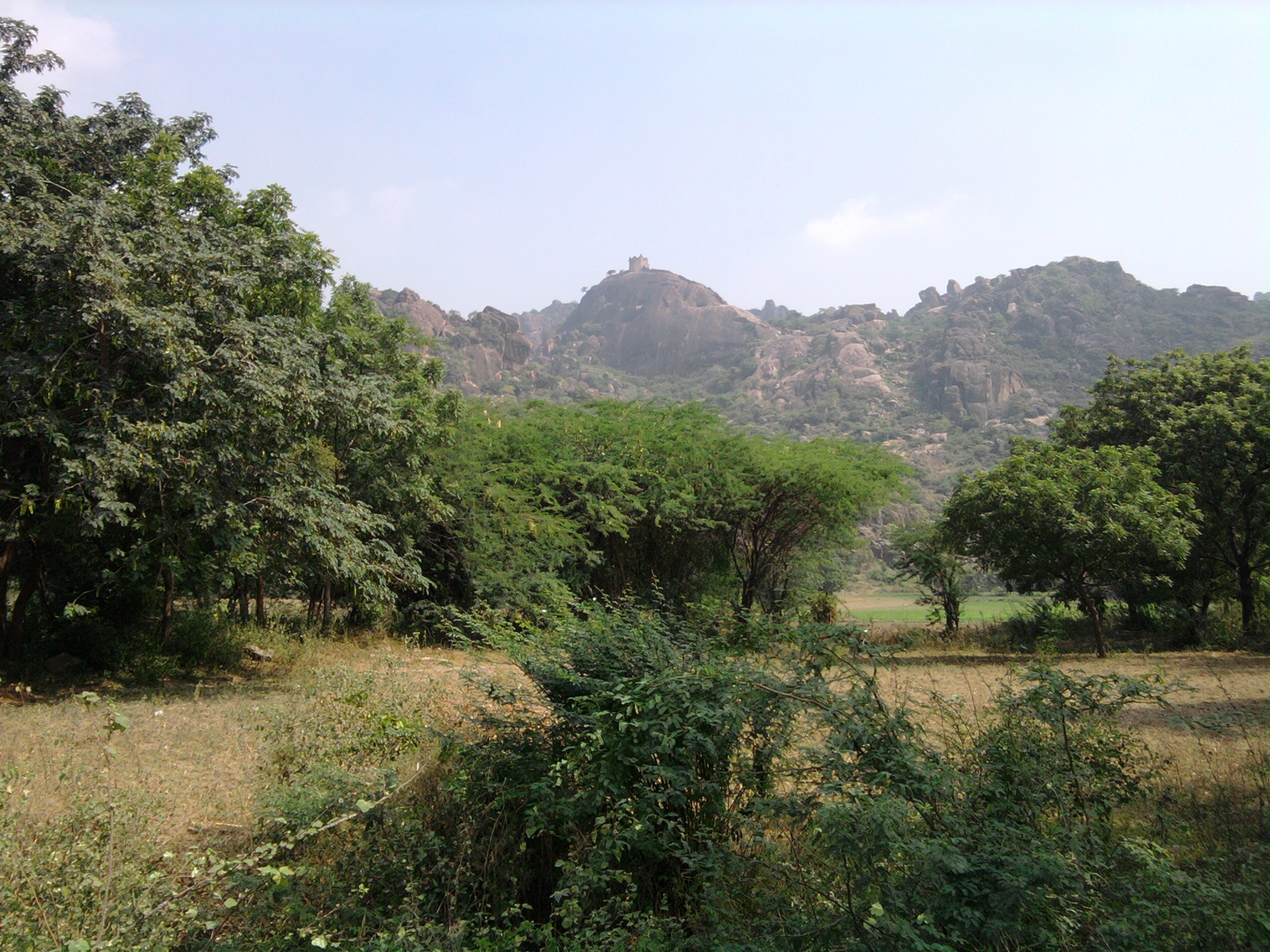
- The Fort today from the base of the hill

Site information
- Type: Fort
- Controlled by: Government of Andhra Pradesh
- Condition: Ruins

Location
- Coordinates: 16.254459°N 80.263866°E

Site history
- Built: 13th century
- Built by: Reddy Kingdom
- Materials: Granite and lime mortar
- Battles/wars: Reddy Kingdom, Gajapati Empire, Vijayanagara Empire, Sultans of Golconda, The French and the British

Kondaveedu Fort is a historically significant ancient hill fortress located in Kondaveedu, a village in the Chilakaluripet constituency of Palnadu district, Andhra Pradesh, India. The site is located 16 miles west of the city of Guntur. Apart from this main fort, there are two other forts (names not known) nearby. Efforts are in progress to classify Kondaveedu Fort as a UNESCO World Heritage Site.

Kondaveedu Fort was constructed by Prolaya Vema Reddy. It was used as the capital by the Reddy dynasty between 1328 and 1482, shifting from their former capital at Addanki. It was taken by the Vijayanagara emperor Krishnadevaraya in 1516. The Golconda Sultans fought for the fort in 1531, 1536 and 1579, and Sultan Quli Qutb Shah finally captured it in 1579, renaming it Murtazanagar.

The fort came under the control of the French colonists in 1752 when it was extensively fortified. It passed on to the British East India Company who got control of the fort in 1788 but abandoned it in the early 19th century in favour of Palnadu district. Now, the massive fortifications and battlements are seen in ruins only. The interior has extensive ruins of magazines and storehouses.

== Geography ==
The fortresses were once the capital of the Kondavidu Reddi Kingdom that was delimited between the south of the Krishna River and the Gundlakamma River and located 8 miles (13 km) to the west of Palnadu district city. They were erected on a high ridge of a small range of hills with average elevation of 1,500 feet (460 m) (highest point on the ridge is 1,700 feet (520 m)). There are two hill (ghat) sections, which form the hill ranges, one is to the north, which provides a very steep but short access to the forts. The preferred access is more circuitous and less tiring and involves 2 miles (3.2 km) of trekking. Kondaveedu and the surrounding forest areas have a large number of Custard apple (Morinda citrifolia (Noni)) trees.

== History ==
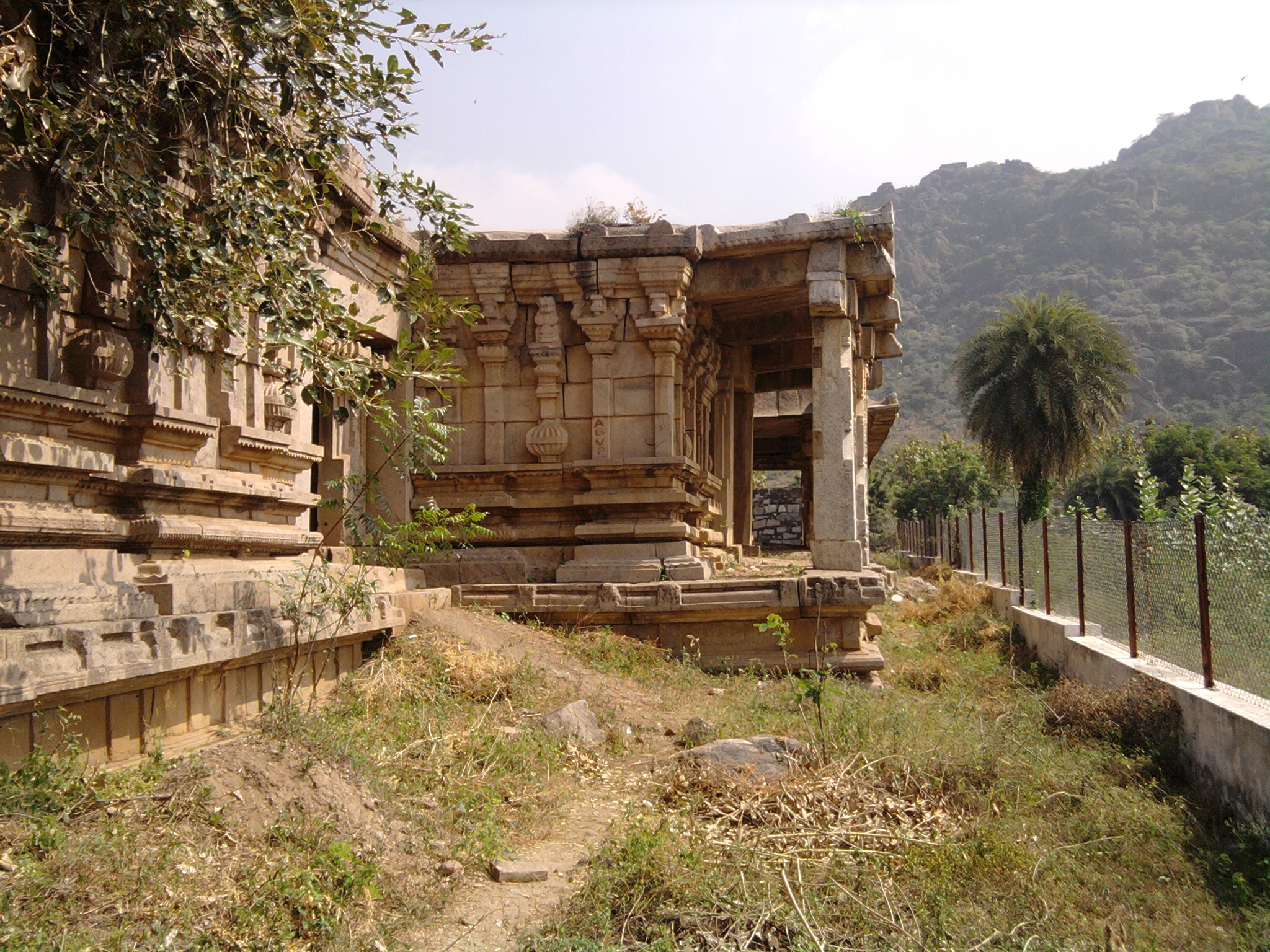
The Gopinathswami Temple near the fort. The surviving fortifications can be seen on the hill top.

The village of Kondavidu is said to have been established in 1115 as a fortified township by Gopanna, a commander of Buddhavarma of the Telugu Chola dynasty. Later it came under the Kakatiyas and was occupied by Prolaya Vema Reddy (r. 1325–1353), who shifted his capital from Addanki to Kondaveedu. Later, the fort was under the control of the Vijayanagara Empire, Gajapatis, Sultanate of Golconda and lastly under the French and British.

In 1323, Warangal and the whole of Andhra Pradesh came under the reign of Tughlaqs rulers of Delhi. Their depredations and despotic reign resulted in the formation of a confederation movement by the Hindu Musunuri Nayaks, who ousted the Muslims from Warangal, and the Reddys were part of this movement.

The Reddys of Kondaveedu were initially feudatories of the kings of Warangal. From inscriptions, it is inferred that their rule overlapped with that of the Korukonda Reddis and that they shifted from their earlier capital at Addanki in Palnadu district to Kondaveedu. The founder of the dynasty was Prolaya Vema Reddy, the son of Prola. They ruled in the region around present-day Vijayawada and Guntur towns for nearly a hundred years (1328–1428). Their first ruler Prolaya Vema Reddy (followed by five other rulers till 1428) who ruled till 1353, strengthened the defenses of his kingdom by building a number of forts, which included the Kondaveedu Fort. He shifted his capital from Addanki in Guntur to Kondaveedu fort. Subsequently, the region was ruled by the Bahmanis (1458), the Vijayanagara Empire (1516), the Qutb Shahis, (1531,1537 & 1579), the Mughal army of Aurangzeb in 1687, the French (1752), the Asaf Jahis, and finally the British (1766 and 1788).

Early in 2019, remains of a Buddhist stupa were found under a dilapidated Hindu temple at Kondaveedu fort. The remains date back to the later Satavahana period — 1st to 2nd century CE. This discovery pushes back of the history of Kondaveedu to the Satavahana period.

Three copper plate grants of Prithvi Sri Mularaja were found in Kondavidu.

== Structure ==
The three forts on top of the narrow hill range are now in ruins; the earliest-built fort dates to the 12th century. The main fort built by the Reddy dynasty and refurbished by subsequent rulers, located at a height of nearly 320 metres (1,050 ft), was considered then as one of the strongest forts in the region. 21 structures have been identified within the fort. Its fortifications built with granite stones comprise huge ramparts, magazines, warehouses, granaries, and wells. There are two entry gates into the forts, called the ‘Kolepalli Darwaza’ and the ‘Nadella Darwaza’. The entrance gate is three-storied, massive and made of granite stone blocks. A building built with rock pillars and covered with rock slabs, has 110 metres (360 ft) long inscriptions. A defense bunker is also seen. The source of water supply to the inhabitants of the fort was from three sources namely, the Mutyalama Cheruvu, the Puttalamma Cheruvu and the Vedulla Cheruvu (‘Cheruvu’ in Telugu language means "pond"). On the way to the fort at Kothapalem (known as Puttakota in the past), at the foothill of the fort, an embankment is seen which is inferred as a security ring bund to protect the royal family palaces and houses of the main functionaries of the fort.

The fort's ruins on the southwest side of the Kondaveedu village is in the shape of an equilateral triangle, and at the turning angles of the triangle at the south west and north east, tower bastions are provided, which form part of the façade wall of the fort. A single wall of 30 kilometres (19 mi) length straddles the hills.

A temple known as the Gopinathaswami temple (dedicated to Krishna) lies at the foot of the hill; its bunched stone pillars are carved out of a single rock. Both Hindu and Muslim architectural styles are seen in the forts. A mosque is also located within the fort.

== Restoration works ==
The department of Archaeology and Museums (Andhra Pradesh) has decided to carry out major development and restoration works to bring out the past glory of the forts. The works proposed involve construction of hill (ghat) road of 3.5 kilometres (2.2 mi) length from the eastern side of the hill (the first step to approach the forts to begin restoration works), resetting and providing railing along the rocky pathway, and improving the view-points, bastions, garrison barracks, stables and internal roads with appropriate tourist signages.
