= Kothapalem =

Kothapalem Akurajupalli
- village
- Interactive map of Kothapalem
- Location in Andhra Pradesh, India
- Coordinates: 16.7°N 80.47°E
- Country: India
- State: Andhra Pradesh
- District: Palnadu

Government
  - Type: Panchayat

Languages
  - Official: Telugu
- Time zone: UTC+5:30 (IST)
- PIN: 522435
- Vehicle registration: AP
- Mandal (sub-division): Machavaram mandal
- Lok Sabha constituency: Palnadu district

Kothapalem or Akurajupalli is a village situated in the Machavaram mandal (sub-division) of the Guntur district, Andhra Pradesh, India

== Geography ==
Kothapalem is located in the eastern part of Palnadu district about 7 kilometres (4.3 mi) from the nearest village, Piduguralla.
