= Reddi Kingdom =

South Indian kingdom (1325–1448)

Reddy Kingdom
- 1325–1448
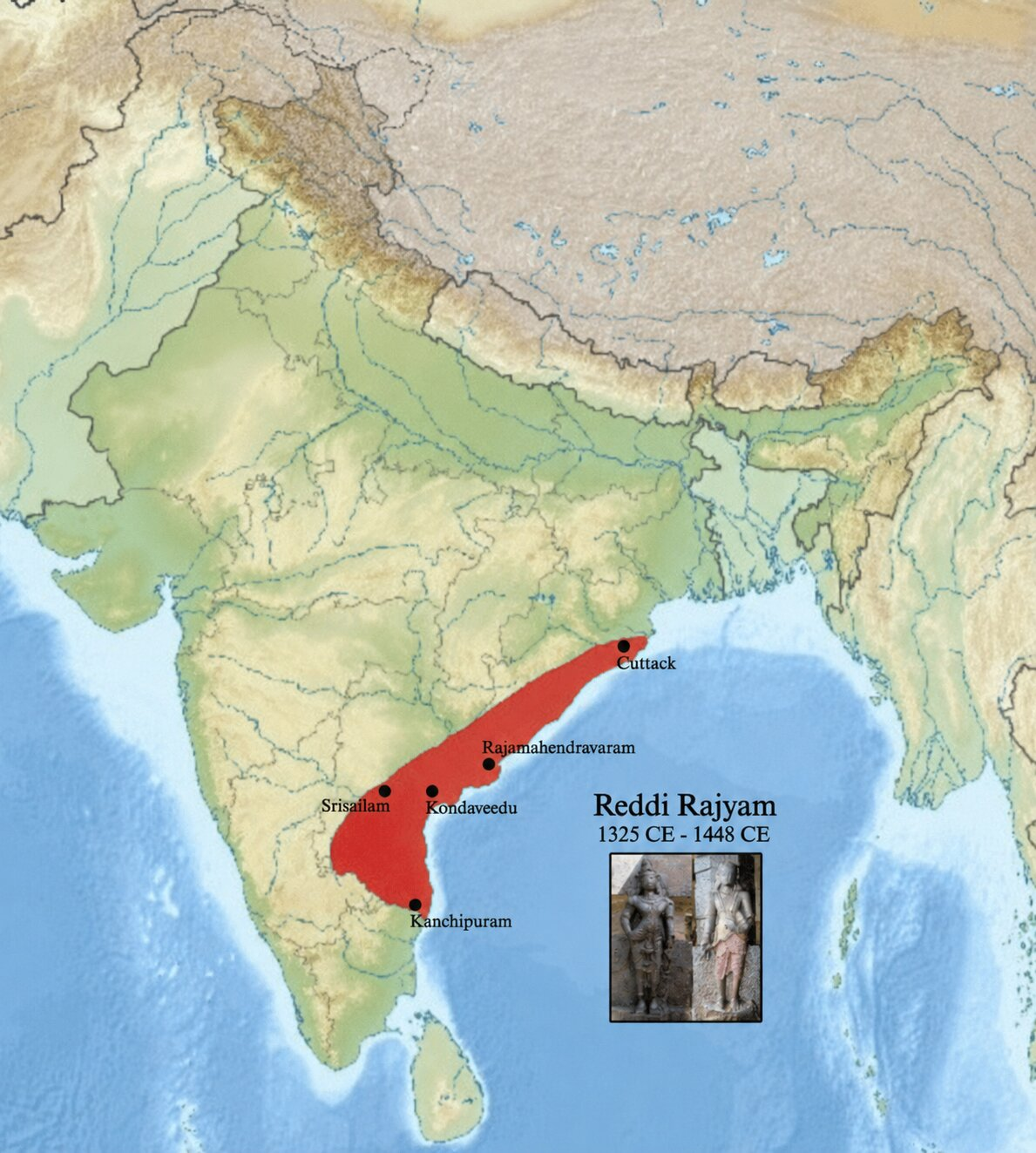
- Reddi Kingdom at its peak
- Capital: Addanki (initial); Kondavidu; Rajahmundry
- Common languages: Telugu, Sanskrit
- Religion: Hinduism
- Government: Monarchy
- Emperor
  - 1325–1353 AD: Prolaya Vema Reddy (first)
  - 1353-1364 AD: Anavota Reddy (second)
  - 1364–1386 AD: Anavema Reddy (third)
  - 1386–1402 AD: Kumaragiri Reddy (fourth)
  - 1395–1414 AD: Kataya Vema Reddy (fifth)
  - 1402–1420 AD: Pedda Komati Vema Reddy (sixth)
  - 1420–1424 AD: Racha Vema Reddy (seventh)
  - 1414–1423 AD: Alladi Reddy (eighth)
  - 1423–1448 AD: Veera Bhadra Reddy (ninth & last)
- Historical era: Medieval India
  - Established: 1325
  - Disestablished: 1448
Preceded by	Succeeded by
Kakatiya dynasty	Vijayanagara Empire; Gajapati Empire
- Today part of: India

The Reddy Kingdom or Kondavidu Reddy Kingdom existed from 1325 to 1448 CE in southern India. Most of the region that was ruled by the kingdom is now part of modern-day central Andhra and Rayalaseema. It was established by Prolaya Vema Reddy in 1325.

== Etymology ==
The now Telugu term "Reddy", whose earlier forms were "Reddi","Raddi", "Rattodi", and "Rattakudi", linked to the Sanskrit term "Rashtrakuta", was used for village headmen, who were responsible for organising the cultivation of the agricultural lands of the villages and collecting taxes. From the seventh century, some of the members of the Rattakudi families had important posts in the administration of the kingdoms. A copperplate record mentioned the grandfather of the founder of the dynasty as a sainya-nayaka, a commander of the forces.

== Origin ==
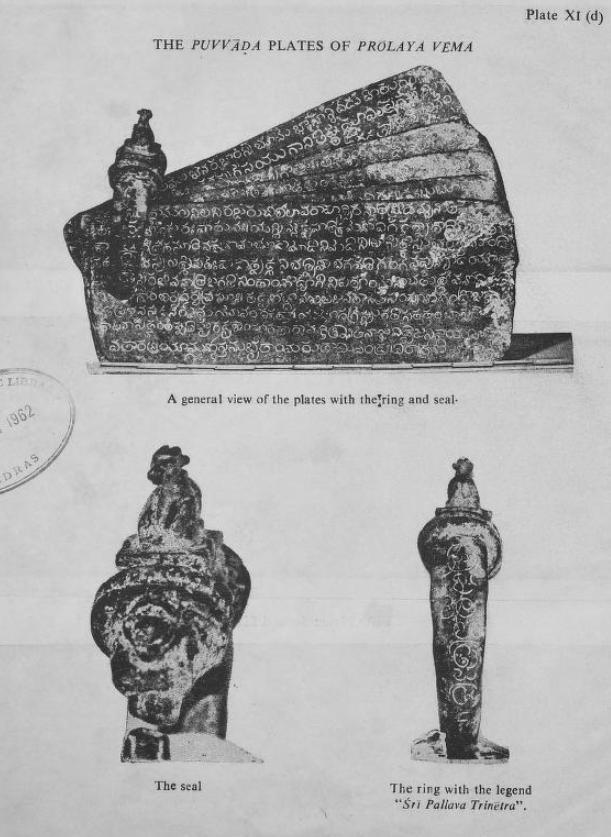
These are the Puvvada copper plates of Prolaya Vema Reddy with the seal of the Reddy kings.

The Reddy rulers played a prominent part in post-Kakatiyas. The Kakatiya empire came to an end in 1323 after the army of the Delhi sultanate invaded Warangal and captured Kakatiya ruler Pratapa Rudra. Warangal fell to the invaders and Ulugh Khan commanded Warangal and Telangana. During this time of foreign invasion and chaos in Telugu country, seeds of revolt were sown by two princes, Annaya Mantri and Kolani Rudradeva. The Tughlaqs failed to keep the region under effective control and infighting coupled with conflict with local Telugu warriors led to the loss of the entire region by 1347.

This led to the rise of the Musunuris (initially based in Coastal Andhra) and Recharlas in the Telangana region, while the coastal belt saw the rise of a third warrior lineage, the Reddis.

The kingdom was established in about 1325 by Prolaya Vema Reddi (also known as Komati Vema). He was succeeded by Anavota Reddi who consolidated the kingdom and established its capital at Kondavidu in Guntur District.

The Reddi kings’ancestors were independent rulers, war lords(Warriors)and were part of the Kakatiya military and held important posts such as the sainya-nayaka.

== Extent of rule ==
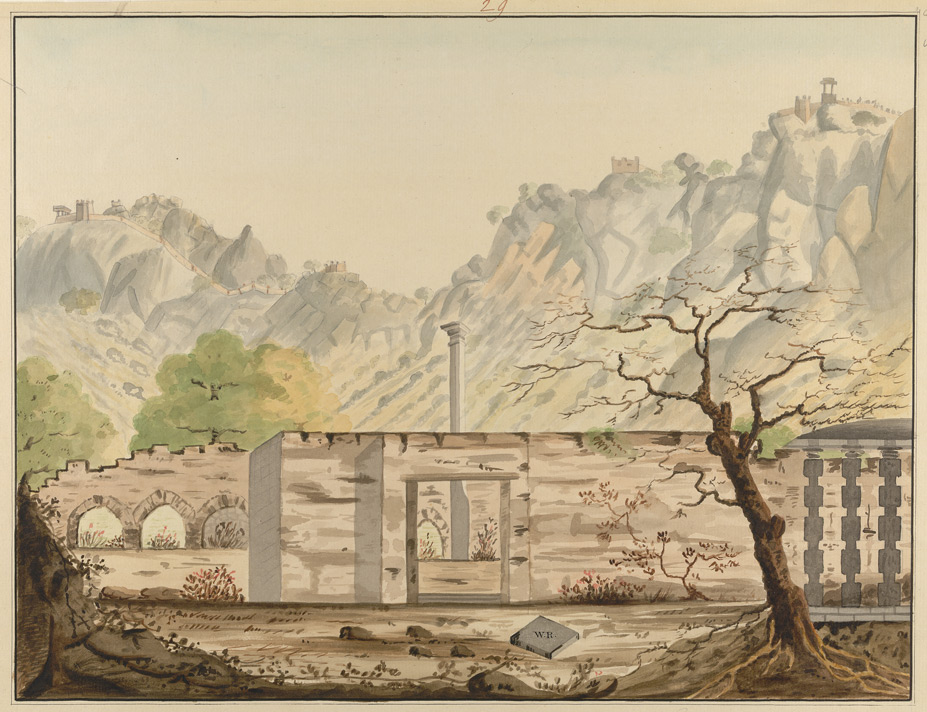
Water colour painting - Kondavidu fort, Reddi Kingdom.

The Reddi kings ruled coastal and central Andhra for over a hundred years from 1325 to 1448. At its maximum extent, the Reddi Kingdom stretched from Cuttack, Orissa to the north, Kanchi to the south and Srisailam to the west. The initial capital of the kingdom was Addanki. Later, it was moved to the fortified Kondavidu to safeguard the kingdom from the regular invasions of Recherla Velama rulers and their Bahamani allies. Another subsidiary branch of the Reddi Kingdom was established in 1395 at Rajahmundry which became independent later. The Reddis were known for their fortifications. Two major hill forts, Kondapalli, 20 km north west of Vijayawada and Kondavidu about 30 km west of Guntur stand testimony to the fort building skill of the Reddi kings. The forts of Bellamkonda, Vinukonda and Nagarjunakonda in the Palnadu region were also part of the Reddi Kingdom. The dynasty remained in power until the mid 15th century. In 1424, Kondavidu was annexed by the Vijayanagara Empire. Rajahmundry was conquered by the Gajapatis some 25 years later. The Gajapatis eventually lost control of coastal Andhra after the defeat of Gajapati Prataprudra Deva by Krishna Deva Raya of Vijayanagara.

== Religion ==
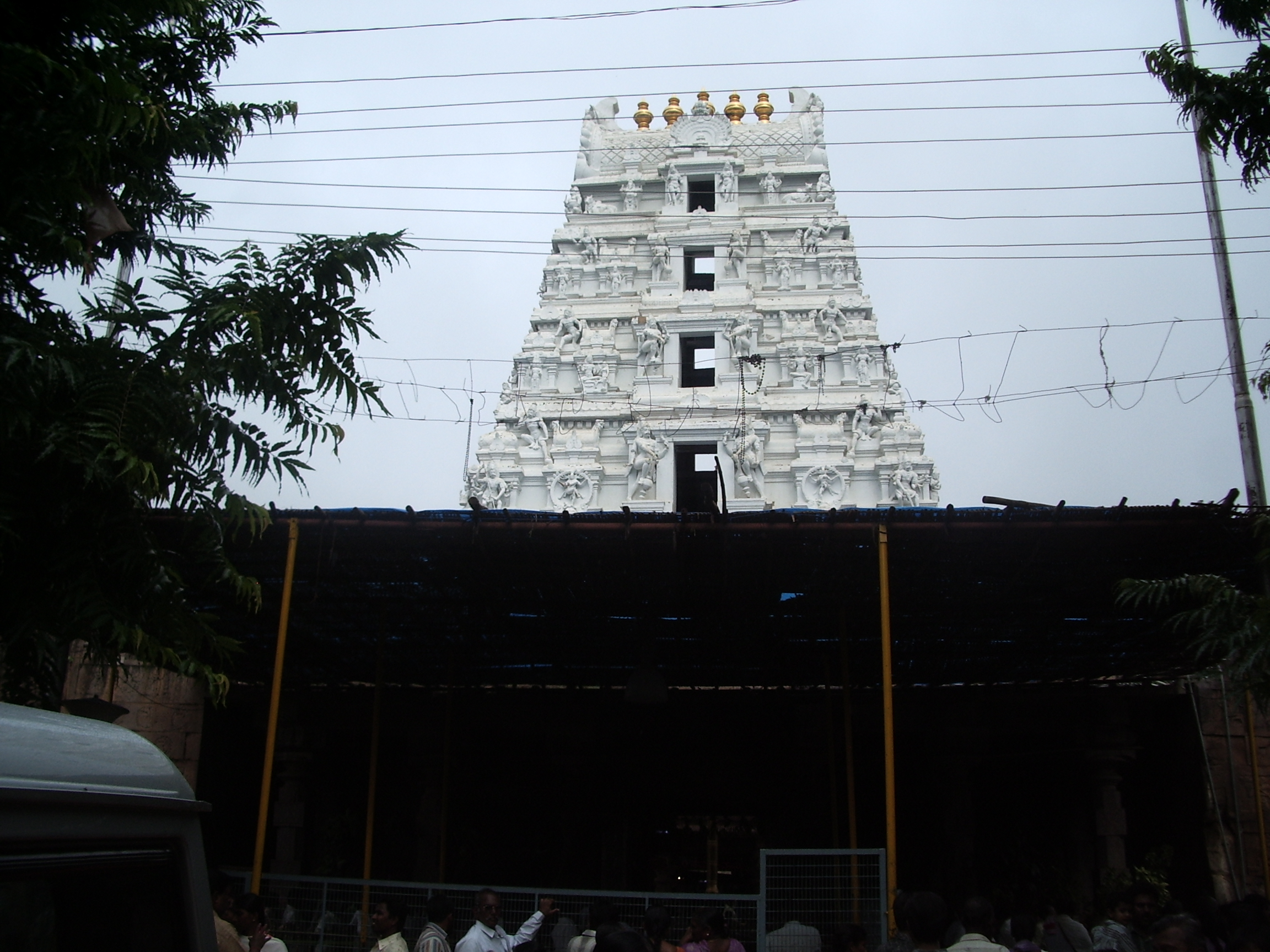
Mallikarjuna Swamy Temple, Srisailam

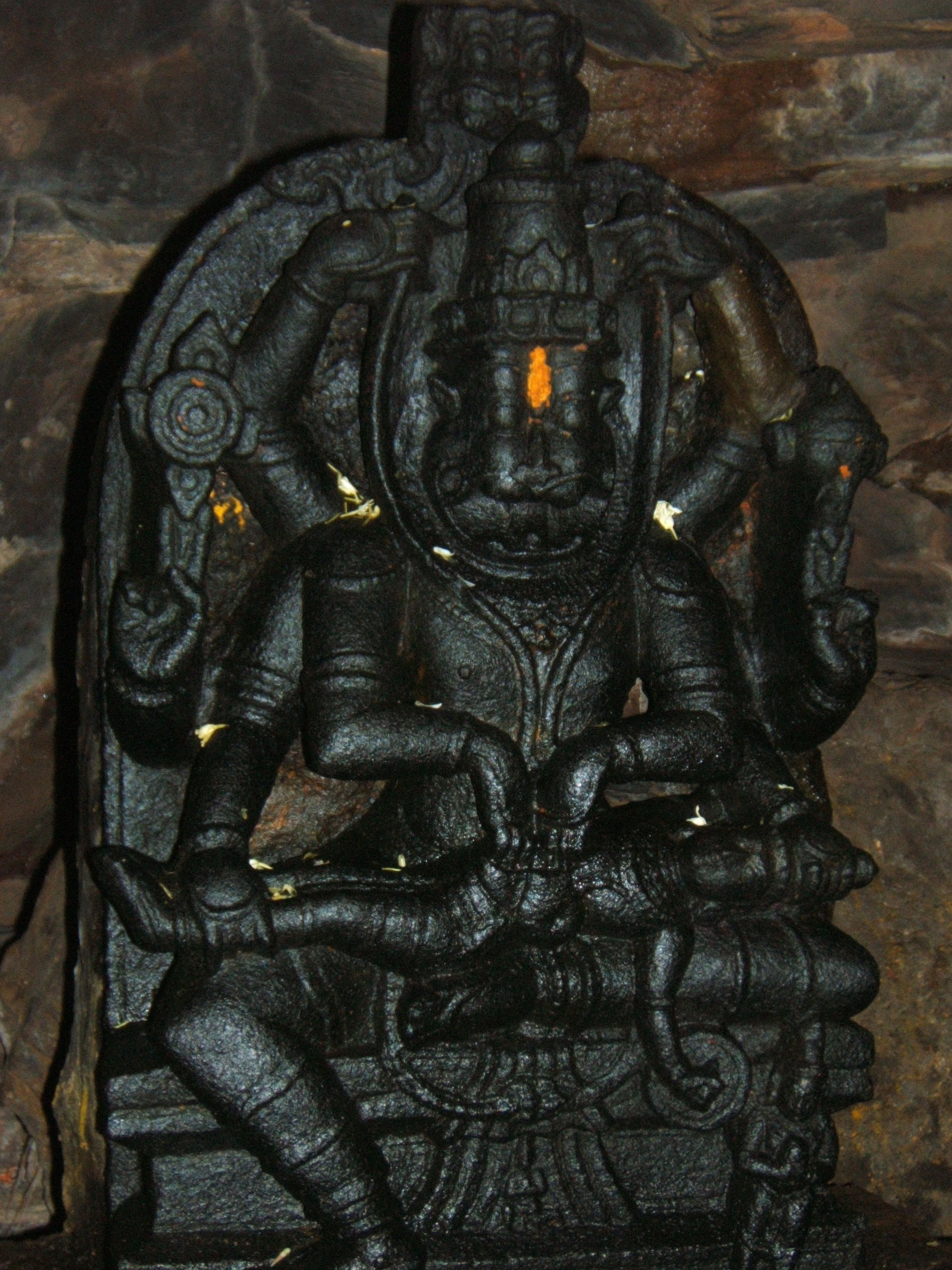
Lord Narasimha, Ahobilam

The Reddi rulers patronised and protected Hinduism and its institutions. The Brahmins were given liberal grants by the Reddi kings and the agraharas of Brahmins were restored. Vedic studies were encouraged. The Hindu temples of Srisailam, Tirumala, Vontimitta and Ahobilam were provided with more facilities. Prolaya Vema Reddi bestowed a number of agraharas on the Brahmins. He was revered by the title of Apratima-Bhudana-Parasurama. He commissioned major repairs to the Srisailam Mallikarjuna Swami temple, and had a flight of steps built from the Krishna River to the temple. The Narasimha Swamy temple at Ahobilam was built during his reign. He built 108 temples for Shiva.

The tutelary deity (Kula devi) of the Reddi kings was Mullamguramma, originally a local village goddess (gramadevata) named after the village of Mullanguru (present-day Ameenabad, Guntur district). According to an early fourteenth-century record, the Reddi ruler Peddakomati Vema Reddi built a temple for her, endowed it with three villages for her regular worship, and praised the goddess as the mother of the whole world.

In succeeding centuries, a court poet of Kataya Vema recorded the existence of a temple dedicated to the deity in the dynasty's new capital of Rajamahendravaram. By this time, she had been co-opted into the Saivite tradition and was identified and worshipped as a form of Uma (Parvati).

== Literature ==
Telugu literature blossomed under the Reddi kings. The Reddi kings also patronized Sanskrit. Several of the Reddi kings themselves were distinguished scholars and authors. Kumaragiri Reddi, Kataya Vema Reddi and Pedakomati Vema Reddi were the most outstanding among them. Errapragada (Errana), Srinatha and Potana were poets during this period. Errapragada, the last of the Kavitraya (Trinity of Poets) was the court poet of Prolaya Vema Reddi. He completed the Telugu translation of the Mahabharata. He completed the rendition of the Aranya Parva of Mahabharata left incomplete by Nannaya Bhattu (Aadi Kavi who started the translation of Mahabharata into Telugu). He wrote Hari Vamsa and Narasimha Purana. Errana's translation of the Ramayana in Chapu form (a style of poetry) has been lost.

== Administration ==
Reddi Kings (1325–1448 CE)
Prolaya Vema Reddi	(1325–1353)
Anavota Reddi	(1353–1364)
Anavema Reddi	(1364–1386)
Kumaragiri Reddi	(1386–1402)
Kataya Vema Reddi	(1395–1414)
Peda Komati Vema Reddi	(1402–1420)
Racha Vema Reddi	(1420–1424)
Allada Reddi	(1414–1423)
Veerabhadra Reddi	(1423–1448)

The administration was carried according to the "Dharmasutras". One-sixth of agriculture surplus was levied as tax. Under the reign of Anavota Reddi, custom duties and taxes on trade were lifted. As a result, trade flourished. Sea trade was carried through the port Motupalli. A large number of merchants settled down near it.

== See also ==
- History of Andhra Pradesh

== Book sources ==
- Farooqui, Salma Ahmed (2011), A Comprehensive History of Medieval India: From Twelfth to the Mid-Eighteenth Century, Pearson Education India, ISBN 978-81-317-3202-1
- Durga Prasad, G. (1988), History of the Andhras up to 1565 A.D. (PDF), Guntur: P. G. Publishers, archived from the original (PDF) on 14 February 2019
- Raghunadha Rao, P. (1994), History and Culture of Andhra Pradesh: From the earliest times to the present day, Sterling Publishers, ISBN 81-207-1719-8
- Rao, Velcheru Narayana (2003). "Multiple Literary Cultures in Telugu: Court, Temple and Public". In Sheldon I. Pollock (ed.). Literary cultures in history: reconstructions from South Asia. University of California Press. pp. 383–436. ISBN 978-0-520-22821-4.
- Rao, Velcheru Narayana; Shulman, David (2012), Srinatha: The Poet Who Made Gods and Kings, Oxford University Press, ISBN 978-0199863044
- Somasekhara Sarma, Mallampalli (1946), History of the Reddi Kingdoms (c. 1325–1448 A.D.), Waltair: Andhra University – via archive.org
- Talbot, Cynthia (2001), Pre-colonial India in Practice: Society, Region, and Identity in Medieval Andhra, Oxford University Press, ISBN 978-0-19803-123-9
