= Khammam Fort =

10th-century hill fort in southern India

- Part of Stambhadri Hills
- Khammam, Telangana, India

Site information
- Type: Hill Fort
- Owner: Government of India
- Controlled by: Musunuri Nayaks 1210 A. D. - 1369 A. D. Gurijala Nayaks 1369 A. D. - 1433 A. D. Independent rulers 1512 A. D. -1515 A.D Sri Krishnadevaraya of Tuluva Dynasty 1515 A.D for a brief period Qutb Shahi dynasty 1518 A.D - 1687 A.D Mughal Empire 1687 A.D - 1707 A.D Asaf Jahi Dynasty 1707 A.D-1948 A.D India (1948 - Till date)
- Open to the public: Yes
- Condition: Declared Protected Monument by Archaeological Survey of India in 2005. Mostly Destroyed.

Location
- Location in Telangana
- Coordinates: 17.245012°N 80.146736°E
- Height: 867 metres (2,844 ft)

Site history
- Built by: Musunuri Nayaks
- In use: Tourism
- Materials: Stone, Limestone mortar
- Battles/wars: Musunuri Nayaks, Gurijala Nayaks, Qutub Shahis, Aurangazeb, Sri Krishnadevaraya and Local Rulers
- Events: Stambhadri Sambaralu,1000 Year Celebrations of Khammam Khilla

Garrison information
- Occupants: Musunuri Nayaks - 1210 A. D. - 1369 A. D. Gurijala Nayaks 1369 A. D. - 1433 A. D. Krishna Deva Raya of Tuluva Dynasty, Shitab Khan - 1515 A.D - 1518 A.D Qutb Shahi dynasty- 1518 A.D - 1687 A.D Aurangazeb of the Mughal Empire - 1687 A.D - 1707 A.D Asaf Jahi Dynasty - 1707–1948 A.D

Khammam Fort is a hill fort with a history of over a thousand years. History says that it was built during the Kakatiya period. This place, mentioned as "Khammamettu" in ancient inscriptions, is a historical center that combines spirituality, strategic importance, and architectural splendor.

The foundation stone for the construction of this fort was laid in 950 CE. Three farmers from the village of Velugumatla—Ranga Reddy, Laxma Reddy, and Velma Reddy—discovered a treasure while working in the fields and, with the permission of the Kakatiya lords, used the money to build the fort. Initially built with mud, the fort was later made into a permanent structure with granite stones. The pond dug by Laxma Reddy eventually became known as the "Lakaram Cheruvu".

The construction of this fort was completed in the year 1006. After that, Khammam Fort continued to be under the control of the Reddy dynasty for 300 years. Later, the Velama kings, Nandavani, Kallur and Gudluru dynasties ruled this fort. After the fall of the Kakatiya Empire, 74 feudal kings fought for ten years under the leadership of Musuruli with the aim of unifying the Telugu land. In this struggle, Odra Gajapathi Raja conquered Khammam Fort and Mahendra heroes like Kapa Naidu and Pola Naidu took (Musunuri Nayaks.) over the rule.

In the 15th century, Sitapati Raju, who came to rule Khammam fort, was appointed as the regent of Warangal with the help of the Bahmani Sultans. He was known by the Muslim title "Shitab Khan". With the help of Peddamatyudu, who served as his minister, he tried to revive the Telugu kingdom in Telangana. The research of Adiraju Veerabhadra Rao has shown that the term "Chittabja Khanudu" in the "Golkonda Seema Kavyalu" is related to him.

Sitapati Raja, to preserve the Hindu sculptural heritage, buried the idols of Shiva, Vishnu, the Dwarapalakula, the Rajanartaki, and the Sun God in the ground. These were unearthed during excavations and the Archaeological Department preserved them near the Ganapeshwara Temple. He is also credited with restoring the Orugallu Panchalaraya Temple.

Sultan Quli Qutb Mulk, who defeated Sitapati Raju in 1531, brought Khammam Fort under the control of the Qutb Shahis. In 1687, Aurangzeb invaded Golconda and captured the fort. Later, Khammam Fort came under the rule of the Nizam, and in 1722, Nizam Mulki Asalji declared independence and was officially taken over by the Nizam government in 1937.

== Etymology ==
The historical records show that the earlier name was "Kambham mettu" or "Stambhadri". "Mettu" means hill or highland in the Telugu language. The name was also anglicised as "Commomet" and "Khammammet".khammam fort is also called as killa

== Lineage of rulers ==
Period	Rulers
1210–1369	Musunuri leaders
1369–1433	Leaders of the ghettos
1512–1515	Independent rulers
1515–1518	Shitab Khan (King of Sitapati)
1518–1614	Qutub Shahi dynasty
1615 -1685	Sri Krishna Deva Raya
1687–1707	Mughal Empire
1707–1948	Asaf Jahi clan
1948–present	Government of India

== Construction ==
The architectural style of Khammam Qilla is a mixture of influences from many religions. Hindu sculpture, Islamic towers, and Buddhist influences are visible in the architecture of this fort. The fort is spread over an area of four square kilometers. The height of the wall is 40 to 80 feet and the width is 15 to 20 feet. The fort has 10 gates, of which the lion gate known as Pattar Darwaza is the largest. The fort has a capacity to deploy 60 cannons. Inside the fort there is an old mosque and a mahal built during the time of Jafar Daula. There is a 60-foot-long and 20-foot-wide Jafar Daula well. The water channels, stone steps, and guard towers were built very scientifically to store rainwater. Local stories also say that there is a secret tunnel to escape in case of a siege on the fort.

== Architecture & Significant Features ==
- This Fort is located in an area of 4 Sq. miles in the heart of the City of Khammam on top of a massive granite Hill. It is surrounded by a huge rock wall averaging between 40 and 80 feet(13 to 25 Meters) in height and 15 to 20 feet(4.5 to 6 Meters) in width. There are steps from each buruju (bastion) to enter into the fort. The Fort was considered practically impregnable by invading armies.
- A number of balconies and windows are constructed along the wall in order to use the artillery during wartime. It has a capacity of mounting at least 60 cannons at a time.
- The fort 10 large gates most of them in poor shape now. Each gate has cannons mounted on them along with a water pot made of rocks. They are built such that an impact of a cannonball could not break it.
- The main entrance is a 30-foot tall entrance known as the Khilla darwaza (meaning fort gate in Urdu). It has 2 cannons on either side of the entrance. One of them still mounted with a head. They are now partially destroyed due to the negligence of the archeology department.
- The east gate or the secondary entrance is equally large and is popularly known as the Raathi Darwaza (meaning stone entrance in Urdu) or Potha Darwaza.
- All other gates are smaller than the main entrance and could have been constructed to avoid large cavalries to enter the fort in case of an attack.
- A huge rainwater catchment system and well have been constructed on the Khilla during the period of Zafar-ud-doula, well known for construction of tanks during Qutb shahi dynasty. This massive tank is now known as the 'Zafar well'. It is 60 feet X 30 feet stepped well with a bridge across it for men and horses to move around. He also built the walls using Bricks and limestone along the fort.
- As soon as we enter the Khilla darwaza, one can see the Fort at a distance of 300 feet. There are small steps carved out of this hill to reach the top of the Hill fort. They are later renovated with railings for the steps by the Tourism department and Archaeological Survey of India in 2005 during the 1000 year celebrations of this historical fort. A lot of small gates known as 'Dalohiswar' are all around the walls of the fort.
- Fort has at least 15 bastions constructed with two massive walls as a military strategy to take the impact of the cannonballs and to counter the enemy from the top. A 15-foot deep trench is dug in some places for the army to store and use as a hiding place.
- The huge blocks of stone used for the walls are as long as 10 feet and are believed to be transported using elephants and men. No mud or limestone is used in this huge wall and the rocks are tightly placed and leaving the viewers amazed by the construction
- A permanent Gallows has been erected on this prominent hill fort, where the estimated seat of justice could have been inside the fort. The platform is made of Stone and appears like a well, due to which the locals call this 'Nethi bhavi' ('నేతి బావి 'meaning Ghee well). This stone structure could be seen from allover the city of khammam.
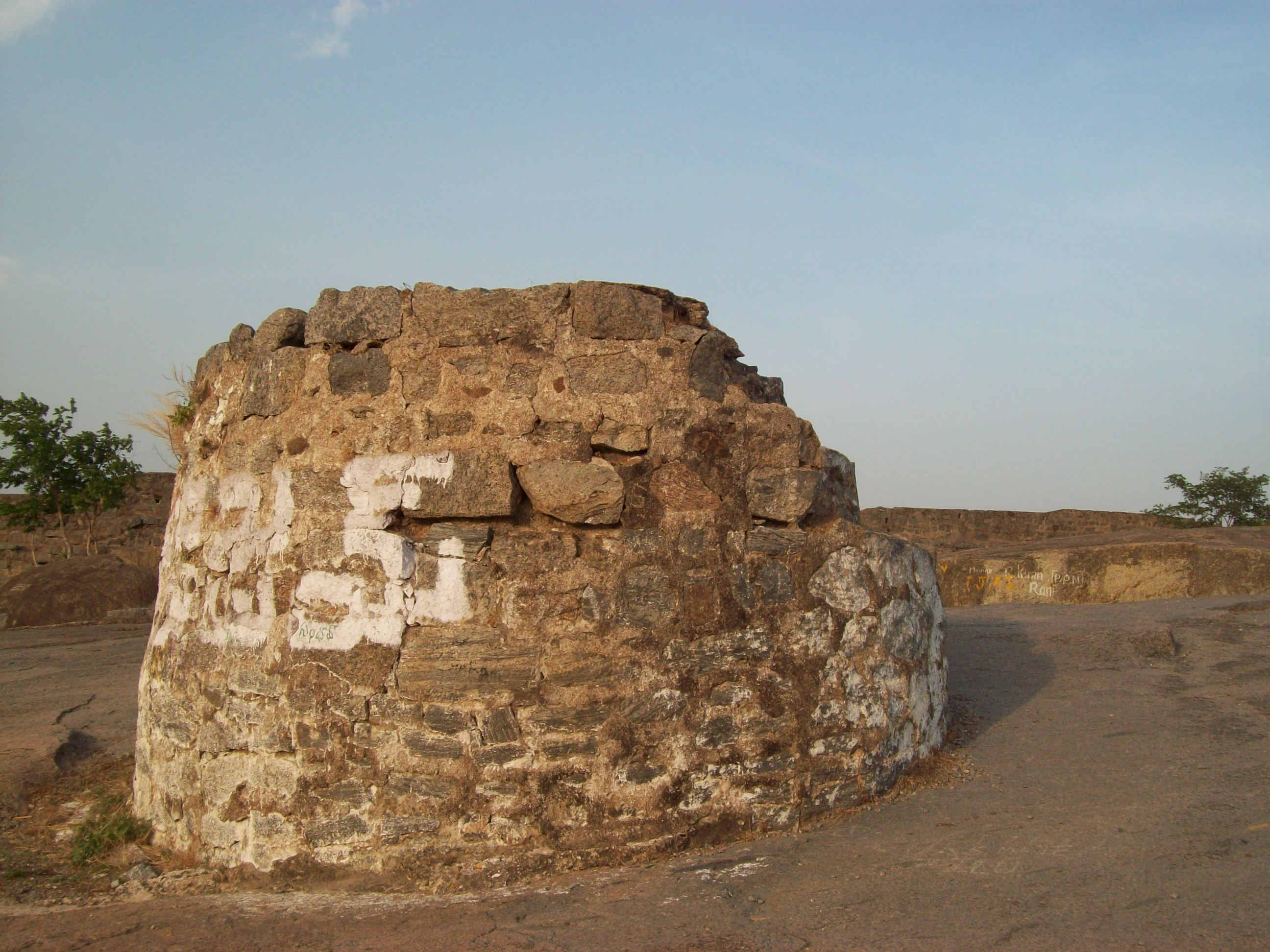
  Stone Gallows, locally believed to be a Ghee well on top of the fort
- The fort is believed to have a secret tunnels to the Warangal Fort with multiple entrances in different locations at the fort. One such entrance is 10 feet in diameter and the steps to enter the tunnel are closed due to damage over the years. The local folklore includes stories about valuables being transferred between the kings from here using the secret passages and escaping enemy attacks through them.

== Culture ==
This fort appears to be a replicate the cultures of both Hindu and Muslim rulers who ruled this fort city.

The Lakshmi Narasimha swami temple in Brahmin bazar, Sri Ramalingeshwara temple is one of the oldest shivalayam (Shiva temple) are some of the oldest Hindu temples in Telangana and are older than the fort itself.

Instead of destroying the sculptural wealth at the hands of the Mohammedans, he buried and preserved the idols of Shiva, Vishnu gatekeepers, Rajanartaki and Surya Bhagavan in the ground.

These were discovered during excavations, and the Department of Archeology preserved them near Ganapeshwara Temple.

During the Qutb shahi dynasty, many new places of worship have been constructed in and around the fort such as the Khilla masjid.

== Governance restrictions and administrative changes ==
Khammam Qilla became a place in history where 74 vassal kings fought for ten years under the leadership of Musuruli with the aim of unifying Telugu after the Kakatiyas.

1424 CE: Odra Gajapati Raja conquered this durga and Mahendra heroes like Kapa Naidu and Pola Naidu took over.

1504–1512 CE: Sitapati Raja (Shitab Khan) was the ruler of Khammam Qilla. He was appointed as the regent of Warangal with the help of Bahmani Sultans.

He worked extensively for the restoration of the Telugu Empire with the help of his grandfather. During his time, Khammam became the main center of Telangana.

== Sitapati Raja – Chittabja Khan ==
In "Golkonda Seema Kavyalu" the word "Chitabja Khanu" is related to Sitapati Raja in the research of Adi Raju Veerabhadra Rao.

He is a descendant of Bhogikula of Naga clan.

His bravery in saving Orugallu, Bellankoda and Khammam Durgas is praised in texts like Rayavachakam.

According to the Krishnazilla Manual (1883), he commanded a force of 12,000 archers.

== Changes in Islamic governance ==
1531 CE: Sultan Kulikutb Mulk defeats Sitapati Raja and takes Khammam Qilla under Qutb Shahis.

1687 CE: Aurangzeb invaded Golconda and captured Khammam Fort.

1722 CE: Nizam Mulki Asalji declared independence and brought Khammam Qilla under Nizam rule.

1761–1803 CE: Jafar Daulah developed the fort as Tehsildar. Dhamsalapuram village was founded in his name.

1937 CE: Khammam Qilla was officially taken over by the Nizam's government.

== Visit Of Sri Krishna Devaraya ==
Kaviraja, who taught Telugu lessons in the national language, proved the relationship of this fort with historical evidence.

AD In 1615 Srikashnadevaraya defeated Kulikuthubshahi and captured Khammam Durga. Srikashnadevaraya of Andhra Bhoja also conquered it as part of his Digvijayatra and acquired it from the Gajapaths in 1615. In Parijatapaharanam written by Nukka Thimmana, in the context of describing the bravery of Kritipati Krishnadevaraya, the description of Parijatapaharanam Prabandha as "Gambambumetta Grakkanan Gadalche" confirms this on literary basis.

That complete poem is Udayadri vega yatyuddhati aghebe, - Vinukonda matamatrana harinchen, gutamu lsedarang gondavi dagalinche, - bellamukonda yachchellan jeriche, devarakonda yudvritti bhangamu sese, - jalli palle samsengsakthi dulichen, ginuka meer nanantagiri gindupadan jese, - Gambambumetta Grakkanan Gadalche Balnikayamu Kalimattulane Yadanchu Gatakamu Ninka Nanuchu Nutkalamahishu Danudinamnu Vretchu Nevdu Rajamatru! Srikrishna Rayavibhundu.

== Encroachments ==
The fort, once mighty bastion of royal dynasties, continues to face further encroachment threat due to lack of proper monitoring mechanism. Large settlements occupied the areas in and around the fort due to the lack of proper monitoring of encroachments. Destruction of the granite hill and construction of houses continues till today around the fort area.

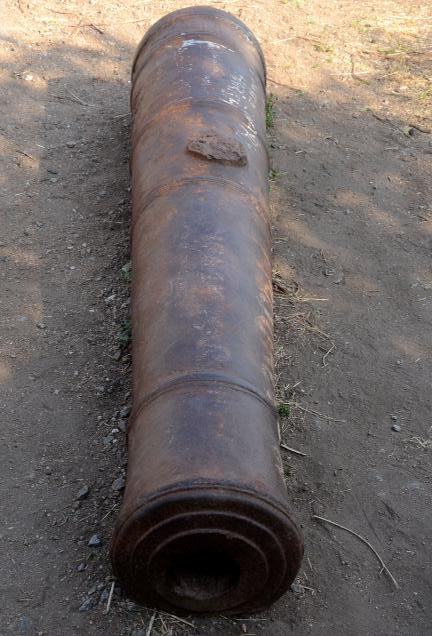
Ruins of the Cannons inside the fort

== Development ==
On the occasion of Tourism Day, rock climbing activities are organized on the fort. Many festivals are held on the fort on national festivals. In 2010, during the coronation celebrations of Shri Krishna Devaraya, the then Collector Rayala's statue was installed on the fort. Even that statue has fallen into ruins today. When Renuka Chaudhary was Kendramanvoothi, a railing was installed and steps were carved to go up to the fort. Two petal shades have been constructed on the fort for tourists to rest. Recently Minister for Roads & Buildings Tummala Nageswara Rao has mooted the proposal to set up solar streetlights at the fort well before the next Independence Day celebrations in 2017.

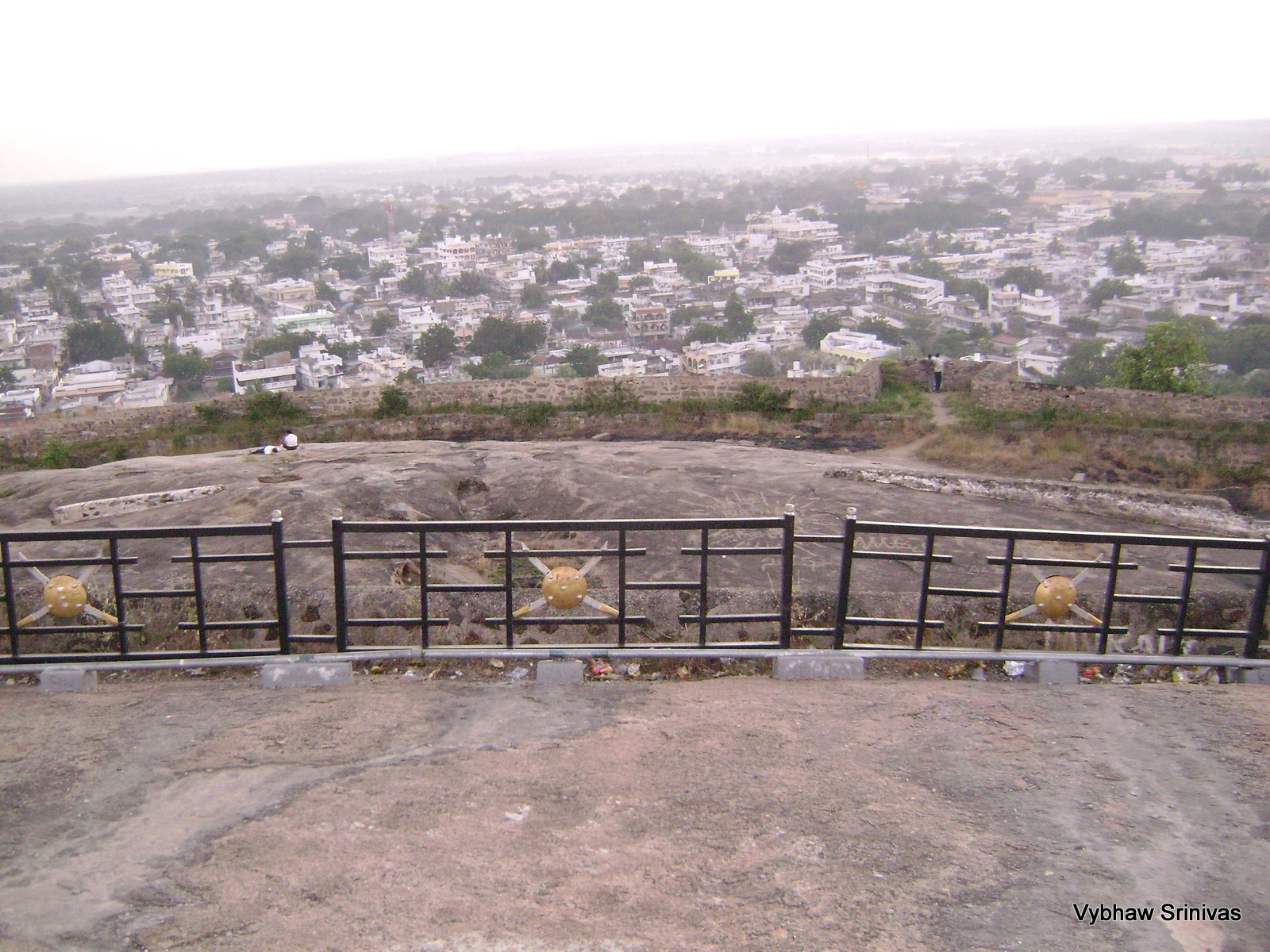
Khammam City View from the top of the Fort

== See also ==
- Musunuri Nayaks
