= Gurijala Nayaks =

Indian clan

Gurijala Dynasty
- 1325 A. D.–1433 A. D.
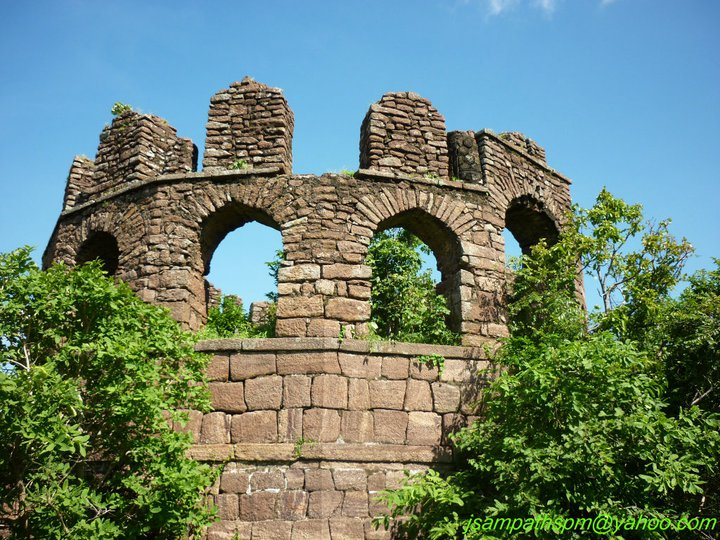
- Ramagiri Fort
- Capital: Ramagiri Fort
- Common languages: Telugu
- Religion: Hinduism
- Government: Monarchy
- Historical era: Medieval India
  - Established: 1325 A. D.
  - Disestablished: 1433 A. D.
Preceded by
Kakatiya dynasty
Delhi Sultanate
Musunuri Nayaks
Succeeded by
Bahamani Sultanate

Gurijala Nayakas were a Kamma clan who ruled Ramagiri Fort as capital during 14th and 15th centuries. Most famous of this clan was king Gurijala Muppa Bhupathi. He patronised famous poet Madiki Singana.
