= Addanki =

- Town
- Location in Andhra Pradesh, India Addanki (India)
- Coordinates: 15.8167°N 79.9833°E
- Country: India
- State: Andhra Pradesh
- District: Prakasam
- Mandal: Addanki

Government
  - Body: Addanki municipal council

Area
  - Total: 45.00 km^{2} (17.37 sq mi)

Population (2011)
  - Total: 40,356
  - Density: 896.8/km^{2} (2,323/sq mi)

Languages
  - Official: Telugu
- Time zone: UTC+5:30 (IST)
- PIN: 523201
- Telephone code: +91–8593
- Vehicle registration: AP 27, AP 39
- Website: ADDANKI.In

Addanki is a town in Prakasam district of the Indian State, Andhra Pradesh. Addanki North is the mandal headquarters of Addanki mandal in Addanki revenue division.

== Geography ==
Addanki located at 15.8167°N 79.9833°E. It has an average elevation of 24 meters (82 ft). It is located between Guntur (85 kilometres (53 mi), Ongole (36 kilometres (22 mi), Chilakaluripet (44 kilometres (27 mi), Narasaraopet (50 kilometres (31 mi), Vijayawada (120 kilometres (75 mi), and Darsi (34 kilometres (21 mi))

Addanki is located in the bank of Gundlakamma river. This river is the main resource of drinking water for Addanki.

== History ==
Reddi kingdom was founded with Addanki as its capital by Prolaya Vema in 1325 AD. It was ruled till 1355 AD by him and his son Anavotha reddy, after which the capital was shifted to Kondaveedu.

=== Addanki inscription ===
The inscription, a replica of the original one which was excavated near Thousand Pillar Temple of Addanki, stands testimony to a flourishing Telugu literature much before the available literary texts. Locals believe that this is the first poem ever to be written in Telugu. Starting with the Boya campaign, Pandaranga got victories in all military campaigns of his master Gunaga Vijayaditya III. The inscription spoke about the donation of land by the king to him for his successful military exploits. A noted scholar-poet of those times, he had translated Sanskrit poems into Telugu.

== Politics ==
Addanki is an assembly constituency in Andhra Pradesh. Addanki, Ballikurava, Korisapadu, Panguluru, and Santamaguluru are the 5 mandals that come under Addanki Assembly Constituency. Addanki assembly comes under Bapatla parliament constituency. Present MLA Gottipati Ravi Kumar, He has been elected to the Andhra Pradesh Legislative Assembly five times, with four terms representing the Addanki Assembly constituency and one term for Martur Assembly constituency. AND Present MP KRISHNA PRASAD TENNETI (Bapatla).

== Transport ==
=== Road ===
Addanki is a well connected with all major cities and towns via road due to its geographical position between Guntur (70 kilometres (43 mi)), Ongole(36 kilometres (22 mi)) and Chilakaluripet (44 kilometres (27 mi)) and Narasaraopet (50 kilometres (31 mi)) and Darsi (34 kilometres (21 mi)). It has better connectivity to Hyderabad via NH16 and SH12 thus saves the distance of 102 kilometres (63 mi) on the Chennai – Ongole - Miryalaguda – Hyderabad route compared to the route via NH5.

=== Railway ===
The nearest railway stations to addanki is Ongole Railway Station which is at 38.6 kilometres (24.0 mi) distance and another railway station Narasaraopet Railway Station which is at 51 kilometres (32 mi) distance.
