= Gundlakamma Reservoir Project =

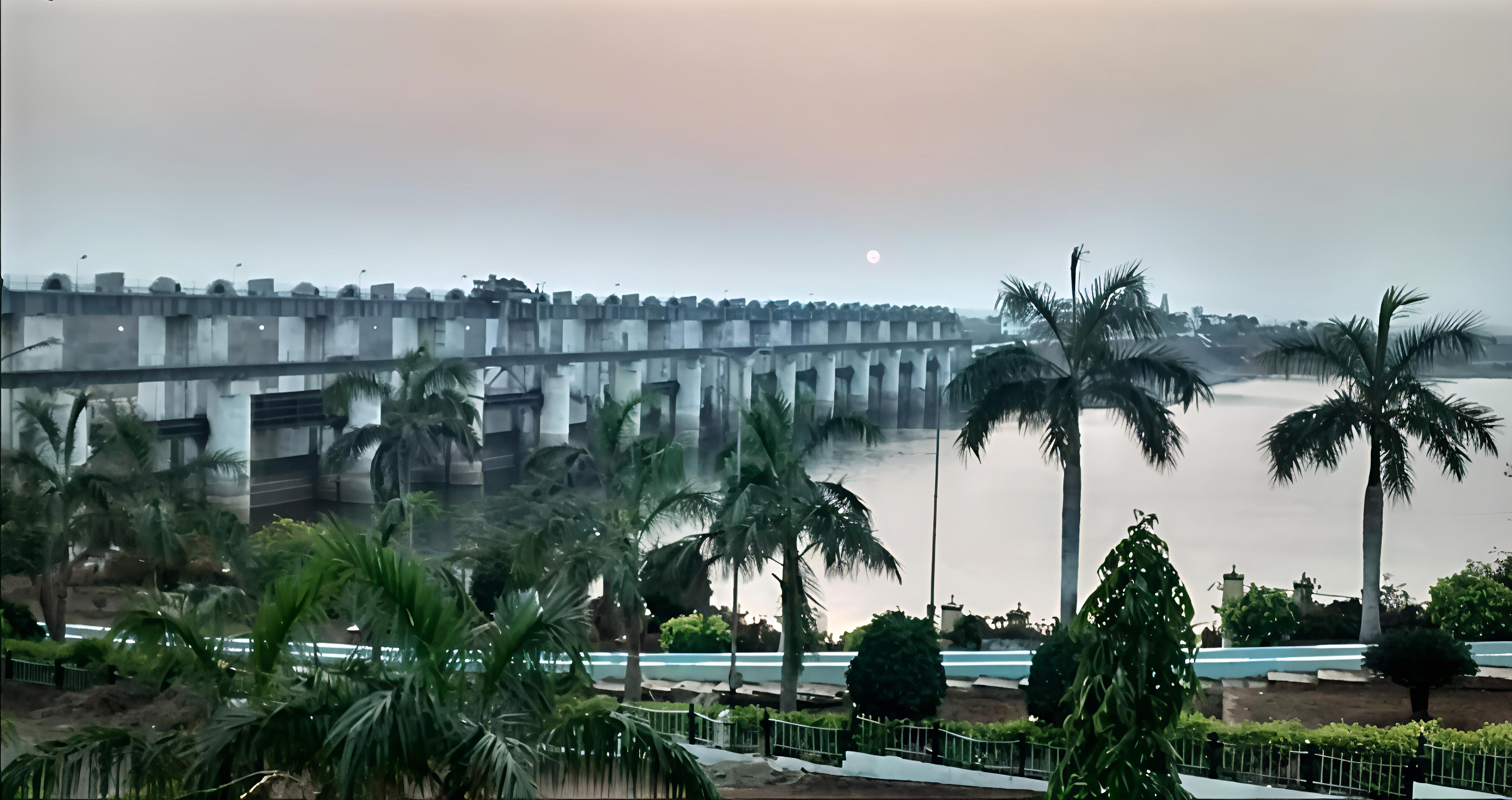
- Mallavaram dam on Gundlakamma river near Ongole

- Location of reservoir
- Official name: Kandula Obula Reddy Gundlakamma Reservoir
- Country: India
- Location: Mallavaram, Prakasam district, Andhra Pradesh
- Coordinates: 15.6617°N 79.9867°E
- Purpose: Irrigation & Drinking water
- Status: Active
- Construction began: 2006
- Opening date: 2008
- Owner: Government of Andhra Pradesh

Dam and spillways
- Type of dam: Dam
- Impounds: Gundlakamma
- Length: 5,699 m (18,698 ft)

Reservoir
- Creates: Kandula Obula Reddy Gundlakamma Reservoir
- Total capacity: 3.859 Tmcft
- Website irrigationap.cgg.gov.in/wrd/static/approjects/Kandula.html

Gundlakamma Reservoir Project (officially Kandula Obula Reddy Gundlakamma Reservoir Project) is an irrigation project across the Gundlakamma river located in Prakasam district in Andhra Pradesh, India. The dam has 3.859 billion cubic feet of live storage capacity.

At the time of its inauguration in 2008, only 15,000 acres out of the total envisaged area of 80,000 could be irrigated due to issues in land acquisition for constructing canals. As of 2024 land acquisition issues continue to dog the project preventing full utilisation, as some of the affected farmers did not agree to the compensation fixed by the government.

== Design ==
Gundlakamma Reservoir Project overlay

It is planned to use 12.845 TMC of water through filling the reservoir 6 times during the monsoon season to provide irrigation facilities to 62,368 acres in Khariff and 80,060 acres in Rabi seasons in 6 mandals of Prasakam district. It is also planned to provide drinking water facility to 256,000 people in 43 villages enroute canals and to Ongole town.

The reservoir consists of earthen dam with a length of 5.699 km, 227 meters long spillway with 15 vertical gates. The crest level of gates is +16.38 M for a maximum flood discharge of 2,72,000 cusecs. Right canal with take off at 3.785 Km of right bund for a length of 27.26 Km feeds an ayacut of 28,000 acres. Left canal with take off at 0.9 Km of left bund for a length of 21.975 km feeds an ayacut of 52,060 acres.

== Land acquisition issues ==
As of 2024 land acquisition issues continue to dog the project preventing full utilisation, as some of the affected farmers did not agree to the compensation fixed by the government.

== Maintenance ==
Two crest gates of the reservoir developed leaks in 2023, leading to loss of water and also damage to ayacut crops, as water was released suddenly to manage the crisis.
