= Chandavaram Buddhist site =

Archaeological site in Andhra Pradesh, India

- Chandavaram excavation site
- Location on Andhra Pradesh map
- Interactive map of Chandavaram Buddhist site
- 15°55′58.5156″N 79°25′40.2240″E
- Type: Buddhist excavation site
- Cultures: Buddhist
- Location: Chandavaram village
- Region: Andhra Pradesh

History
- Built: 2 century BCE to 2 century CE
- Built by: Satavahana dynasty

Site notes
- Material: Limestone
- Excavation dates: 1964
- Archaeologists: Veluri Venkata Krishna Sastry
- Condition: Restored
- Owner: Public
- Public access: Yes

Chandavaram Buddhist site is an ancient Indian Buddhist site in Chandavaram village in Prakasam district in the Indian state of Andhra Pradesh. Situated on the bank of Gundlakamma River, the site is 10 kilometres (6.2 mi) northwest of Donakonda railway station. The Chandavaram Buddhist site was built between the 2nd century BCE and the 2nd century CE during the Satavahana dynasty and was discovered by Veluri Venkata Krishna Sastry in 1964.

Much of the sculpture has been removed from the site, and the best collection is in the Telangana State Archaeology Museum, Hyderabad. Some of the best pieces from the site museum have been stolen in recent decades. It is in the Amaravati style.

== History ==
The first of its kind in the state of Andhra Pradesh, the Chandavaram Buddhist site was constructed between the 2nd century BCE and the 2nd century CE. It was an active center for Buddhist religious activities, and was also inhabited at the time. The age of the site was determined by the carbon dating of artifacts discovered during excavation. The sculptural panels in the site are of the Amaravati school which also suggests that the site was built between the 2nd century BCE and the 2nd century CE. The Chandavaram Buddhist site was used as a resting place by Buddhist monks travelling from Kashi to Kanchi. Discovered in 1964, the site was constructed during the Satavahana dynasty. Ayaka pillars are absent from the site, indicating that the Hinayana form of Buddhism was prevalent in Chandavaram. The site houses a double terraced Maha Stupa on a hilltop which is next in importance only to Sanchi Stupa. The hill on which the Maha Stupa is located is called Singarakonda.

== Construction and structure ==
360 degree view of Chadvaram site

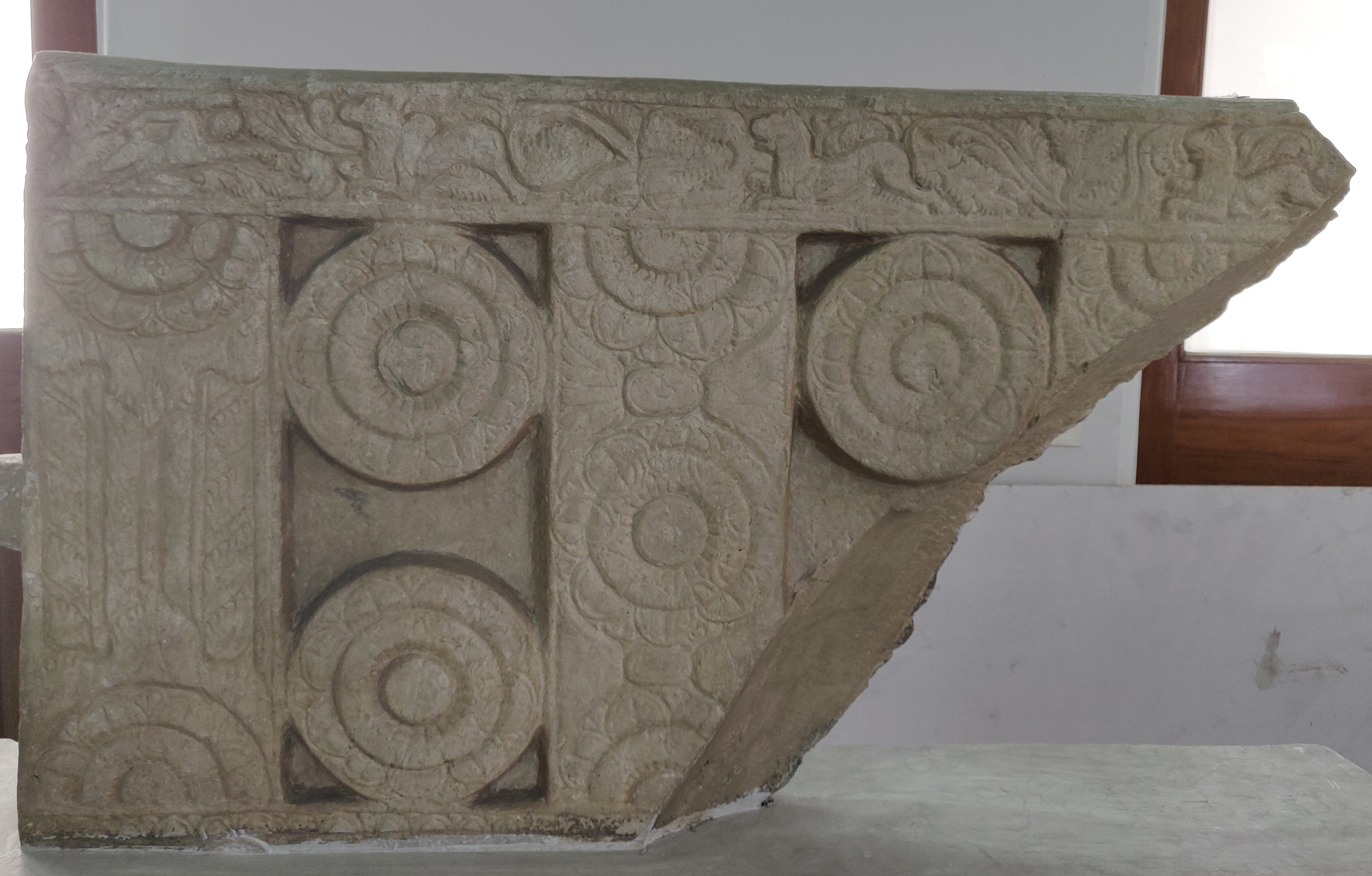
Section of railing in the Telangana State Archaeology Museum

Constructed during the Satavahana dynasty, the Chandavaram Buddhist site houses a double terraced main stupa built on an elevated platform situated on a hilltop. The MahaStupa exhibits the characteristics of stupas built under the Hinayana form of Buddhism. The main dome (MahaStupa) is 120 feet (37 m) in circumference and 30 feet (9.1 m) high. It has carved panels that portray the Dharmachakra (the wheel of Dharma, one of the Ashtamangala of Indian religions such as Hinduism, Jainism and Buddhism). Apart from the main stupa, the site also houses several viharas, Brahmi inscriptions and other stupas. In the MahaStupa, there is a chaitya which is 1.6 metres (5.2 ft) high and 60 centimetres (2.0 ft) wide.

The MahaStupa resembles the Dharmarajika stupa in Taxila, Pakistan. The panels on the main stupa are made of limestone. The panels and the drum sections of the main stupa exhibit the Buddha footprint, stupas, Bodhi trees and also narratives in the form of Jataka tales along with other stories. Since 1964, the Chandavaram Buddhist site has been excavated four times, and fifteen regular-sized and approximately one hundred small stupas have been discovered. The site comprises the following:

- Main Stupa (MahaStupa)
- Maha Chaitya
- Museum
- Silamandapa
- Vihara
- Votive Stupas

== Proposed statue of Buddha ==
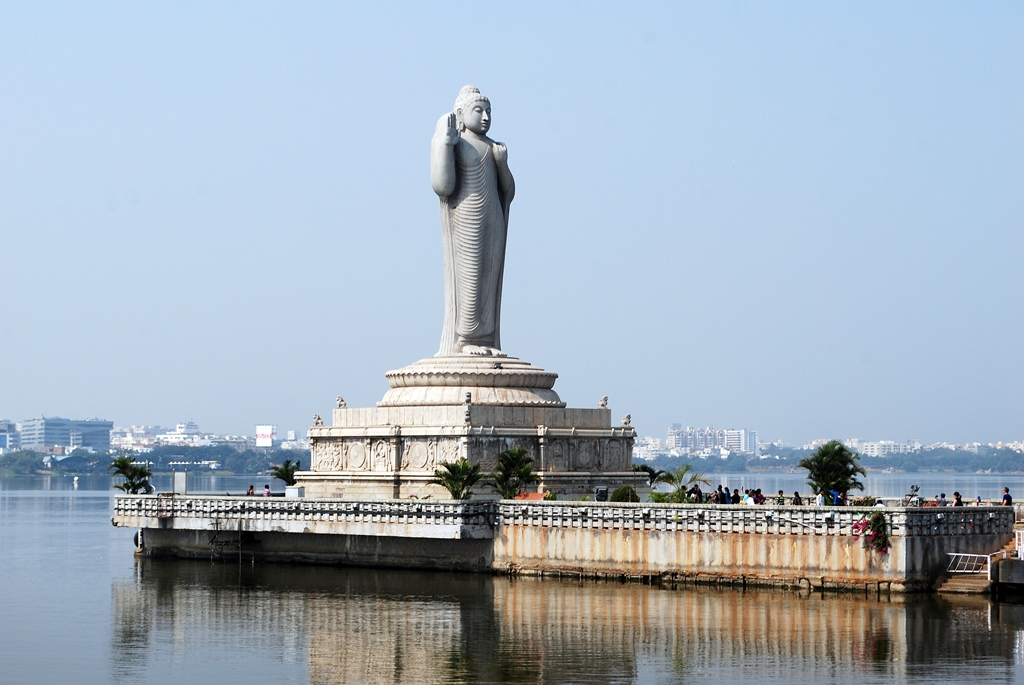
Buddha statue, now at the Hussain Sagar, Hyderabad.

In 1985, a project called the "Buddha Poornima Project" was proposed. Under this project, the world's tallest standing monolith statue of Buddha was to be erected on the site. Made out of granite, the statue was carved by 200 sculptors in two years and on completion it weighed 440 tonnes with an overall height of 17 metres (56 ft). However, the Buddha statue was transported to city of Hyderabad in 1988 instead, where it was erected in 1992 in the Hussain sagar lake, where it stands today.

== Archeological finds ==
One MahaStupa, fifteen regular-sized and approximately one hundred small Stupas have been discovered in the Chandavaram Buddhist site. Apart from the Maha Chaitya, Silamandapa, Vihara and the Votive Stupas, more than two dozen "Buddhist slabs" (decorated with designs and inscriptions) have also been discovered.

== Thefts from museum ==
Robberies of artefacts has been reported at the Chandavaram Buddhist site since the year 2000. In Oct 2000, two 9 feet (2.7 m) long panels, with engravings of the Bodhi tree and of the Chaitra were uprooted from a cement platform and stolen from the site's museum. In February 2001, three pillars, each measuring 9 feet (2.7 m) long and including one in which the Buddha was represented as fire were stolen. In March 2001, three more ornate pillars and a lotus medallion were stolen.

== Geographic location ==
=== Gallery ===
All Telangana State Archaeology Museum

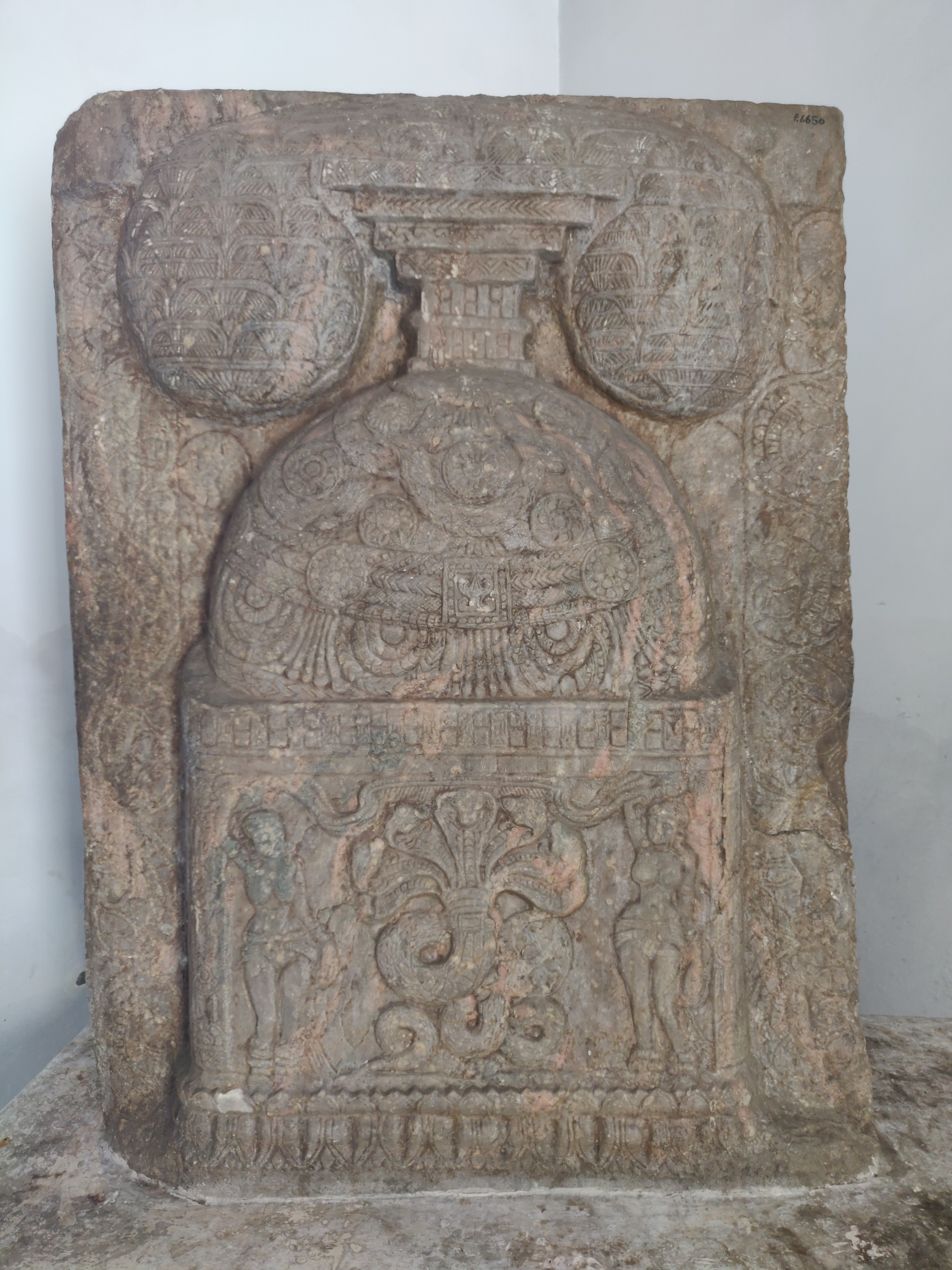
Drum panel of the chaitya with model stupa depicting the worship of Mucalinda the nagaraja, before 300

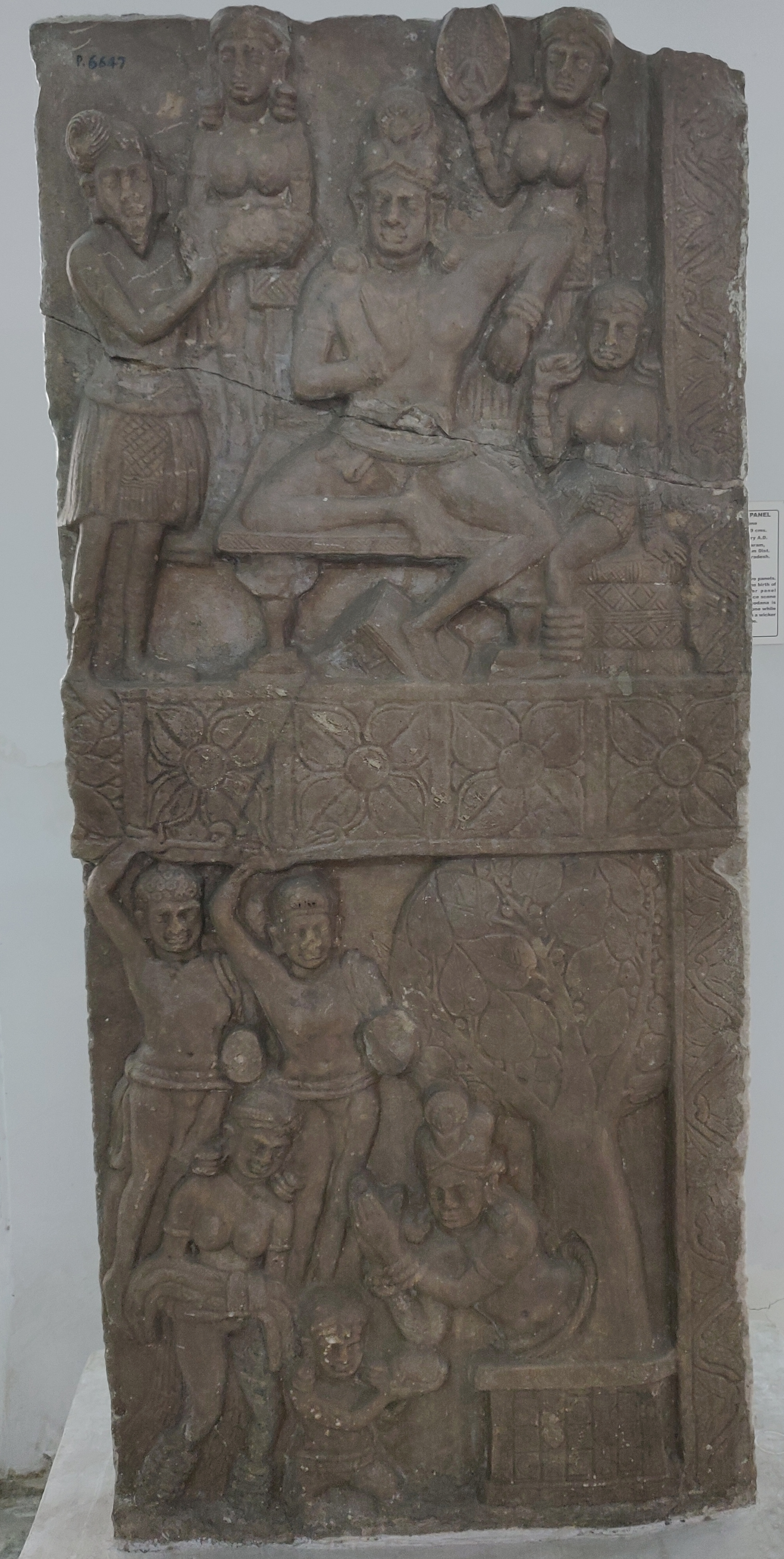
Scenes from the life of Buddha; below, his birth. Before 100

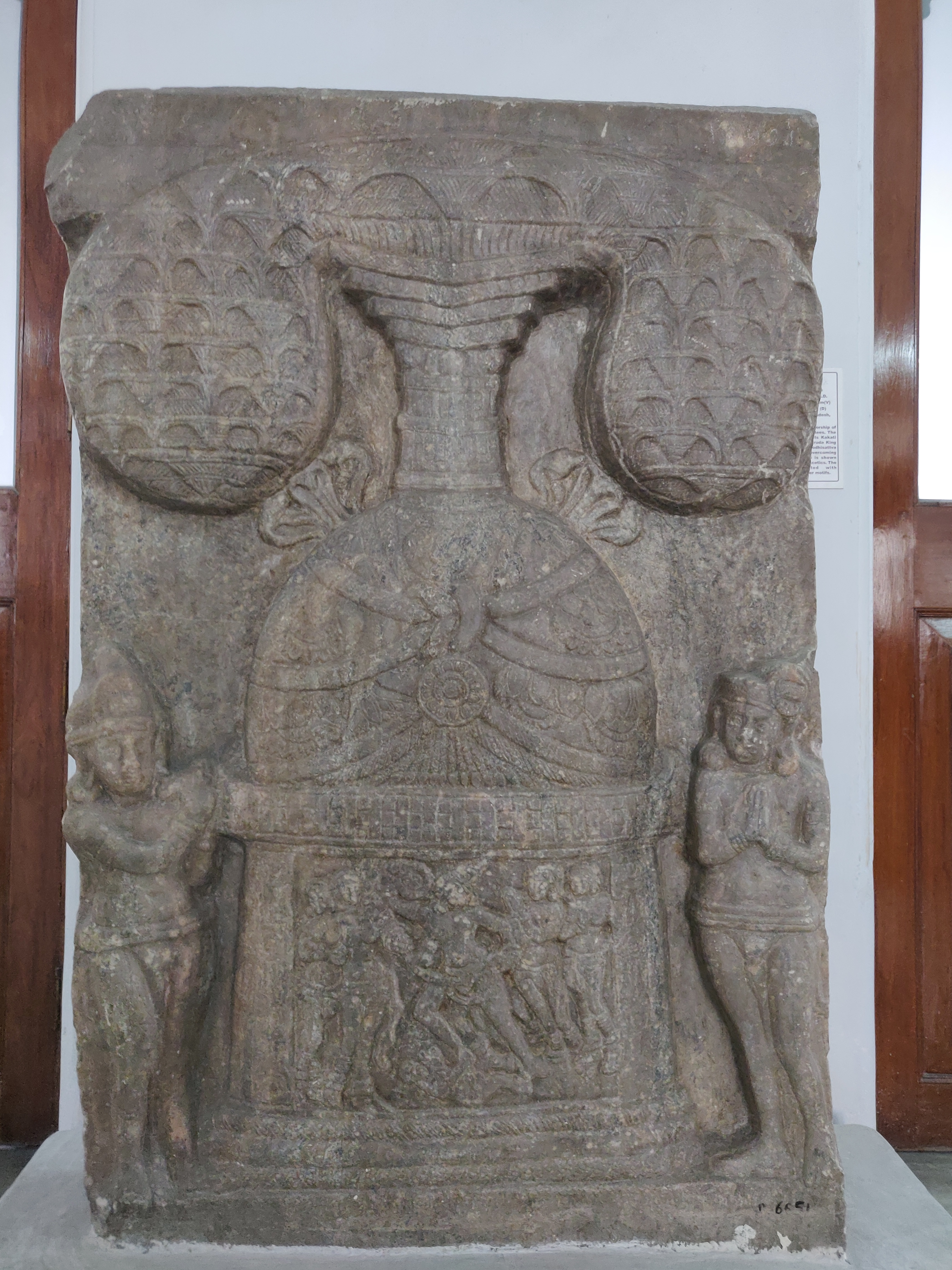
Worship of a stupa, which has a Jataka scene. Before 100

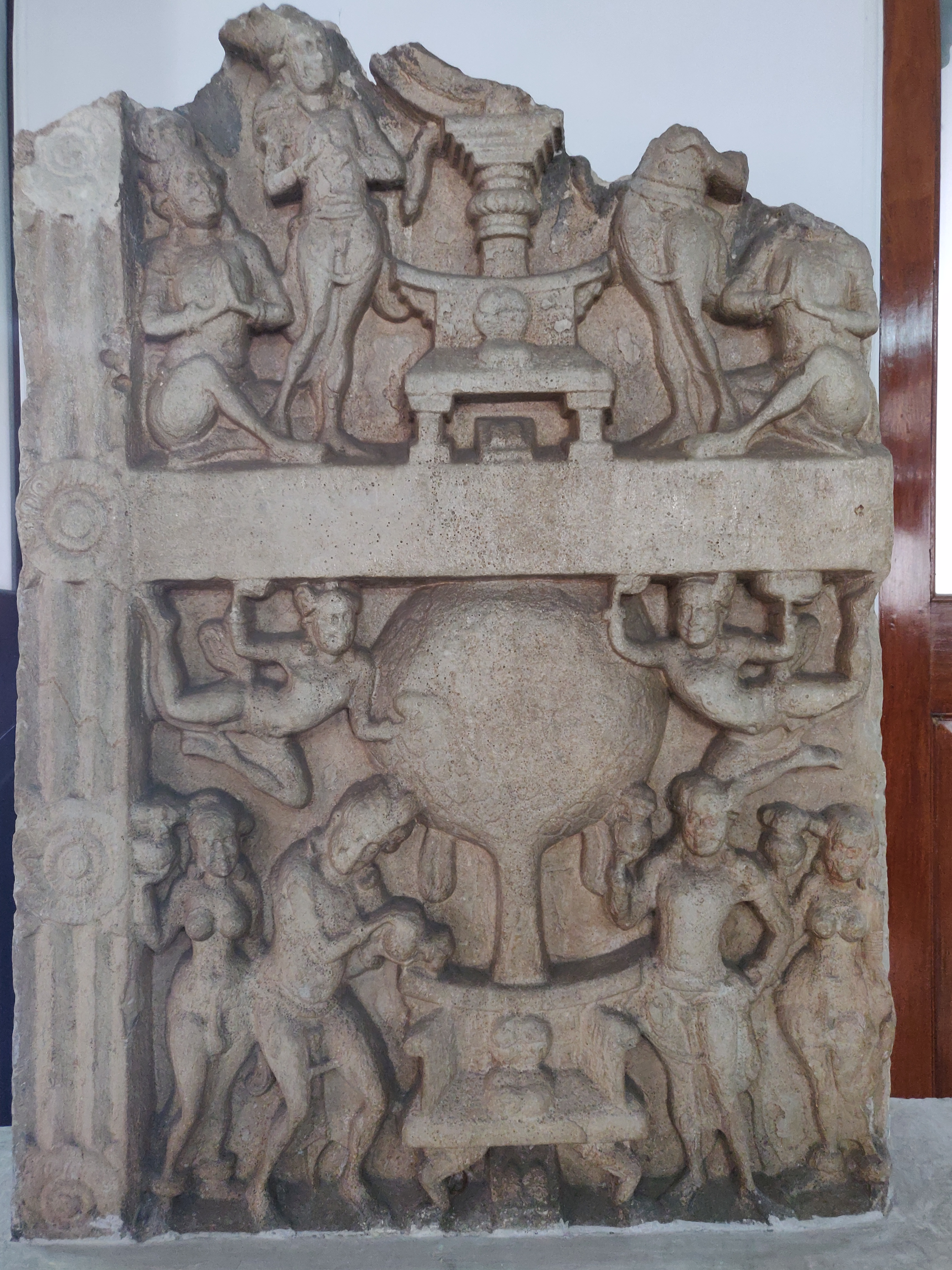
Worship of thrones with dharmachakra (above) and Bodhi tree (below), 2nd century
