= Gundlakamma River =

River in Andhra Pradesh, India

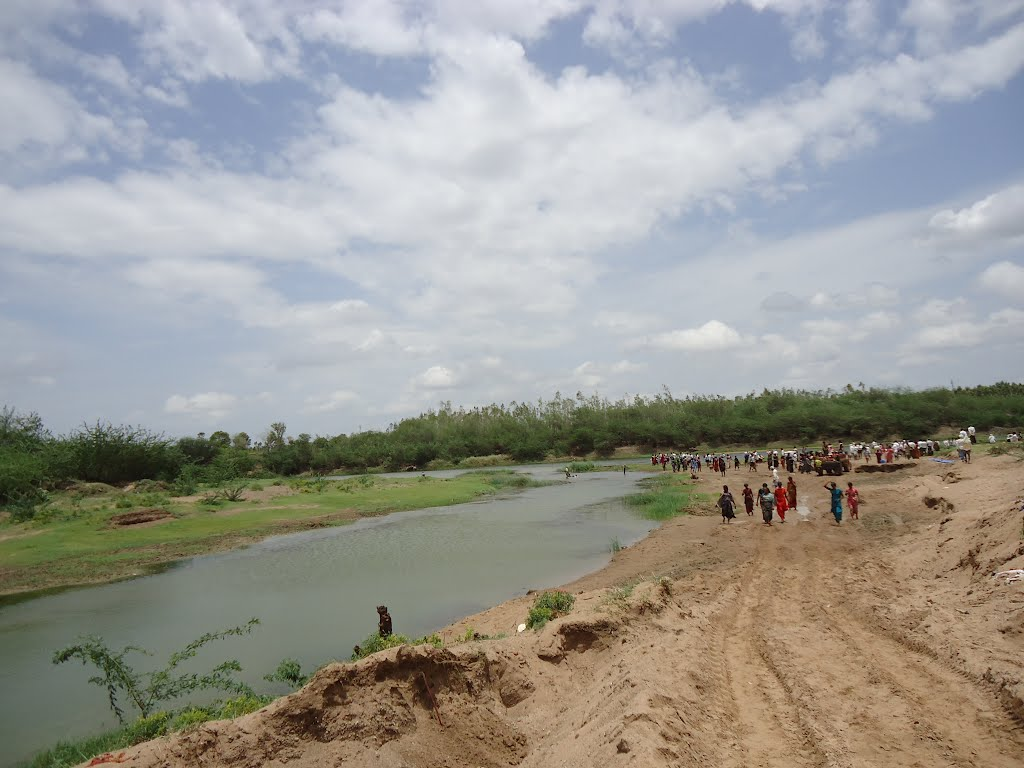
- Gundlakamma near Rachavaripalem

- Location of the mouth of the river

Location
- Country: India
- State: Andhra Pradesh
- Region: South India

Physical characteristics
- Source
  - location: Iskagundam village in Kurnool district, near Gundla Brahmeswaram
  - coordinates: 15°38′N 78°47′E
  - elevation: 600 m (2,000 ft)
- Mouth: Bay Of Bengal
  - location: Prakasam district, Andhra Pradesh, India
  - coordinates: 15.5430°N 80.2290°E
  - elevation: 800 m (2,600 ft) - 0 m (0 ft)

The Gundlakamma River is a seasonal waterway that flows through the east-central part of the state of Andhra Pradesh, India. It arises in the Nallamala Hills, an offshoot of the Eastern Ghats. Gundlakamma is the largest of all the rivers that originate from the Nallamalla Hills.

== Geography ==
Gundlakamma River in thick blue

It arises in the Nallamala Hills, an offshoot of the Eastern Ghats. Its main headwaters lie some 6 kilometers from the village of Ardhaveedu, Markapuram district at an altitude of 425 m. above sea level. Numerous mountain streams join it as it descends down the thickly forested hills through a series of curves and tight bends. It follows a north-easterly direction and enters the plains near Cumbum, after flowing through a town named after it. The river then flows past the town of Markapur and towards the Coromandel Coast through Addanki town. It finally enters the Bay of Bengal, some 19 km east of Ongole after covering a distance of 225 km. Gundlakamma is the largest of all the rivers that originate from the Nallamalla Hills.

== Reservoirs ==
=== Cumbum lake ===
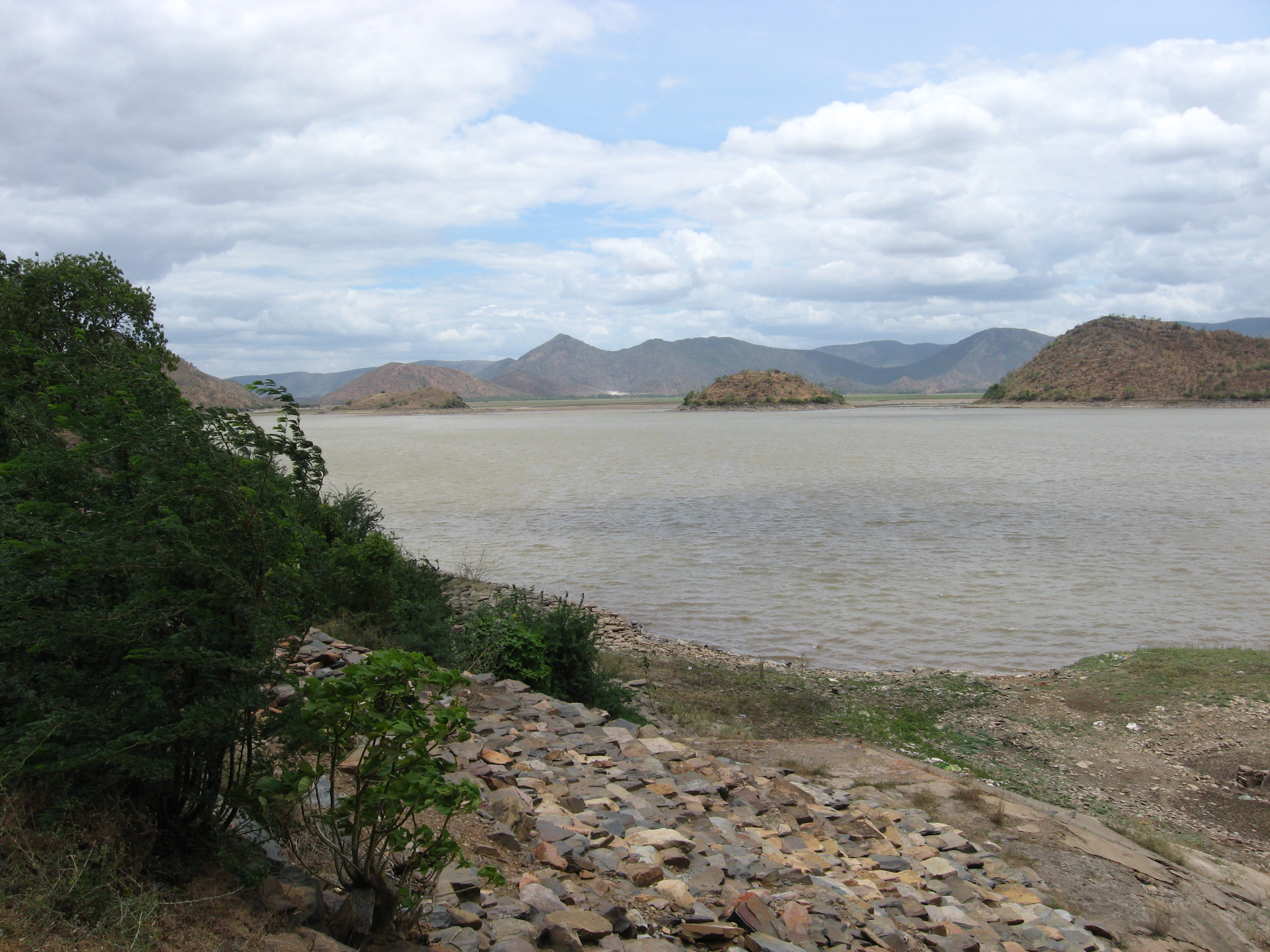
Cumbum lake

A 15th-century dam built by the Gajapati kings straddles the river on its entry into the plains. It is an earthen dam that plugs the river flows through. Called the Cumbum Dam, it is 57 feet (17 m) high, has a drainage area of 430 square miles (1,100 km^{2}) and a capacity of 3,696,000,000 cubic feet (105,000,000 m^{3}).

Veligonda Project is under construction to connect the river basin with the adjacent Krishna River basin by a 20 km long tunnel from the Srisailam reservoir. Construction of a 40 Tmcft capacity storage reservoir is also part of this project. Once this project is completed, the reliability of water supply to all the irrigation projects in the river basin would enhance vastly.

=== Gundlakamma Reservoir Project ===
A modern dam called Gundlakamma Reservoir Project too has been constructed across the river at Mallavaram, Prakasam District. Some 80 feet (24 m) high, this dam has a capacity of 3.80 billion cubic feet (110,000,000 m^{3}) and can irrigate 80,600 acres (330 km^{2}) of land. It will also provide drinking water for the 250,000 people living in Ongole and its surrounding villages. The lower part of the river basin is irrigated by Krishna river water through Nagarjuna Sagar right bank canal.

=== Bridges ===
The Guntur–Guntakal railway track of the Guntur railway division crosses the river over the embankment at Cumbum as well as at two other places before it. The Vijayawada–Chennai mainline of the same railway crosses the river a few kilometres before its mouth (Karavadi Village). Near the same place, National Highway 5 also spans the river at Vellampalli village.

== Floods ==
Though a tamed river generally, the heavy monsoonal rains in 2001 caused the river to burst its banks and flood areas along its course. About 15 people were washed away by its gushing waters in October 2001.

== Culture ==
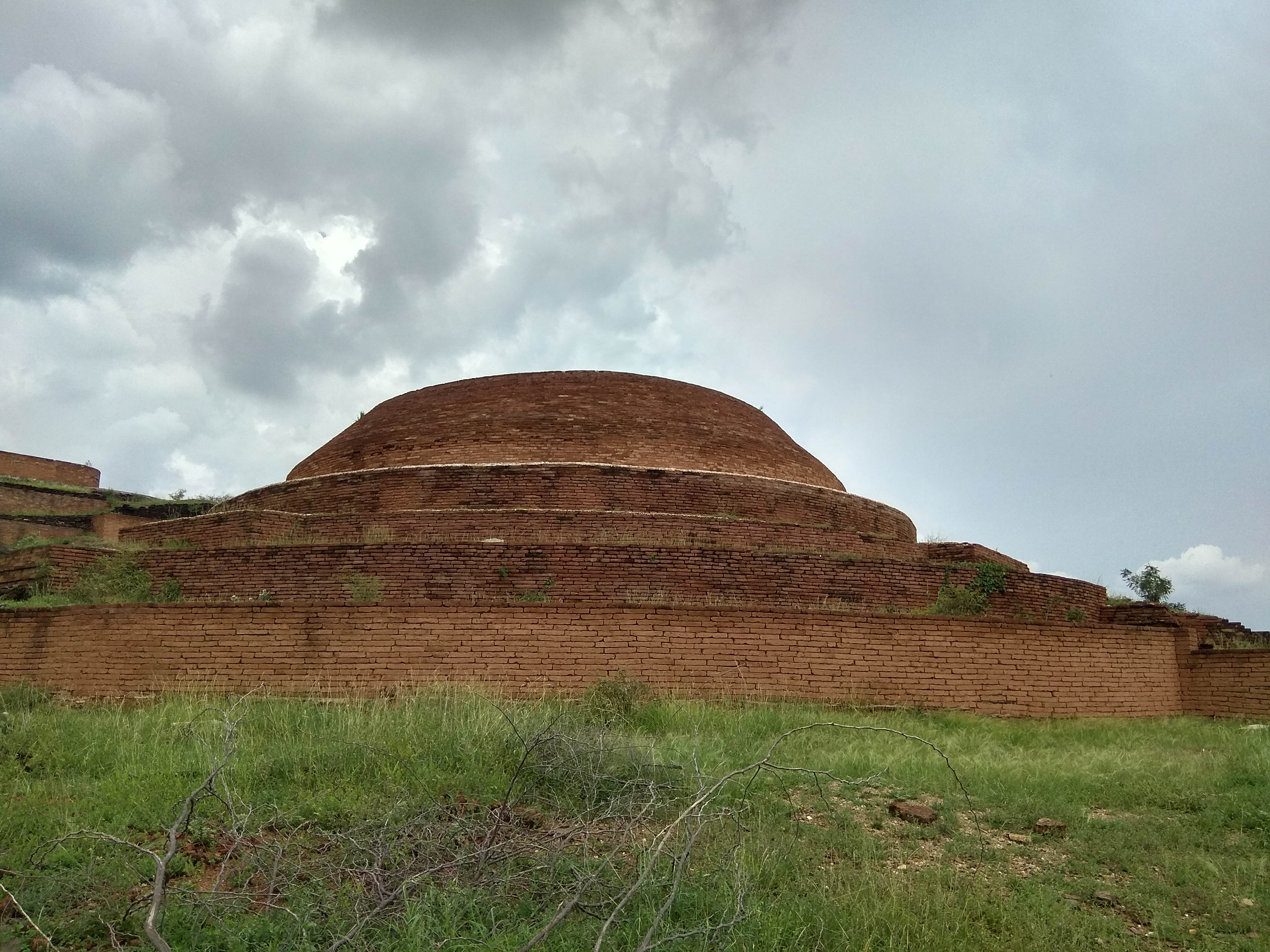
Chandavaram Buddhist stupa near Gundlakamma river, which flourished during 2nd century CE)

Gundlakamma river served as an important water way transport during 2nd century BC - 2nd century CE along Buddhist sites like Chandavaram, Dupadu, Chejarla, Grandhasiri, Kanuparti, Uppugundur and Motupalli of Andhra Pradesh.

Reddi kingdom was founded with Addanki as its capital by Prolaya Vema in 1325 AD. It was ruled till 1355 AD by him and his son Anavotha reddy, after which the capital was shifted to Kondaveedu.

Few Buddhist sites near Gundlakamma River: 1-Dupadu,2- Chandavaram, 3-Kanuparti, 4-Motupalli

== Tourism ==
Gundla Brahmeswara Sanctuary is located in the river basin.
