= Mallavaram =

- Village
- Interactive map of Mallavaram
- Location in Andhra Pradesh, India Mallavaram (India)
- Coordinates: 15.4760942°N 79.3756755°E
- Country: India
- State: Andhra Pradesh
- District: Markapuram

Population (2011)
  - Total: 1,306

Languages
  - Official: Telugu
- Time zone: UTC+5:30 (IST)
- Vehicle registration: AP

Mallavaram is a village in Podili mandal, located in Markapuram district of the Indian state of Andhra Pradesh.
