= Telangana State Archaeology Museum =

Telangana State Archeology Museum
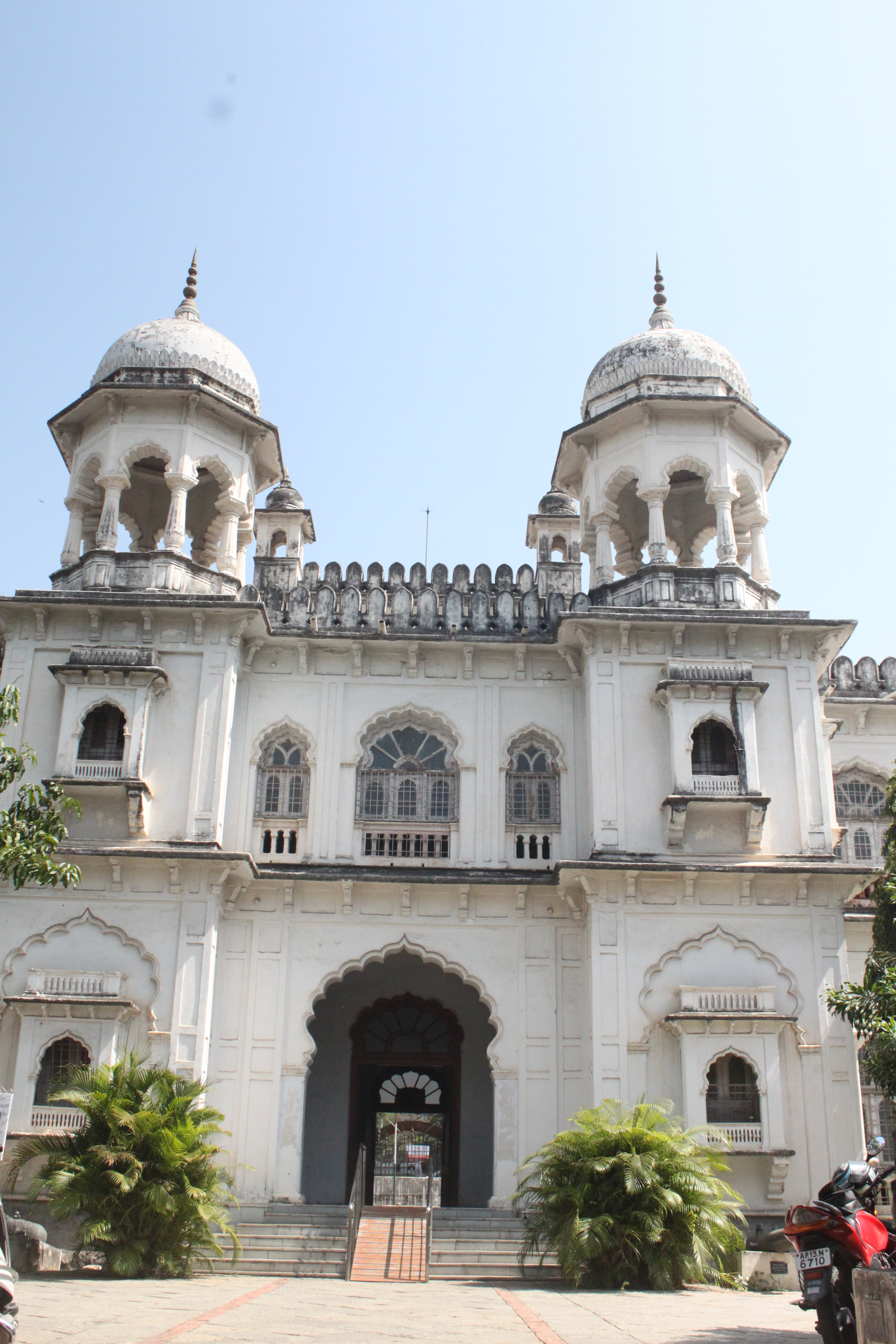
- The museum building

- Location within Hyderabad Location within Telangana Location within India
- Former names: Hyderabad Museum; Andhra Pradesh State Museum; Dr Y. S. Rajasekhara Reddy State Museum
- Established: March 1931, 31; 95 years ago
- Location: Public Gardens, Nampally, Hyderabad, Telangana, India
- Coordinates: 17.39925017927321°N 78.47031633170265°E
- Type: archaeological museum
- Key holdings: Egyptian mummy, numismatics
- Founder: Mir Osman Ali Khan
- Public transit access: Nampally Metro Station
- Parking: On site

Telangana State Archaeology Museum or Hyderabad Museum is a museum located in Hyderabad, India. It is the oldest museum in Hyderabad.

== History ==
Henry Cousens is the first person to have recorded carrying out archaeological explorations in Hyderabad State in 19th century. Department of Archaeology was established in 1914. Telangana State Archaeology Museum then known as Hyderabad Museum was first established in 1927. The museum was then located at Town Hall where today State Assembly is located. The museum was later shifted to the present building constructed by the seventh Nizam and in 1930 he named it as Hyderabad Museum and it was formally inaugurated by the Nizam on 31 March 1931.

The museum was renamed as Andhra Pradesh State Archaeology Museum in 1960 after formation of Andhra Pradesh and in 2009 was renamed as Dr Y. S. Rajasekhara Reddy State Museum.

In 2008, a sword belonging to the Nizam and other artifacts were stolen from the museum.

After the bifurcation of Andhra Pradesh and Telangana in 2014, the museum was renamed Telangana State Archeology Museum.

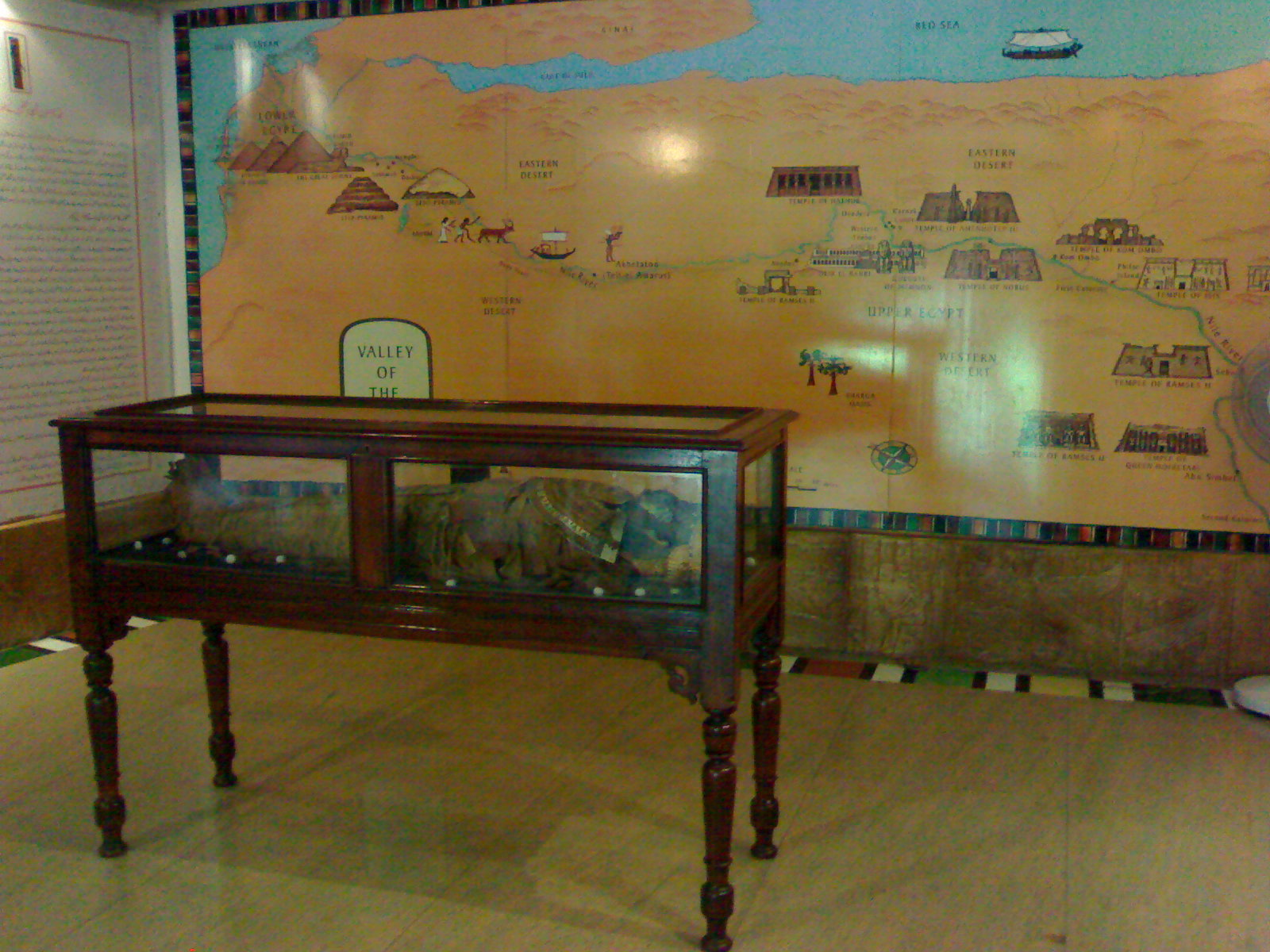
Mummy of daughter of Ptolemy VI Philometor, Ptolemaic Egypt (300-100 BC)

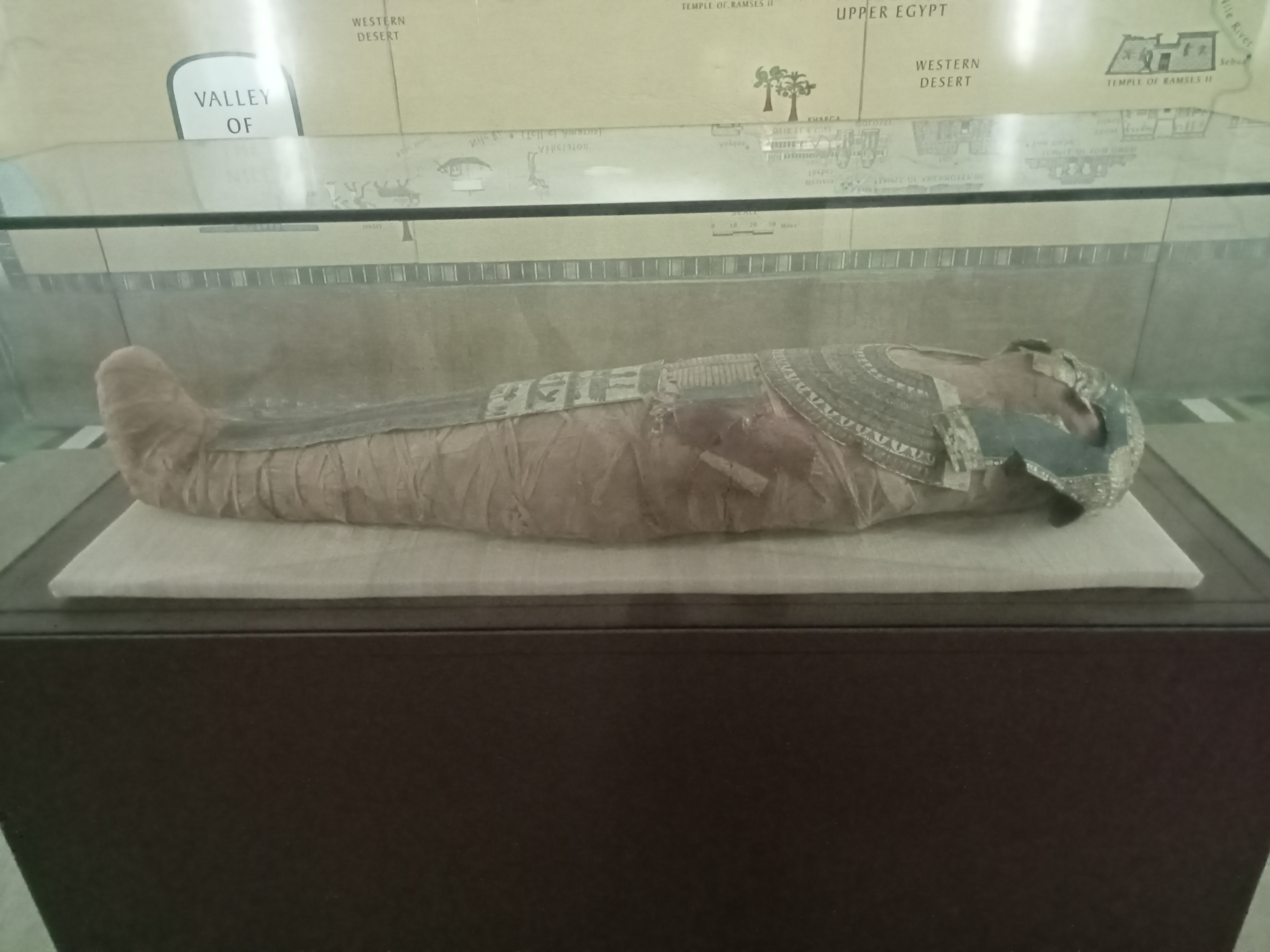
Mummy of daughter of Ptolemy VI Philometor, Ptolemaic Egypt (300-100 BC)

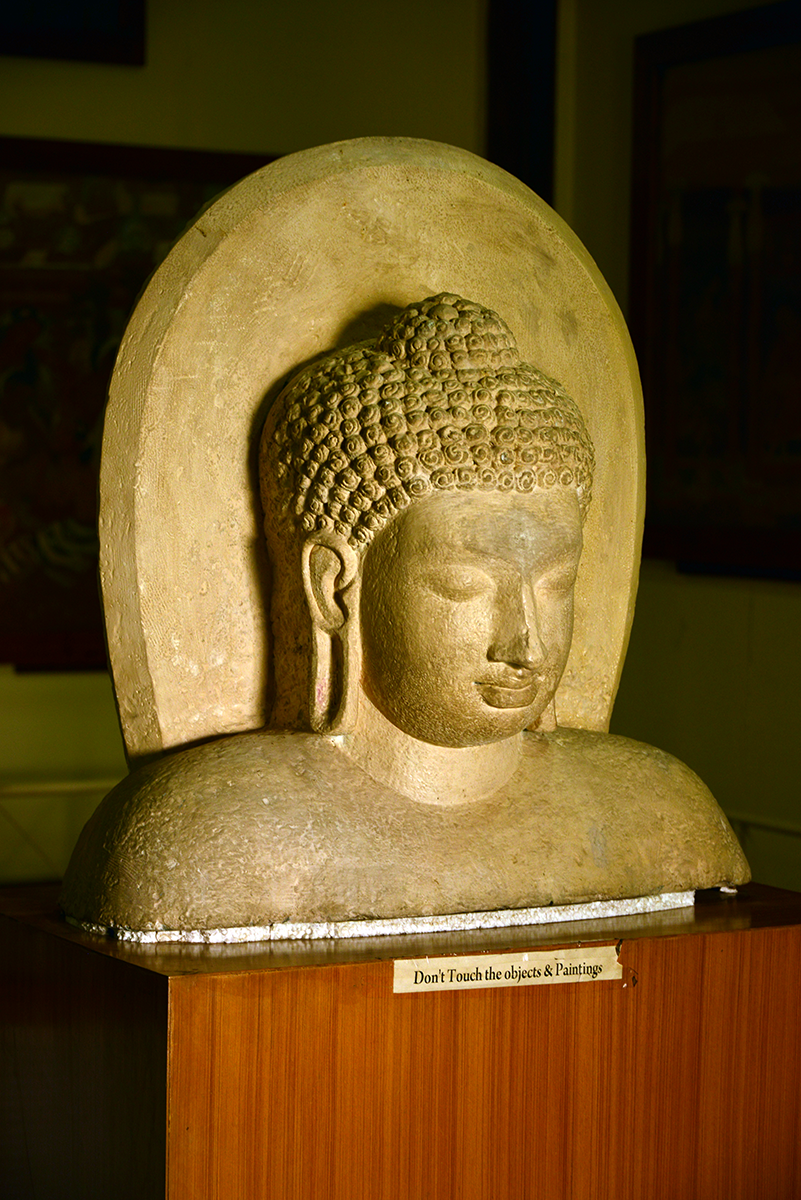
Bust of Buddha in the Telangana State Archeology Museum

== Collection ==
=== Egyptian ===
This museum's most popular attraction is its Egyptian mummy, believed to be of Princess Naishu, daughter of Ptolemy VI Philometor. It was brought in 1930 to Hyderabad by Nasir Nawaz Jung, the son-in-law of Asaf Jah VI. He presented it to the Asaf Jah VII, who donated it to the museum. Jung had reportedly bought it for 1000 pounds. It is one of the six Egyptian mummies in India, the others being in Lucknow, Mumbai, Vadodara, Jaipur, and Kolkata.

The mummy, which previously was deteriorating, was restored in 2016 and placed in an oxygen-free case. This was not entirely successful and is at risk, as of 2025.

=== Indian ===
There is a huge gallery on Buddha dating back to the last century. The museum has a wide variety of archaeological artifacts from the Nizam and Kakatiya dynasty.

=== Bronze Sculpture Gallery ===
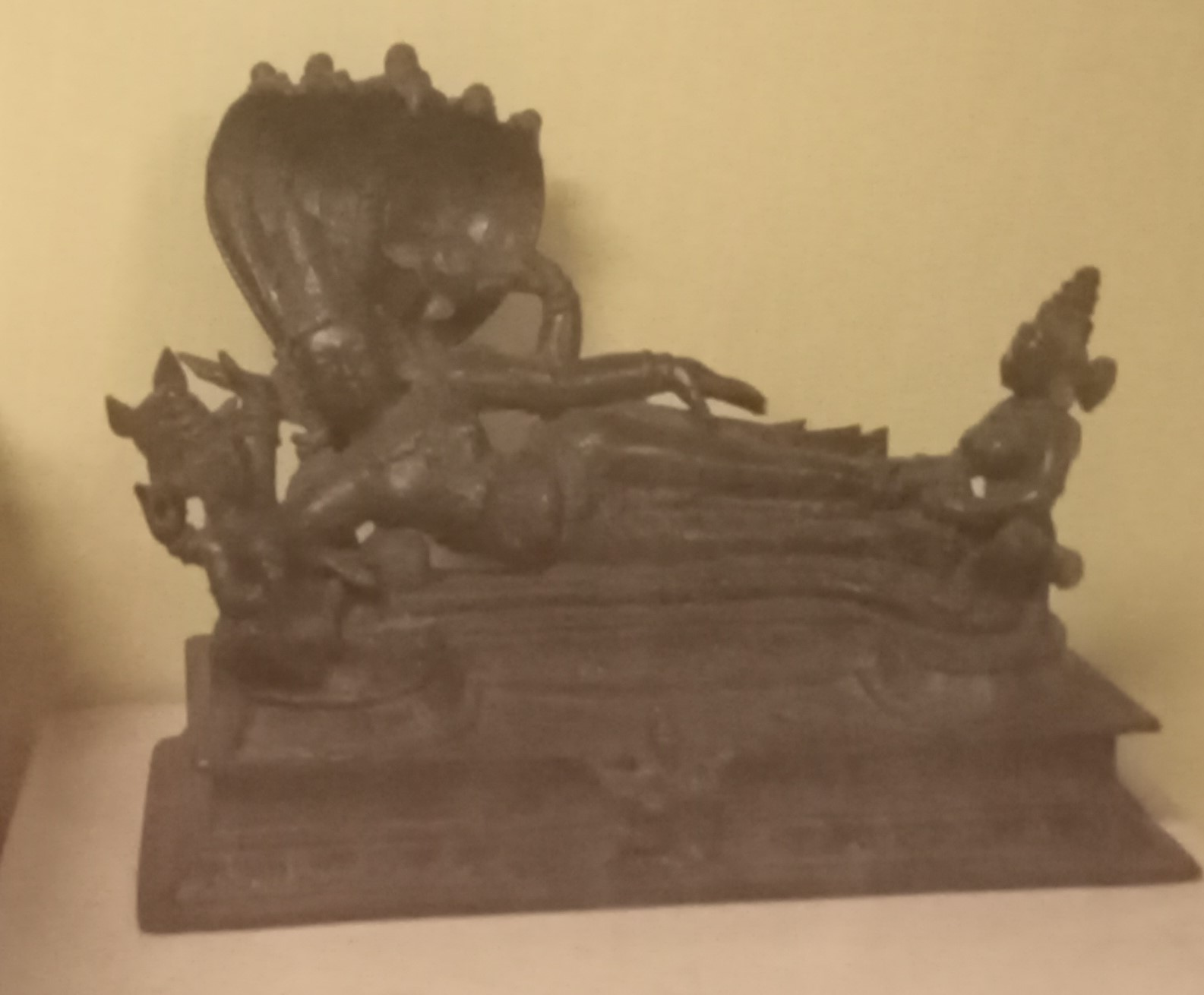
Vishnu - Bhoga Sayana Murthy in Bronze

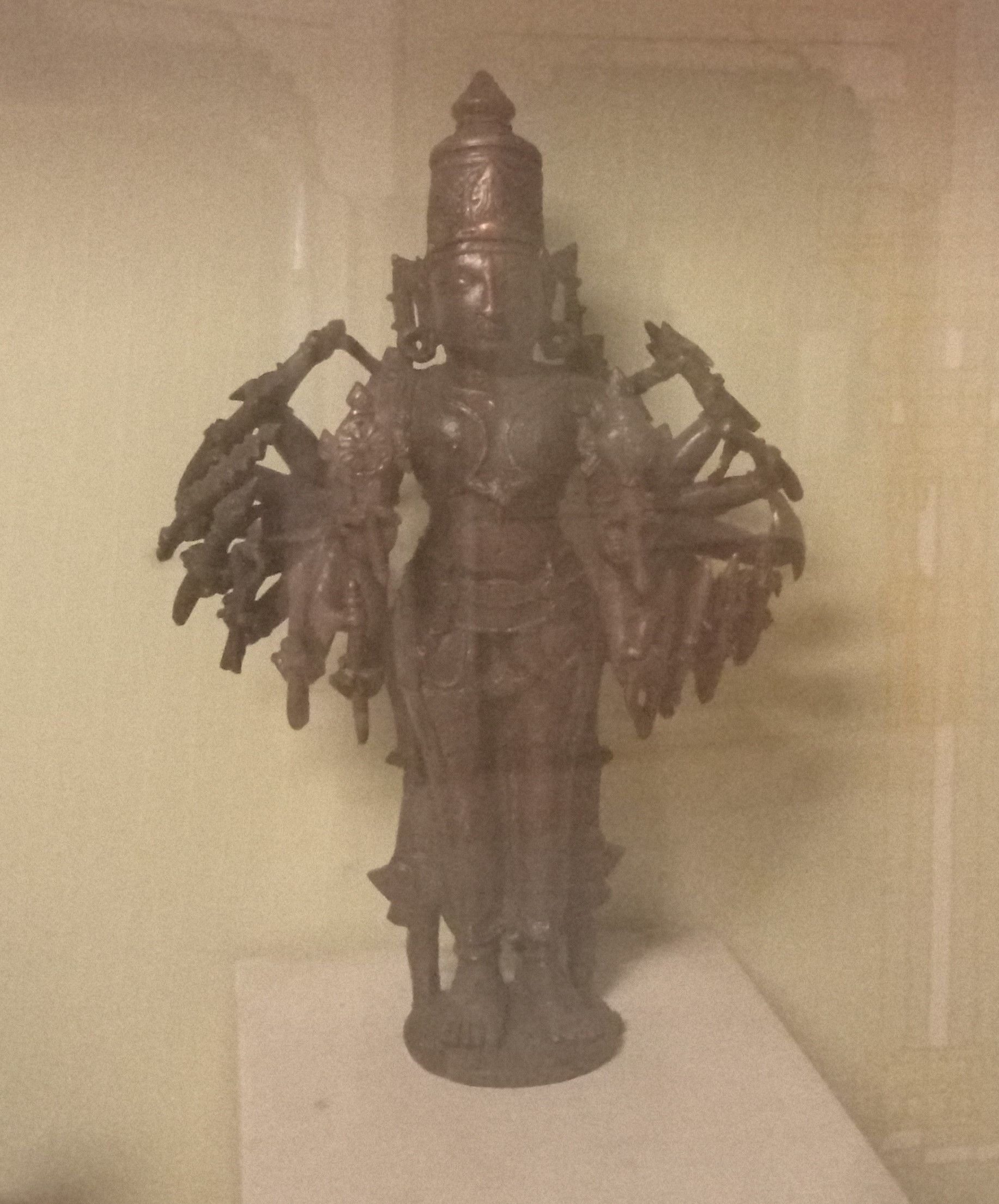
Vishnu - Viswarupa Sandarsana

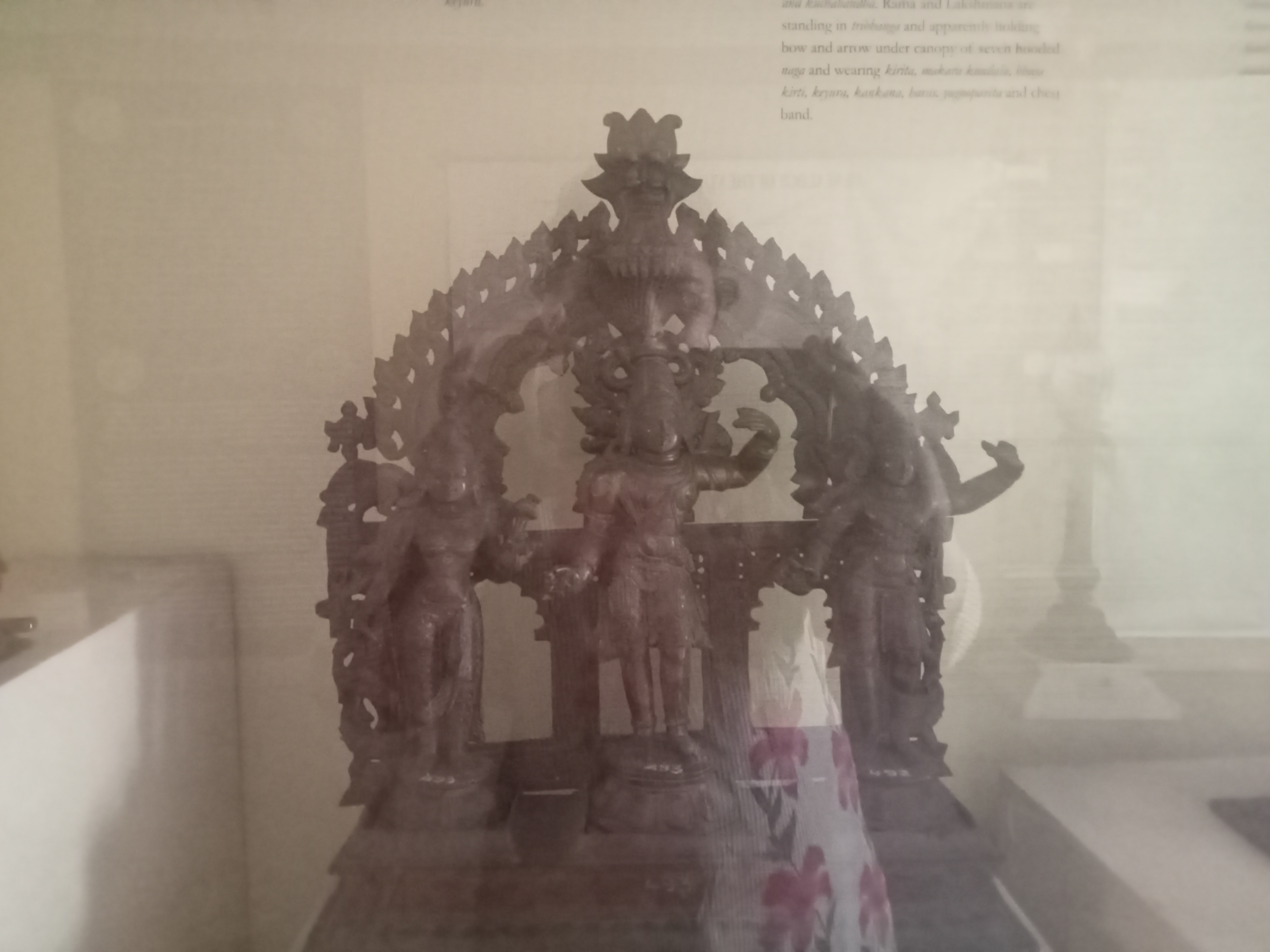
Statue of Sita Ram Lakshman

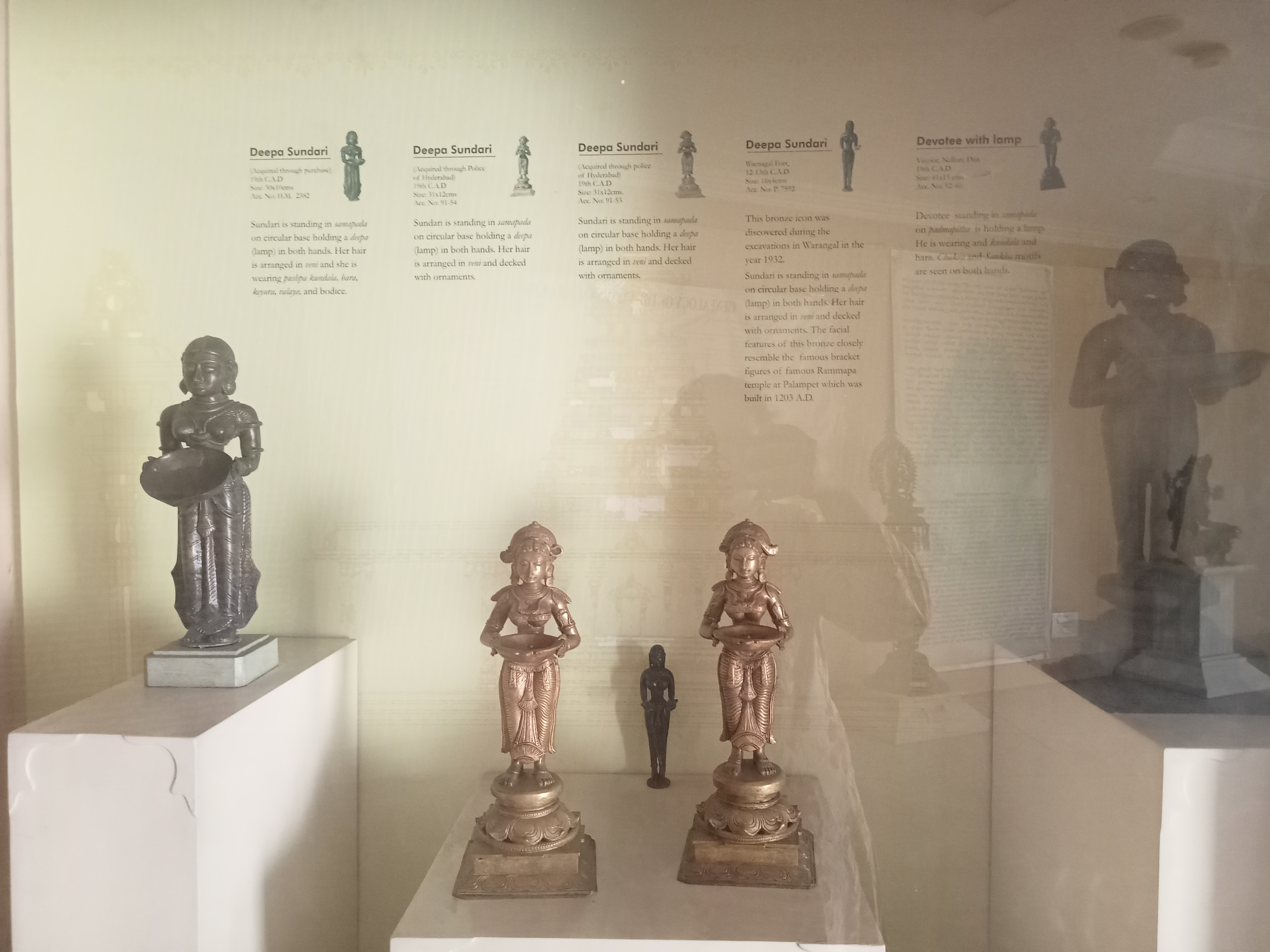
Bronze Deepmala

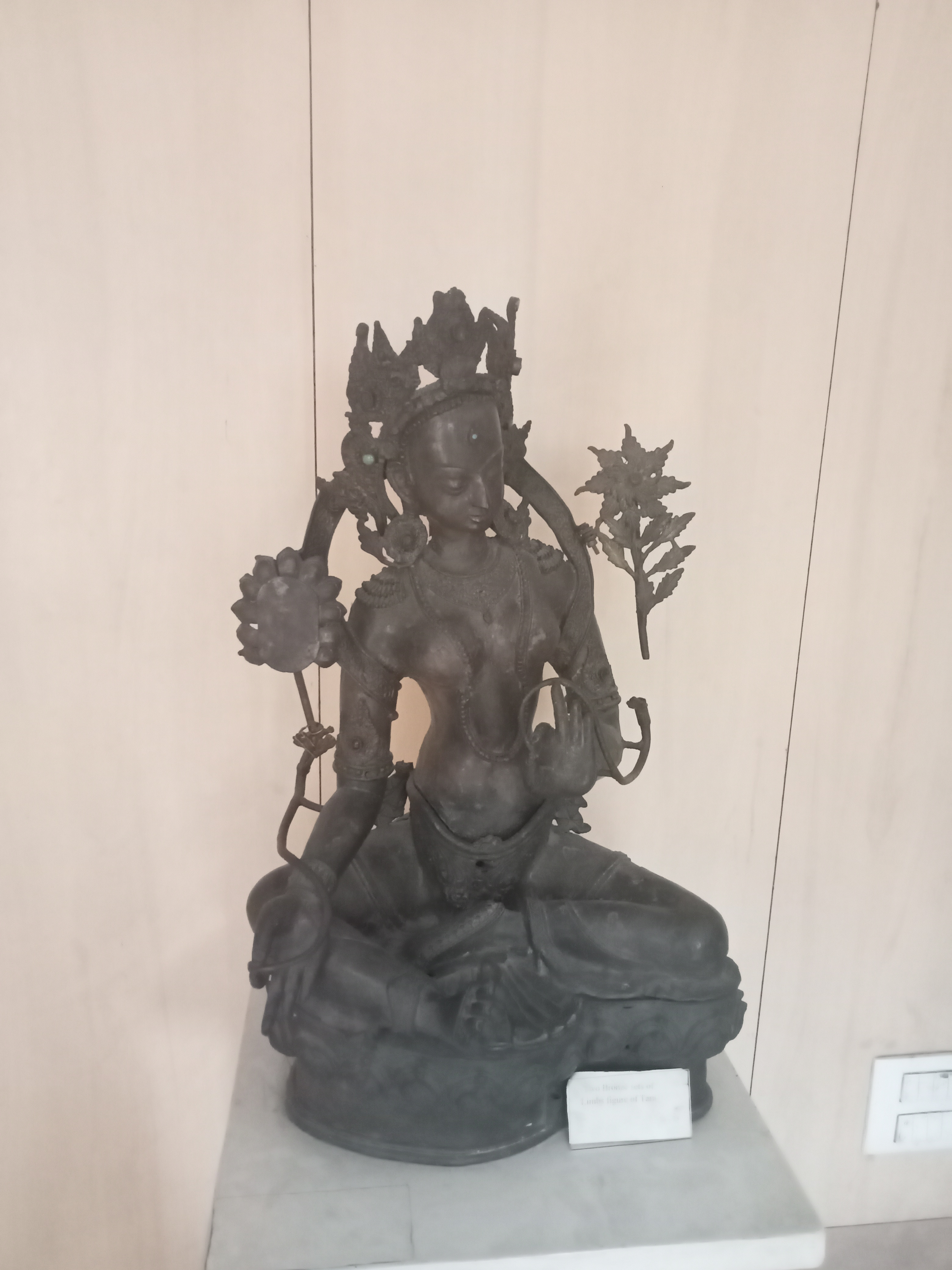
Statue of Tara on throne

=== Ajanta Fresco Gallery ===
The world famous Ajanta Caves in Maharashtra are adorned with beautiful paintings depicting Buddha's doctrine, life events and Jataka stories, the caves were discovered accidentally by British Soldiers in 1819. The paintings are dated from 1st -2nd and 6th-7th century. The paintings have been copied by John Griffiths.

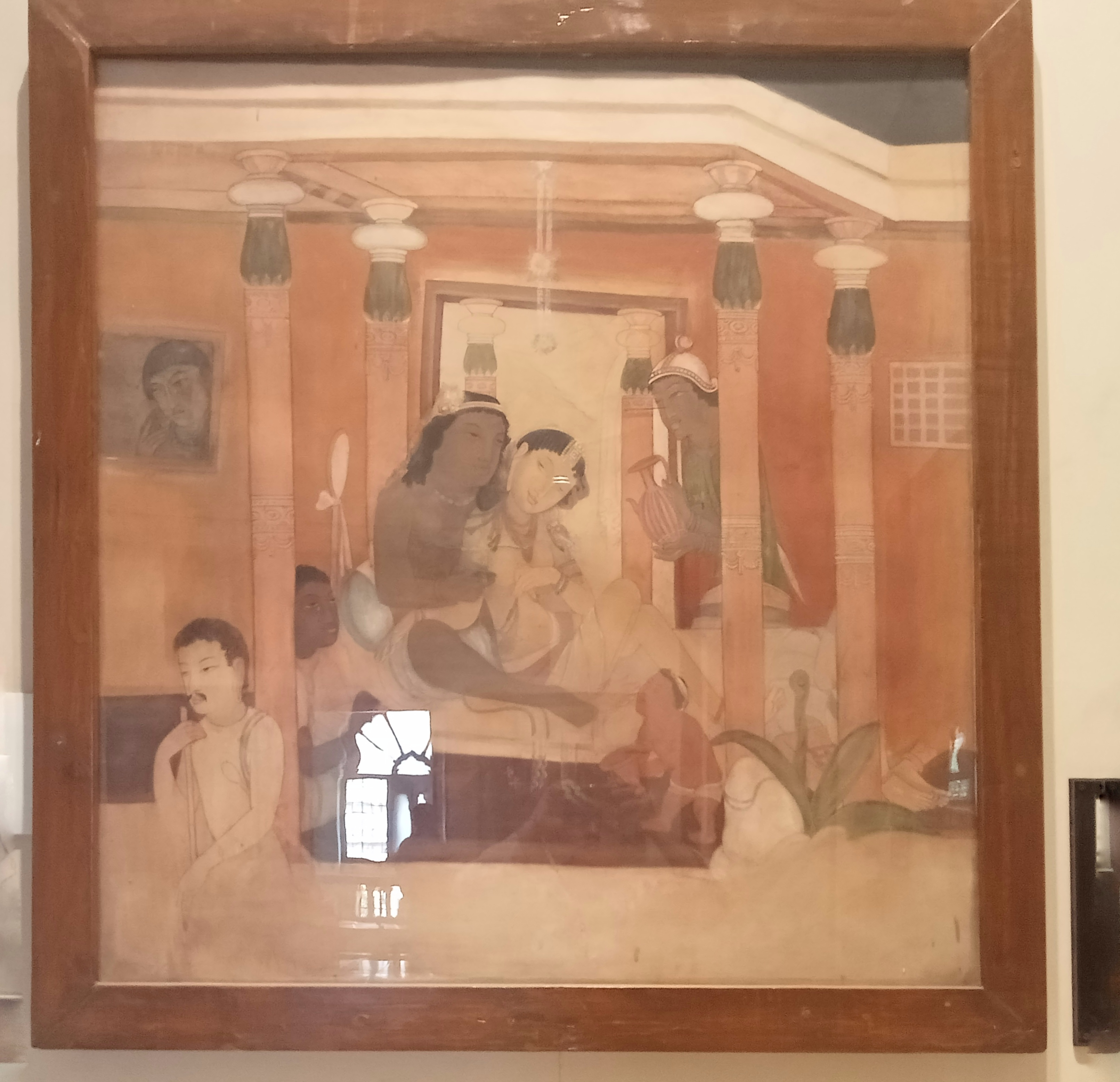
Vessantara Jataka - Ajanta Caves XVII

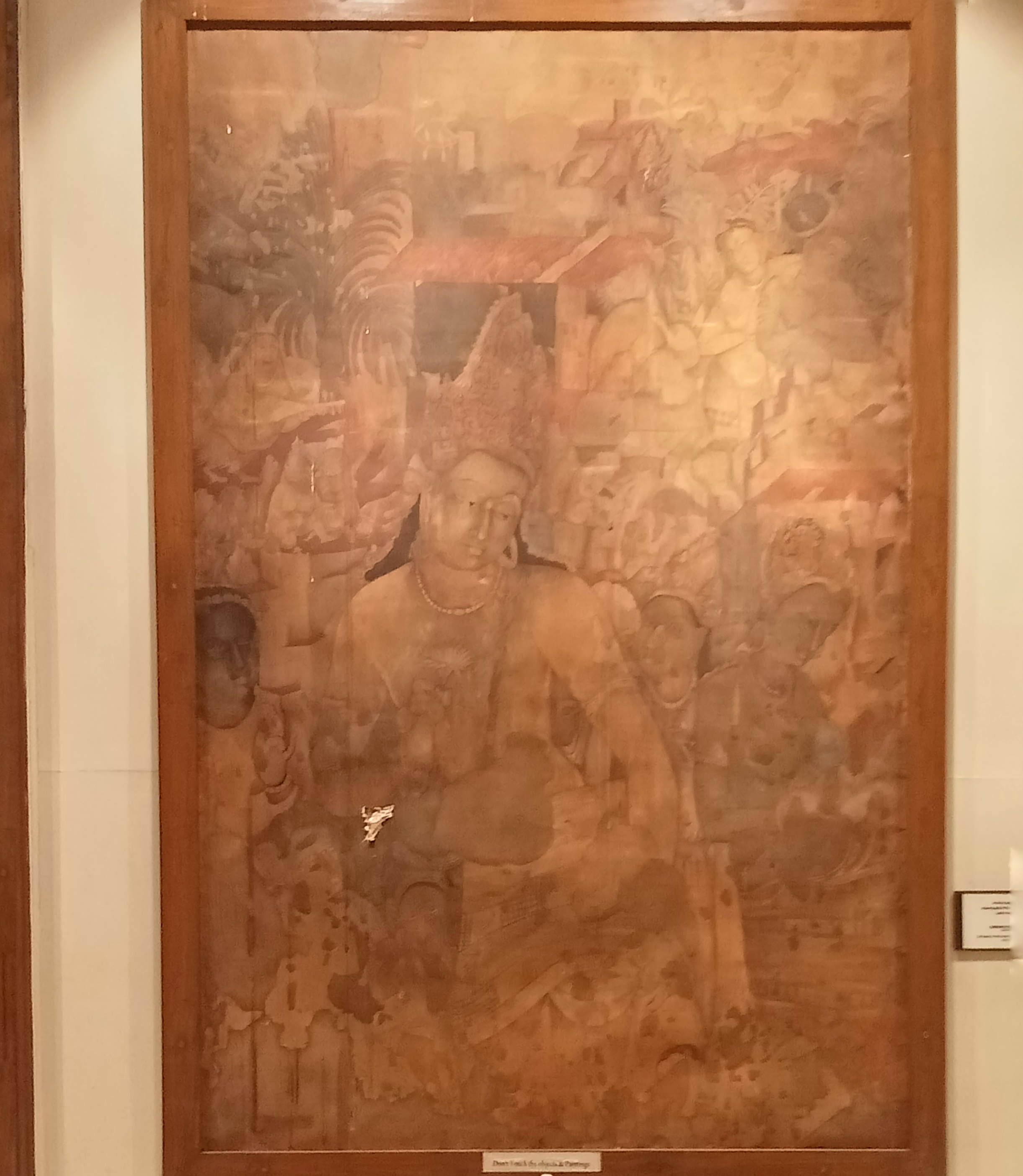
Bodhitsatva Padmapani in Compassionate Mood

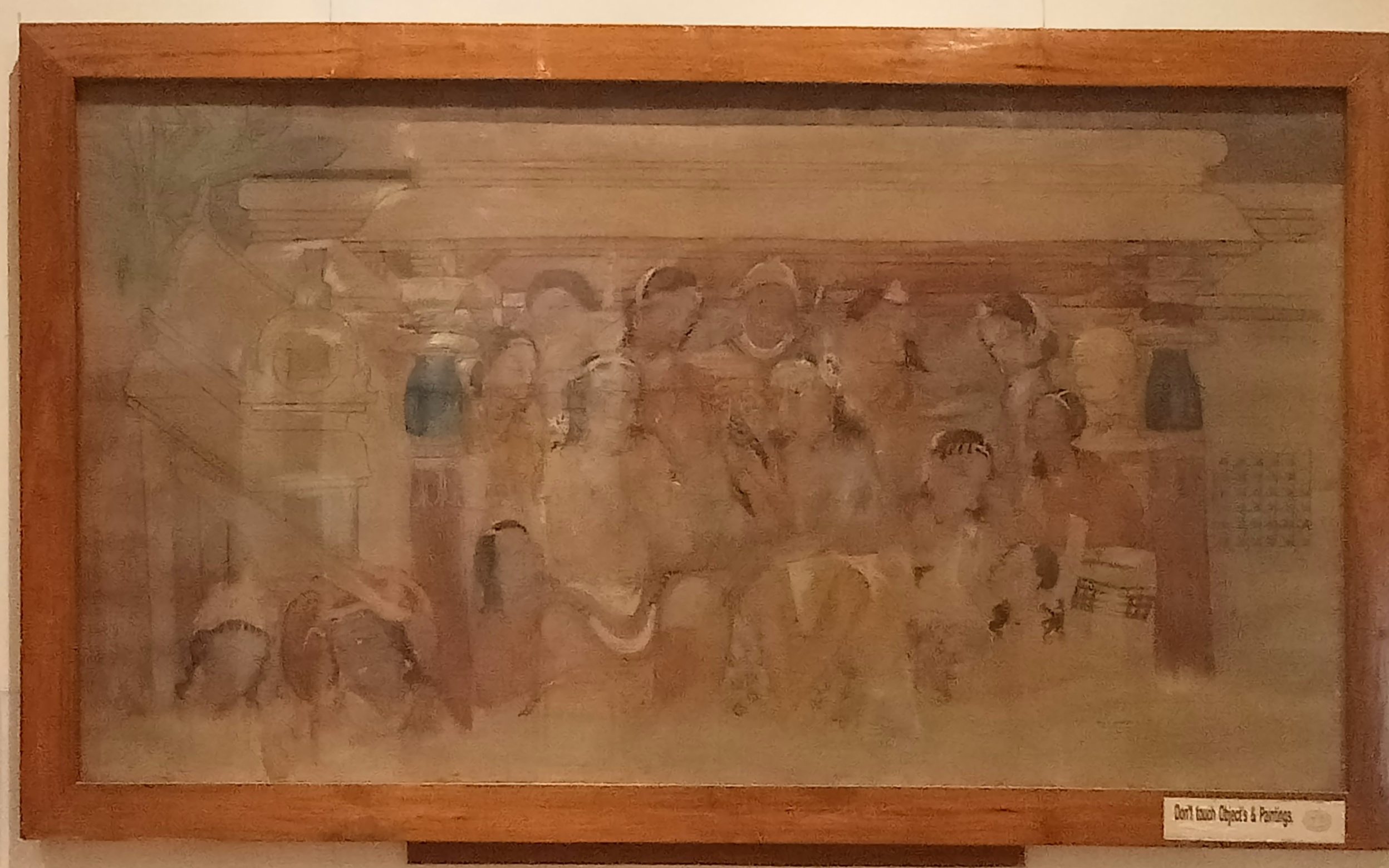
The ogress in disguise enters the King harem Ajanta Caves

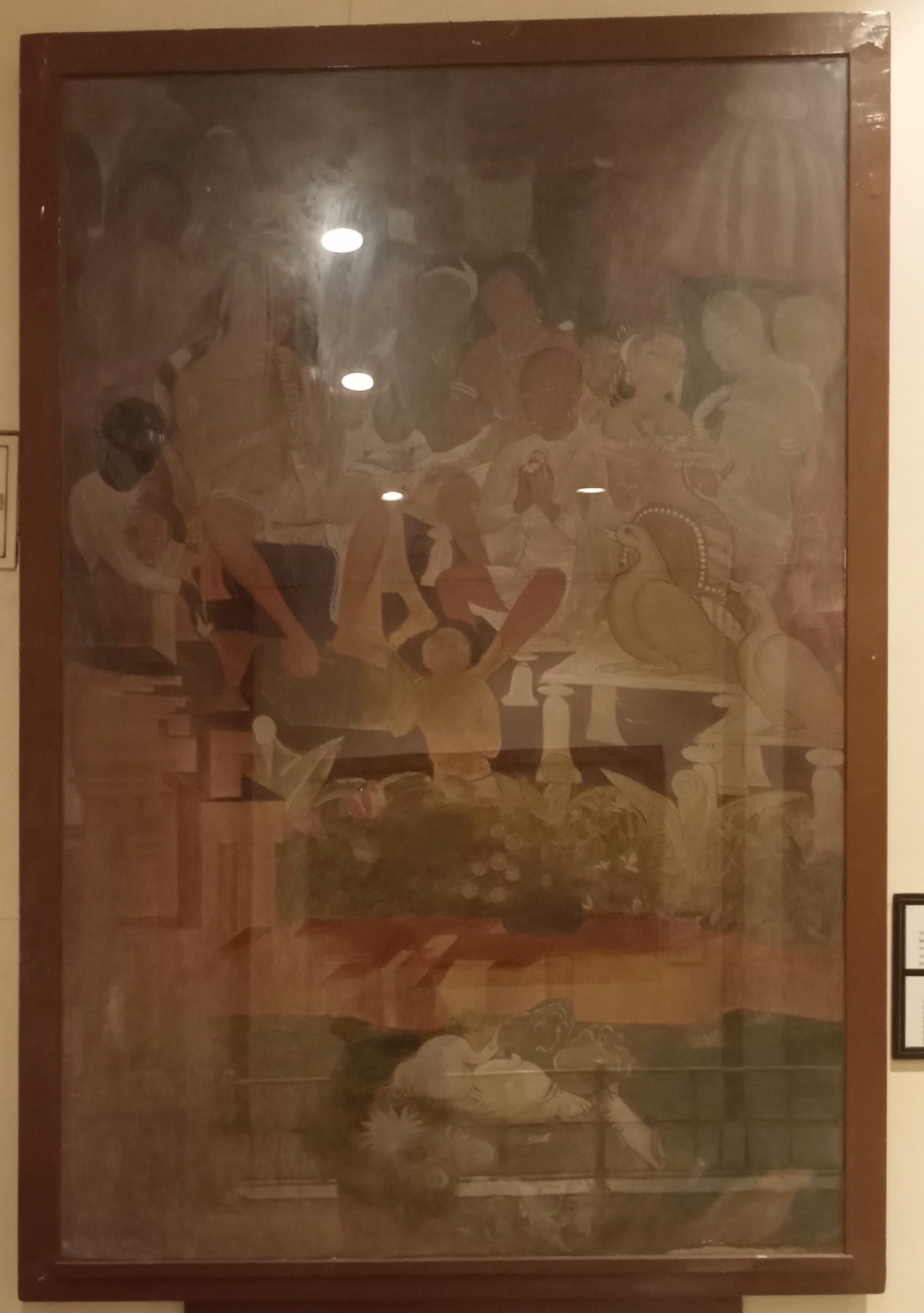
Hamsa Jataka - Cave no, XVII- Ajanta Caves

== Gallery ==
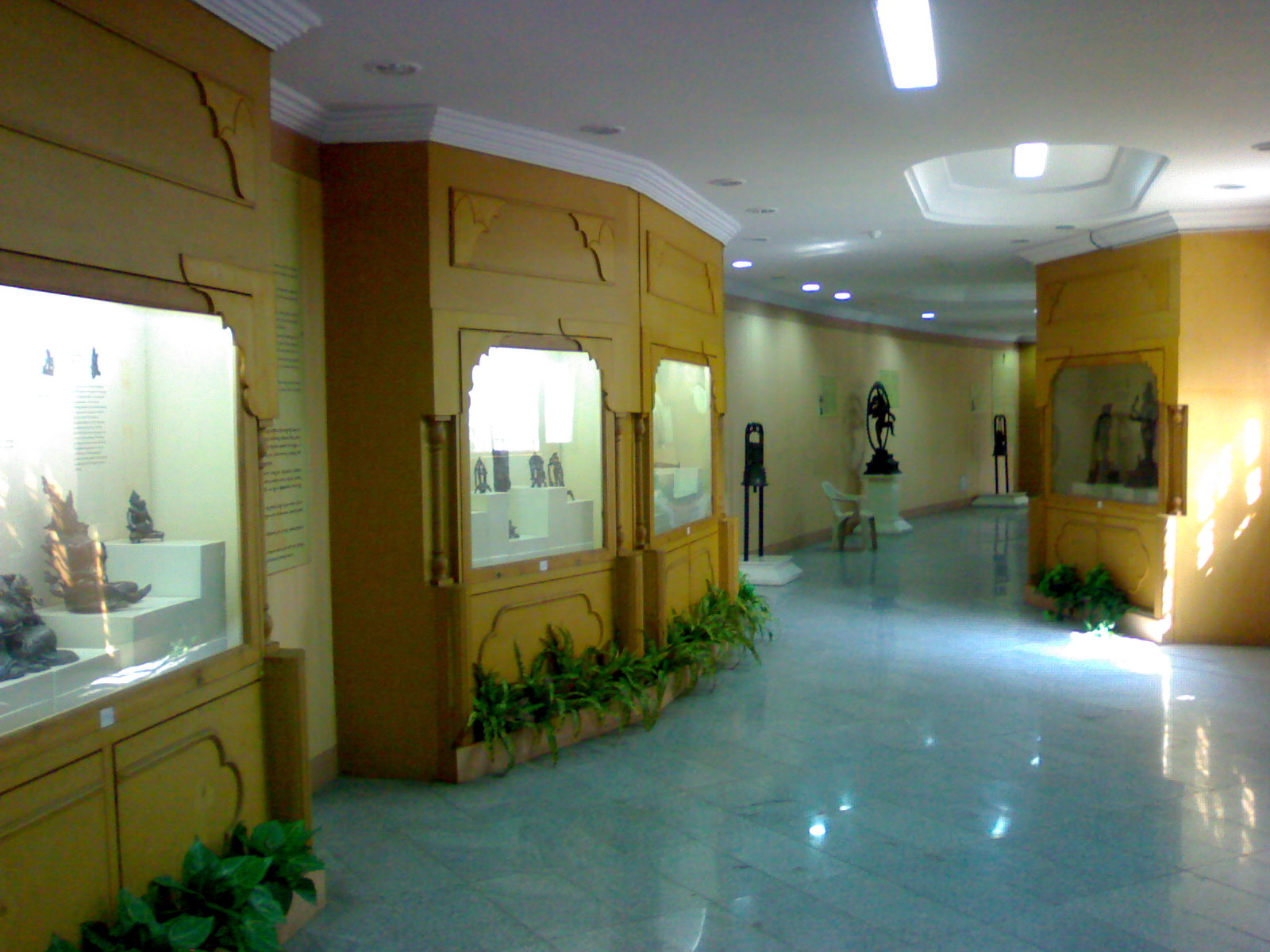
Gallery

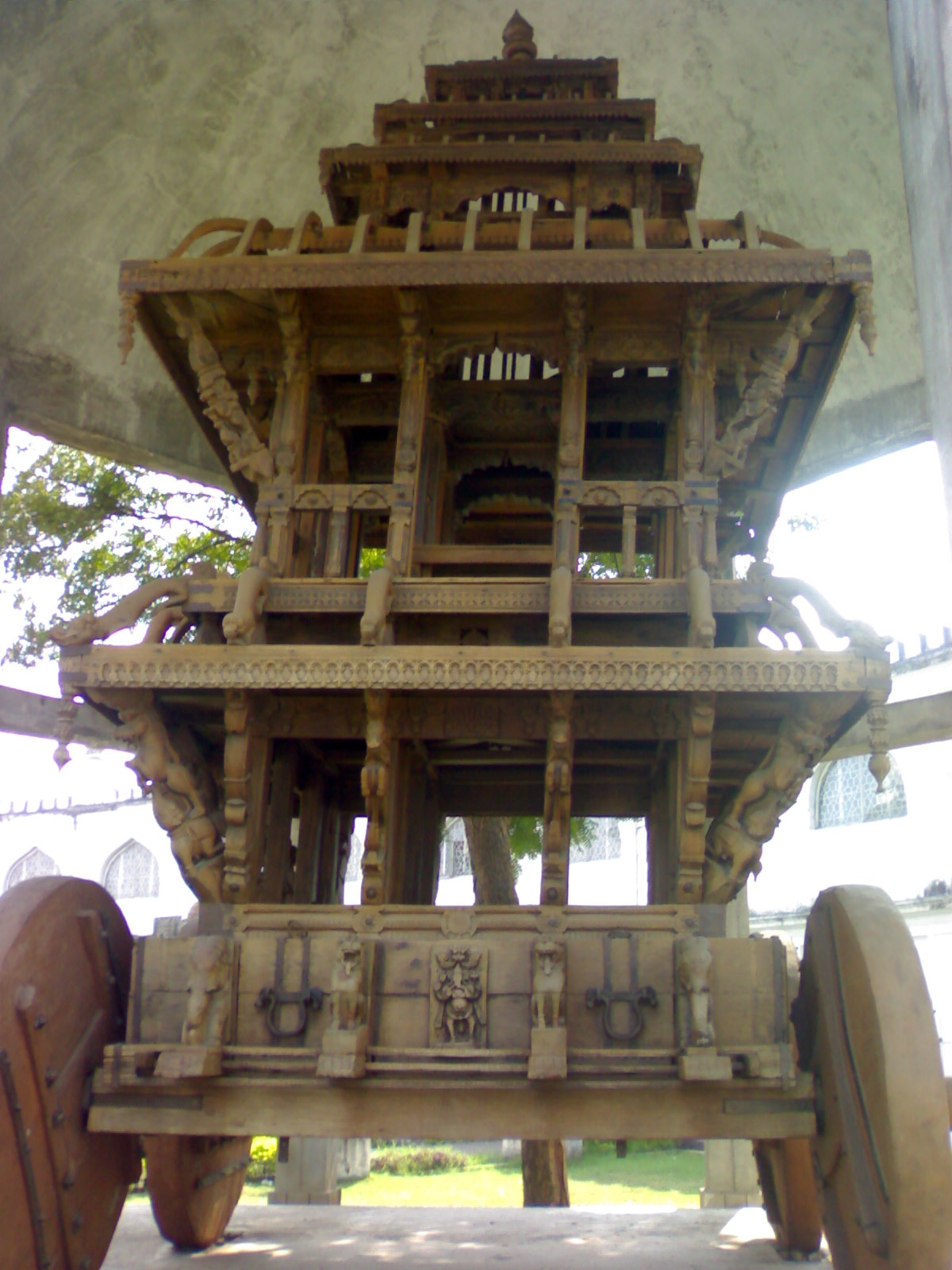
Chariot

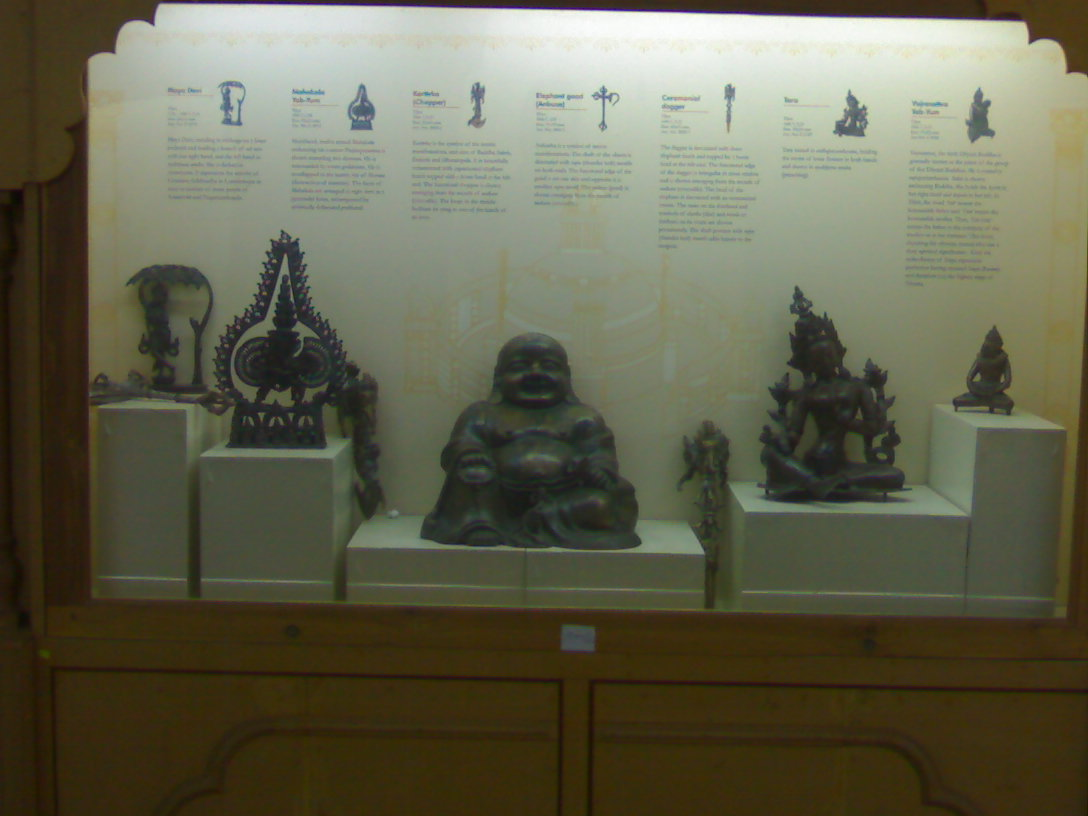
Bronze idols

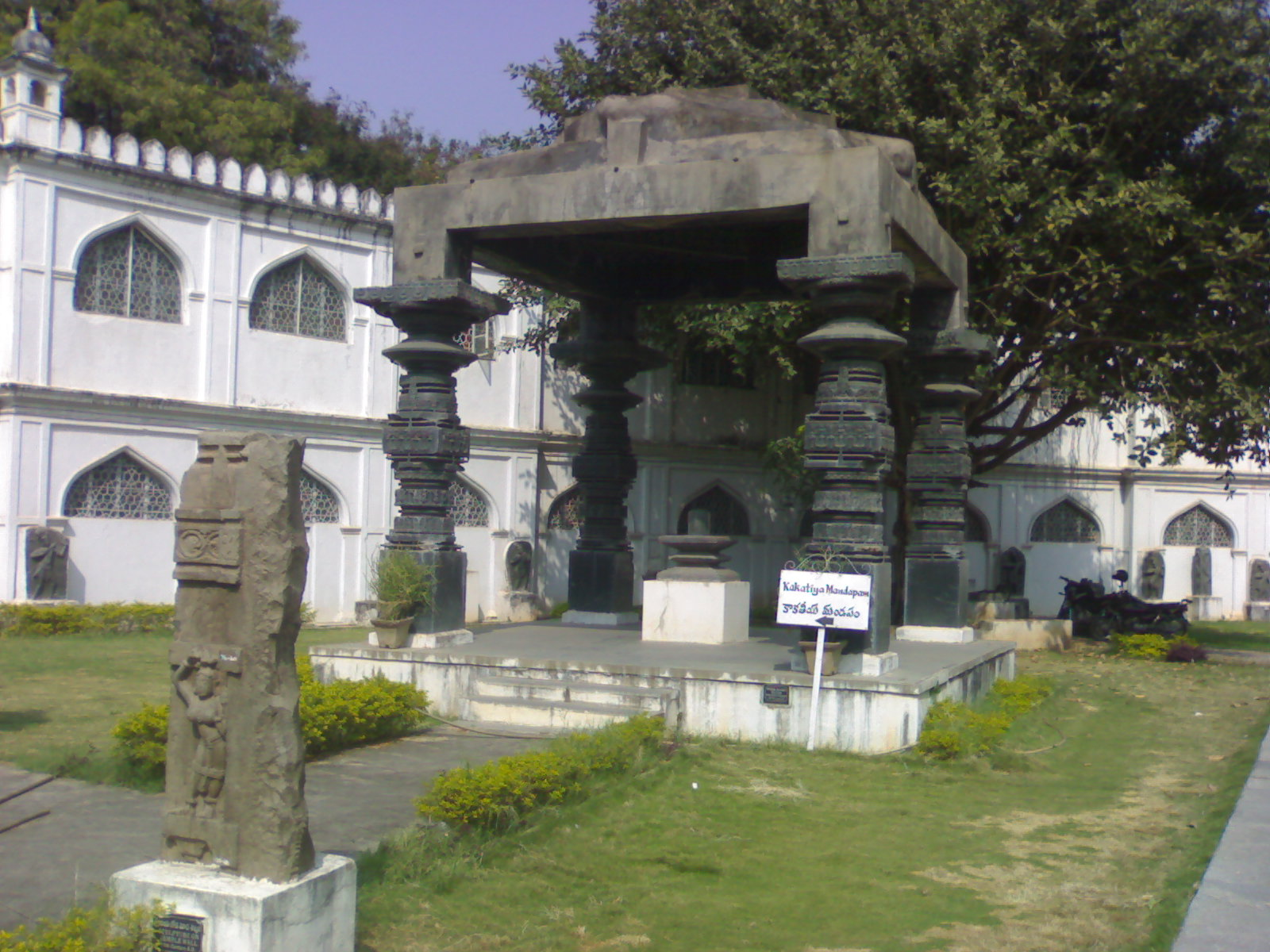
Kakatiya mandapam

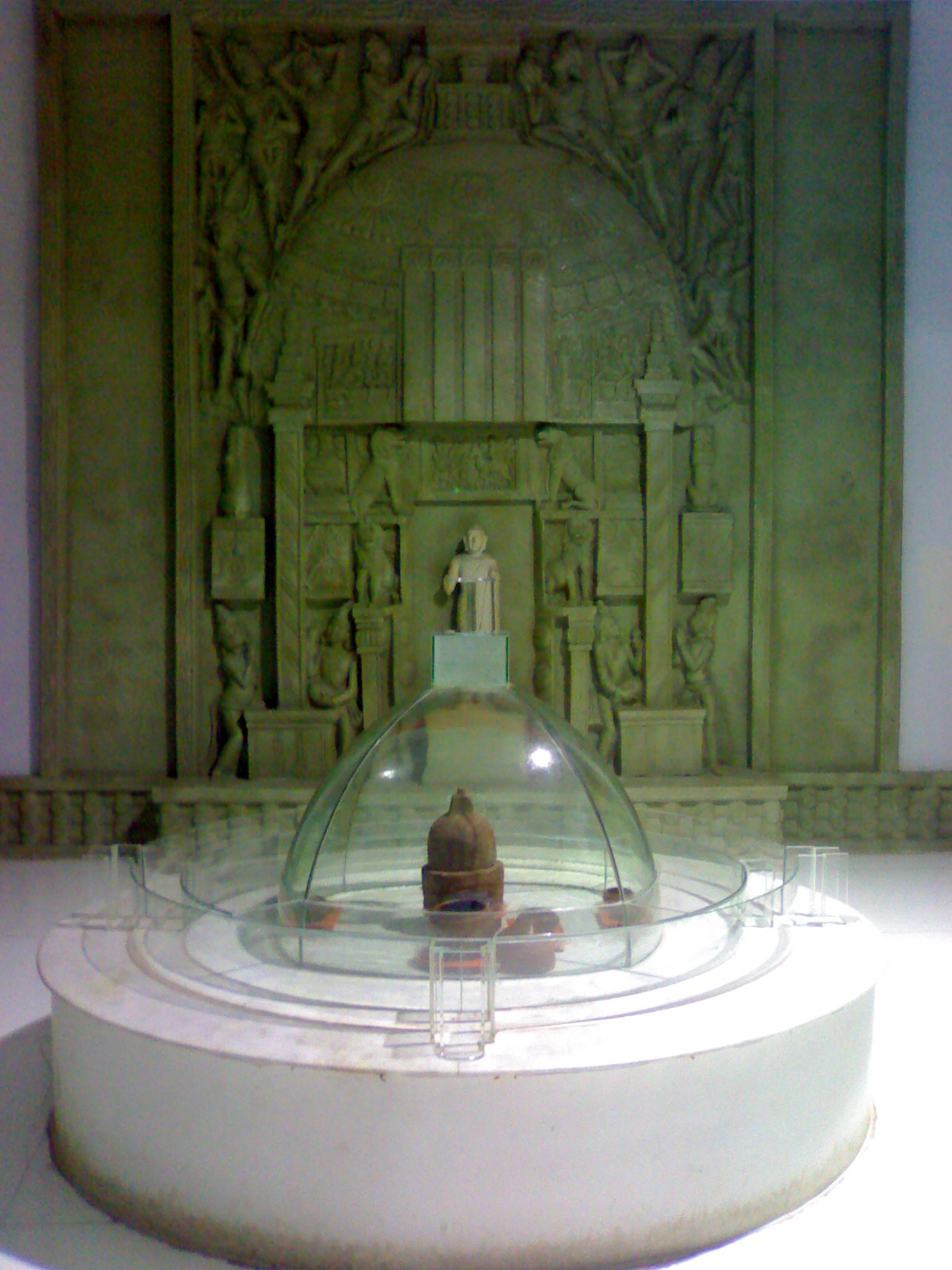
Buddha stupa

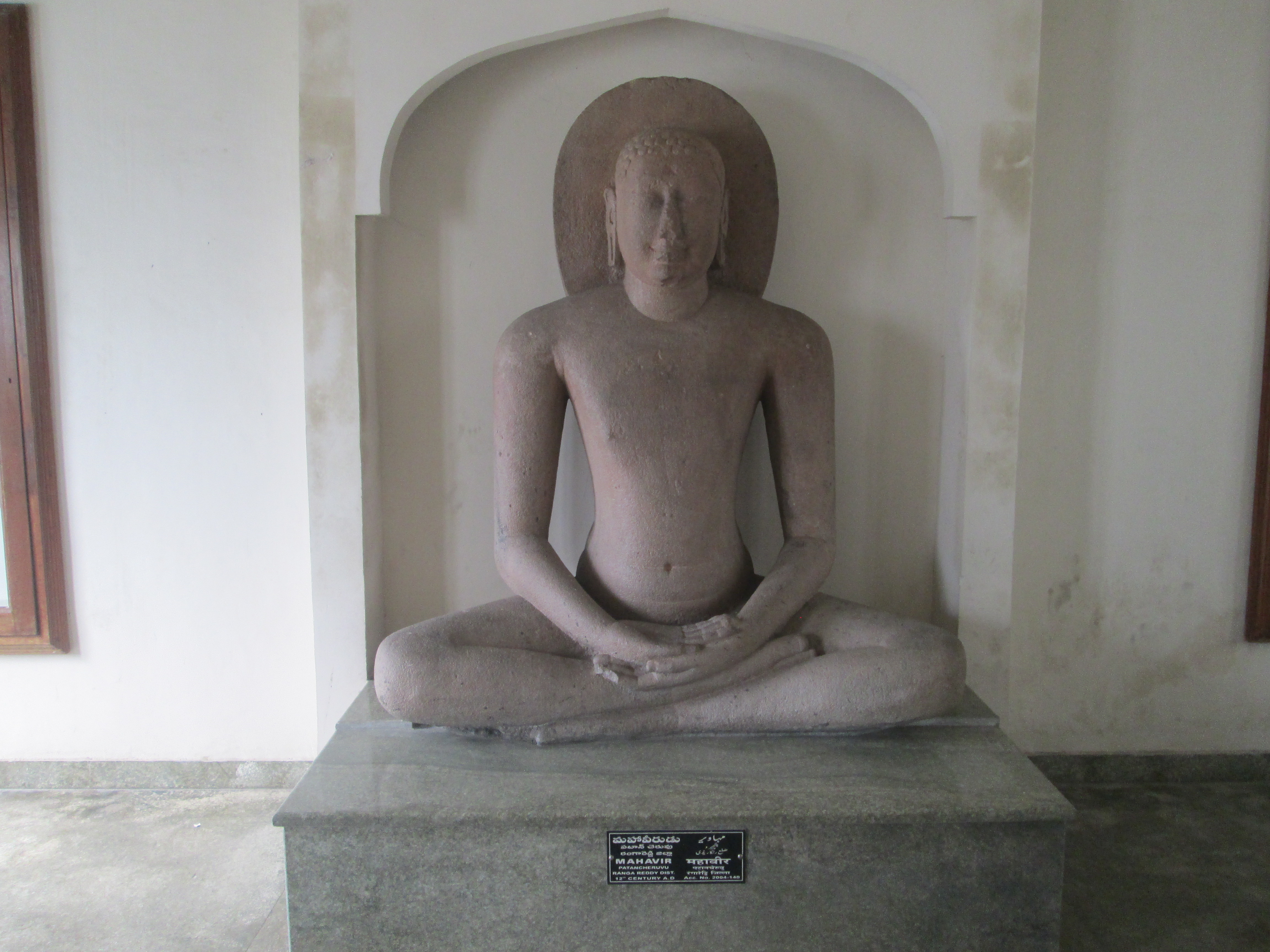
Mahavira Statue, 12th Century

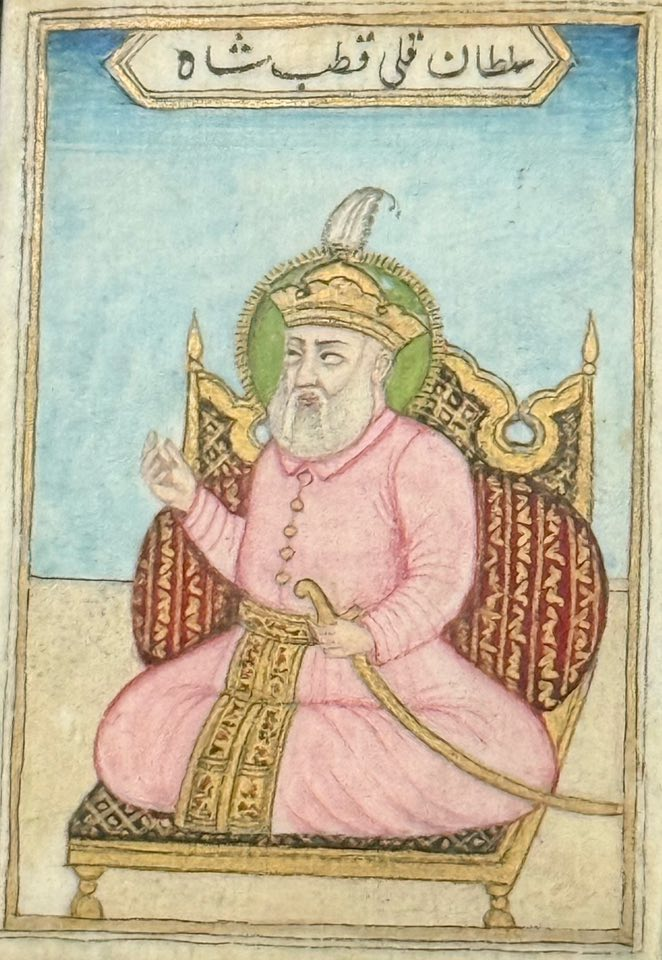
Mughal painting

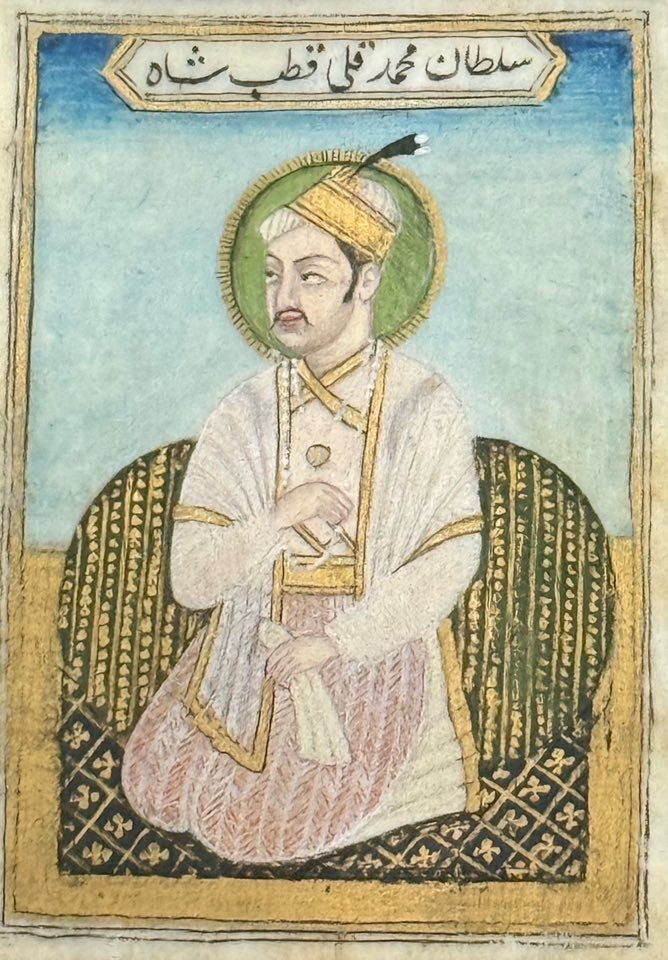
Mughal painting

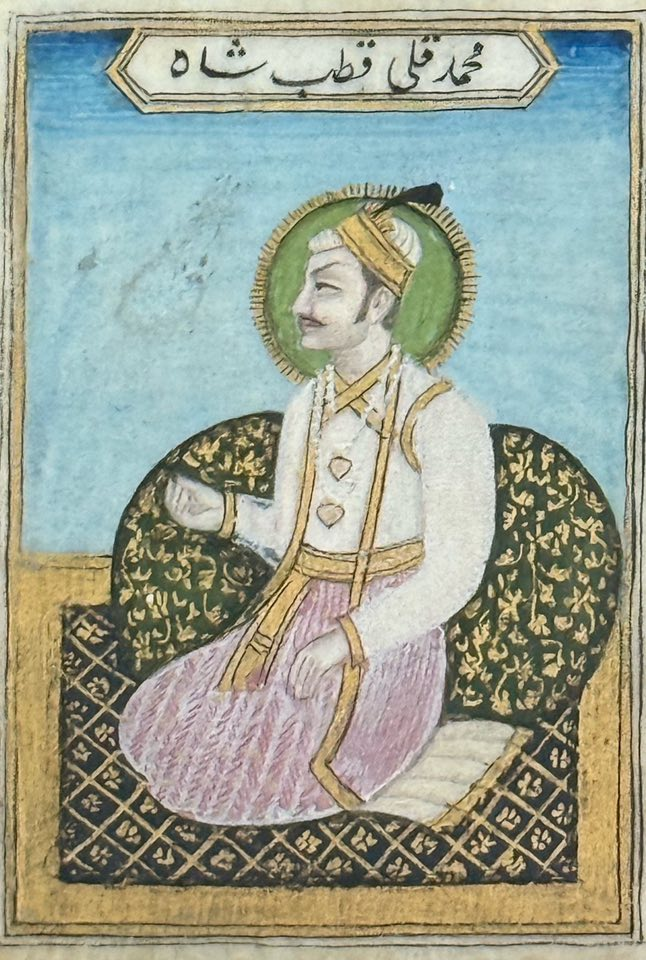
Mughal painting

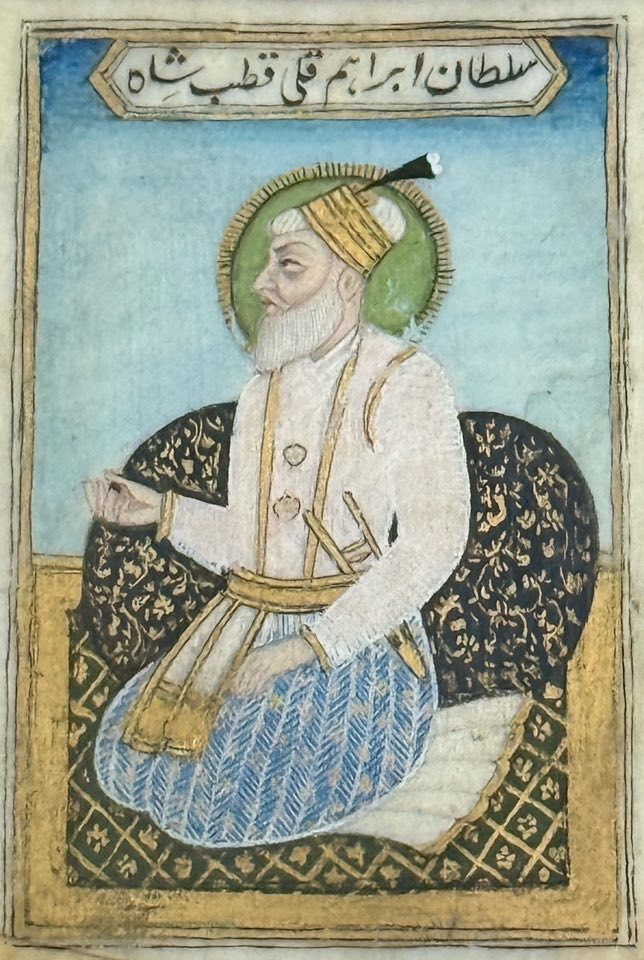
Mughal painting

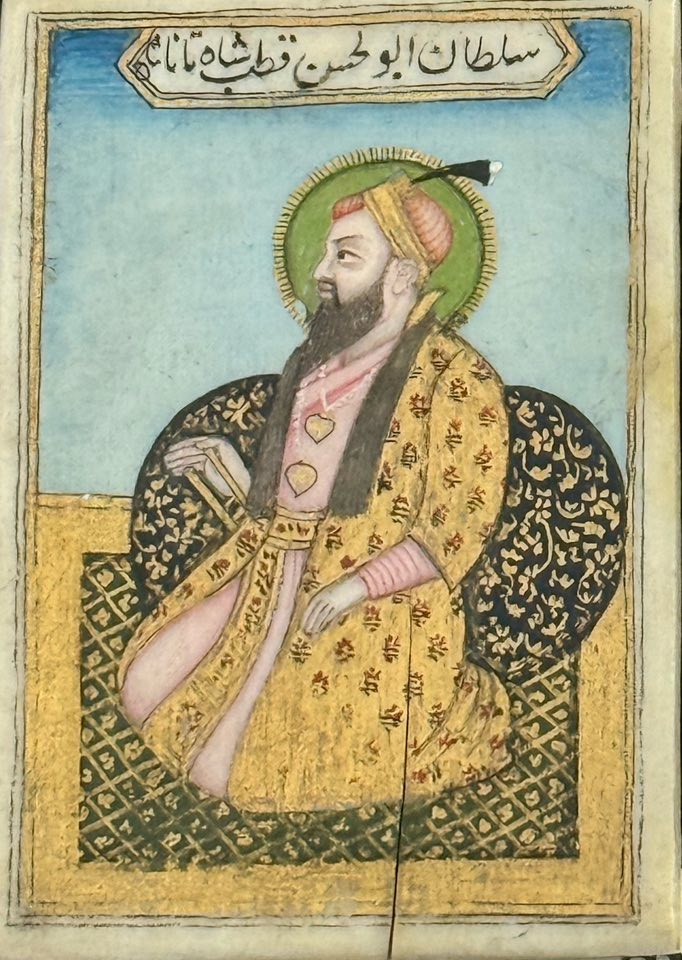
Mughal painting

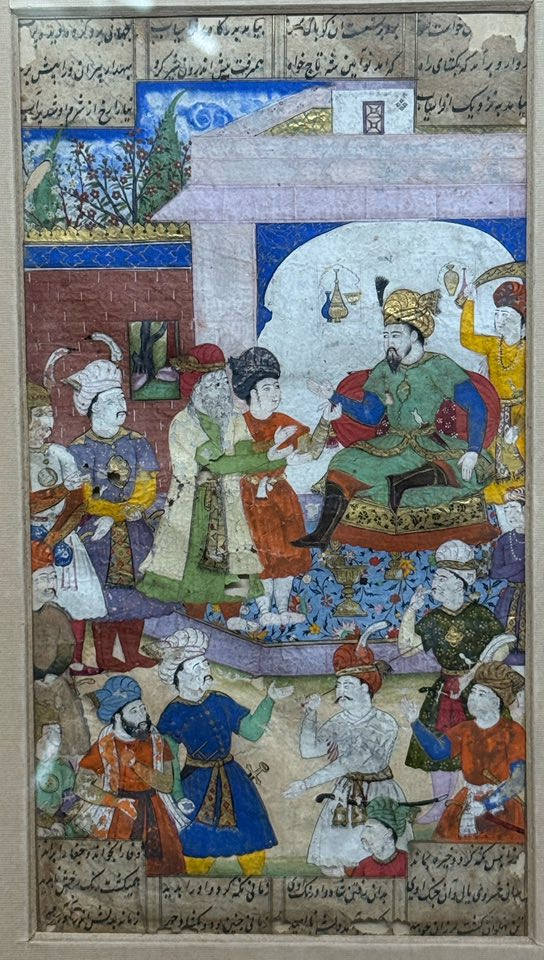
Mughal painting

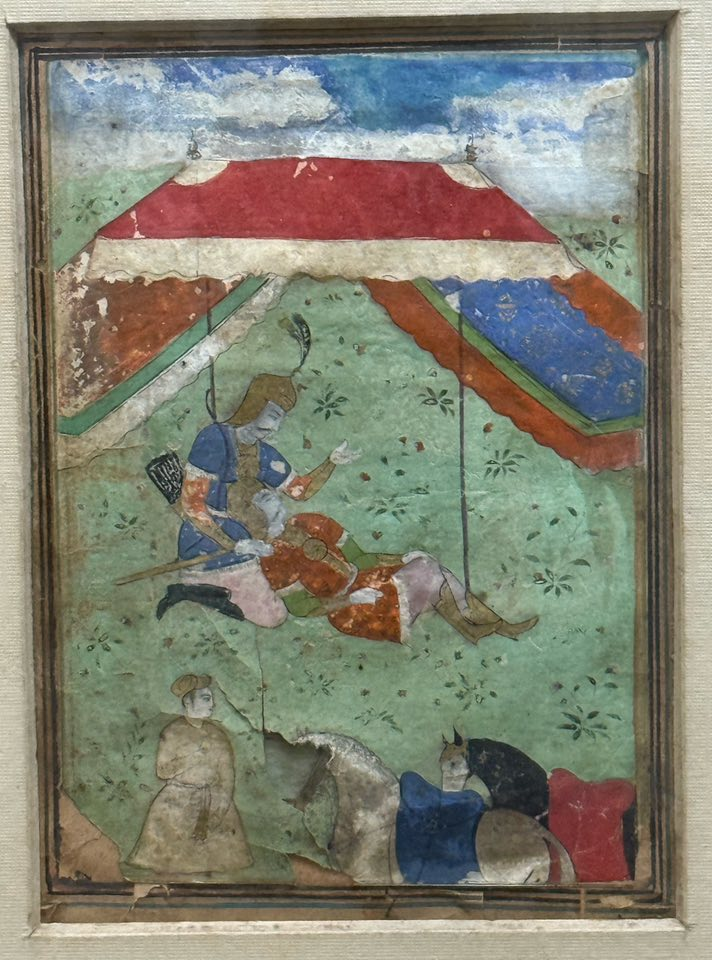
Mughal painting

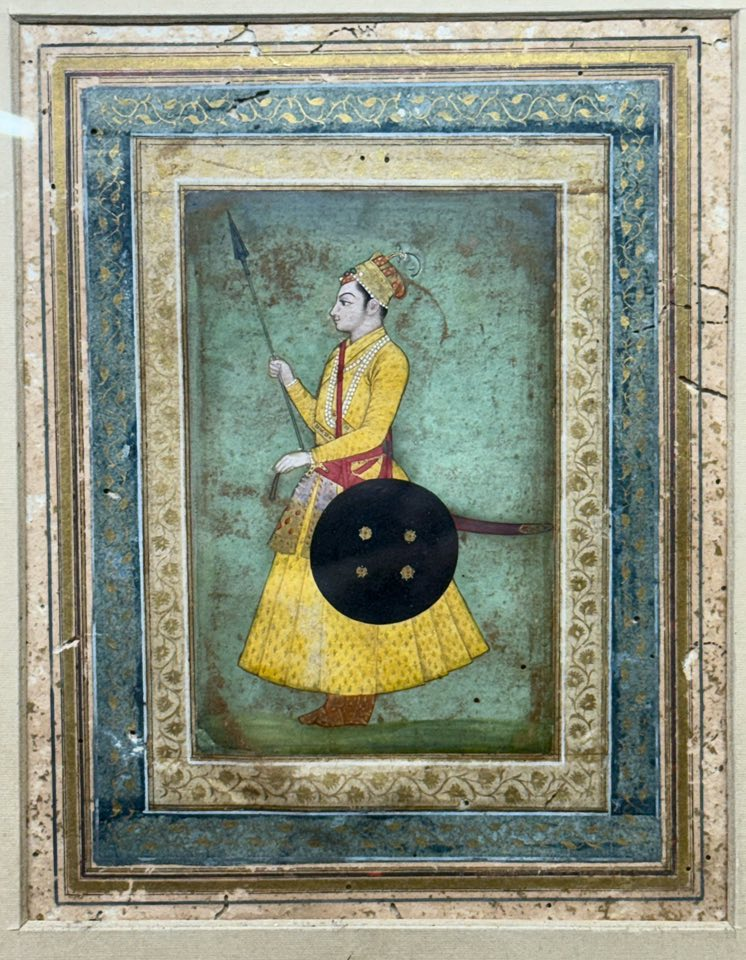
Mughal painting

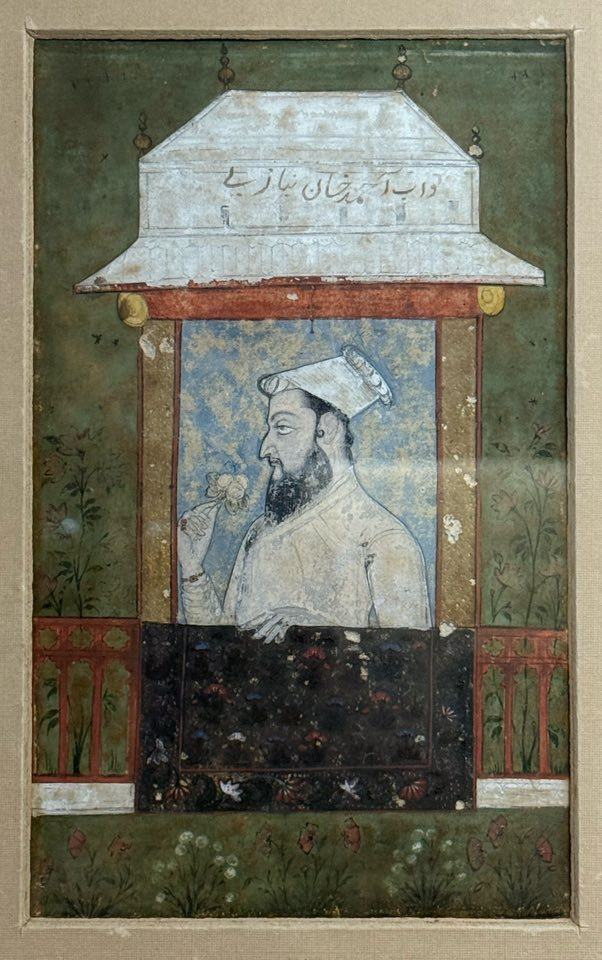
Mughal painting

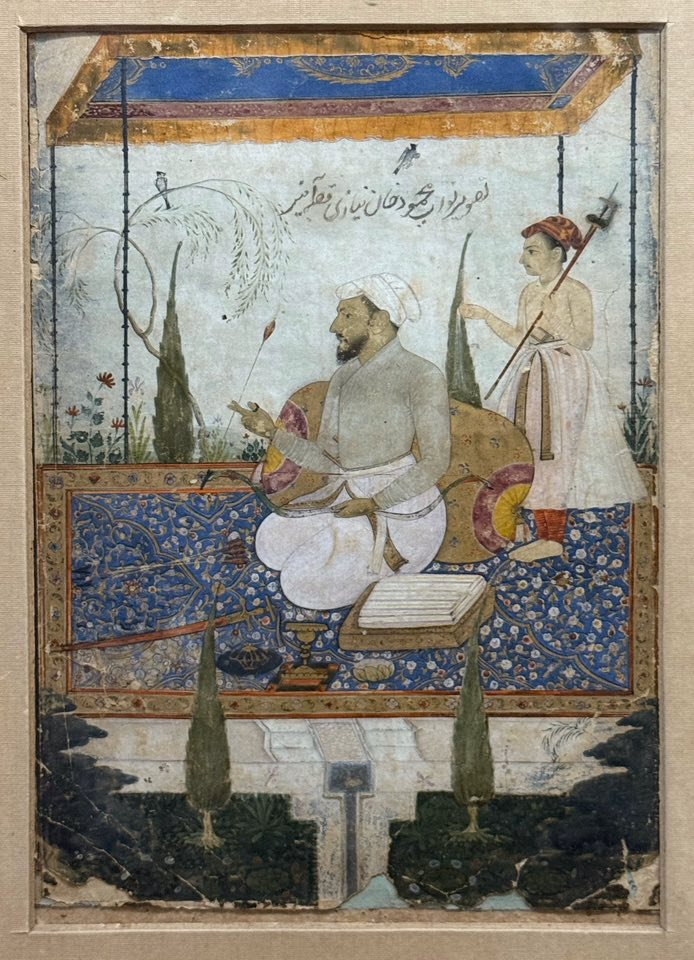
Mughal painting

== See also ==
- The Nizam's Museum
