= Somabara Mandapa (Vishnu Temple) =

Somabara Mandapa(Vishnu Temple)
- Location in Odisha

Religion
- Affiliation: Hinduism
- District: Khurda
- Deity: Vishnu

Location
- Location: Bhubaneswar
- State: Odisha
- Country: India
- Interactive map of Somabara Mandapa(Vishnu Temple)
- Coordinates: 20°15′53″N 85°51′40″E

Architecture
- Type: Kalingan Style (Kalinga Architecture)
- Completed: 15th century AD
- Elevation: 17 m (56 ft)

Vishnu Temple is located within the Kapilesvara Temple precinct Kapilesvara village, Old Town, Bhubaneswar. It was built in the 15th century AD. The temple is facing towards east and the presiding deities of this temple are two Vishnu images, and the image of Jagannatha, Balabhadra, Subhadra and Buddha. The sanctum measures 2.10 square m. The temple is made of laterite stone. It is under the care of the Kapilesvara Temple Trust Board.

== Cultural significance ==
Janmastami, Radhastami, Dola Purnima etc.

== Physical description ==
=== Surrounding ===
The temple is surrounded by Chitresvara temple on its east, Jalesvara temple on its west, compound wall on its southern side and Dakhina Kali temple on its northern side.

=== Architectural features (Plan and Elevation) ===
The temple stands on a high pista measuring 4.05 square m and a height of 1.17 m. On plan, the temple has a vimana and a frontal porch. The vimana is 3.35 square m. On elevation, the pidha temple has bada, gandi and mastaka. Bada is plain and measures 2.30 m, gandi with two tiers 1.50 m, mastaka 1.00 m. From pabhaga to mastaka the total height of the temple is 4.80 m.

=== Decorative features ===
Doorjambs: The doorjambs are plain. On both sides of the doorjambs there are two images of Vayu and Parvati. The image of Vayu on the right side of the doorjamb is seating over a deer in lalitasana. The image is wearing a Padmakundala sacred thread, necklace and crowned by kirita mukuta. Both right and left arms are broken. On the left is a four armed image of Parvati sitting over a lotus pedestal. The lion mount is there in the pedestal.

== State of preservation ==
Good, due to the recent renovation. It was repaired by Odisha State Archaeology under X & XI Finance Commission Award and maintained by Kapilesvara Temple Trust Board.

== See also ==
- List of Hindu temples in India#Orissa
