= Kapilendra Deva =

Gajapati emperor from 1434 to 1466

- Gajapati; Virashri; Rajadhiraja; Brhamarvara; Gaudeshwara; Karnata Kalabargeswara
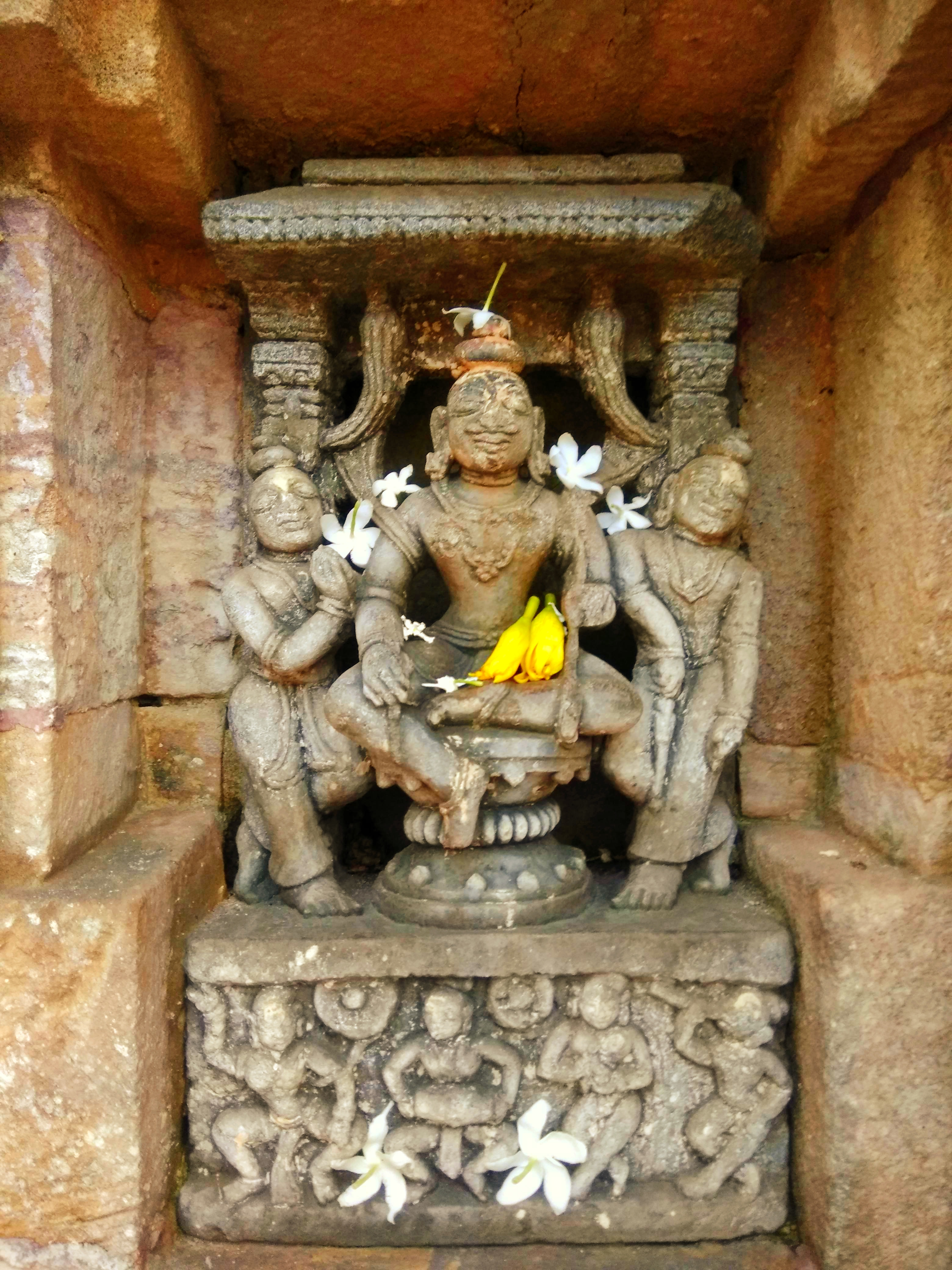
- Gajapati Kapilendra Deva depicted holding a sword and seated in a dominating Lakulisha position at Kapilesvara Siva Temple in Old Bhubaneswar.

1st Gajapati Emperor
- Reign: 1434 – 25 November 1466
- Coronation: 29 June 1435, (Note: Ashadha Krishna Navami tithi, 1492 Vikram Samvat) Bhubaneswar
- Predecessor: Bhanudeva IV (King of Trikalinga)
- Successor: Purushottama Deva

King of Gauda
- Reign: 1450 – 25 November 1466

King of Karnata and Kalabarga
- Reign: 1460 – 25 November 1466
- Died: 25 November 1466; Banks of Krishna River (present-day Andhra Pradesh)
- Spouse: Rupambika; Parvati Devi, etc.
- Issue: Hamvira Deva; Purushottama Deva
Regnal name
- Shri Shri Gajapati Kapilendra Deva
- House: Suryavamsha
- Father: Jageswara
- Mother: Belama
- Religion: Hinduism

Kapilendra Deva (Odia: କପିଳେନ୍ଦ୍ର ଦେବ, romanized: Kåpiḷēndrå Dēbå, died 25 November 1466) was the founder of the Gajapati Empire that ruled parts of eastern and southern India with present-day Odisha as the center of the kingdom. Kapilendra was the most powerful Hindu king of his time, and under him Odisha became an empire stretching from the lower Ganga in the north to the Kaveri in the south. He was known for his aggressive military campaigns, He faced the Jaunpur Sultanate, Bahmani Sultanate and the young Shamsuddin Ahmad Shah of the Bengal Sultanate, who were continuously preparing to invade Odisha and had continuous rivalries with powerful kings such as Deva Raya II of Vijayanagara Empire along with Reddis of Rajamahendravaram.

Kapilendra reduced the taxation and warned the nobles not to oppress the people. He was a devoted worshipper of Jagannath but the Shiva temples did not miss his benefactions. Kapilendra was a patron of arts and letters and the renaissance in Odia literature can be traced from his reign. He imparted fresh vigour and life to a declining kingdom and left it to his son Purushottama, in a prosperous condition. After his death his youngest son Purushottama Deva became the successor by the wish of his father which led to a civil war with his elder brother Hamvira Deva.

== Early life ==
There are multiple popular theories about the origin of Kapilendra Deva's family and his initial life. Records from the Madala Panji of the Jagannath Temple in Puri state that he was known as Kapila Rauta and belonged to the Surya Vamsa line. He used to graze cattle along with a Brahmin named Kasia. Due to a divine symbol of cobra (nāga) seated by his head covering him from the sunlight while he was resting, Kasia predicted that Kapila would become a king one day. Later Kapila went to Puri where he used to beg near the Vimala Temple of the Puri Jagannath temple complex and was later adopted by the last Eastern Ganga dynasty ruler Bhanudeva following a divine dream. He was later appointed in his younger days as a military general of the Ganga forces and was assigned the task to fight the Muslim forces of Bengal. Another version of the Madala Panji maintains the same account with regards to the origin of Kapilendra Deva but changes his name to Kapila Samantara who was at the service of the Ganga king Bhanudeva IV and stayed inside the palace. When the kingdom of Bhanudeva was threatened by an invasion, Kapila Samantara gave a good account of himself as a brave soldier and after the death of Bhanudeva, Kapila became the ruler of Odisha assuming the name Kapilendra Deva.

=== Inscriptions ===
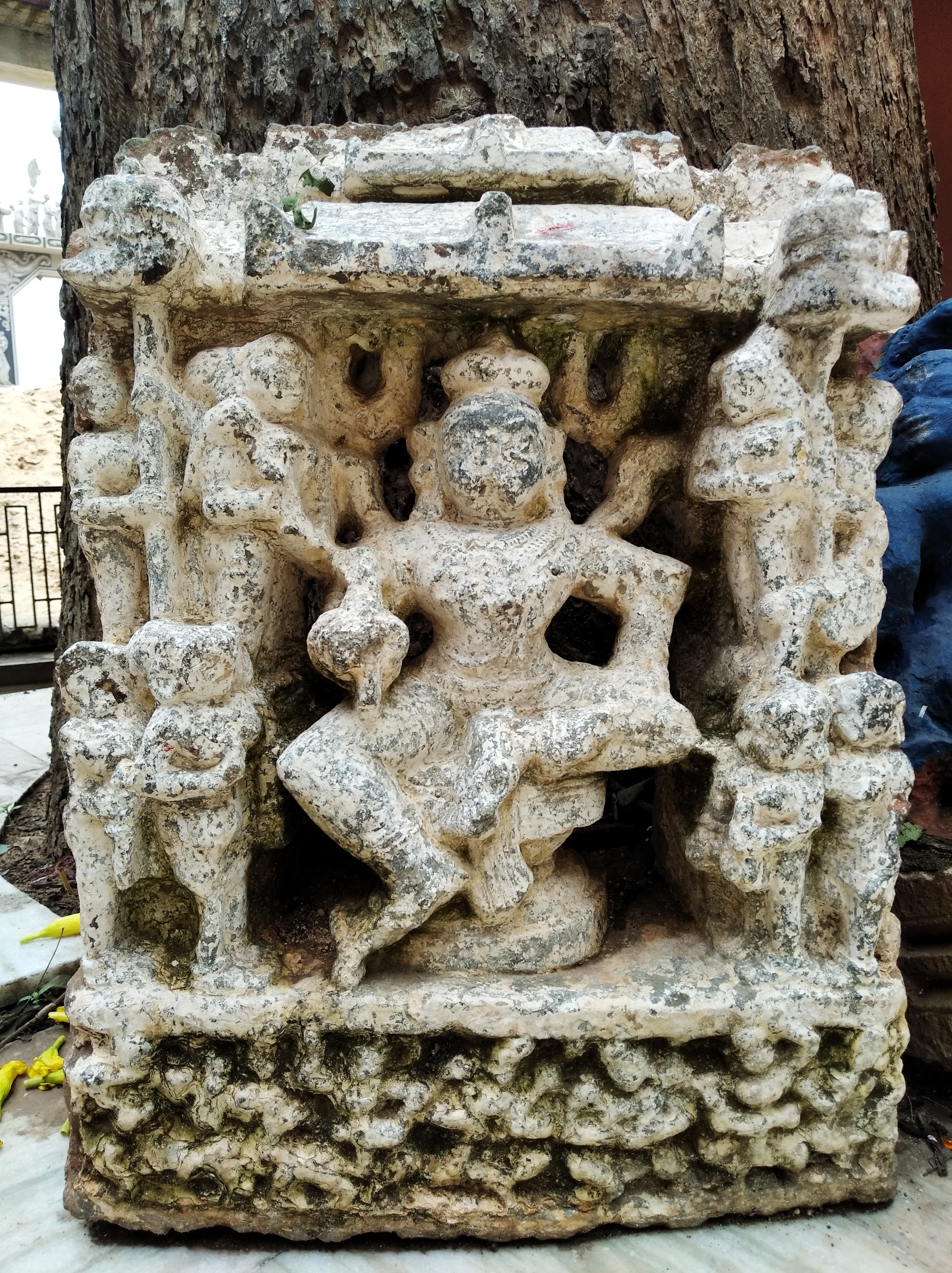
A detached sculpture of Gajapati Kapilndra Deva found at Gadagadeswar Temple, Cuttack, Odisha, India

Raghudevapuram copper plate grant of Raghudeva Narendra who was the governor of Rajamahendravaram Rajya and also a nephew of Kapilendra Deva gives valuable details about the family's history. Their lineage can be traced back to Kapilendra Deva's grandfather Kapileswara who was holding the position of a Nayaka. Kapileswara Nayaka was thus in the military service of the Gangas and occupied the position of a lieutenant in the army. He had a son named Jageswara who was also in the service and possessed a great number of elephants. Jageswara was married to Belama and they had three sons named Balarama, Kapilendra and Parashurama Harichandana. Raghudeva Narendra was the son of Parashurama.

== Suppressing internal rebellions ==
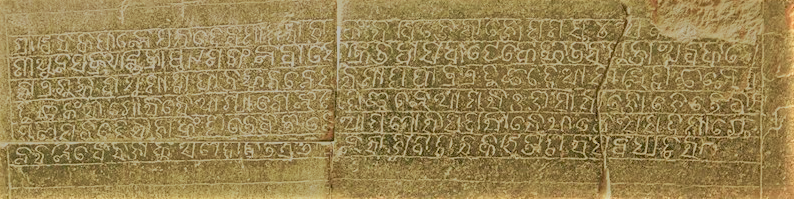
Lingaraja Temple Inscription of Kapilendra Deva issuing warning to the vassal kings for complete loyalty to him or else lose their property and be banished from the kingdom

Due to the weakening administration of the Eastern Ganga dynasty, Kapilendra Deva ascended the throne with internal support while the last ruler of the dynasty, Bhanu Deva IV was on a military expedition in the southern territories. He was declared as the new Monarch with a Rājyābhiṣēka ceremony at Old Bhubaneswar. Since the ascension was through a coup or rebellion, some vassal kings from Odisha such as Matsarvamshi of Oddadi, Shilavamshis of Nandapur, and Vishnukundina of Panchadhara refused to acknowledge his authority and declared themselves independent. Around the same time, the Jaunpur Sultanate also posed an external threat to his realm. He appointed his able minister Gopinath Mahapatra to deal with the Jaunpur threat, which he successfully executed, and Kapilendra Deva himself suppressed the internal rebels with force. The rebels were suppressed by the year 1440 CE. The rebellious troubles that he dealt with by force are proven by his Lingaraja Temple declaration in which he ordered the rebels to accept his rule or be toppled from power.

=== Coronation ===
The chronicle Madala Panji detailed the event of Kapilendra Deva's coronation as Gajapati of the realm succeeding Bhanu Deva IV, the last ruler of the Eastern Gangas. It mentioned that the coronation took place at Old Bhubaneswar on 2 kākara śukḷa 4 aṅka 2. The date with respect to the Odia calendar corresponds to the Gregorian calendar on 29 June 1435. Thus with the coronation of Kapilendra Deva as the Gajapati of the Odradesha realm, he started his era known as Kapilabda and laid the foundation of the Suryavansha dynasty.

=== Kapilendra Deva's Odia military ===
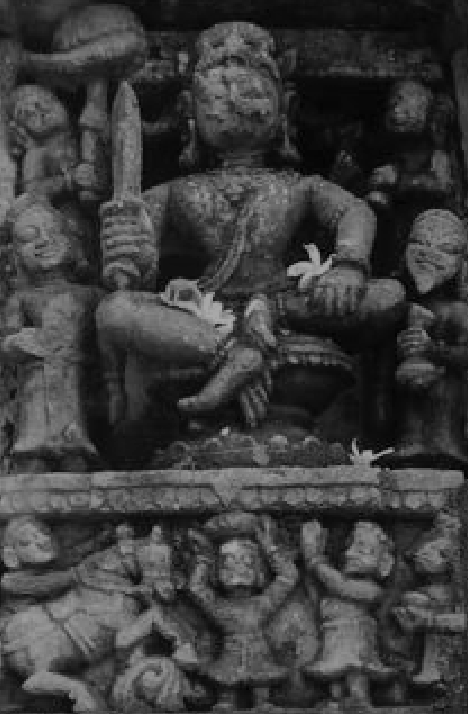
Kapilendra Deva with a sword at Kapilesvara Siva Temple in Old Bhubaneswar

Different historical sources give varied accounts about the Odishan military commanded by the Gajapatis. According to the Muslim Persian text Burhan-i Ma'sir, Kapilendra had an elephant force numbering two hundred thousand (or two lakhs; 2,00,000). This number of war elephants is usually a very huge number compared even to any military of the existing kingdoms during the times of Kapilendra Deva himself in India. Nizzamuddin writes that the Gajapati encamped on the Godavari river banks with an infantry of seven hundred thousand (or seven lakhs; 7,00,000). Another Muslim source documents that Kapilendra Deva raided Bidar with only 10,000 foot soldiers while being assisted by the Vellamati chiefs of Telangana.

== Reign ==
The military hegemony of Odisha had declined during the last line of Eastern Ganga dynasty rulers which provided enough opportunity for the rising powers in its neighborhood. When Kapilendra Deva took over the throne, hostile Muslim powers like the Sultan of Jaunpur (Mahmud Shah), Bahmani Sultanate and the young ruler of Bengal Samsuddin Ahmad Shah were continuously preparing to invade Odisha. Rival Hindu powers such as Deva Raya II of Vijayanagara along with Reddys of Rajmahendri had conquered advancing as far as the Simhanchalam territory in the south. Along with suppressing internal rebellions, Kapilendra Deva first defeated the Jaunpur forces and then contained the Bengal forces with the help of his minister Gopinath Mahapatra after which only he initiated his aggressive military campaigns of the Southern and Deccan parts of India. During his reign, Jaunpur Sultanate twice invaded Odisha. Once by Mahmud Shah in 1444 and another in 1458 by Husain Shah. Kapilendra shifted the attacks paying tribute to the Sharqi monarchs.

=== Conquest of Gauda region in Bengal ===
The Gopinathpur inscription of 1447 CE describes his campaign against the Sultan of Bengal who tried to raid Odisha but was beaten back by the Gajapati army led by Gopinath Mahapatra, the minister of Kapilendra Deva. The Gajapati army conquered territories of Bengal to the west of Ganga river including the fort of Gar Mandaran. Historian R. Subramaniam describes that the title 'Brhamarbara' retained by Kapilendra Deva from the days of his service at the Ganga king's court clearly signifies his control over Brhamarkuta region of Bengal. An inscription in the Jagannath temple of Puri that is dated to the year 1450 CE narrates the conquest of Gauda by Kapilendra Deva after defeating Malika Parisa (Malik Padishah) which in short refers to the contemporary Persianate Sultan of Bengal by the name Nasiruddin Mahmud Shah. The region east of the river Ganga and until modern Burdhawan district was known as the Jaleswar division which was handed over to the later ruler of Bengal Ali Vardi Khan by the Marathas during their time. Kapilendra Deva's aide Jalesara Narendra Mahapatra was appointed as the governor of this region. After this victory, Kapilendra Deva accepts the title epithet of Gaudeshwara meaning the Lord of the Gauda kingdom. Katakarajavanshavalli records state about the holy dip of the Gajapati himself in the river Gaṅgā and the Dāna of Tulasipur shasan villages to the Brahmins there. This clearly indicates that Kapilendra Deva was in control of regions beyond the river Ganga to its East.

=== The conquest of Rajamahendri ===
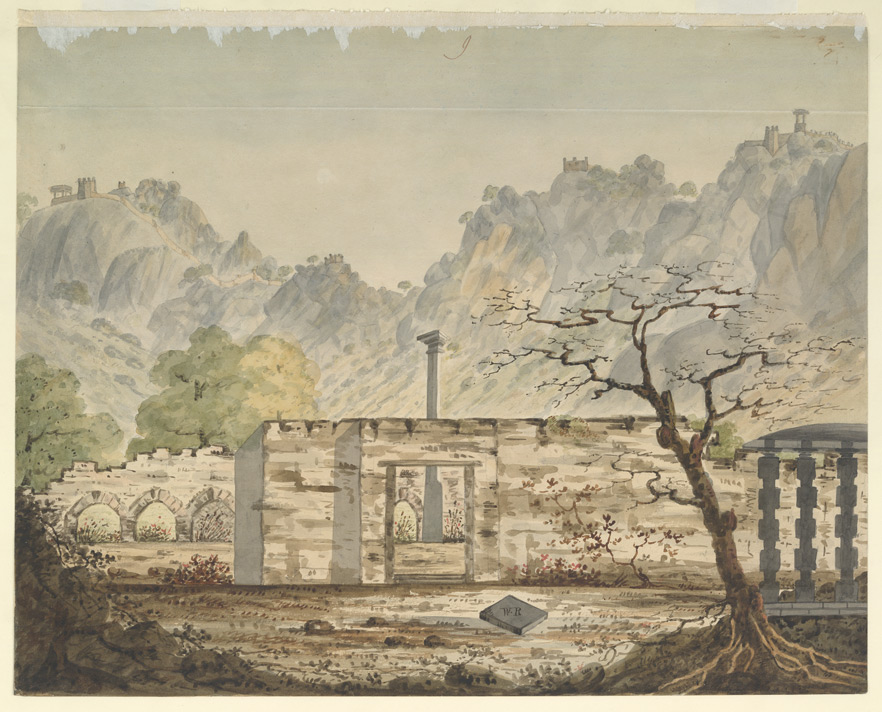
1804 picture of Kondaveedu Fort near Guntur, Andhra Pradesh, India

- First Campaign in 1444 CE - The first campaign against the alliance of Vijayanagara Empire and Rajamahendri Reddys was unsuccessful as Odia forces had to face a two front war with both the Jaunpur Muslim forces in the north and the rival Vijayanagara Hindu forces under the able leadership of the Deva Raya II's able general Mallapa. Kapilendra Deva first diverted his attention in dealing with the invasion in the northern frontiers and hence the campaign in the south was abandoned.
- Second Campaign in 1446 CE and Capture of Kondaveedu by Hamvira Deva - The Odia forces returned in the year 1446 CE led by the Prince Hamvira Deva or Hamvira Kumara Mahapatra, the eldest son of Kapilendra Deva. The political alliance between the Vijayanagara Empire and the Reddi Kingdom had ceased to exist as Deva Raya II had died and the power passed on to a weaker successor in Mallikarjuna Raya. Kapilendra took advantage of this position in the kingdom of Rajahmundry and sent his son Hamvira with a large army and succeeded in defeating the Reddis very easily. The kingdom of Rajahmundry was thus brought under the sway of Kapilendra before A. D. 1448.

=== Conquest of Kondaveedu ===
The territory to the south of the Krishna was under the political sway of the Vijayanagar kings till 1453. This fact is borne out by an inscription of Mallikarjuna dated 1453, at Matamuru in the Guntur district. After August 1453, Kapilendra's army crossed the Krishna and occupied Kondavidu. Ganadeva Rautraya a relation of Kapilendra, was appointed as the governor of Kondaveedu, Addanki and Vinukonda. Therefore, almost the whole of the Guntur district passed into the hands of the Gajapati Kingdom between 1453 and 1454. The epigraph records conclusively proves that by A.D. 1454 Kapilendra had become the master of the former Reddi kingdoms of Rajamahendravaram and Kondaveedu.

Dr. Venkataramanaya, points out that some of the Telugu chiefs transferred their allegiance to Kapilendra. when the power of the Raya of Vijayanagara declined on the banks of the Krishna. We learn from chatu verse that Pushapati Tammaraju occupied many forts including Bellamkonda, Vadapalle, Ramgarajukonda as an overlord Kapilendra.

=== Malwa expeditions ===
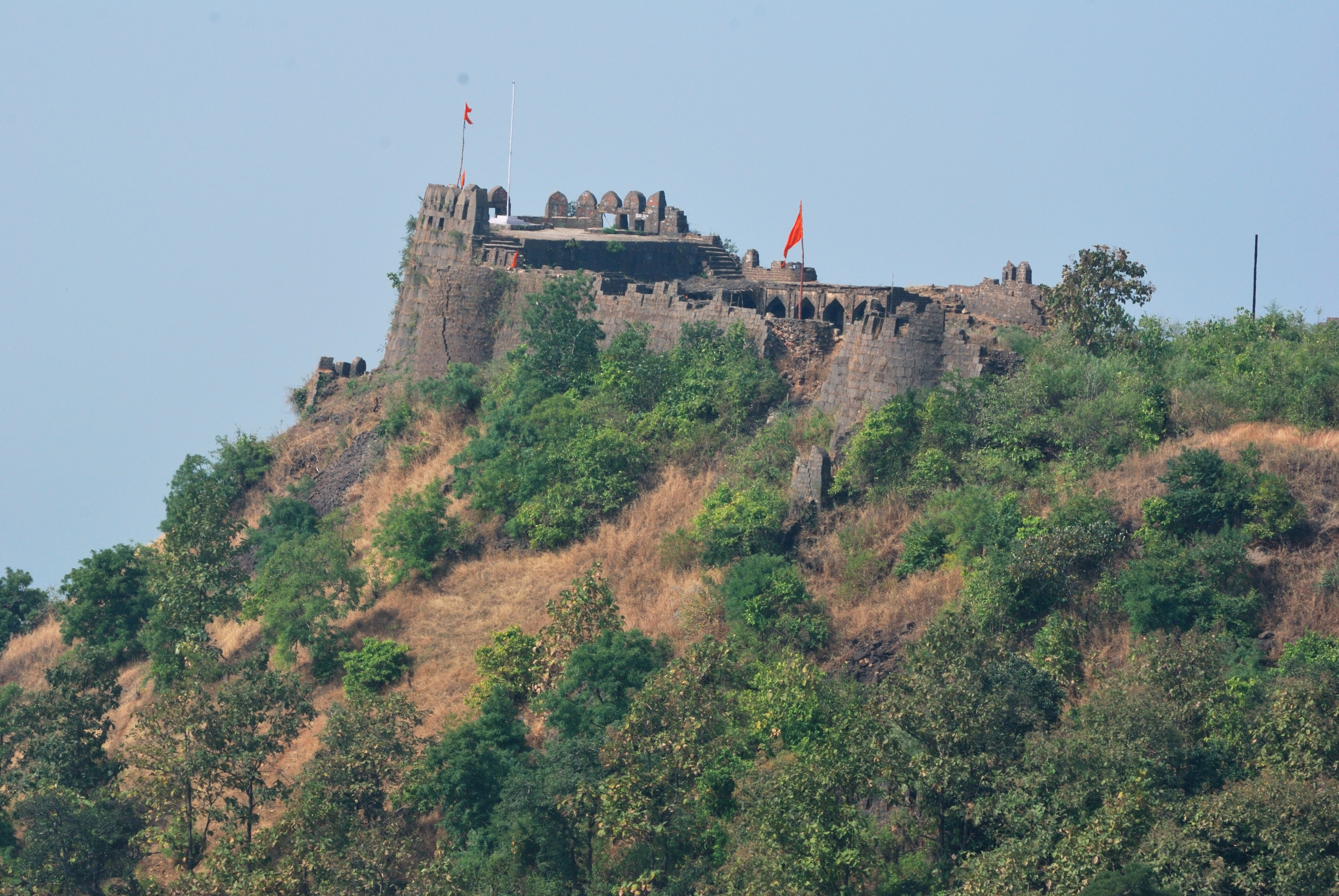
Mahur Fort captured by Gajapati Kapilendra Deva

- Conquest of Mahur - The Veligalani plates and Chiruvrolu inscriptions records the prowess of the Gajapati during the Malwa expeditions. Although there is not much mention of a war, but it does show geopolitical scenario in the region during the march of Gajapati Kapilendra Deva's forces as is described by the fear of the Gajapati army among the rulers of Vijayanagara, Gulbarga and Malwa. The text Gaṅgādāsapratāpavilāsam and the cāṭu verses mentions the conquest of the Mahur Fort in 1457 CE during the Malwa expeditions. It describes the campaign where Kapilendra Deva's forces marched against the dominions of the Turko-Persian Malwa and Bahmani Sultanates and wrested control of the forts of Mahur and Buradakota (Bidar).

=== Conquest of Telangana ===
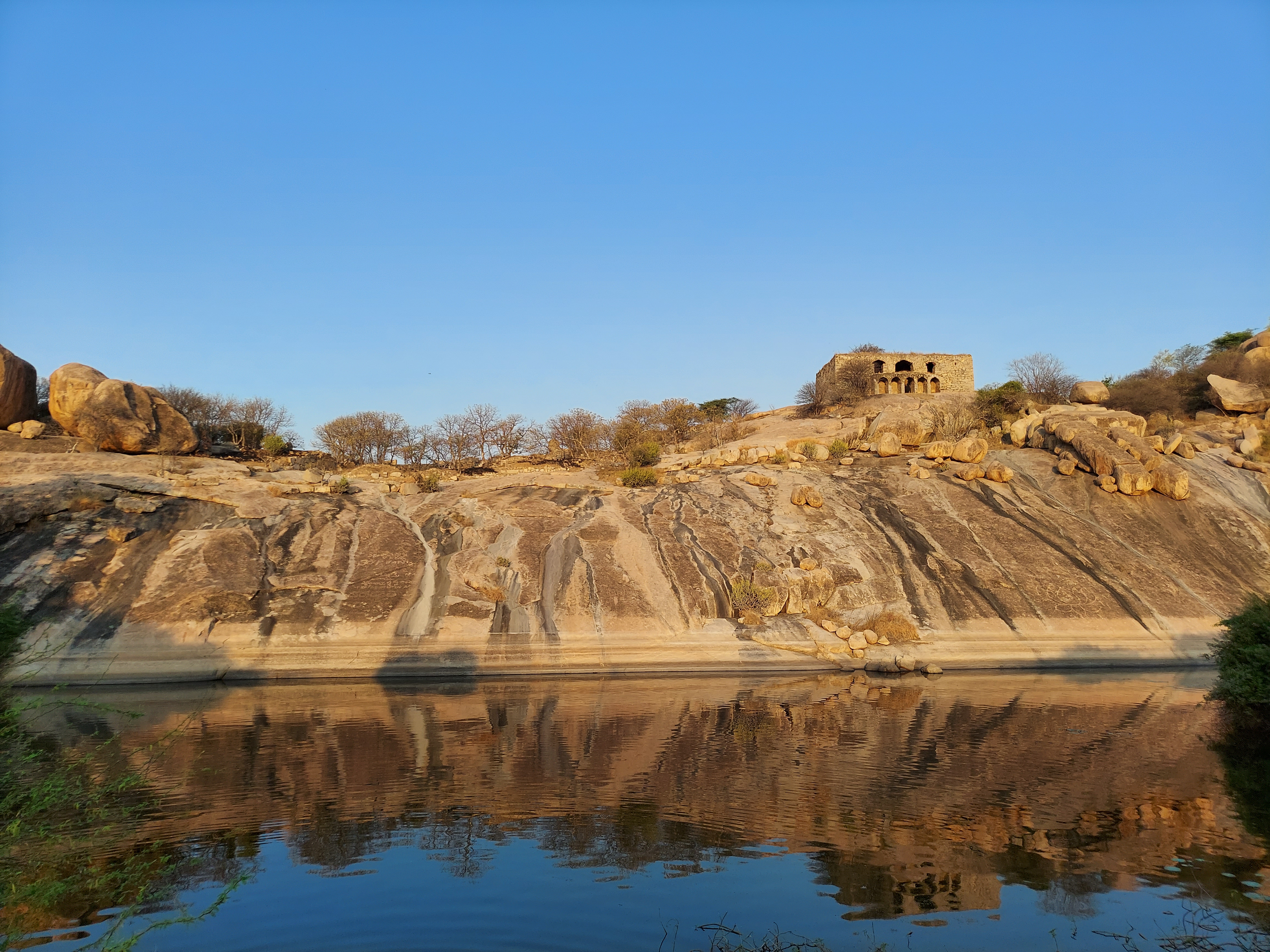
Devarakonda Fort

The political situation in Telangana provided an opportunity for the Gajapati army to intervene and conquer the territory. The Velama rulers of Devarakonda in Telangana and the Bahmani Sultan 'Ala-ud-Din Ahmad Shah had cordial relations in the initial stages but on the event of war between the Vijayanagara Empire and the Bahmani Sultanate, the Velama rulers backed the Bahmani Sultanate and sought to fight the Vijayanagara Empire. In an act of revenge the Bahmani sultan invaded the Telegana region and the Bahmani commander Sanjar Khan extracted vengeance on the common people. Native Hindus were sold as slaves. In 1456 CE, Humayun Shah ascended the throne of the Bahmani sultanate and his general Sikander Khan suppressed the rebel Velama chiefs after occupying Devarakonda. Kapilendra Deva was invited by the Velama chiefs to rescue them from the Bahmani sultans. In 1458 CE, a battle ensued at Devarakonda between Odia forces led by Prince Hamvira Deva and the Bahmani forces. As a result of this battle Odia forces came out victorious and Telangana region became a feudal state of the Gajapati empire with the Velama chiefs as the vassal rulers. The victory over the Bahmani Sultanate forces at Devarakonda in 1458 CE enabled Kapilendra Deva to assume the title of Kalavargēśvara which meant the Lord of Kalaburagi.

=== Invasion of Bidar ===
Bidar Fort

In 1461, Kapilendra Deva orchestrated a significant military campaign during the reign of Nizam-ud-Din Ahmad Shah Bahmani III. The primary aim of this strategic maneuver was to capture Berar, with a specific focus on the town of Achalpur in what is now modern-day Maharashtra. Backed by Kakatiya chiefs, Kapilendra Deva led his forces into a consequential military confrontation against the Bahmani Sultanate. Despite their initial intentions, the Gajapati forces, under Kapilendra Deva's leadership had to retreat. This sudden withdrawal stemmed from Jaunpur Sultan Husain Sharqi's invasion of Odisha. After capturing Tirhut, he sent detachments to conquer Odisha. This compelled Kapilendra to retract from Bahmani territories, compelling him to seek peace. This turn of events forced the surrender of the Gajapati forces. The outcome of this campaign, set against the backdrop of Nizam Shah Bahmani's rule, left a lasting imprint on the historical tapestry of the region, shaping the narrative of Kapilendra Deva's military endeavors.

=== Subjugation of the Vijayanagara Empire and Expansion ===
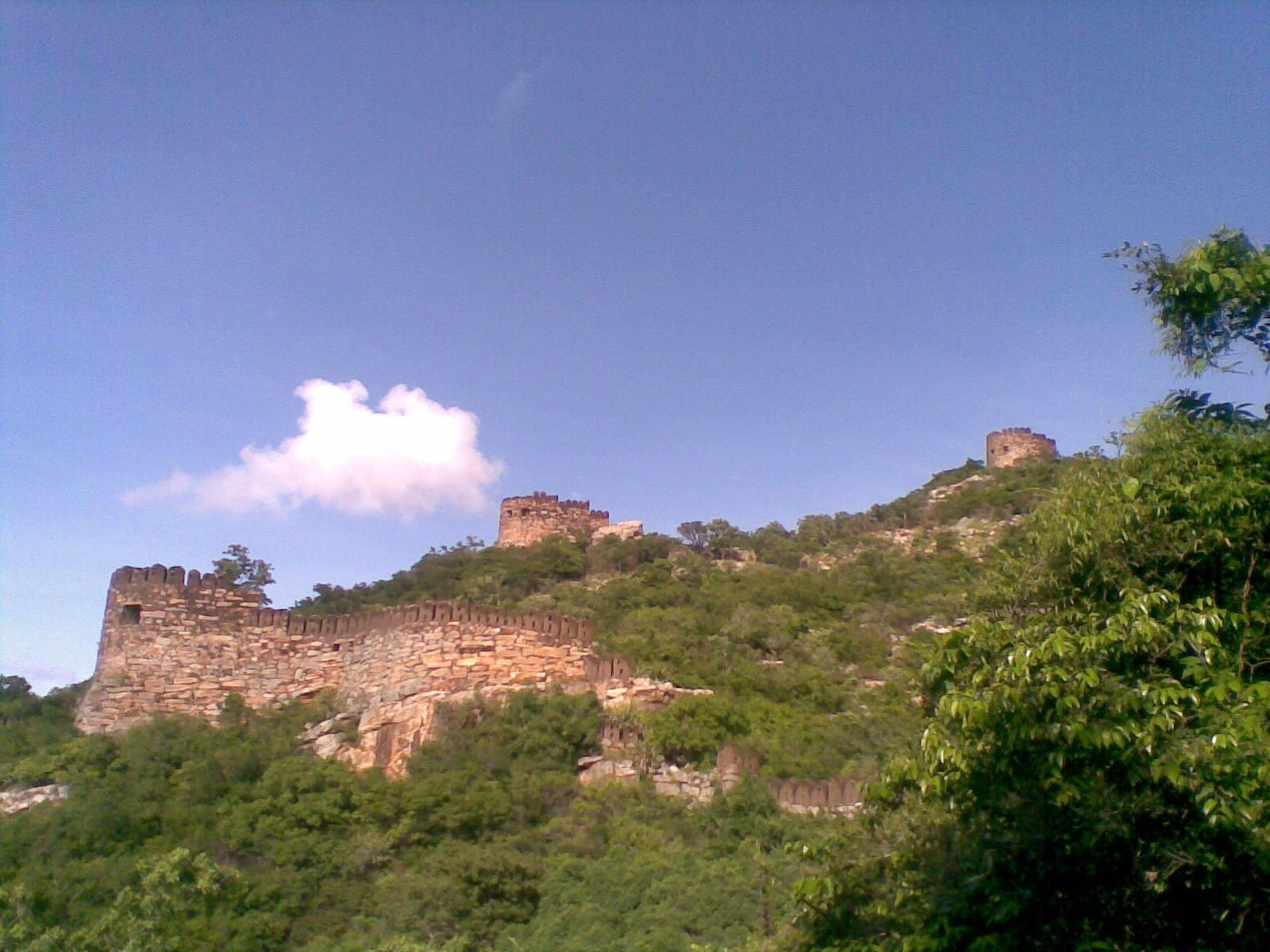
Udayagiri Fort situated in Nellore district was first built by the conquering forces of Kapilendra Deva as the military headquarters of his Gajapati empire's southern territories.

From the documents of the Gangadasa Bilasa Charitam, it is known that Kapilendra Deva ordered prince Hamvira Deva to conquer Vijayanagara Empire and the Bahmani Sultanate. Hamvira Deva successfully captured the imperial capital city of Vijayanagara and forced it's weak emperor Mallikarjuna Raya to pay yearly tribute. Hamvira Deva's general Tamavupala conquered the southern states of Udayagiri and Chandragiri in the year 1460 CE. The inscriptions of Shrirangam Temple near Tiruchirappalli dictate that Hamvira Deva conquered as far as Tiruchirappalli, Thanjavur and Arcot in south before stopping his advance. Hamvira Deva's son Dakshina Kapileswara Kumara became the governor of the southernmost territories of Chandragiri in the year 1464 CE after its conquest.

By 1464 CE, Kapilendra Deva was the undisputed master of an empire stretching from the Gaṅgā in the north to Tiruchirappalli in the south along the coast. Thus he could proudly assume the imperial titles of Gajapati Gauḍēśvara Navakōṭi Karṇāṭa Kalavargēśvara with due justification. According to the historian R. C. Majumdar, Kapilendra Deva was the most powerful Hindu monarch of his time and under him Odisha became an empire stretching from the lower Ganga in the north to the Kaveri in the south. The Gopinathpur inscription aptly describes his position in 1464 CE:

Kṛtvā saṃyati Māḷāvendra-jayinaṃ senādhināthaṃ tu yaṃ Gauḍendrasya nitāntam Utkala-patha-prasthāna rodhārgaḷaṃ Śrīkhaṃṇḍādri payodharopāri karaṃ nirmāya Sānaṃdaṃ Kapileśvaro viharate Karṇāṭa-rājya-śriyā

== Imperial consolidation ==
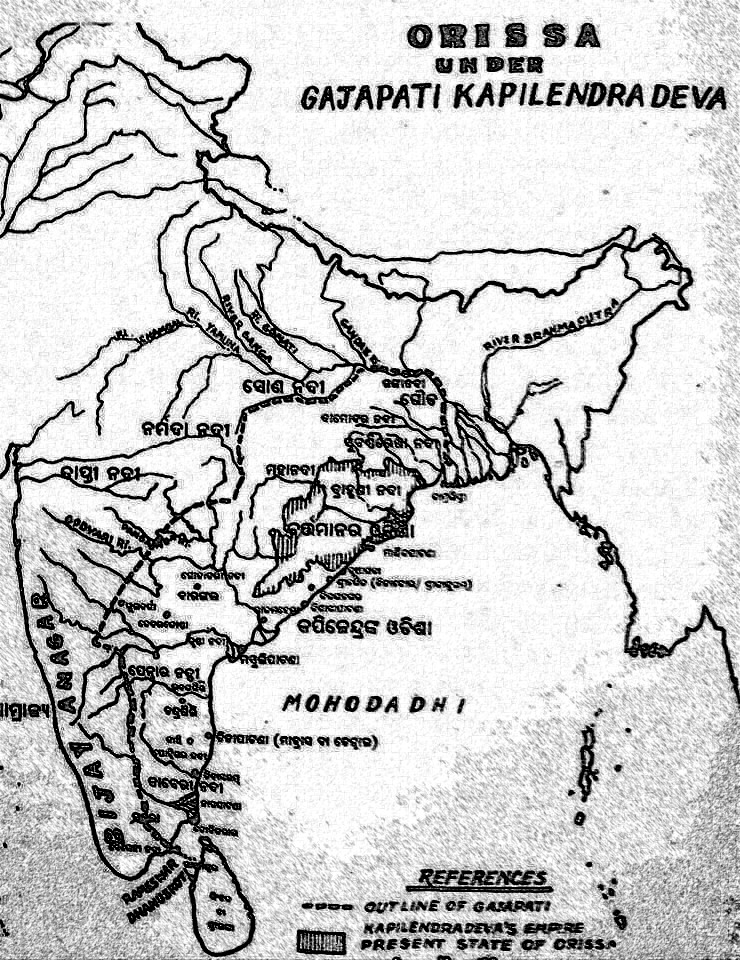
Extent of Odisha under Kapilendra Deva

The Gajapati Empire which reached its height in 1464 CE under Kapilendra Deva was organised into two administrative divisions of Dandapata and Rajya. Most of the core regions of the empire in the north came under his direct control which were divided into Dandapathas (the division continuing from the Eastern Gangas) under a Governor (parikśa) or were controlled by the feudatory Samanta rajas. The southern parts of the empire were divided into Rajyas which were ruled by Governors.

== Construction and Culture ==
Kapilendra Deva patronized Vaishnavite Hinduism and expanded the Jagannath temple at Puri. Although his entire life was spent in warfare, the Jagannath temple became the center for an efflorescence of drama and dance (Odissi) and other forms of art during Gajapati rule. He was a great patron of Vedic culture and himself wrote a Sanskrit play called Parshuram Bijaya. He constructed the Shaivite Hindu Kapilesvara Temple in Bhubaneswar which displays his tolerance towards every sectarian belief under the Hindu domain. It was during the rule of Kapilendra Deva when Odia was officially used as an administrative language and the poet Sarala Das wrote the Odia Mahabharata. Several learned poets and writers were promoted by him. Sanskrit poets also flourished during this era like Visvanatha Kaviraja who wrote Sahitya Darpana and Chandrakala Natika along with other works, Narsingha Mishra Vajapeyi wrote Samksepasariraka vartika and Kalidasa Chayani wrote Suddhichandrika.

Kapilendra Deva had declared himself as a servant-ruler of the Lord Jagannath which is also reflected in his regnal title Routaray meaning the Lord's servant-king. The Narendra tank in the Puri Jagannath temple premises was constructed by Kapilendra Deva in the memory of his martyred younger brother, Veer Narendra Deva. Fourteen out of sixteen ghats of the tank are named after his fourteen nephews. The two concentric defensive stone walls known as Kurma Prachira (the inner wall measuring 400’ x 278’) and Meghanada Prachira (the outer wall measuring 665’ x 644’ with height varying from 20’ to 24’) were constructed during the reign of Kapilendra Deva. The Chandan Jatra festival of Lord Jagannath was initiated during his rule. He himself donated a large amount of jewelry and utensils to the Puri temple during the 41 anka of his rule. The Gajapati pledged to donate equal amount of wealth and rights to the Brahmins. He ordered the abolition of Chaukidari tax paid by Brahmins previously and also banned the resumption of waste and pasture lands. He had ordered his officials to follow the path of justice, righteousness and Hindu spiritual teachings and had warned them that they will face the punishment of exile if they failed to do so. During his rule, two Dadhivamana temples were constructed, one each in the village of Kaunrpur and Gopinathpur in Cuttack district. Kapilendra Deva was a builder of a welfare state and had ordered not to commit atrocities or impose excessive hardships on the people of his empire.

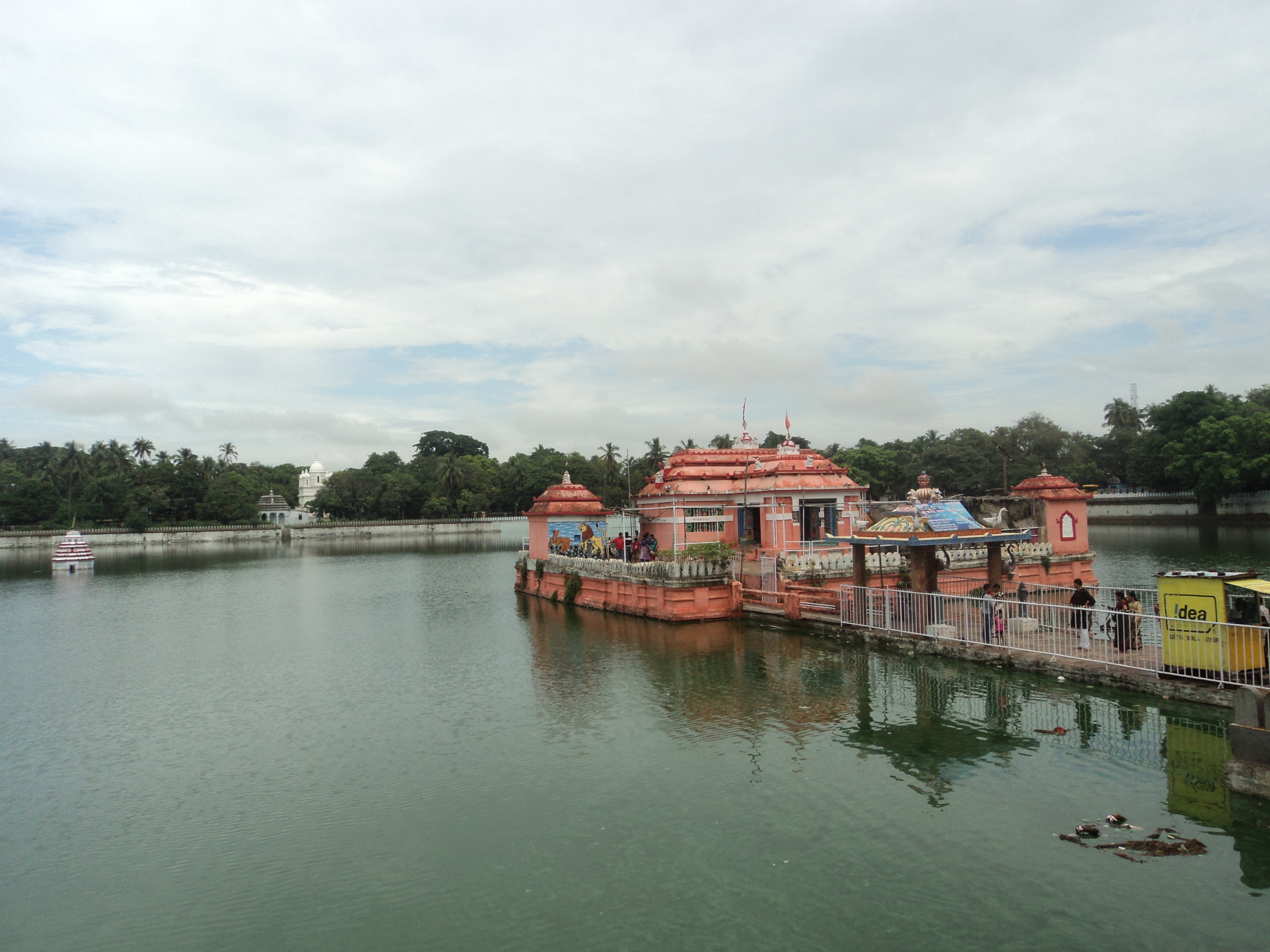
Narendra Tank, Puri (dug during the rule of Kapilendra Deva)

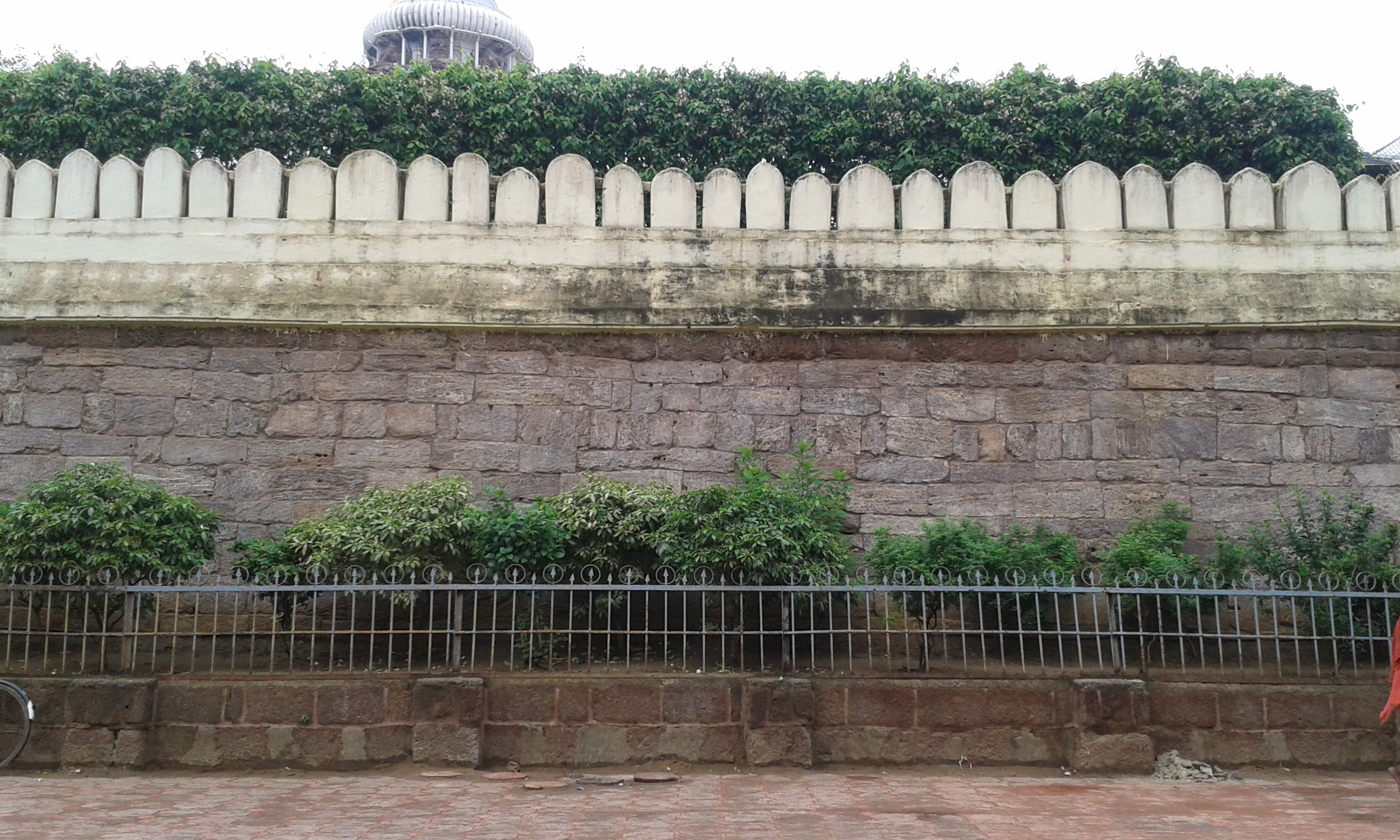
Meghanada wall fortifying the Jagannath Temple, Puri (constructed during the rule of Kapilendra Deva)

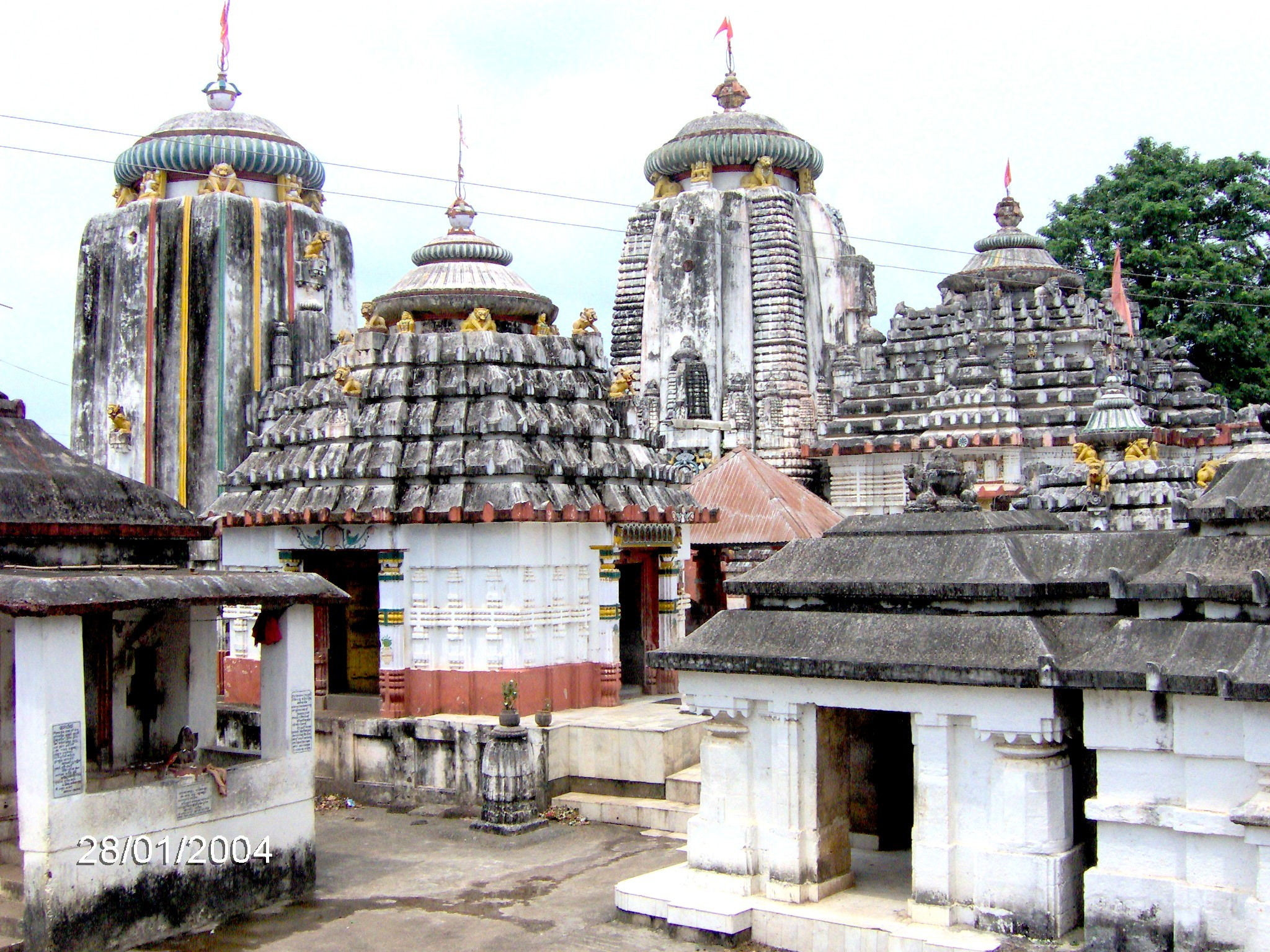
Kapileswar Temple, Old Bhubaneswar (built during Kapilendra Deva)

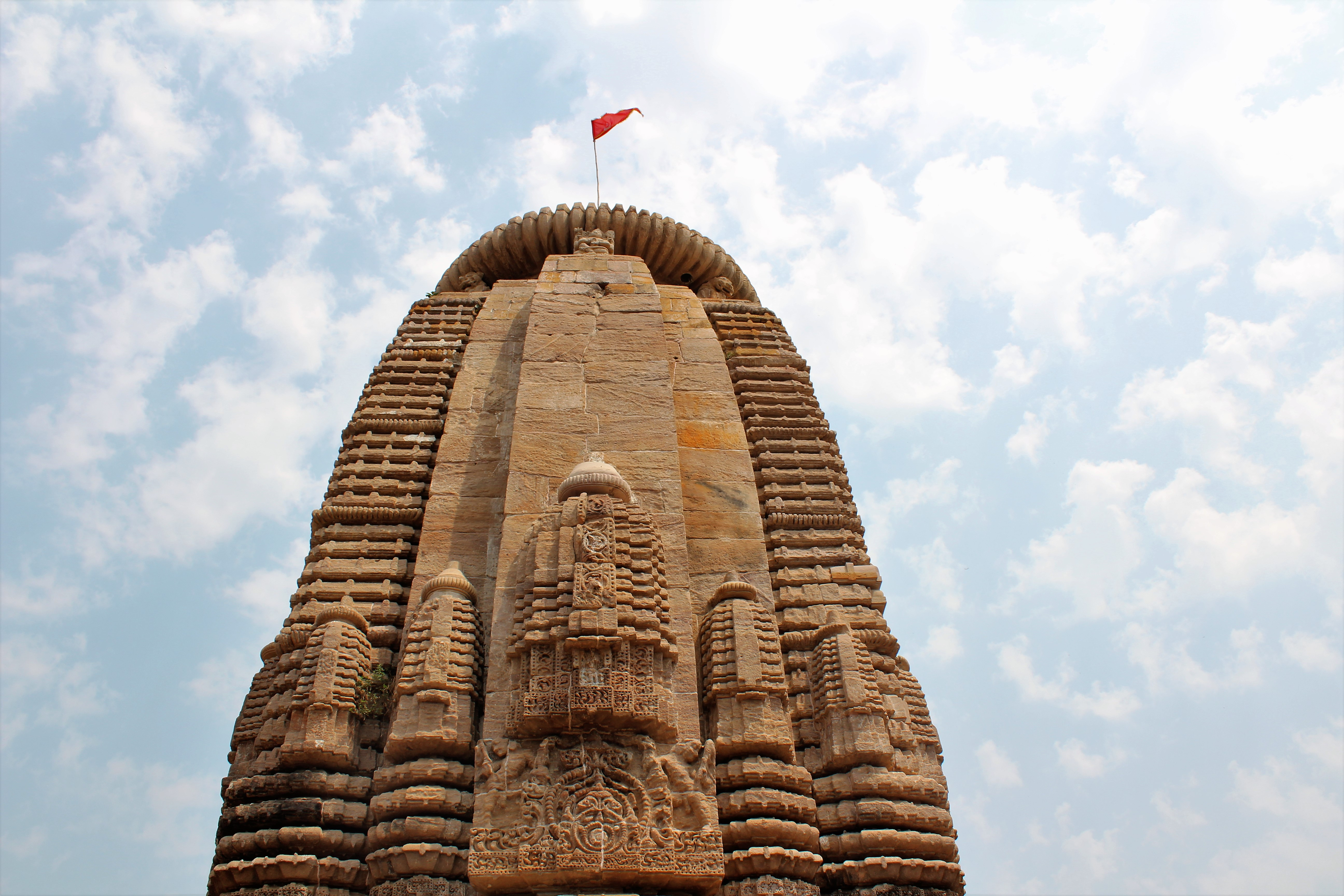
Kapilesvara Temple, Bhubaneswar

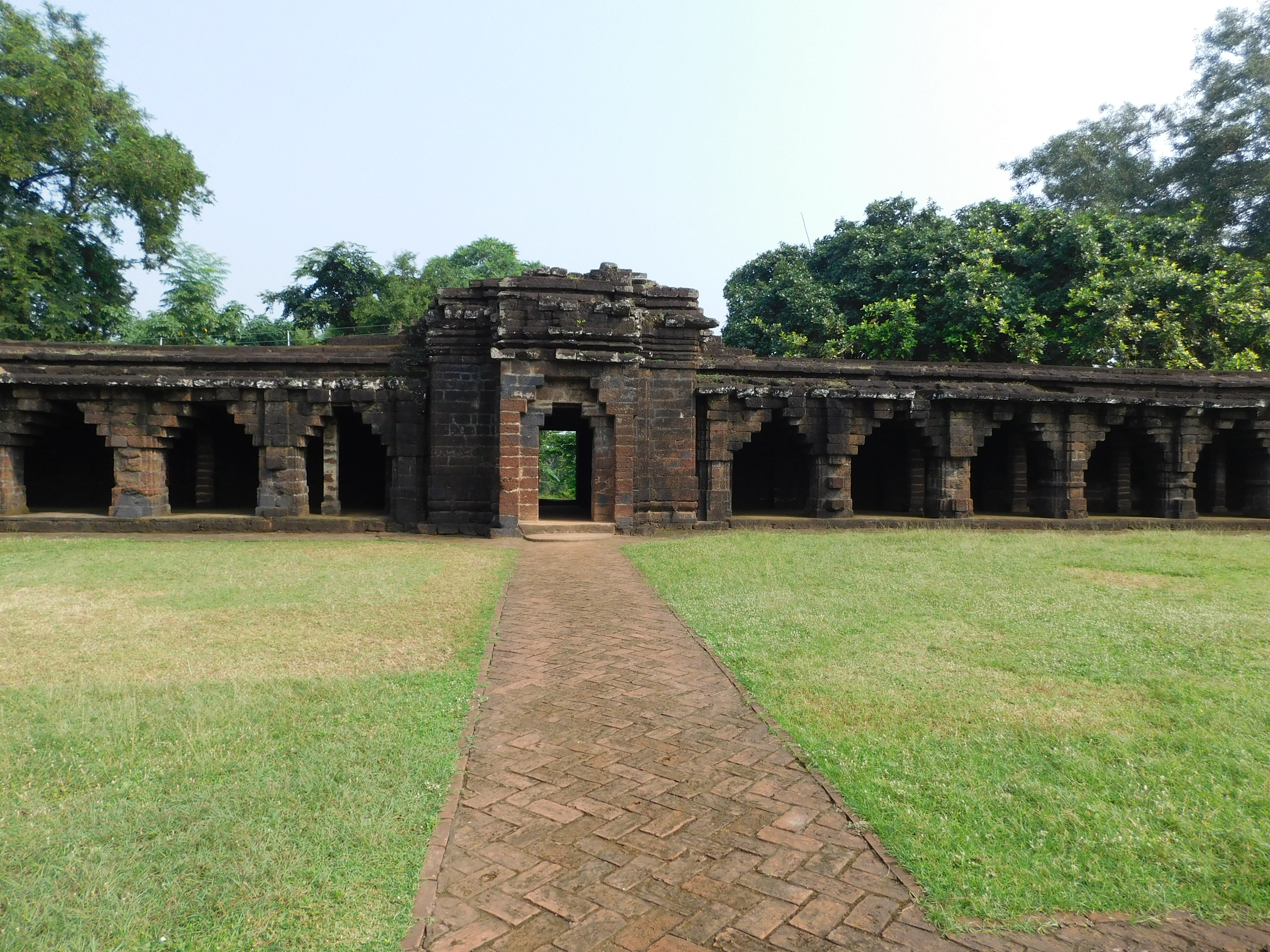
Kurumbera Fort (Kuruma Bedha), compound built during the rule of Kapilendra Deva Routray

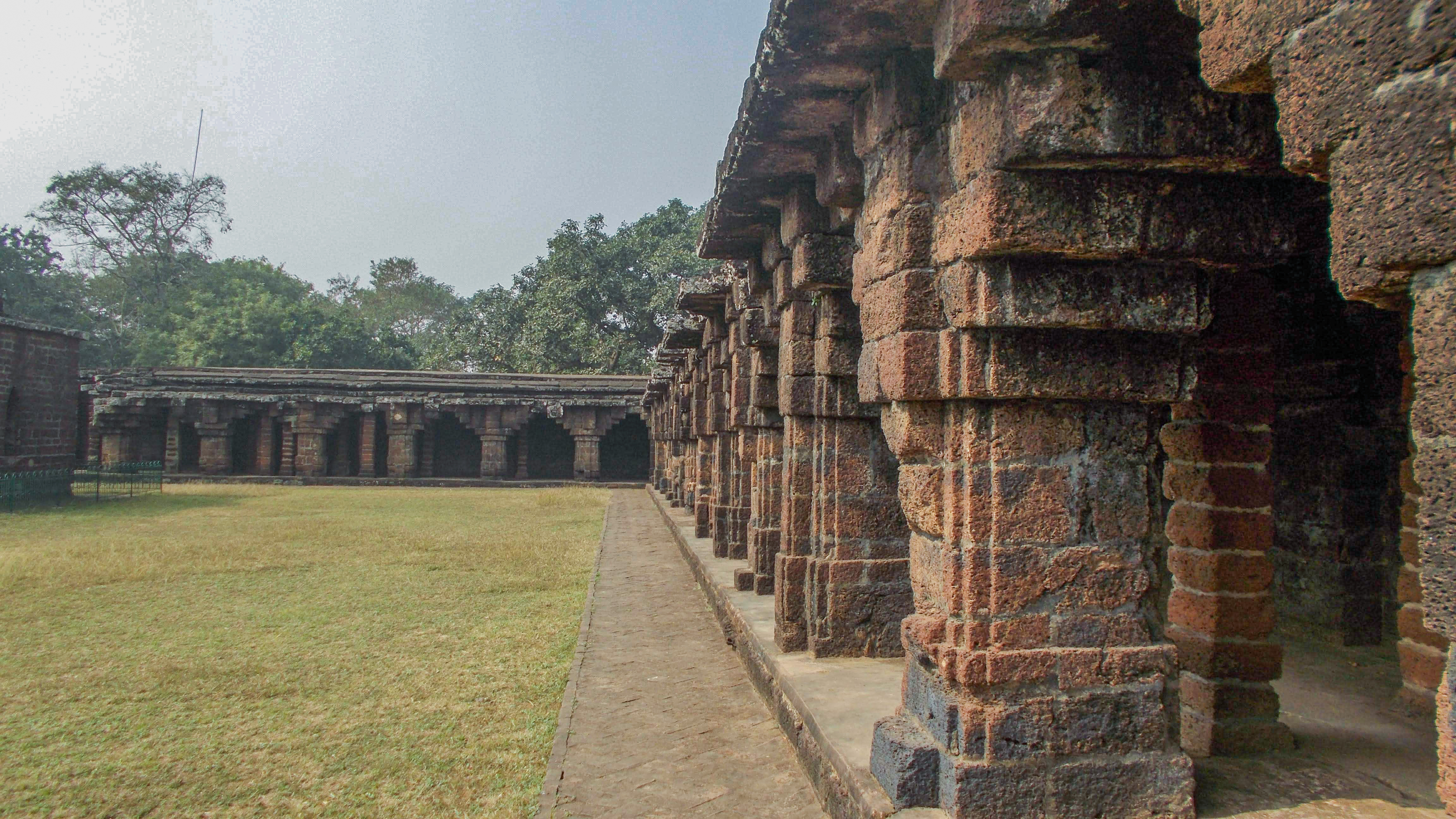
Kurumbera Fort, Keshiari, West Bengal

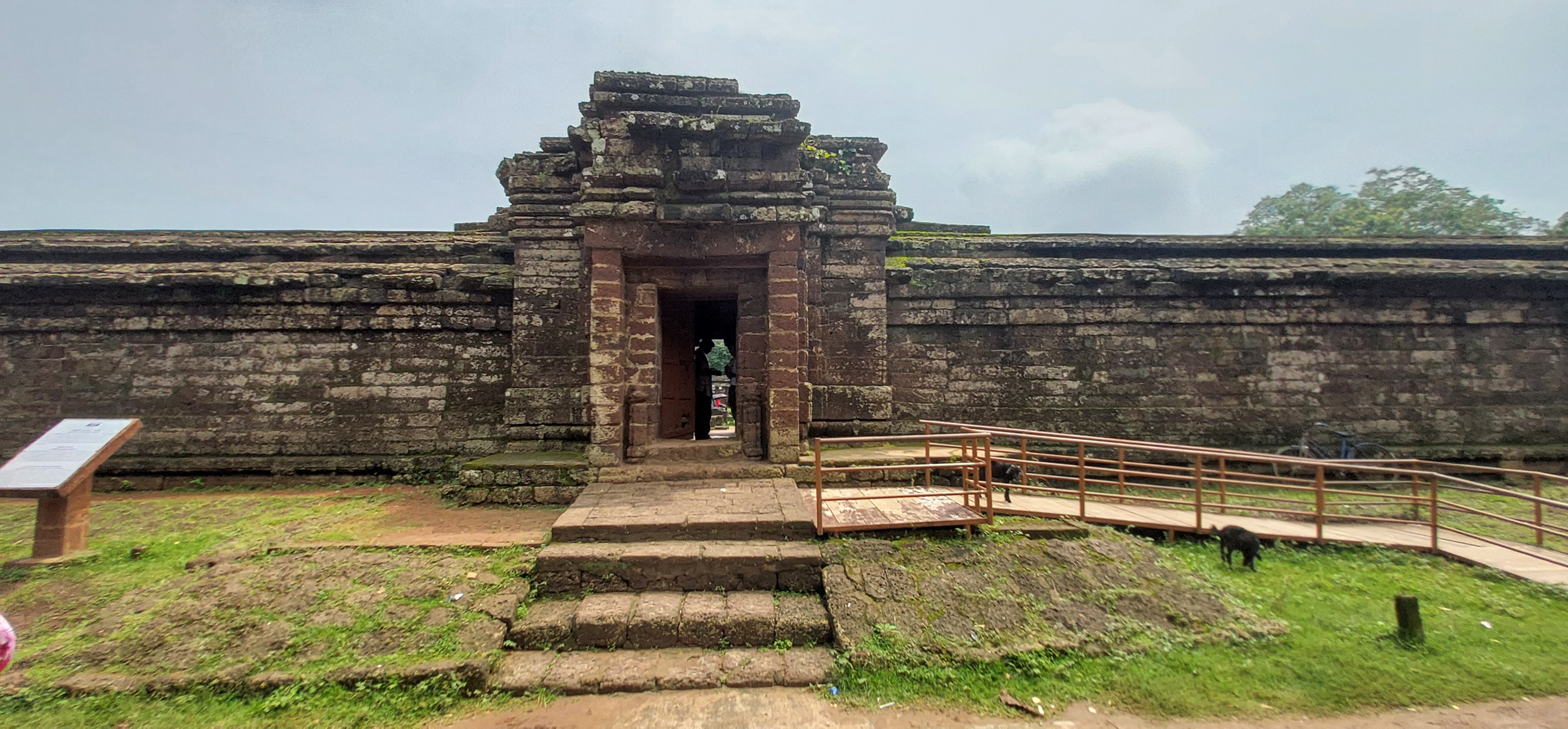
Kurumbera Fort, medieval heritage structure in Gaganeshwar village, West Medinipur

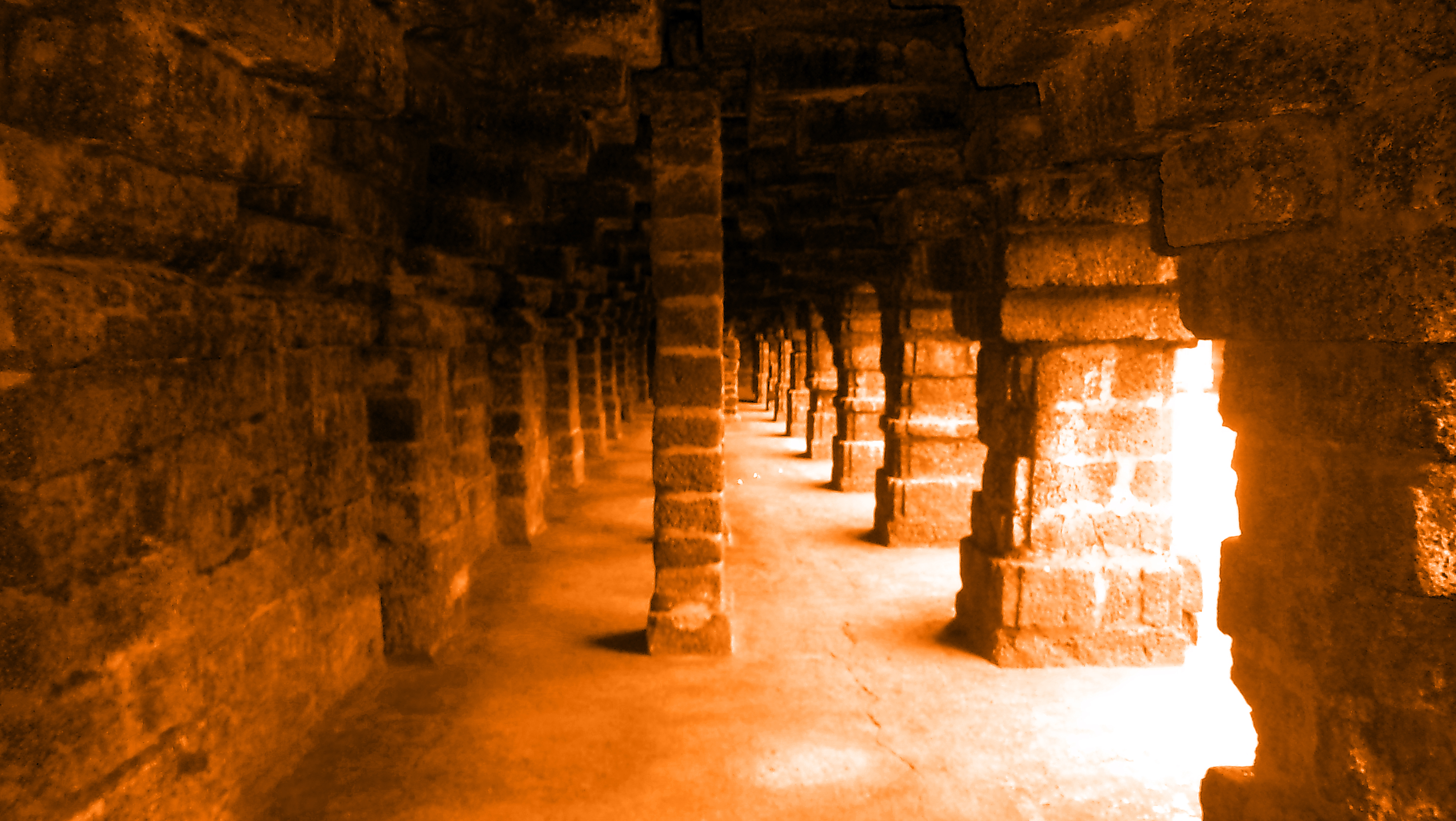
Chambers of Kurumbera Fort, Gaganeshwar

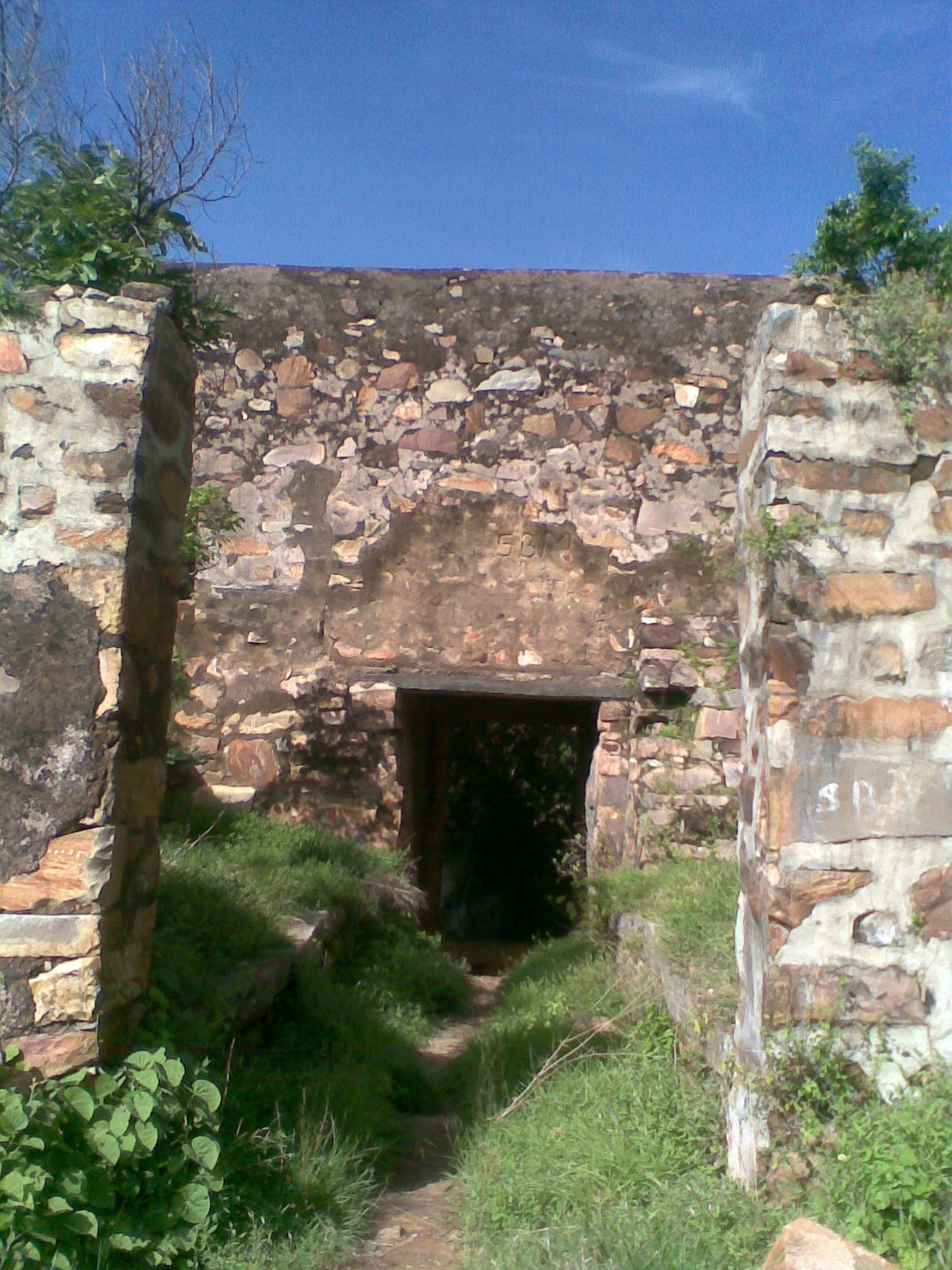
Udayagiri Fort, Nellore, Andhra Pradesh

== Notes ==
Kapilendra Deva Suryavamsa dynasty
Regnal titles
Preceded by Bhanu Deva IV	Gajapati of Odisha; 1434–1467	Succeeded by Purushottama Deva
