= Bhandara Ghara Shrine =

Coordinates: 20.229072°N 85.827511°E

Bhandara Ghara Shrine (Lat- 200 15’ 53" N., Long- 850 51’ 40" E., Elev- 56 ft.) is located in the Kapilesvara temple precinct. It is a living temple facing towards east. It enshrines the chalanti pratima (movable deities) of Vishnu and Shiva. These deities are taken on procession on various festive occasions for public viewing. It was built around 16th century A.D.

== Physical description ==
=== Surrounding ===
The temple is surrounded by a Kapilesvara temple in the north at a distance of 2.96 metres, compound wall in the west at a distance of 5.00 metres, Daksina Kali temple in the south at a distance of 0.90 metres and Beharana Mandapa on the eastern side.

=== Orientation ===
It is facing towards east.

=== Architectural features (Plan and Elevation) ===
The temple rests on a low pista measuring 3.75 metres in length and 4.80 metres in width with a height of 0.25 metres. On plan, the temple has a square sanctum measuring 4.80 square metres. On elevation, the vimana is of pidha order that measures 5.22 metres in height from pabhaga to the kalasa. From bottom to the top the temple has bada, gandi and mastaka. With fivefold division the bada measures 2.22 metres. At the bottom pabhaga 0.64 metres, talajangha 0.45 metres, upara jangha 0.65 metres, bandhana 0.20 metres and baranda 0.48 metres in height. The gandi measuring 2.50 metres in height has nine receding tiers set in two potalas separated by a recess kanthi. The lower potala has five 179 tiers and upper potala has four tiers. The mastaka as usual in Orissan temple has components like khapuri, kalasa measuring 0.50 metres in height.

=== Raha niche & parsva devatas ===
The raha niche on three sides uniformly measures 0.53 metres in height x 0.63 metres in width and 0.11 metres in depth are empty.

Classification	Grade
Architecture	B
Historic	C
Associational	C
Social/Cultural	C

=== Threats to the property ===
Three detached sculptures are there near the eastern wall of the sanctum. A two armed Ganesa image is holding modaka patra in his left hand and right is in abhaya mudra, standing on a lotus pedestal. A four armed Laxmi image is holding lotus in her both uplifted hands while her right hand is in abhaya mudra left hand is resting on her lap. A Saraswati image is sitting on a lotus pedestal.
