= Mahur Fort =

Fort by Nanded, Maharashtra, India

Mahurgad/ Mahur Fort
- माहूरगड
- Part of Balaghat Hill Range
- Nanded district, Maharashtra
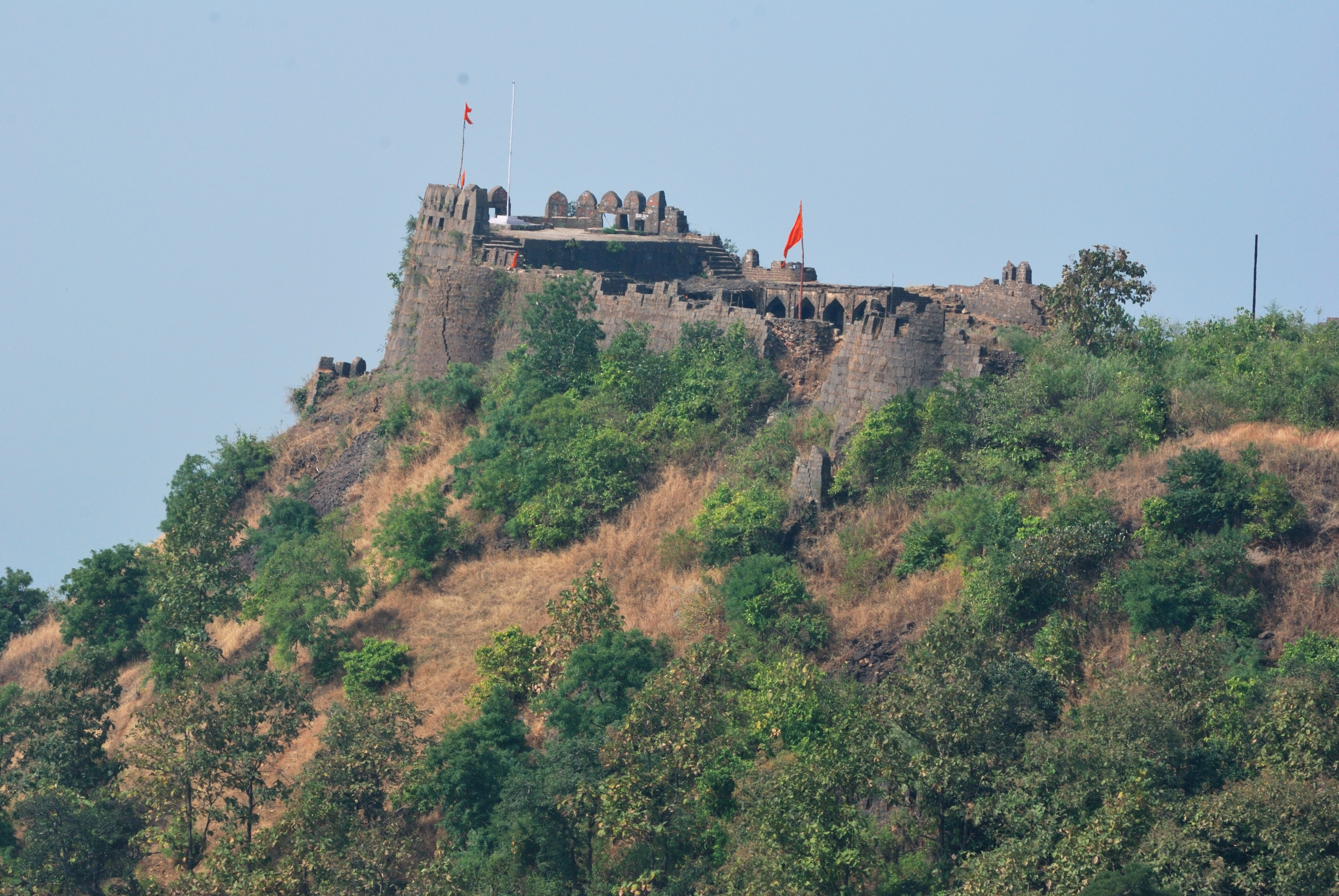

Site information
- Type: Hill fort
- Owner: Government
- Controlled by: gond kingdom Bahmani Sultanate (1358-1527); Ahmadnagar Sultanate (1527-1617); Mughal Empire(1617-1670); Maratha Empire (1670-1689); Mughal Empire(1689-1724); Nizam of Hyderabad(1724-1948); India (1947-)
- Open to the public: Yes
- Condition: Ruined

Location
- Shown within Maharashtra Mahurgad/ Mahur Fort (India)
- Coordinates: 19°50′09.5″N 77°55′32.5″E
- Height: 2650 Ft

Site history
- Materials: Basalt Stone

Mahurgad Fort (Marathi: माहूरगड) is a fort located 130 km (81 mi) from Nanded. The fort is in Mahur taluka in Nanded district, of Maharashtra. It is a pilgrimage centre of great significance to Hindus. It is the seat of goddess Renukadevi which is a shrine of Shakta pitha. The temple of goddess is situated 2 km from the village Mahur.

== History ==
It existed before the Yadav period. This fort was ruled by the Gond king. This fort is also known as Giridurg Gond Fort by of Devgiri. 1n 1358, the fort was under the rule of Muhamad Shah Bahamani. In 1398, a Gond King from Berar captured Mahur. In 1428, Ahmed Shah Bahamani won the Mahurgad. Burhan Nizam Shah of Ahmadnagar defeated Alauddin Imad Shah of Berar in 1527 and occupied Mahur. In 1617, the Mughal Emperor Shah Jahan defeated the Ahmednagar rulers and gained control of the Fort. Pandita Savitribai Deshmukh was the ruler of Varhad, who was holding the Jagir of Mahur during the Mughal Empire rule. She was given honorary name of Rai Bagan ( Royal tigress) (Marathi: रायबागन) by Mughal Emperor Aurangzeb after defeating Harchandrai. In 1670, Chatrapati Shivaji gained the control of Aurangabad and Berar. After the death of Shivaji, the Moghuls again gained the control of Berar in 1689. The six-month revenue during Moghul period was Rs 8,47,113. In 1724, Nizam-ul-mulk of Hyderabad defeated Alam Ali Khan and Dilavar Khan of Mughal Army in the Battle of Balapur. The Mahurgad remained under the control of Nizam of Hyderabad until the princely State of Hyderabad was annexed to Union of India in 1948.

== Architecture ==
The fort and the temple are accessible in all seasons. The nearest rail head is Kinwat which is 50 km from Mahur. The Mahur village is connected by motorable road. There are two trek routes to Mahurgad, starts from temple of Renukadevi located on the hillock south of village Mahur. It takes about 20 minutes to reach the fort entrance. There is also another route from Kinwat, but it passes through dense jungles. It takes another hour to visit the entire fort. The fortification covers a circumference of six miles and runs over two adjacent hills. There is a tank constructed between the hills called Injala or Brahmatirth. The entrance of the fort is through massive and lofty entrance gate called Hathi Darwaja (Elephant Gate). There are few dilapidated buildings, a Chini mahal, granaries, water cisterns, causeways and massive bastions inside the forts. However major portion of the fort is covered with wild bushes and trees. Near the entrance gate, there is a Mahakali temple which is often visited by pilgrims. On the day of Dasera every year a big fair is organized at Mahurgad. The Painganga River flows around the fort hill.

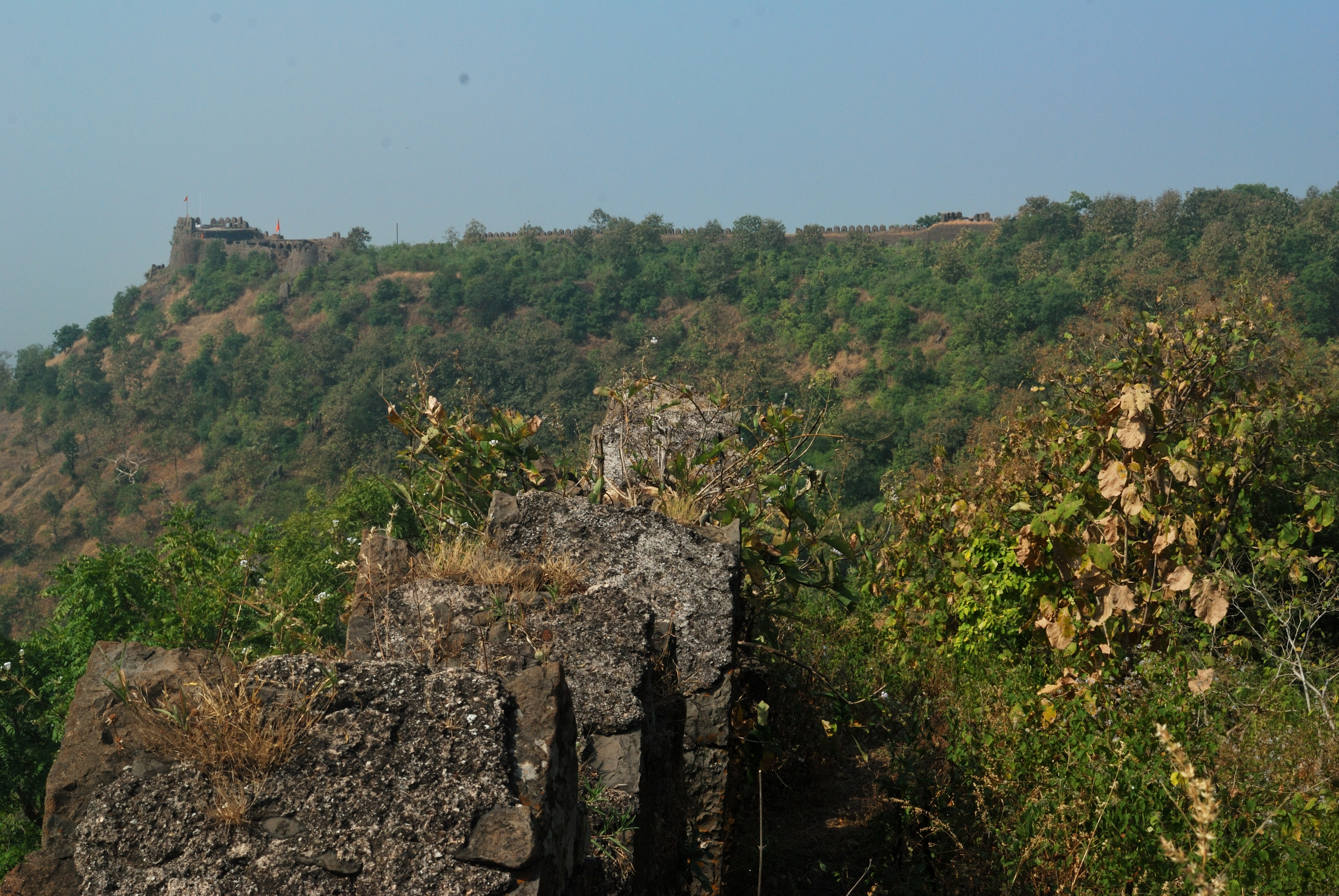
Mahur Fort

== See also ==
- List of forts in Maharashtra
- List of forts in India
- Marathi People
