= Kapilesvara Siva Temple =

Kapilesvara Siva temple
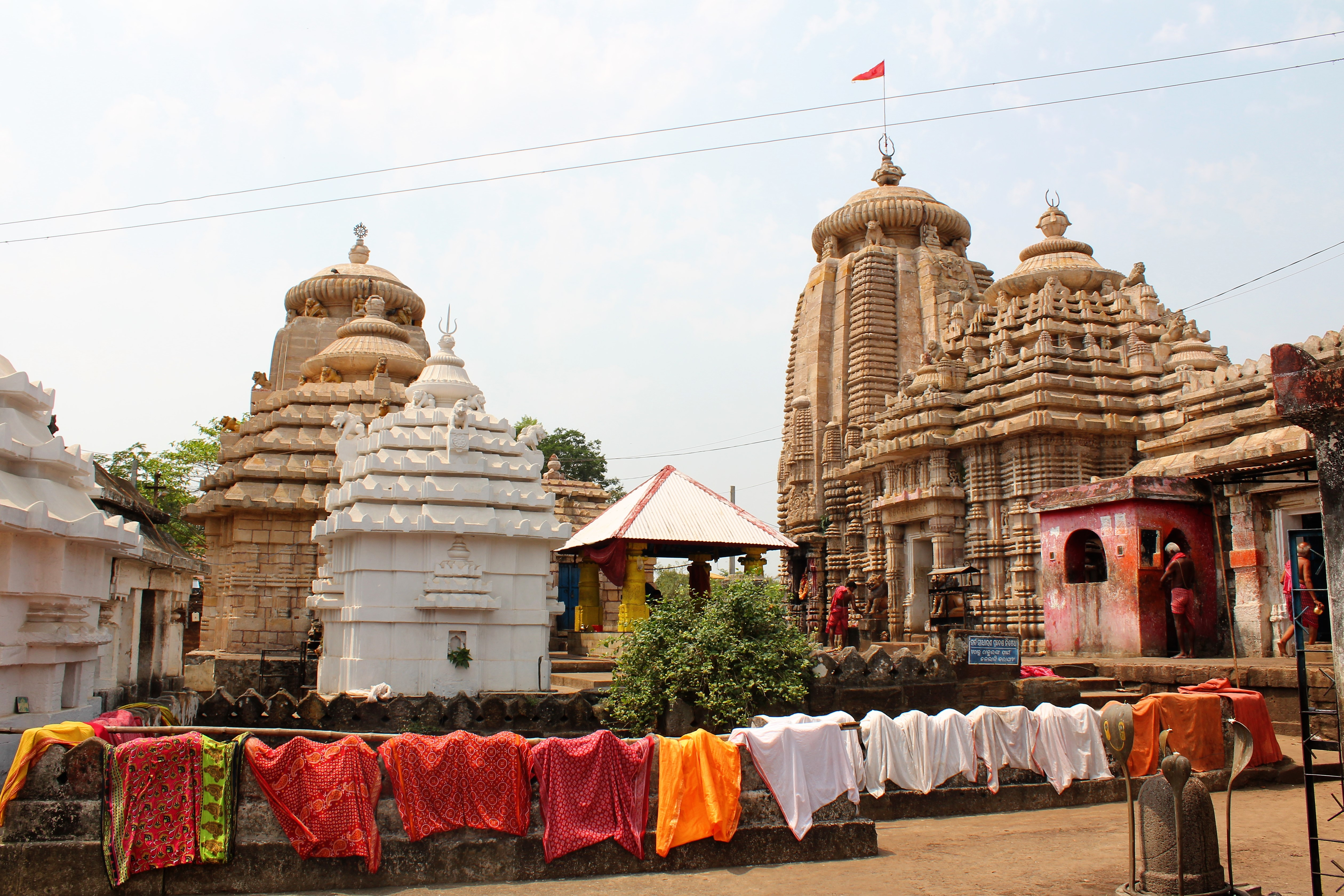

- Location in Orissa Kapilesvara Siva Temple (Odisha)

Religion
- Affiliation: Hinduism
- Deity: Shiva

Location
- Location: Bhubaneswar
- State: Odisha
- Country: India
- Coordinates: 20.22909°N 85.827438°E

Architecture
- Type: Kalingan Style (Kalinga Architecture)
- Completed: 14th century CE
- Elevation: 14 m (46 ft)

The Kapilesvara Siva temple is a Hindu temple dedicated to Shiva located in the south western outskirt of the village Kapilesvara, Old Town, Bhubaneswar, Odisha, India. It is located at the end of Kapilesvara road leading from Lingaraj temple to Kapilesvara Village. The presiding deity is a Siva-lingam at the center of a circular yonipitha inside the sanctum. It is a living temple, facing towards east and maintained by Kapilesvara Temple Trust Board. The temple is situated within the precinct along with 33 other monuments. The precinct is located on the northern embankment of Manikarnika tank over an area of 44.00 square metres.

== Tradition and legends ==
According to the local legend this is the birthplace of Lord Shiva, who is considered as father of the Universe. He is also seen as the brain child of Brahma, an incarnation of Vishnu and Lord Shiva himself. Hence, it is a sacred place where the shrine is dedicated to Lord Shiva.

== The Temple ==
The dominant feature of the temple is the 60-foot (18 m) high temple and its adjacent pond, surrounded by stone steps. The temple is a satellite of the main temple in Bhubaneswar, the Lingaraj temple. Both temples, like other temples in India are centres of social, political, and educational activities. Until the middle of the 20th century, the temple dominated the economic, political and ritual life of the place. The temple was built during 14th Century CE during Gajapati rule of Kapilendra Deva. Inscription of Kapilendra deva and other architectural sculptural fragments suggest the original temple could be earlier than 11th century CE.

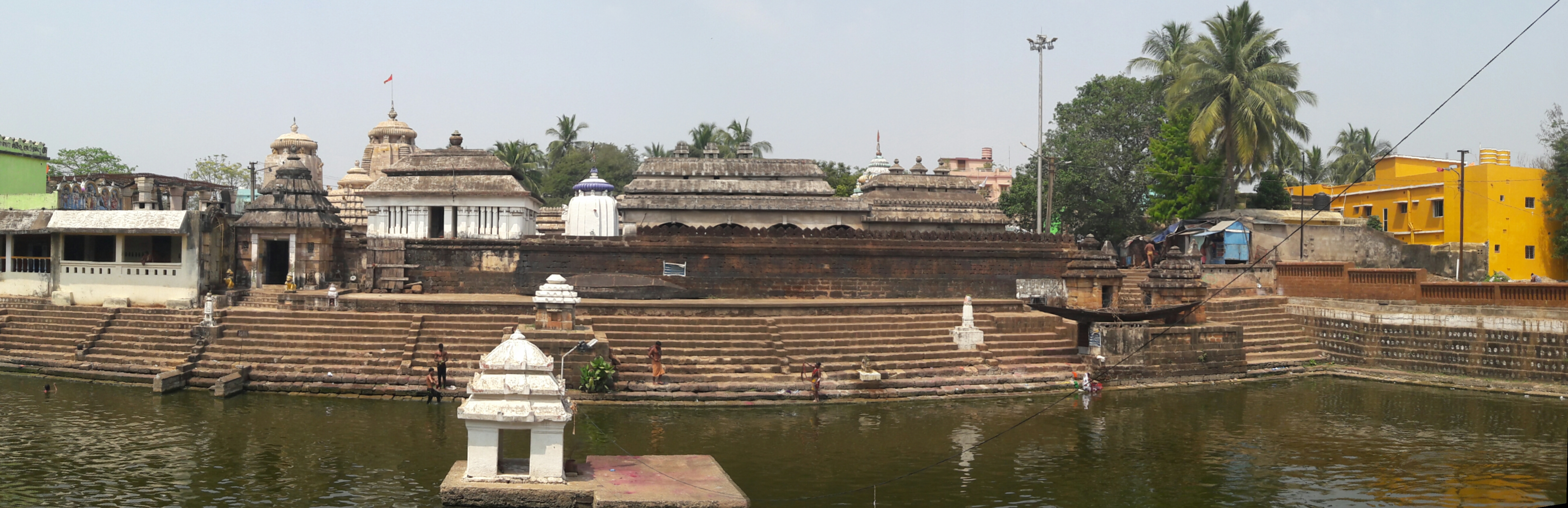

== Architectural features ==
The entire temple was renovated at a later date with the building materials of the original one. The temple has a vimana (shrine), jagamohana, nata-mandira and bhoga-Mandapa. The vimana is in rekha order, jagamohana is pidha and nata-mandira and bhoga mandapa (hall) are flat roofed and of later constructions. The vimana (shrine) measuring 11.40 metres (37.4 ft) in height has usual bada, gandi and mastaka. The lower potala has five tiers and the upper poatala has four tiers in pyramidal elevation.

The parsvadevata (other deities) niches located on the raha paga of the tala jangha on the three sides of north, west and south and enshrine Parvati, Kartikeya and Ganesha respectively. The Talagarvika below the niche is decorated with a series of Khakhara mundis flanked by naga nagi pilasters. The niche is flanked by two pilasters that are carved with Kirtimukha at the center of the pilaster and the niche is crowned by Urdhagarvika. The western raha niche houses four armed Kartikeya standing in tribhanga over a lotus pedestal with his upper left hand is holding a cattle drum, the upper right hand is holding a trident and while the major left hand is holding a cock and right hand is in varadamudra. The image is crowned by jatamukuta and at the corners there are flying Vidyadharas and diminutive male worshipers at the base of the pedestal. The northern raha niche houses a four-armed Parvati standing over a lotus pedestal. The image is partly damaged. She is holding lotus in her major left hand and naga pasa in the uplifted left hand, major right hand is in varada mudra and the uplifted right hand is broken. Flanked by two diminutive female attendants holding sakti, the image has jatamukuta. The southern raha niche enshrines a four-armed Ganesha standing in tribhanga over a pedestal. His right hand is holding an akhyamala (rosary), left hand a Parasu while the uplifted left hand is holding a Modaka patra the uplifted right hand holds a tusk. The image has a Jatamukuta.

At the Lalatabimba there is a Gajalakshmi seated in lalitasana over a lotus pedestal. She holds lotus in her both hands; above the lotus two elephants are pouring water over the deity. At the base of the doorjambs and beneath the dvara sakhas there are two pidha mundi niches that house Saivate dvarapalas along with river goddesses of the Ganges and Yamuna mounted over their respective mounts.

== Adi Kapilesvara Shrine ==
Adi kapilesvara Siva Temple is located in the Kapileswara temple precinct and it is a living temple and facing west. The enshrined deity is a Siva lingam within a circular yonipitha (basement) made of black chlorite. The temple is surrounded by the precinct compound wall in east, Ghanteswar temple in west and Baidyanath temple in south. The temple has a vimana (shrine) depicting pancha ratha (five chariots) and a frontal porch. The gandi of the temple has set in three receding tiers. The mastaka consists of beki, ghanta, amlaka, khapuri, kalasa and ayudha.

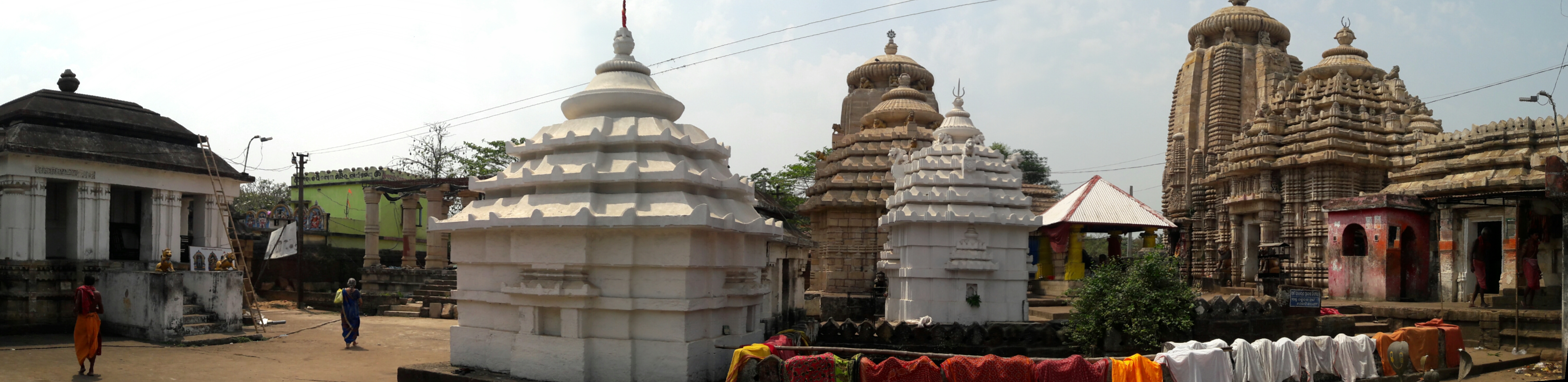

== Baidyanatha Siva Temple ==
The Baidyanatha Siva temple (Lat- 200 13’ 74" N., Long- 850 49’ 65" E., Elev- 45 ft (14 m)) is located in Kapilesvara temple precinct and the enshrined deity is a Siva lingam over a circular "yonipitha" (basement), made in sandstone. The temple is under the care and maintenance of Kapilesvara Temple Trust Board. According to local legend Lord Baidyanath is the god for curing ailments and diseases. So ailing people offer special prayer and surrender before the Lord when suffering from diseases. It was built around 18th century. The temple is facing towards west. There is an inscription on the lintel in the western wall written in Odia script. The inscription has seven lines paleographically. It can be ascribed to the 18th century.

=== Physical description ===
Surrounding

The temple is surrounded by gateway of Rosasala in the west at a distance of 12.80 metres (42.0 ft), Kapilesvara–I in south at distance of 7.20 metres (23.6 ft), north eastern gateway at a distance of 4.60 metres (15.1 ft) and compound wall in the east.

Architectural features (Plan and Elevation)

On plan the temple measures 2.10 square metres (22.6 sq ft). On elevation the vimana is of pidha order that measures 3.53 metres (11.6 ft) in height, bada measures 1.23 metres (4 ft 0 in) (pabhaga 0.25 metres (9.8 in), tala jangha 0.32 metres (1 ft 1 in), bandhana 0.123 metres (4.8 in), upara jangha 0.31 metres (1 ft 0 in) and baranda 0.23 metres (9.1 in)). The gandi of the temple measures 1.30 metres (4 ft 3 in) and mastaka 1.003 metres (3 ft 3.5 in). The temple has four gateways, one on each side.

Mallia are priests of the Temple.

Classification	Grade
Architecture	C
Historic	C
Associational	B
Social/Cultural	B

== Beharana Mandapa / Baa-khia Mandapa ==
Beharana Mandapa or Baa khia Mandapa is located inside the Kapilesvara temple precinct. The Mandapa (hall) is provided with steps in the east and was built around 18th century. The ceiling that is made of wood is carved with various decorations like elephant, makara, and a series of lotus scroll work.

== Bhandara Ghara Shrine ==
Bhandara Ghara Shrine is located in the Kapilesvara temple precinct and it is a living temple built during the 16th century. It enshrines the chalanti pratima (movable deities) of Vishnu and Shiva. These deities are taken on procession on various festive occasions for public viewing.

== Ghanteswara Siva Temple ==
This temple is located in the Kapileswara precinct and the enshrined deity is a Siva lingam over a square yonipitha (basement) made of laterite. The temple has a vimana in pidha order with a triratha (three chariots) on plan. The gandi has three tiers.

== Guptesvara Siva temple ==
Guptesvara Siva temple is located within the Kapilesvara temple precinct and the enshrined deity is a Shiva lingam within a circular yoni pitha (basement) at the center of the sanctum. The temple was built during 14th–15th centuries.

=== Physical Description ===
The temple has a square sanctum measuring 1.70 metres (5 ft 7 in), with a frontal porch of 0.953 metres (3 ft 1.5 in). It is pancharatha as distinguished by a pair of anuratha and kanika pagas on either side of the raha. On elevation, the vimana is of pidha deul with usual bada, gandi and mastaka that measures 3.40 metres (11.2 ft) in height. With threefold division of bada, the temple has a trianga bada measuring 1.20 metres (3 ft 11 in) in height (Pabhaga 0.16 metres (6.3 in), jangha 0.86 metres (2 ft 10 in), baranda 0.18 metres (7.1 in)). The gandi and mastaka of the temple 192 measures 1.40 metres (4 ft 7 in) and 0.80 metres (2 ft 7 in) in height respectively. The walls are plain. The doorjambs are plain and measure 1.17 metres (3 ft 10 in) in height x 0.51 metres (1 ft 8 in) in width. The building material used here is Light grey sandstone. It was built with dry masonry construction techniques in Kalingan style. Over time, rain water seeped into the sanctum from all sides through cracks in the roof and walls. It was repaired by Orissa State Archaeology during X and XI Finance Commission Award and is now maintained by the Kapilesvara Trust Board.

== Hazara Mandapa ==
Hazara Mandap
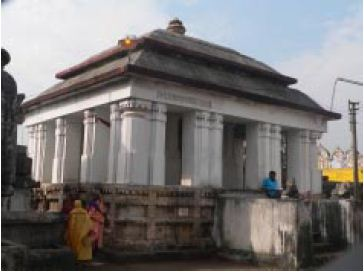

Religion
- Affiliation: Hinduism
- Deity: lord Shiva

Location
- Location: Bhubaneswar
- Interactive map of Hazara Mandap
- Coordinates: 20°14′14″N 85°50′5″E

Architecture
- Type: Kalingan Style (Kalinga Architecture)
- Completed: 13th century CE
- Elevation: 13 m (43 ft)

Hazara Mandapa is located within the Kapilesvara temple precinct, Kapilesvara village, Old Town, Bhubaneswar (Lat. 20°13’74"N., Long.85°49’65" E., Elev.45 ft (14 m)). It is a lofty Mandapa provided with a flight of steps. There are sixteen pillars that support the superstructure of flat roof. It was built in the 13th century and it is now under the guidance of Kapilesvara Temple Trust Board.In the first Saturday of every Sivaratri Lord Lingaraja comes to visit Lord Sanisvara sitting over this Mandapa. Then the lord marches towards the Kapilesvara Temple to meet God Kapila which is famously known as "Hari-Hara" Veta.

=== Tradition & legends ===
On the first Saturday after the Sivaratri lord Lingaraja visits lord Sanisvara, whose temple is beside the Mandapa. After paying homage to lord Sanisvara, Lord Lingarajaa sits for a while in the Hazara Mandap. There he proceeds to meet lord Kapila, which is popularly known as Kasia-Kapila Bheta.

=== Physical description ===
==== Surrounding ====
The Mandapa is surrounded by Sanisvara Temple in east at a distance of 1.003 metres (3 ft 3.5 in), temple compound wall in west and south and Dvitiya Kapilesvara in north at a distance of 11.20 metres (36.7 ft). The Mandapa is provided with a flight of steps in the northern side. The Mandapa has a lofty platform measuring 7.80 square metres (84.0 sq ft). On elevation the Mandapa measures 5.52 metres (18.1 ft) in height from pabhaga to kalasa. Like a temple its pista has Panchanga bada measuring 1.57 metres (5 ft 2 in) in height (pabhaga 0.32 metres (1 ft 1 in), tala jangha 0.31 metres (1 ft 0 in), bandhana 0.21 metres (8.3 in), upara jangha 0.28 metres (11 in), baranda 0.45 metres (1 ft 6 in)). There are 16 pillars that support the roof of the Mandapa. The pillars are arranged in four rows, each row with four pillars. The roof is made of two tiers of flat ceiling with a clerestorey in between that measures 1.50 metres (4 ft 11 in) in height. The mastaka which has a kalasa measures 0.80 metres (2 ft 7 in). The pillars measure 2.45 metres (8 ft 0 in) in height while the corner pillars are octagonal other pillars are square.

== Bakresvara / Kalika Siva Temple / Tirthesvara Temple ==
The Kalika Siva Temple is located beyond the southern compound wall of Kapilesvara siva temple and close to the northern embankment of Manikarnika tank. The temple faces west and the presiding deity of the temple is Siva lingam within a circular yonipitha (basement). The temple is made of sandstone and was built around 10th or 11th century.

== Laxmi Narayan Temple ==
The enshrined deity is Laxmi- Narayana seated in padmasana (lotus seat) over a lotus pedestal. The deity, Narayana has four arms holding conch in his upper right hand, a lotus in upper left hand and lower left hand is holding a mace. Laxmi is seated on his left lap. Both the images are crowned with Kirita mukuta. The temple has a vimana (shrine) in pidha order.

== Siddhesvara Siva temple ==
It is located inside the Kapilesvara temple precinct and was built in the 15th century. The temple faces east and the presiding deity of the temple is Siva lingam within a circular yonipitha (basement), which is made of laterite. The cella of vimana is made of sandstone and totally renovated one.

== Sombara Mandapa ==
The Vishnu Temple is located within the Kapilesvara temple precinct built in the 15th century. The temple faces east and the presiding deities of this temple are two Vishnu images, and the image of Jagannatha, Balabhadra, Subhadra and Buddha.

== Somabaresvara Siva Temple ==
The temple is located in the Kapilesvara temple precinct and the enshrined deity is a Sivalingam over a square yonipitha (basement) made of sandstone. The temple has a vimana in pidha order and it's triratha on plan is buried up to the baranda.

== See also ==
- Hazara Mandapa
- List of temples in Bhubaneswar

== Bibliography ==
- Lesser Known Monuments of Bhubaneswar by Dr. Sadasiba Pradhan (ISBN 81-7375-164-1)
