= Sanisvara Siva Temple =

- Location in Orissa

Religion
- Affiliation: Hinduism
- Deity: lord Shiva

Location
- Location: Bhubaneswar
- State: Orissa
- Country: India
- Interactive map of Sanisvara Siva Temple
- Coordinates: 20°15′11″N 85°50′36″E

Architecture
- Type: Kalingan Style (Kalinga Architecture)
- Completed: 14-15th century CE

Sanisvara Siva Temple is a Mandir situated at Gosagaresvara Precinct southern of Paradaresvara Siva Temple, Orissa, India. The temple is facing towards the east, the enshrined deity is a circular Yoni Pitha at the center of a 1.00 square meter sanctum.

== History ==
According to the local legend, during Ganga's rule around the 14th-15th Century CE, Lord Siva once killed a calf inadvertently. In order to cleanse the sin of killing the calf, he had to take a bath in the Gosagaresvara pond and worship the lord Gosagaresvara. Thus, the tradition began up to the present. People keep the practice of taking ritual baths in the temple tank and worshiping Gosagaresvara to cleanse the sin of killing a cow.

This temple is once used as a worshiping shrine. But at present, people consider it as a public living temple and classified as Pidha Deul typology.

== Significance ==
Its significance among Hindu devotees is cultural: the Shivaratri festival. One of the most important events is the visit of Lord Lingaraj during the Durga Puja festival. Social: this temple is not only a popular site among soon to be a couple for their marriage ceremony but also for thread ceremony, etc. It is also significant among group of people such as association as public meetings are being held.

== Location ==
The temple is located in Kapilaprasad, Khordha district, Bhubaneswar City, the capital of the Indian state of Orissa. It is surrounded by Paradaresvara Siva Temple in the north, Gosagaresvara tank in west, Minor Temple V in east and entrance gate is in the south.

== Sources ==
- Lesser Known Monuments of Bhubaneswar by Dr. Sadasiba Pradhan (ISBN 81-7375-164-1)
- Sanisvara Siva Temple, Kapilaprasad, Bhubaneswar, Dist.-Khurda
