= Paradaresvara Siva Temple =

Narasimha Temple
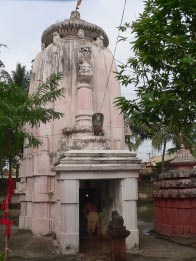

- Location in Orissa

Religion
- Affiliation: Hinduism
- Deity: lord Siva

Location
- Location: Bhubaneswar
- State: Orissa
- Country: India
- Interactive map of Narasimha Temple
- Coordinates: 20°15′11″N 85°50′36″E

Architecture
- Type: Kalingan Style (Kalinga Architecture)
- Completed: 13th century A.D.
- Elevation: 20 m (66 ft)

Paradaresvara Siva Temple is a 13th-century AD temple in Bhubaneswar, Odisha. The time period of its construction is estimated from its architectural features and it suggests that the temple must belong to the ganga period. Paradaresvra Siva temple is situated in the Gosagaresvar temple precinct. It is located on the left side of Ratha road (leading from Mausima chowk to Badheibanka Chowk) old town, Bhubaneswar. It is located at a distance of 1 km west of Lingaraja Temple and 1 km south of Ananta Vasudev, 300 metres southwest of Ramesvara Temple and 200 metres northwest of Vaital Temple. The temple is facing towards east. The presiding deity is only a circular yonipitha in the cella that measures 3 square metres. The lingam is missing.

The temple is used for worship in this temple.

== Physical description ==
=== Surrounding ===
The temple is surrounded by Isanesvara Temple in the east, Gosagaresvara tank in the western, Gosagaresvara Temple in north and Sanisvara Temple in the southern side.

=== Orientation ===
The temple is facing towards east.

=== Architectural features (plan and elevation) ===
On plan, temple is pancharatha with square vimana and a frontal porch. In addition to these there is a modern hall in front of the porch. The total plan measures 6.35 metres in length and 4.55 metres in width. On elevation, the vimana is in rekha order with usual bada, gandi and mastaka that measures 9.00 metres in height from khura to kalasa. The bada of the vimana has five vertical divisions measuring 3.00 metres in height pabhaga (0.74 metres), talajangha (0.58 metres), bandhana (0.31 metres), upara jangha (0.57 metres) and the baranda (0.80 metres) in height. The gandi of the vimana above the baranda measures 4.00 metres in height which is distinguished by a central raha and pair of anuratha and kanika pagas on either sides of raha is a curvilinear spire. The mastaka of the vimana as usual in Orissan temples has components like beki, amlaka. khapuri and kalasa that meausers 2.00 metres in height.

=== Raha niche & Parsvadevatas ===
The parsvadevata niches on three sides uniformly measures 0.60 metres in height, x 0.30 metres in width and 0.15 metres in depth are all empty. Beneath the niches is the plain tala garvika while above the niches is the urdhvagarvika as usual in the 13th Century temples of Orissa.

=== Decorative features ===
The base of the gandi above the baranda is decorated with a series of miniature rekha deuls surmounted by an udyota simha in each paga. The gandi is plain due to the reconstruction work and cement plaster and lime wash.

Doorjamb : The doorjambs measuring 1.88 metres in height and 1.20 metres in width is carved with three plain vertical bands of later addition. At the lalatabimba there is Gajalaxmi sitting in lalitasana over a lotus pedestal flanked by full-blown lotus and elephants on either side of the deity.

Lintel: The graha architrave is plain due to the renovation work.

=== Property type ===
The temple has the Rekha deul typology and it is a temple precinct.

Building material: Laterite

Construction techniques: Dry masonry.

Style: Kalingan

== Grade (A/B/C) ==
i) Architecture: B

ii) Historic: C

iii) Associational: B

iv) Social/Cultural: B

== Significance ==
i) Historic significance: The local people are indifferent about the historical significance of the temple.

ii)Cultural significance: Lord Lingaraja visits once a year.

iii) Social significance: Marriage ceremony, thread ceremony.

iv) Associational significance: Public meetings.

== Condition ==
At the moment, it is showing signs of deterioration. Rain water percolates into the sanctum through the cracks in the roof and gandi junctions. In a slow a process because of water logging in the sanctum on account of its low elevation and close proximity to the tank, it is getting slowly decayed.

Due to the renovation work done to the temple, there are no distress signs. It was repaired by the Orissa State Archaeology under X & XI Financial Commission Award and now any repairs and maintenance works are done by the local people of Ratha road.
