= Rai Bagan =

17th century female Mughal general

Savitribai of Mahur (died c. 1660s), better known by her title Rai Bagan or Raibagan ( Sanskrit - राजव्याघ्रि Marathi: रायबागन, lit. "Royal Tigress"), was a queen regent of Mahur. She was the widow of the Mughal sardar Raje Uddhavji ramji alias Udajiram alias Raje Udaram of Mahur in Deccan. After her son's death in Battle of Samugarh, she took control of her husband's territory. She defeated and killed Harchand Rai when he attacked her son's territory. For her courage and valour, the emperor conferred upon her the royal title of Rai Bagan. She was involved in Shaista Khan's campaign against the Maratha empire's founder Chhatrapati Shivaji.

== Family of Raje Udaram ==
Raje Uddhavji Ramji alias Raje Udaram alias Raje Udaji Ram, a close aid of Chhatrapati Shivaji's maternal grandfather Raje Lakhuji Jadhavrao, belonged to the first line of Maratha warriors, trained in Guerrilla Warfare. Initially, he worked with Malik Ambar. Later, due to differences with Malik Ambar, he joined Mughal forces after Ambar made an unsuccessful attack on his life. He was a part of Mughal forces in the Battle of Bhatvadi, fought between Mughal and Nizamshahi forces. In a letter dated 7 November 1624, addressed to the clerk of Adilabad, which formed a part of territory under his control, he is titled as "Maharaja Udaji Ram". The same title can be seen in a Mahjarnama dated 14 December 1631. These proceedings were presided over by Shahajahan. Maasir ul Umar states, "Though Udaji Ram was notorious for trickery and plotting, he also was famous for his ability and liberality. He never failed in charity to mankind, and in this respect was at the head of the Deccan officers." He died somewhere between 28 March 1633 and 6 April 1633 at the foothills of Daulatabad fort during a besiege to the fort. After his death, his tender aged son Jagjivanrao was immediately conferred with his father's Mansab and title "Udaji Ram".

Udajiram lived on a fortress of Mahur. The Jagir (land grant) of Udajiram was settled with Jagjivanrao only when he came to the age in 1937. Till then, Rai Bagan managed the affairs of the family Jagir. Maasir ul Umar states, "Rai Bhagini, who after his [Udaji Ram's] death skilfully managed the Zamindari affairs. As she had skilled servants in her employment, the Commander in Chief, after the death of Udaji Ram, in accordance with the necessity of the time and to prevent her men from deserting, proposed for her son Jagjivan, in spite of his tender age, the rank of 3,000 foot with 2,000 horse, and got for him the title of Udaji Ram." Jag Jivan was married to a woman named Laxmibai, who was conferred with a Jagir in pargana Daulatabad. This title remained with the all the descendants of Udaji Ram till the abolition of titles by the Constitution of India in 1950.

== Battle of Samugarh ==
Maasir ul Umar states, "When he [Jag Jivan] came to the years of discretion, he acquired a full acquaintance with Persian prose and poetry, and calligraphy. He also abandoned the ways of the Deccanis, and led a life like that of the officers of Upper (North) India. He conducted himself with honour and dignity, and held Mahor in fief." In 1658, prince Aurangzeb rebelled against his father Shah Jahan, when he heard about his illness. It was a war of accession in which Aurangzeb fought with his brother Dara Shikoh. The Mughal Empire split into two factions, led by Aurangzeb on one side and Dara on the other. Since Aurangzeb was Subedar of Deccan, Mansabdars from Deccan sided with him. They fought the decisive Battle of Samugarh at Samugarh near Agra. On 28 May 1658, Jag Jivan Rao, son of Maharaja Udaji Ram, died while fighting alongside Aurangzeb. In the family records of Raje Udarams, a letter was found by Shahajahan addressed to Jag Jivan Rao which shows that the family was personally under a threat of destruction by Harchand Rai. Shahajahan asked Jag Jivan Rao to be present before him. After the battle started, Jag Jivan Rao took the side of Aurangzeb. Probably when the news of his death reached, Harchand Rai attacked Mahur. Savitribai then retaliated and destroyed the forces of Harchand Rai. The courage and valour was recognised by Emperor Aurangzeb. He conferred title "Rai Bagan" to the only female warrior of the Mughal Army in those times.

== Confrontation with Chatrapati Shivaji Maharaj ==
In 1661, when Shaista Khan was appointed governor of Deccan by Aurangzeb, he captured Pune and nearby important stations while Shivaji Maharaj was stuck in the siege of Panhala Fort by the Bijapur sultanate. When Shivaji Maharaj escaped the siege and finally managed to reach his base Rajgad Fort, he turned his focus on Shahista Khan. Shivaji Maharaj made truces with Shahista Khan and also with Ali Adil Shah II of Bijapur. Rai Bagan was told to assist Shahista Khan. Meanwhile, Shahista Khan appointed Kartalab Khan and Rai Bagan to attack Konkan, which was under Shivaji Maharaja's control. They chose the path of Kurvanda Ghat. Shivaji Maharaja and his army were waiting for them in the forest near Umberkhind (Umber Gorge). In the Battle of Umberkhind, around 300-400 Maratha archers and swordsmen led by Shivaji Maharaj defeated the Mughals. Raibagan, after seeing his bravery and fighting skills, started praising Shivaji Maharaj. It seems that she was warning the Mughals since the beginning not to take Marathas lightly. When defeat was sure, she advised Kartalab Khan to surrender and seek truce with Shivaji Maharaj. Kartalab listened to her advice. Kavindra Parmananda has described this incidence in his poetry 'Shri Shiv Bharat'. He described her as "जायामुदयरामस्य जगज्जीवनमातरम् । राजव्याघ्रीति यां प्राहुर्युधि व्याघ्रीमिवोध्दुराम् ll सा प्रतापेन महता बताप्रतिहतायुधा ll" (Meaning: A woman who is fearless in battles like a Tigress, who is unstoppable, a wife of Udaji Ram and mother of Jag Jivan, who is well known as 'Raj Vyaghri')."

Rai Bagan said, "You have done a great mistake by entering into a forest which dwells under the patronage of a Lion named Shivaji. It is miserable to see that you have brought this army of Ruler of Delhi (Aurangzeb) into the jaw of a Lion only because of your ego... It is also miserable to see that Shahista Khan, a foolish general of army of Aurangzeb, has brought you along with your forces into enemy's heat of valour."

It can be seen from the records that Rai Bagan was not a full time warrior into a Mughal Army. She was only filling the void created by the absence of male heir with discretion into the family. She played a role of administrator after the death of her husband Maharaja Udaji Ram. After the death of her son Jag Jivan Rao, she took control of her army until Jag Jivan's son Babu Rao came of age.

In April 1663, Shivaji Maharaja made a surgical strike on Lal Mahal where Shahista Khan was camping in Pune. Khan escaped with heavy losses. Later, he was sent to Bengal on the orders of Aurangzeb. Rai Bagan was patrolling nearby Pune, even after that. Even though there is a mention of Udaji Ram's troops during the Battle of Purandar, she is nowhere mentioned.
