= Beharana Mandapa =

Pavilion in Bhubaneswar, Odisha, India

Coordinates: 20.229097°N 85.827457°E

Beharana Mandapa / Baa-khia Mandapa Beharana Mandapa (Lat- 20° 13’ 74" N., Long- 85° 49’ 65" E., Elev- 45 ft.) or Baa khia Mandapa is located inside the Kapilesvara temple precinct in Kapilesvara village, Old Town, Bhubaneswar. The Mandapa is provided with steps in the east. It was built around 18th Century A.D.

== Physical description ==
=== Surrounding ===
The Mandapa is surrounded by Dakhsina Kali temple on its south at a distance of 1.35 m, Kapilesvara temple on its northern side at a distance of 2.82 m, Store house on its western side at 3.60 m, Kapila Kunda on its eastern side 9.37 m.

=== Orientation ===
Mandapa is facing towards east as evident from a ritual Mandapa that faces towards east.

=== Architectural features (Plan and Elevation) ===
On plan, the Mandapa measures 3.20 m^{2}. with a height of 3.50 m. The Mandapa has four pillars on four corners that support a roof of G.I. Sheets. The ceiling that is made of wood is carved with various decorations like elephant, makara, a series of lotus scroll work etc.

Classification	Grade
Architecture	A
Historic	C
Associational	C
Social/Cultural	B
