= List of Bahmani Sultans =

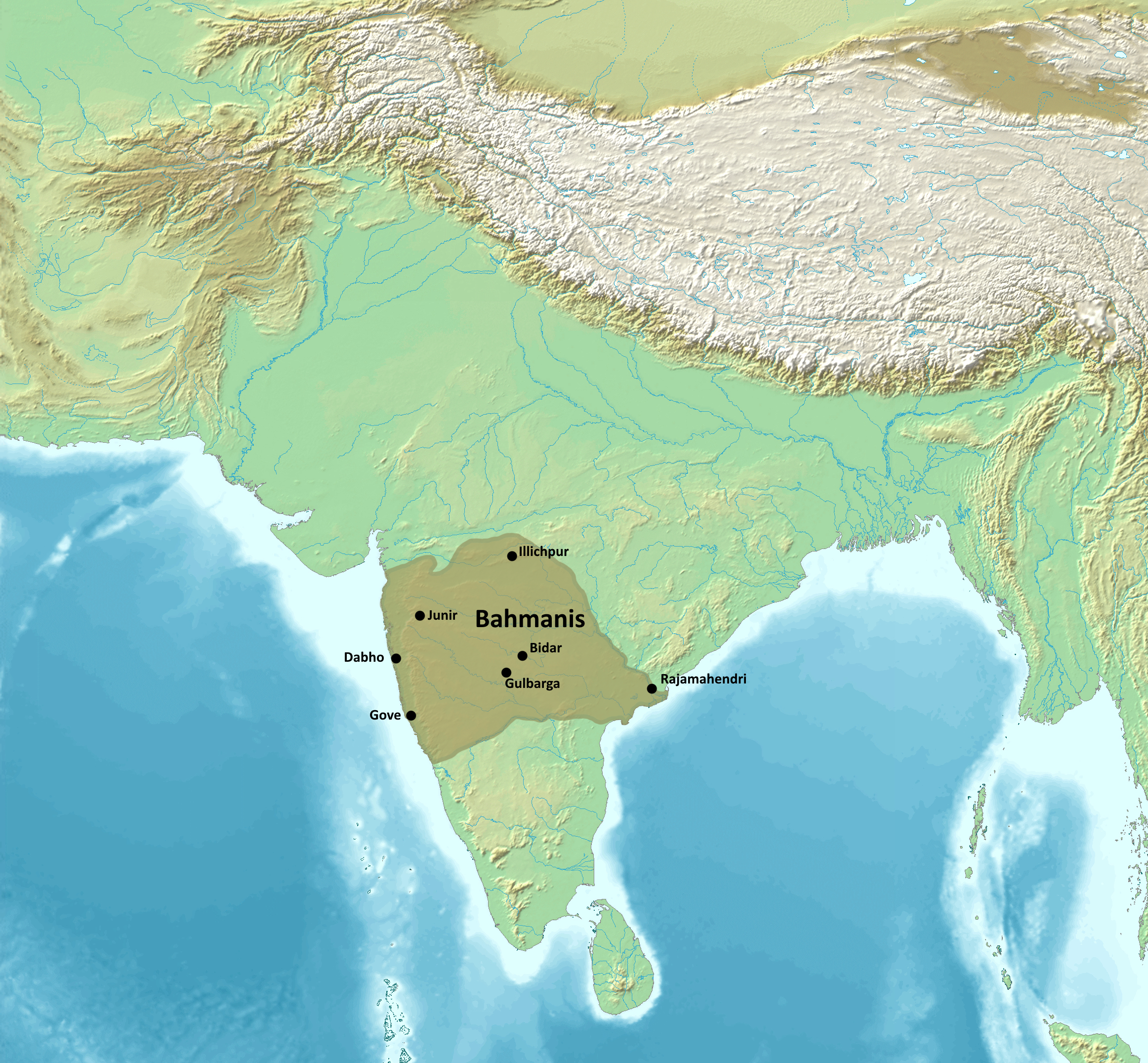
Maximum expansion of Bahmani Sultanate

The Bahmani Sultanate (c. 1347–1527) was a Muslim empire that ruled the Deccan Plateau in Southern India.

The kingdom came to power in 1347, when it was established by Zafar Khan. The Bahmani Sultanate shared border with neighboring rival Vijayanagara Empire. The Sultanate would begin its decline under the reign of Mahmood Shah. In 1518, the Bahmani Sultanate split up into the Deccan sultanates, ending its 180-year rule over the Deccan.

== Family tree ==
Bahmani dynasty

Ala ud-Din; Bahman; Shah I^{(1)} r. 1347-1358
Muhammad; Shah I^{(2)} r. 1358-1375	Mahmud	Dawud
Mujahid; Shah^{(3)} r. 1375-1378	Dawud Shah^{(4)} r. 1378	Muhammad; Shah II^{(5)} r. 1378-1397	Taj ud-Din; Firuz Shah^{(8)} r. 1397-1422	Ahmad; Shah I Wali^{(9)} r. 1422-1436
Ghiyath ud-Din; Shah^{(6)} r. 1397	Shams ud-Din; Shah^{(7)} r. 1397	Mubarak	Ala ud-Din; Ahmad; Shah II^{(10)} r. 1436-1458
Nargis; Begum	Humayun; Shah Zalim^{(11)} r. 1458-1461
Nizam ud-Din; Ahmad; Shah III^{(12)} r. 1461-1463	Muhammad; Shah III; Lashkari^{(13)} r. 1463-1482
Mahmud Shah^{(14)} r. 1482-1518
Ahmed; Shah IV^{(15)} r. 1518-1520	Waliullah; Shah^{(17)} r. 1523-1526	Kalimullah; Shah^{(18)} r. 1526-1527
Ala ud-Din; Shah II^{(16)} r. 1520-1523

== List of Bahmani Shahs ==
Titular Name	Personal Name	Reign
Independence from Sultan of Delhi, Muhammad bin Tughlaq.
Shah Ala-ud-Din Bahman Shah	Ala-ud-Din Bahman Shah I	3 August 1347 – 11 February 1358
Shah	Mohammad Shah I	11 February 1358 – 21 April 1375
Shah Ala-ud-Din Mujahid Shah	Mujahid Shah	21 April 1375 – 16 April 1378
Shah	Daud Shah Bahmani	16 April 1378 – 21 May 1378
Shah	Mohammad Shah II	21 May 1378 – 20 April 1397
Shah	Ghiyath-ad-din Shah	20 April 1397 – 14 June 1397
Shah	Shams-ud-Din Shah; Puppet King Under Lachin Khan Turk	14 June 1397 – 15 November 1397
Shah Taj-ud-Din Feroze Shah	Feroze Shah	24 November 1397 – 1 October 1422
Shah	Ahmed Shah Wali Bahmani	1 October 1422 – 17 April 1436
Shah Ala-ud-Din Ahmed Shah	Ala-ud-Din II Ahmed Shah Bahmani	17 April 1436 – 6 May 1458
Shah Ala-ud-Din Humayun Shah	Humayun Shah Zalim Bahmani	7 May 1458 – 4 September 1461
Shah	Nizam Shah Bahmani	4 September 1461 – 30 July 1463
Shah Muhammad Shah Lashkari	Muhammad Shah Bahmani III	30 July 1463 – 26 March 1482
Vira Shah	Mahmood Shah Bahmani II; Puppet King Under Nizam-ul-Mulk Bahri	26 March 1482 – 27 December 1518
Shah	Ahmed Shah Bahmani II; Puppet King Under Amir Barid I	27 December 1518 – 15 December 1520
Shah	Ala-ud-Din Shah Bahmani II; Puppet King Under Amir Barid I	28 December 1520 – 5 March 1522
Shah	Waliullah Shah Bahmani; Puppet King Under Amir Barid I	5 March 1522 – 1526
Shah	Kaleemullah Shah Bahmani; Puppet King Under Amir Barid I	1525–1527
Dissolution of the Sultanate into five Kingdoms namely; Bidar Sultanate; Ahmednagar Sultanate; Bijapur Sultanate; Golconda Sultanate and Berar Sultanate.

== See also ==
- Vijayanagara Empire
- Bahmani Sultanate
- Deccan Sultanates
- List of Vijayanagara emperors
- List of Indian monarchs
- History of Karnataka
