= Gajapati invasion of Bidar =

15th century military conflict in India

- Part of Bahmani-Gajapati conflicts
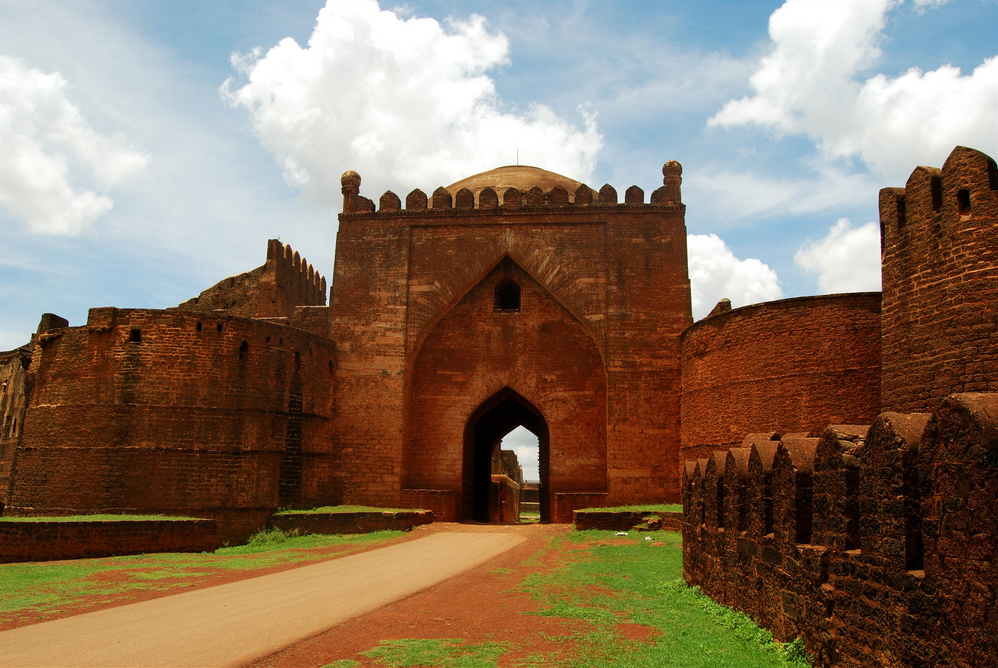
- The Bidar Fort
Date	September 1461
Location	Bidar, Karnataka 17.912°N 77.520°E
Result	Bahmani victory
Territorial changes	Status quo ante bellum

Belligerents
Bahmani Sultanate	Gajapati Empire; Kakatiya chiefs

Commanders and leaders
Mahmud Gawan; Muhibullah	Kapilendra Deva

Strength
160 horsemen Unengaged: 40,000 cavalry	10,000 footmen 400 horsemen

Casualties and losses
Unknown	2,000–3,000 soldiers killed
- Location within Karnataka Gajapati invasion of Bidar (India)

The Gajapati invasion of Bidar in 1461 was a significant military expedition by Kapilendra Deva of the Gajapati Empire against the Bahmani Sultanate. This event unfolded in the aftermath of Humayun Shah Bahmani's demise and the subsequent ascent of Nizam Shah Bahmani to the throne. The primary objective of the campaign was to seize Bidar, the present-day region of Karnataka. Backed by Kakatiya chiefs, the Gajapati forces engaged in a decisive conflict with the Bahmani forces led by Muhibullah. The outcome saw the defeat of the Gajapatis, compelling the submission of Kapilendra.

== Background ==
Kapilendra Deva established the Gajapati Empire in Odisha in the year 1434. He waged wars against the neighboring Bahmani and Vijayanagar Kingdoms. Kapilendra invaded the territories of the Bahmani Dynasty during the reign of Sultan Humayun Shah, who died in 1461. Nizam Shah Bahmani, the eight-year-old son of Humayun Shah, succeeded him to the throne.

Kapilendra perceived this as an opportunity to invade the Bahmani Dynasty, thinking it would be easier to capture its capital due to their minor ruler. Khwaja-i-Jahan, was the regent ruler and Mahmud Gawan was the Vizier of the Bahmanis at the time.

== The campaign ==
In 1461, Kapilendra led a march towards Bidar with the backing of Kakatiya chiefs and the Zamindars of Telangana to invade the Bahmani Dynasty. He pillaged the regions and progressed toward the Bahmani capital. The Gajapati forces, comprising 10,000 men and 400 horses, faced opposition from the Bahmani chiefs who sent a contingent of 160 horsemen led by Mahmud and Muhibullah, the son of Khalilullah, a recognized Ghazi. Mahmud and Muhibullah marched against the Gajapatis, leading to a military conflict. The Bahmanis charged their force against the Gajapati vanguard, and the outcome favored them, as the Gajapati forces under Kapilendra retreated from the battlefield. Believing that the entire Bahmani army was mobilizing, the Gajapatis left their heavy baggage on the field and sought refuge in a fort.
Firishta documents the message from the Bahmani chief to Kapilendra as follows:

"This king of ours, with his youthful good fortune, has been wishing to march with an army to the lands of Odissa, Oriya and Jajnagar in order to conquer them. It is good that you have simplified our work by coming here yourself. Now understand definitely that unless you promise to pay a tribute and unless you return all the money you have seized from the land of the Musalmans, not one of your men will be able to go back alive."

— Firishta

The Gajapatis lost two to three thousand men. Kapilendra, in a gesture of submission, paid tribute to the Bahmanis by surrendering twenty-five elephants and a substantial amount of gold and silver to secure his life.

Kapilendra's sudden withdrawal stemmed from Jaunpur Sultan Hussain Sharqi's invasion of Orissa. After capturing Tirhut, he sent detachments to conquer Orissa. This compelled Kapilendra to retract from Bahmani territories, compelling him to seek peace. Despite facing Hussain Sharqi, Kapilendra surrendered once more, presenting 30 elephants and 100 horses.

== See also ==
- Bahmani invasion of Orissa
- Battle of Katasin
