= Malik Hasan Bahri =

Peshwa of the Bahmani Sultanate from 1481 to 1486

- Malik Naib; Wakil; Peshwa; Sarang Khan; Mir-i-Shikar; Mansabdar; Tarafdar; Qush Begi; Sar-i-Lashkar; Ashraf-i-Humayun; Nizam-ul-Mulk; Masnad-i-Ali; Ulugh-i-Azam

Peshwa and Regent of the Bahmani Sultanate
- Reign: 1481–1486
- Predecessor: Mahmud Gawan
- Successor: Qasim Barid I
- Died: 1486
- Issue: Malik Ahmad Nizam Shah I Bibi Zinat (Zaynab) Begum
- Father: Bhairon (Bhairav Bhat Kulkarni)
- Religion: Hinduism (till 1423); Hanafi Sunni Islam (after 1423)

Nizam-ul-Mulk Malik Hasan Bahri (died 1486) or Tima Bhat Kulkarni was a noble of the Bahmani Sultanate in India who served as the prime minister from 1481 until his murder in 1486. He was the father of Malik Ahmad Nizam Shah I, founder of the Ahmadnagar Sultanate, one of the secessionist kingdoms from the Bahmani Sultanate, and its ruling dynasty's primogenitor.

Originally a Hindu Kulkarni Brahmin from Pathri, he was taken captive by Bahmani forces in the 1420s and converted to Islam. He entered the service of the sultanate as a military slave and was given further education. In 1471, he led the conquest of forts of the Gajapati Empire after he had been sent to influence a succession conflict in the state, and was given governorship over the Bahmani province of Telangana. As the leader of the Deccani faction in the conflict between them and those not native to South Asia, he helped plot the execution of Mahmud Gawan in 1481, the foreign prime minister at the time and Malik Hasan's predecessor. He then adopted the role, and in 1482 became the sole regent of Mahmood Shah, where throughout his ministership he had effective control of the state. In 1486, he was killed amidst continual internal strife.

== Biography ==
=== Rise to power and reign ===
According to the court historian Ferishta, Malik Hasan was originally a Brahmin from Pathri, a town in the Maharashtra. He initially bore the name of Tima Bhat, and his father was named Bhairo. However according to MG Ranade and Akola district gazetter his father was the kulkarni of pathri in marathwada. Varying accounts of his true origin explain why his family was in the region; one claims that they were escaping persecution perpetrated by Muslims, while another purports they were fleeing their native land from famine. In 1422–23, during one of Ahmad Shah I Wali of the Bahmani Sultanate's campaigns against Vijayanagara, he was taken captive by the sultan's forces and converted to Islam, being given his name Malik Hasan Bahri. Conscripted as a military slave of the sultanate, he was simultaneously given additional education to complement his prior schooling, where he was, at the behest of Sultan Alau'd-din Ahmad Shah, sent to an institution with then-prince Humayun Shah, and taught Persian. Humayun Shah's reported inability to properly pronounce Malik Hasan's surname led to his adoption of the surname "Bahri". During the reign of Muhammad Shah III starting in 1463, he was made a servant of the sultan and later an amir with a rank giving him charge of 2,000 horses.

In 1471, Malik Hasan led conquests in Orissa as a commander of the Bahmani army; he had been sent by the sultan to sway the succession conflict in the Gajapati Empire between Hamvira Deva and Purushottama Deva in the sultanate's favour, seeking to support the former. While in the country, he defeated Mangal Rai, an usurper, restored Hamvira Deva to the throne of Orissa and seized control of and annexed the key forts of Kondaveedu and Rajahmundry. Through the spoils of his conquests, he was made the tarafdar (provincial governor) of Telangana. His notoriety was greatly increased for his role in this and other campaigns, with him receiving the title of Nizam-ul-Mulk. In 1475, prime minister Mahmud Gawan, recognizing Malik Hasan's son (Note: An alternative, but generally considered false theory states that Ahmad was rather the son of the sultan and a Hindu woman of royal lineage, and that after an astrological map had predicted his future aptitude, he was given into the care of Malik Hasan, then residing far from the capital in Maharashtra. However, this theory is contradictory to the one presented by Ferishta, and is proved false by a contemporary letter which uses Ahmad's full name, Malik Ahmad Nizam-ul-Mulk b. Malik Naib.) Ahmad's future potential, was able to split the two by sending the younger to Malik Hasan's jagir, Mahur. Malik Hasan ruled as the provincial governor of Telangana until the taraf's division with the invasion of the Gajapatis in 1478, and was subsequently made governor of the eastern of the two new provinces, Rajahmundry. The lessened significance of his new position angered him, and was a source of his hatred for Mahmud Gawan, who was of the opposing Afaqi faction. In 1480, Ahmad returned to his father's company as his subordinate at Rajamundry. Malik Hasan, as the leader of the opposing Deccani faction, successfully plotted to have Mahmud Gawan murdered in 1481. Following Mahmud's execution, Malik Hasan adopted the role of prime minister, and the title of Peshwa was bestowed upon him.

Bahmani sultan Muhammad III died a year later in 1482, and Malik Hasan was made the sole regent and prime minister of the Deccani-favouring Mahmood Shah, then only twelve years old. Upon his acceptance of his new role, he became known as Malik Naib. Due to the absence of many prominent Bahmani nobles at Mahmood Shah's coronation, including Yusuf Adil Shah and Fathullah Imad-ul-Mulk, Malik Hasan asked for these gestures to be repeated with these nobles present at Bidar, the Bahmani capital. Upon his arrival, Yusuf proceeded to the sultan guarded with 200 soldiers, seen as improper but to him necessary for his protection. Malik Hasan likewise was accompanied by 500 armed men, and in the joint procession Yusuf controversially took priority over the prime minister, but no further conflict came of this. The next day Malik invited Yusuf to Bidar to assist in the administration of the sultanate. Soon after his arrival, however, he fled due to the ongoing massacre of Turks living in the city, where in this twenty-day period of strife he had been sought to be killed. Upon his departure a triumvirate regency council was installed, with Nizam-ul-Mulk ruling as prime minister. Malik Hasan's success in seizing this role led Yusuf to take control of the taraf of Bijapur, where he would later establish a sultanate on the province's territory.

Throughout his ministership, Malik Hasan exerted de facto control over the state and its affairs, with Mahmood Shah serving as a puppet under him. He ruled efficiently and without strife. During his reign, his jagir in Maharashtra was significantly expanded to encompass the territory that would become the Ahmadnagar Sultanate, by appending to his domains Beed and territories adjoining Junnar and Daulatabad. The administration of these estates was then handed over to Ahmad, who chose to relocate there.

=== Death and aftermath ===
Malik Hasan was intensely disliked by many nobles of the sultanate, both of his own faction for his role in Mahmud Gawan's death and the foreigners for his policy against them. In 1486, four years into his ministership, a conspiracy akin to the one he had sown against Mahmud was developed against him: following the death of the provincial governor of Warangal, a Bahmani noble temporarily seized control of both Bahmani provinces comprising Telangana; Malik Hasan successfully made the noble relinquish control of his captured territory, but while away from Bidar, a conspiracy against him was formed, upon which the sultan was convinced to issue a decree to have Malik Hasan put to death. Days later, he was murdered by one of his own nobles at Bidar.

Following his death, conflict among the nobles of the sultanate persisted. From his jagir of Junnar, Malik Hasan's son Ahmad Bahri took his father's title of Nizam-ul-Mulk in 1486 and forcibly increased his autonomy and territorial control by subduing nearby forts nominally under Bahmani control but held by Marathas. He subsequently repelled attempts by the central authority to thwart his increase in power, achieving de facto independence from the Bahmani Sultanate, marking him the first sultan to do so. By 1490, he had established the Ahmadnagar Sultanate. Developments in Bidar occurred as well after Malik Hasan's death, where he was succeeded by the foreigner Qasim Barid I as prime minister, who further estranged Ahmad and the Deccanis.
