= Battle of Maheskar =

1462 battle part of the Malwa–Bahmani Wars

- Part of Malwa–Bahmani Wars
Date	12 February 1462
Location	Maheskar, near Manjira River
Result	Malwa Sultanate victory

Belligerents
Malwa Sultanate	Bahmani Sultanate

Commanders and leaders
Mahmud Khalji; Ghiyath Shah (WIA); Sher Khan; Taj Khan; Khawas Khan; Yaqan Khan; Mubarak Khan; Qiwam Khan; Mukhtas Khan; Yusuf Khan; Malik Firuz; Nusrat Khan; Mahabat Khan †; Zahir-ul-Mulk †; Nizam-ul-Mulk Ghori	Nizam-Ud-Din Ahmad III; Mahmud Gawan; Nizam-ul-Mulk Turk; Khwaja-i Jahan Turk; Sikandar Khan (AWOL)

Strength
40,000 cavalry 60 elephants	31,000 cavalry 240 elephants

Casualties and losses
Unknown	107 elephants captured

The Battle of Maheskar, was a major military conflict between the Malwa Sultanate under Sultan Mahmud Khalji and the Bahmani Sultanate under the young Nizam-ud-Din Ahmad III. It was Mahmud Khalji's second major attempt to expand into the Deccan, following an unsuccessful invasion in 1453 during the reign of Alau'd-din Ahmad Shah. Mahmud Khalji fought a decisive battle at Maheskar on 12 February 1462 near the Manjira River through effective tactics against Bahmani war elephants. He proceeded to besiege the Bahmani capital of Bidar. Although the battle was a decivise victory for Malwa, the campaign ultimately ended in failure when the timely intervention of Gujarati forces under Mahmud Begada, combined with Bahmani resistance, forced Khalji into a difficult retreat through Berar, resulting in heavy losses.

== Background ==
The reign of Alau'd-din Ahmad Shah (r. 1436–1458), was marked by severe internal power struggles within the Bahmani kingdom. Mahmud Khalji of Malwa had been quietly watching the internal chaos in the Bahmani kingdom, waiting for the right moment to take advantage. His opportunity came when Sultan Ala-ud-din Ahmad Shah's brother-in-law Jalal Khan and his son Sikandar Khan rebelled in Nalgonda. While Jalal Khan stayed behind to defend the fort of Nalgonda, Sikandar Khan fled to Mahur and lied to Mahmud, claiming the Bahmani Sultan was dead, and the kingdom was falling apart. He begged Mahmud to invade quickly, promising that Berar and Telangana would be easy pickings. In January–February 1453, Mahmud set out from Hoshangabad with about 50,000 troops, joined forces with Mubarak Khan of Khandesh, and marched toward Mahur. But when the Bahmani Sultan heard about the invasion, he rushed north with a huge army of 180,000 troops. Faced with such overwhelming numbers and realising the Sultan was alive, Mahmud decided not to risk battle. He ordered a retreat. The campaign ended in vain.

== Battle ==
After the accession of Nizam-Ud-Din Ahmad III, Mahmud Khalji again sought to capture Elichpur. On 25 October 1461, he led his army against the Bahmani kingdom. Mahmud Khalji first marched towards Khandesh, crossing the Narmada River to Asir. Adil Khan (r. 1457–1501) of Khandesh quickly submitted through an envoy. Satisfied that his rear was secure, Mahmud then advanced towards the Deccan. After crossing Khandesh, Mahmud Khajli marched to Balapur where he received information of the Bahmani counter force. The Bahmani sultan Nizam-Ud-Din Ahmad mobilised his army. He marched at the head of the combined armies of Bijapur, Daulatabad, and Berar. He was accompanied by Mahmud Gawan, Khwaja-i Jahan Turk, Sikandar Khan Turk, and several other high-ranking officers. Mahmud Khalji divided his army into three contingents. He positioned himself at the centre (Qalb) with 60 elephants and 30,000 cavalry. The right wing (Maimana) was placed under Sher Khan, with 30 elephants and 10,000 cavalry, while the left wing (Maisara) was commanded by Khan-i-Azam Taj Khan. The advance guard was also divided into three parts: a centre (Qalb-i-A'la) and two wings. In the Qalb-i-A'la, he stationed 20 elephants and several thousand specially equipped soldiers. The right wing of the advance guard (Janah-i-Maimana-i-Khas) was led by officers including Khawas Khan, Yaqan Khan, Mubarak Khan, and Qiwam Khan. The left wing (Janah-i-Maisara-i-Khas) was commanded by officers such as Mukhtas Khan, Yusuf Khan, Malik Firuz, Nusrat Khan, and several others. Marching forward the Malwa army reached in Mauza of Maheskar (Note: Located approximately 8 kuroh or 25.76 km from Bidar) by the river Manjar on 12 February 1462. Mahmud planned to rest his army and start the battle the next day, as the troops were exhausted and disorganised after a long march. While taking preparations, he received news that the Bahmani army was already advancing to attack. With no time to reorganise, Mahmud ordered his forces to fight in the marching formation they were already in. The Bahmani battle formation was followed by the boy-king Nizam Shah positioned in the centre, accompanied by Khwaja-i Jahan Turk and Sikandar Khan, with 11,000 cavalry and 100 elephants. On his right stood Nizam-ul-Mulk Turk with 10,000 lancers and 100 elephants, while on his left was Mahmud Gawan with 10,000 cavalry and 40 elephants. Sultan Nizam-Ud-Din Ahmad was directly opposed by Sultan Mahmud Khalji. Khwaja-i Jahan faced Mahabat Khan of Chanderi and Zahir-ul-Mulk, while Nizam-ul-Mulk Turk confronted his namesake Nizam-ul-Mulk Ghori and Crown prince Ghiyath Shah. The two armies clashed soon. In the first charge led by Mahmud Gawan, both Mahabat Khan and Zahir-ul-Mulk were slain. Ghiyath Shah was wounded during a charge of Nizam-ul-Mulk Turk and withdrew from the battlefield. Mahmud Khalji, seeing that his forces were being pressed hard personally engaged in battle. In melee combat, a fierce charge was made on Sultan Mahmud, but he was saved by the timely intervention of Sikandar Khan though the elephant of Mahmud Khalji was wounded. The Bahmanis, noticing the Malwa army under heavy pressure, released about 50 war elephants to charge at them. However, a concentrated volley of arrows was launched from the Malwa forces. This turned the Sikandar Khan Deccani's elephants back, causing them to stampede into their own lines. This created widespread chaos in the Bahmani ranks. Sikandar Khan Deccani under whose was responsible for protecting the boy-king Nizam Shah became alarmed for the Sultan's safety. Thus, he carried him straight to Bidar. The confusion caused by the elephants' rampage and Sultan's absence disheartened the Bahmani troops. Taking this opportunity, Mahmud attacked with his personal force and completely routed the Bahmanis who fled towards Bidar. The Malwa forces captured 99 elephants in two groups along with 8 wounded elephants and a large quantity of booty. Mahmud Khalji assuming the retreat as trap stayed there for three days waiting the Bahmani army to fully retreat into Bidar.

== Aftermath ==
Next Mahmud Khalji advanced to the Bahmani capital, Bidar and besieged the citadel. The Malwa army captured the province of Berar, Bir and Daulatabad. The Dowagar Queen, along with Mahmud Gawan, sent the Nizam-Ud-Din Ahmad safety at Firozabad and strengthened Bidar's defence under Mallu Khan Deccani. She then sent message seeking help from Mahmud Begada of Gujarat. Mahmud Begada quickly marched with 80,000 cavalries to Sultanpur in Nandurbar district. The arrival of troops boosted the Bahmani morale. Mahmud Gawan was sent with 6,000 cavalries to advance from Bir. 20,000 Gujarati troops also joined him. In the meantime, he had mobilised more men and with an army 40,000 strong marched back to Bidar. Khwaja-i Jahan was also dispatched toward Bidar. Finding himself surrounded from three sides, Mahmud Khalji immediately withdrew. With main routes blocked, he retreated towards Kalyani but was intercepted by the scouting team. He had to cross through the difficult terrain of Berar. As many as 5,000-6,000 troops died in heat and dehydration while the rest were plundered by the Gonds. The timely Gujarati intervention saved Bahmani kingdom and prevented Mahmud from capturing any lasting advantage.

== See also ==
- Battle of Mandalgarh
- Battle of Kapadvanj
- Malwa–Bahmani Wars

== Bibliography ==
- Day, Upendra Nath (1965). Medieval Malwa: A Political and Cultural History, 1401-1562. Munshi Ram Manohar Lal. ISBN 978-81-215-0401-0.
- Sherwani, Haroon Khan (1946). The Bahmanis of The Deccan.
- Habib, Mohammad; Nizami, Khaliq Ahmad, eds. (1970). A Comprehensive History of India: The Delhi Sultanat (A.D. 1206-1526). Vol. V. People's Publishing House.
- Shrivastav, P. N. (1971). Gazetteer of India Madhya Pradesh: Betul. Bhopal, Madhya Pradesh: Government Central Press.
