= Mahmood Shah Bahmani II =

Sultan of the Bahmani Sultanate from 1482 to 1518

14th Bahmani Sultan
- Reign: 26 March 1482 – 27 December 1518
- Predecessor: Muhammad Shah Lashkari
- Successor: Ahmed Shah Bahmani II
- Born: 1470
- Died: 27 December 1518 (aged 47–48)
Names
- Shihab-Ud-Din Mahmud
- Father: Muhammad Shah Lashkari
- Religion: Islam

Mahmood Shah (1470 – 27 December 1518) or Shihab-Ud-Din Mahmud was the sultan of the Bahmani Sultanate from 1482 until his death in 1518. His long rule is noted for the disintegration of the sultanate and the creation of the independent Deccan sultanates.

== Reign ==
Mahmood was born about 1470 the son of Muhammad Shah Lashkari. He ascended the throne at age 12 on 26 March 1482 (Safar 5, 887 AH). The new Regency was formed with the Queen as president and Malik Na'ib, one of the conspirators behind the death of Mahmud Gawan, as regent.

His early reign was characterised by the conflict between the rising power of newcomers, epitomised by Yusuf Adil Shah, and the traditional Deccani nobles, led by Malik Na'ib. After a failed attempt to assassinate Yusuf Adil Shah, the sultan retired to Bijapur and left the running of the country in the hands of a viceroy or Malik Na'ib, Nizam-ul-Mulk Malik Hasan Bahri, and his fellow Deccani. The Malik Na'ib himself was assassinated in 1486. An attempt to assassinate the sultan by Deccani in 1487 led to the slaughter of many Deccani and the strengthening of the newcomers' position.

The Sultan's obviously weak position led to increasing unrest amongst the nobles, particularly the powerful regional governors, some of whom, like Fathullah Imad-ul-Mulk quietly assumed the titles of royalty. Others led in open rebellion. Qasim Barid I led one of the first revolt from Bidar and successfully defeated the army sent by the sultan to rein him in. Qasim Barid was raised to Barid-ul-mumalik and made prime minister and de facto ruler, while the sultan lived a life of indulgence. The King's expenditure was so high that he had jewels extracted from the Turquoise throne and used for payment.

On 28 May 1490, Malik Ahmad Nizam Shah I revolted and defeated the Bahmani army led by general Jahangir Khan. He built a palace, making it the center of the newly created Ahmednagar Sultanate. Yusuf Adil Shah followed suit creating the Adil Shahi dynasty centered at Bijapur, with Fathullah Imad-ul-Mulk creating the Berar Sultanate within the year. Qasim Barid founded the Bidar Sultanate centered at Bidar in 1492 while Golconda Sultanate became independent under Quli Qutb Shah in 1518 whose capital was at Golconda in modern Hyderabad.

Krishnadevaraya marched towards Bidar in pursuit of Barid. Upon engaging in battle, he emerged victorious and captured the fort. As a testament to his diplomatic and strategic acumen, Krishnadevaraya restored Sultan Mahmud Shah to power in Bidar, symbolizing his commitment to fostering discord among his Muslim neighbors. In recognition of this significant act, Krishnadevaraya adopted the title of 'Yavana-rajya-sthapana-charya.'

On Qasim Barid's death in 1504, the title of prime minister was passed to his son Amir Barid. The Sultan died on 27 December 1518 (Zil-hij 24, 924 AH) and was succeeded by his son Ahmed.

== Sources ==
- Ferishta, Mahomed Kasim (1829). History of the Rise of the Mahometan Power in India, till the year A.D. 1612. Translated by Briggs, John. London: Longman, Rees, Orme, Brown and Green.
- Allchin, Frank Raymond. "Bahmanī consolidation of the Deccan". Encyclopædia Britannica. Encyclopædia Britannica, Inc.
- Haig, Wolseley, ed. (1925). The Cambridge History of India Vol. II: Turks and Afghans. Cambridge University Press.
- Yazdani, Ghulam (1947). Bidar, Its History and Monuments. London: Oxford University Press.

Preceded by Muhammad Shah Lashkari	Bahmani Shah; 1482–1518	Succeeded by Ahmed Shah Bahmani II
