= Ahmad Nizam Shah =

Sultan of Ahmadnagar from 1490 to 1510

Ahmad Nizam Shah I
- Malik
- Portrait of Ahmad Nizam Shah, 18th century

1st Sultan of Ahmadnagar
- Reign: 28 May 1490 – 1510
- Predecessor: Position established
- Successor: Burhan Nizam Shah I
- Died: 1510
Names
- Malik Ahmad Nizam-ul-Mulk Bahri Shah
- Dynasty: Nizam Shahi dynasty (founder)
- Father: Nizam-ul-Mulk Malik Hasan Bahri
- Religion: Sunni Islam

Malik Ahmad Nizam Shah (Persian: ملک احمد نظام شاه) was the founder of the Nizam Shahi dynasty and the Ahmadnagar Sultanate.

Ahmad was the son of the Nizam ul-Mulk Malik Hasan Bahri, a Hindu Brahmin from Beejanuggar (or Bijanagar) originally named Timapa who converted to Islam. However According to Ranade and Akola district gazetteer his father was the Kulkarni of Pathri a town in marathwada. Ahmad's father was made Malik Na'ib on the death of Mahmud Gavan and was appointed prime minister by Mahmood Shah Bahmani II. Soon after, he appointed Ahmad governor of Beed and other districts in the vicinity of Dowlutabad. He chose to take up residence in Junnar. His initial attempts to take up this responsibility were rejected by the local officers, but, despite his youth and the weakness of the Sultanate, he captured the hillfort at Soonere and the city after a long siege. Using the resources from the city, he campaigned through 1485, capturing Chavand, Lohgad, Tung, Kooray, Tikona, Kondhana, Purandar, Bhorop, Jivdhan, Kuhrdroog, Murud-Janjira, Mahuli and Pali. He was fighting in the Konkan coastal regions when he heard of the death of his father. Withdrawing to Junnar in 1486, Ahmad assumed the titles of Nizam ul-Mulk Bahri from his father, the last signifying a falcon as Hasan had been falconer to the Sultan.

== Background ==
He defended his province against incursions from the Sultan, successfully defeating a much larger army led by Sheikh Mowullid Arab in a night attack and an army of 18,000 led by Azmut ul-Mulk. His success was such that the Sultan "complained of the disgrace to which his troops had been subjected, in allowing Ahmad, the son of Nizam ul-Mulk the falconer, to soar aloft like a falcon while they lay trembling in their nests."

The Sultan, Mahmood Shah Bahmani II, then called upon Jahangir Khan, a successful general and governor of Telangana with 3,000 horsemen to subdue Ahmad. Khan took Peitan and crossed the ghat at Teesgam to encamp at Bingar. Feeling he was safe for the season, Khan was caught unawares by an attack at daybreak by Ahmad on 28 May 1490. The Sultan's army was routed in what became known as the Victory of the Garden. Ahmad built a palace with an elegant garden on the site and donated the proprietary rights of the local village as a residence for holy men to celebrate the victory.

The governor of Daulatabad was an appointee of Ahmad father's, Mullik Wujee. Ahmad was on good terms with Wujee, and gave his sister to be his wife. When they had a son, Wujee's younger brother Mullik Ashruf, who had wished to be king, plotted against the child and killed both him and his father. He then sought alliances with Fathullah Imad-ul-Mulk, Mahmud Begada and Yusuf Adil Shah against Ahmad. In retribution, Ahmad marched on Ashruf in 1493 but despite two months siege, he failed to capture the city.

Returning to Junnar, he vowed to build a new capital, Ahmednagar, named after himself. The first foundations were laid in 1494 and the city was built in two years, serving as the capital for the new Ahmadnagar Sultanate for over a century.

In 1499, Mahmud Begada sided with Mullik Ashruf and attacked Khandesh. Miran Adil Khan Gujjar II sent to Fathullah Imad-ul-Mulk and Ahmad Nizam Shah requesting aid, and a combined force from the three sultanates was raised. On the night before the battle, Ahmad led 5000 infantry, armed with bows, rockets and matchlocks, to attack the camp. Simultaneously, an elephant was let loose in the camp and in the ensuing chaos, Mahmud Begada fled the scene, his army following in the early morning. Mullik Ashruf offered tribute to Mahmud Begada, which led to revolt in the city. When Ahmad surrounded Daulatabad with 5000 troops, Mullik Ashruf died after an illness of five days and the city became part of the Ahmadnagar Sultanate.

He was considered a just and wise ruler. In the words of Firishta (translated by John Briggs), "such was his justice, that, without his sanction, the loadstone dared not attract iron, and the kahrooba lost its power over grass." His modesty and continence were also noted. Although following the advice of Yusuf Adil Shah, Ahmad had discontinued prayers for the Bahmani Sultans after the Victory of the Garden, he soon rescinded the order and continued to hold few of the trappings of royalty.

Firishta tells the story that, when he was a young man in the campaign against Gawulgur, "there was taken among the captives a young lady of exquisite beauty, who was presented as an acceptable gift to him by one of his officers." Rather, when he found out that she was already married, he restored her to her friends and family with gifts. In fact, it was his custom when he rode through the city never to look to the left or the right to avoid looking at another man's wife.

== Death ==
Ahmad Nizam Shah died in 1508 or 1509 following a short illness, having appointed his seven-year-old son Burhan Nizam Shah I to succeed him. Ahmad Nizam Shah's tomb is located 3 Km away from Ahmednagar Fort and is known as Bagh Rauza.

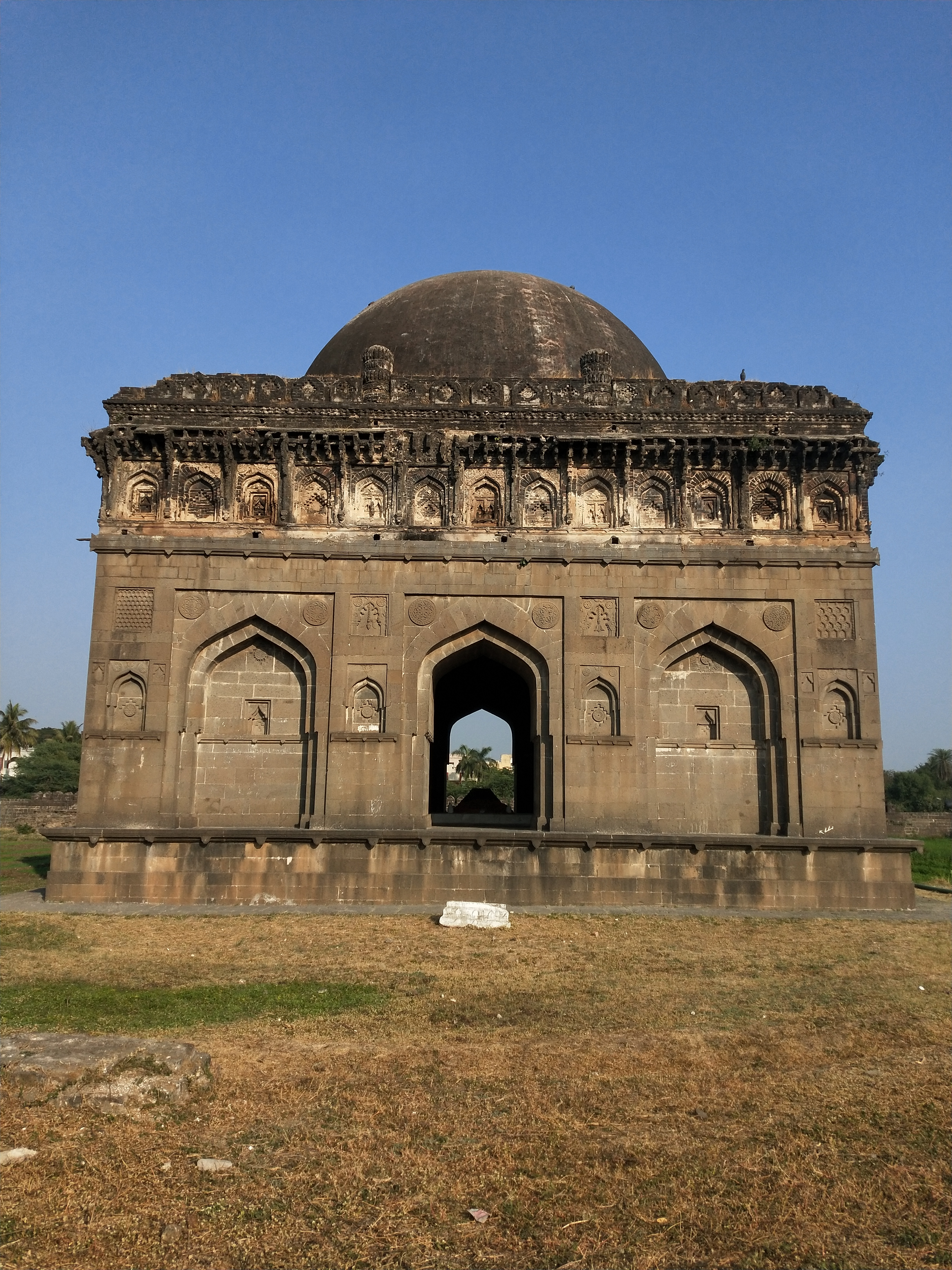
Ahmad Nizam Shah tomb Front view

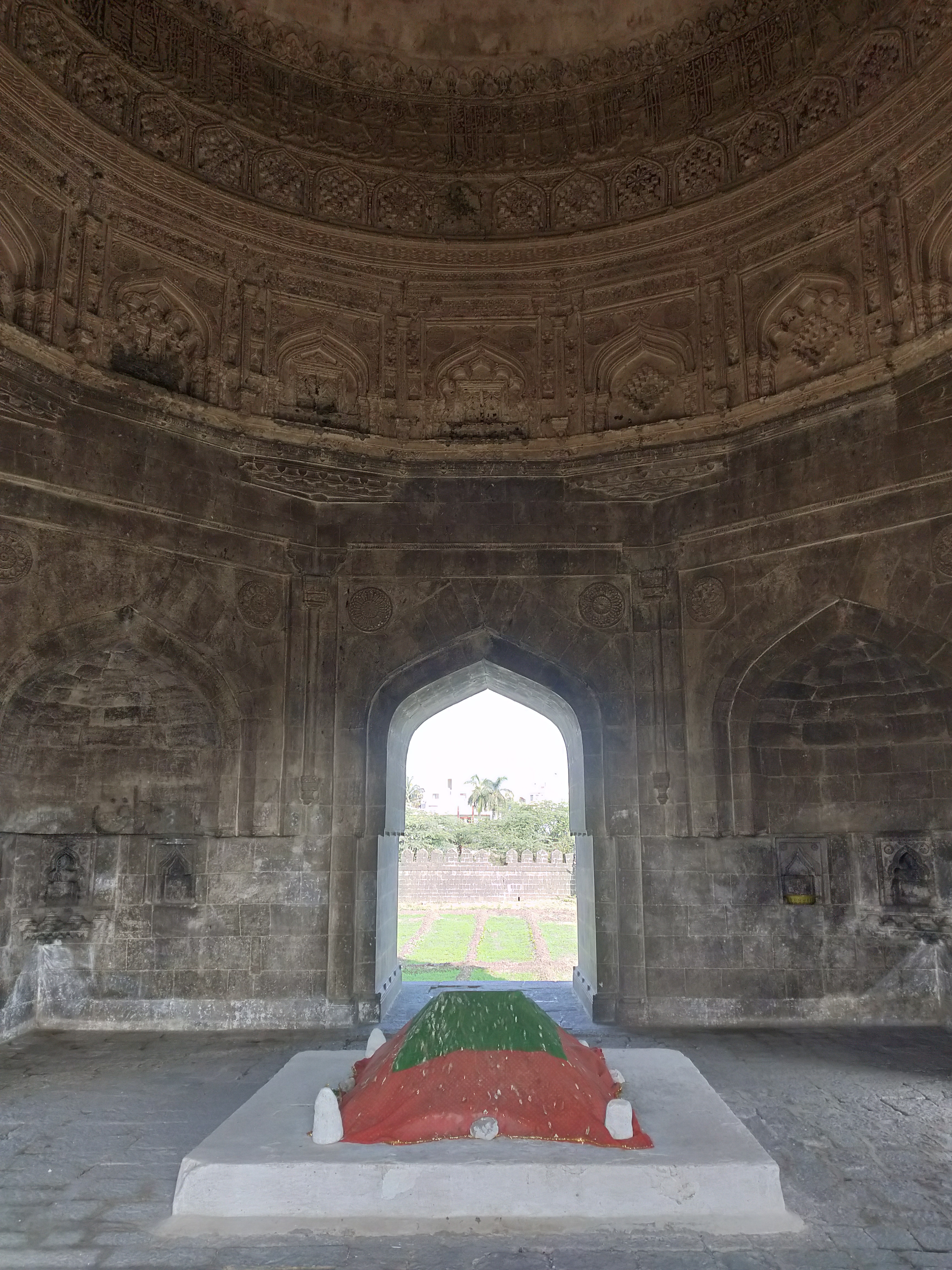
Ahmad Nizam Shah Tomb interior with grave

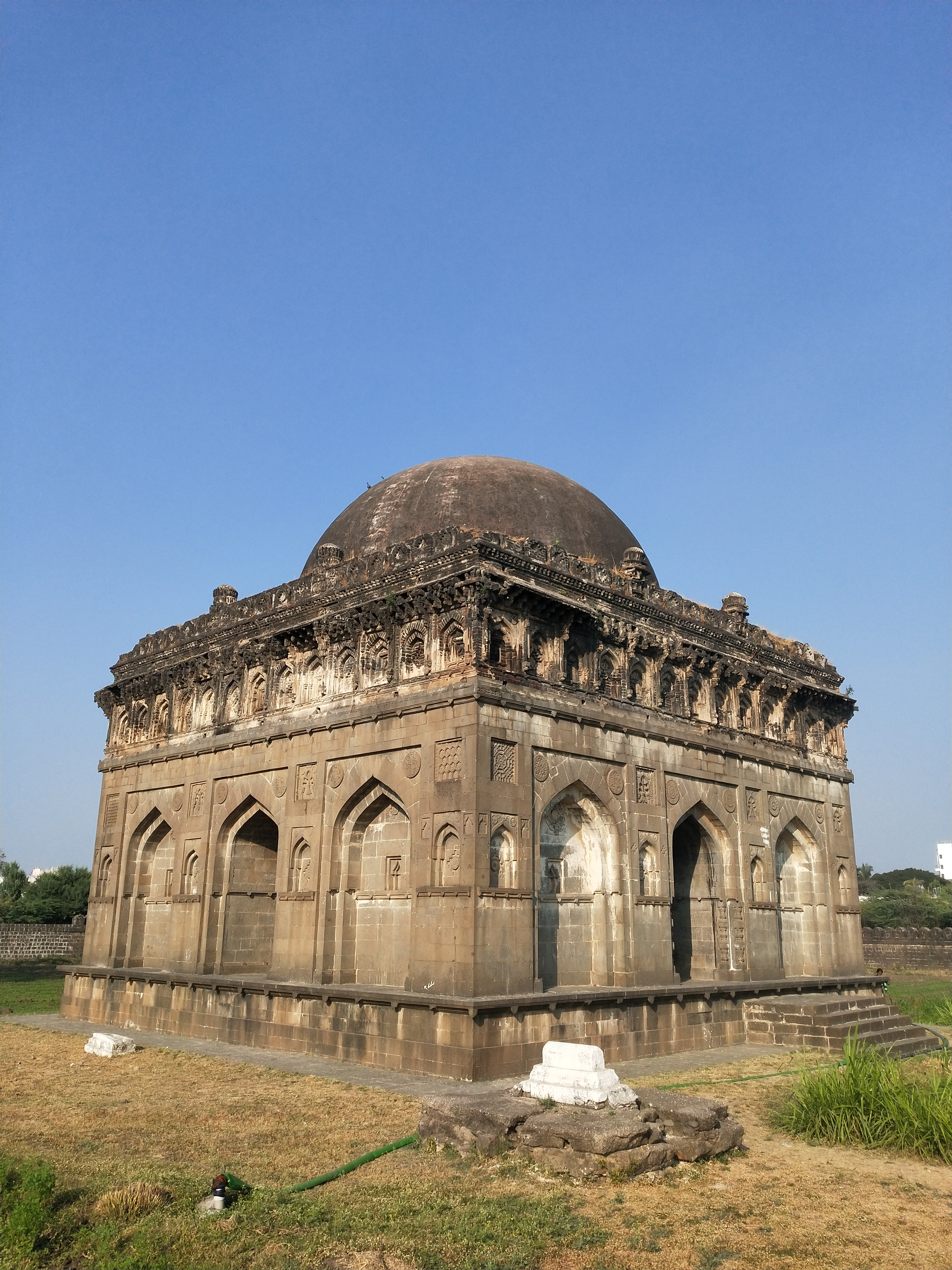
Ahmad Nizam Shah Tomb corner view

== Sources ==
Preceded by n/a	Ahmadnagar Sultanate; 1480–1509	Succeeded by Burhan Nizam Shah I
