= Mahmud Gawan =

Bahmani statesman and poet (1411–1481)

- Amir of Amirs

Peshwa of the Bahmani Sultanate
- Tenure: 1466 – 5 April 1481
- Predecessor: Jahan Turk
- Successor: Malik Hasan Bahri
- Native name: Khwaja Mahmud Gilani
- Years active: 1458–1481
- Born: 1411; Gawan, Biya-pis
- Died: 5 April 1481 (aged 69–70); Bidar, Bahmani Sultanate
- Wars and battles: Malwa–Bahmani Wars; Battle of Maheskar
- Offices: Prime minister; Wakil-us-Sultanat (chief minister); Malik-ut-Tujjar (Prince of Merchants); tarafdar of Bijapur
- Issue: Ali; Abdullah; Alaf Khan

Mahmud Gawan (born Imadu'd-din Mahmud; 1411 – 5 April 1481) was a Persian statesman who served as the chief minister, or Peshwa of the Bahmani Sultanate in India from 1458 and de facto ruler as prime minister from 1466 until his death in 1481. Mahmud Gawan, from the village of Gawan in Persia, was well-versed in Islamic theology, Persian, and the sciences and was a poet and prose writer of repute.

After emigrating from a small kingdom in Persia in 1453, Mahmud was appointed a high-ranking noble by Alau'd-din Ahmad Shah, the Sultan of the Bahmani Sultanate, and given an officer position. Upon his accession to the throne, Mahmud was made chief minister (Walik-us-Sultanat) with the title Prince of Merchants (Malik-ut-Tujjar) by Humayun Shah. He would rule as chief minister until the breakup of the five-year triumvirate regency council, himself a part of, which oversaw Sultans Nizam Shah and Muhammad Shah III Lashkari in 1466. Following the triumvirate's breakup, in which his power had been throttled by its other members, he would exercise a great deal of authority over the Bahmani kingdom in his supreme rule. During his reign, Mahmud enjoyed the trust and confidence of rulers, locals as well as that of foreign kingdoms, who had great respect for him. Amongst a factional conflict between the local (Deccanis) and foreign nobility (Afaqis), Mahmud was executed on 5 April 1481 on Sultan Muhammad III's orders over a forged treasonous document by the Afaqis faction, headed by Malik Hasan Bahri, the chief orchestrator of the plot and Mahmud's successor as prime minister.

Mahmud Gawan led many campaigns against and defended against the Sultanate's neighbors, including the Vijayanagara Empire, the Gajapati Empire, and the Malwa Sultanate, which resulted in the Bahmani Sultanate reaching its greatest territorial extent under his reign. Mahmud is notable for his construction of the Mahmud Gawan Madrasa, a large centre of religious and secular learning (madrasa) built in Bidar in 1472 which emulated another college in Persia.

== Origins ==
Mahmud Gawan was born in 1411, in the village of Gawan to a family of imperial ministers of a kingdom in Gilan, in northern Persia. His name at birth was Imadu'd-din Mahmud, according to the Persian historian Firishta, and his father's name was Jalalu'd-din Muhammad. Mahmud's family was of high rank, and according to his own account had included viziers in the city of Rasht. Political intrigues against Mahmud's family, instigated by a minister, Hajji Muhammad, and the commander of the Gilani forces, Syed Ali, succeeded in undermining the family's status, and at some point before 1440, both Mahmud and his brother, Shihabu'd-din Ahmad, left Gilan on the advice of their mother. Mahmud had three sons, Abdullah, Alaf Khan, Ali, and a brother who went to Mecca; the last of his three sons, Ali, was as well in the service of the Bahmani Sultanate and participated in a campaign against Vijayanagara, likely after Mahmud's death.

Over the next decade and more Mahmud travelled through Southwest Asia and as far west as Anatolia and Egypt, becoming a successful merchant, in horses as well as other goods, and taking opportunities for study in Cairo and Damascus. He was offered ministerial positions in the courts of Khurasan and Iraq during these years, but declined them. In 1453, aged 42, he came to the port of Dabhol, hoping to sell horses to the Bahmani Sultanate, and also planning to meet Shah Muhibbu’llah, a holy man living in Bidar, the Bahmani capital, and then to travel to Delhi. He met first with the governor of Dabhol, and then traveled to Bidar. The Bahmani sultans of the era actively recruited Persians both as scholars and administrators, and Sultan Ahmad Shah II received Mahmud favourably.

== Career ==
After introducing himself to the Bahmani court of Ahmad Shah II, Mahmud Gawan was made a noble and given charge of 1,000 calvalrymen. (Note: Mahmud Gawan had a rank of 1,000, which corresponded to the revenue he was expected to raise and the number of horsemen he was required to maintain for the crown.) and gave up his plans to travel onwards. In 1457, he was given charge of an elite formation of cavalry, and led the suppression of a minor rebellion of two family members of the sultan. Impressed with his military aptitude, Sultan Humayun Shah took him into his service upon Ahmad Shah II's death in 1459 and appointed him as Wakil-us-Sultanat, or chief minister following Ahmad Shah II's death. In Humayun Shah's accession speech, he states he appointed Mahmud as he fit the role of "one who should be clothed with the outward attributes of truth and good faith and who should inwardly be free from vices and vanity". In addition to his main role, he was given control of military affairs and was made tarafdar of Bijapur and "Prince of Merchants" (Malik-ut-Tujjar). After Humayun's death, he became one of the guardians of the underage Sultan Nizam Shah until his majority. This regency council consisted of Mahmud, the mother of Nizam Shah, and a noble named Jahan Turk. It worked well in depoliticizing the conflict between the two noble factions, the Deccanis — those native to the Deccan — and the foreigners, through the triumvirate's policy of appeasing these factions. It also deterred foreign invasions through its "unity of action" policy, which saw the regents consistently in agreement on the best course of action. This latter policy lasted until the death of Nizam Shah in 1463, and the cessation of it was the catalyst for increased factional strife.

The triumvirate continued to rule after the accession of Muhammad III, as he too was a minor. When he was fourteen years of age, the triumvirate regency came to a forced end when Jahan Turk was ordered murdered by the queen mother herself. Jahan Turk had been a disturbing force in the Sultanate by giving the new nobility positions in place of the old aristocracy, thus favouring the former and alienating the latter, and had been disliked for his rumoured embezzling of funds from the royal treasury and abuse of power. Through his influence and insistence on having his way, Jahan Turk sent Mahmud to administer the frontier provinces of the kingdom, and as he was, according to historian Haroon Khan Sherwani, "the moderating element in the Triumvirate", the stability of the state quickly collapsed. Jahan Turk was able to greatly increase his power with the absence of Mahmud, becoming the de facto ruler, and the queen mother, who took issue with this, had him killed then in 1466.

The queen mother retired from political affairs with the dissolution of the triumvirate, furthering Mahmud Gawan's lack of diplomatic and intellectual competition. A ceremony was held soon after the triumvirate's dissolution, where he was entrusted with the general supervision of all provinces (tarafs) of the Sultanate and given the title of prime minister by the queen mother in 1466, a title formerly held by Jahan Turk, ensuing Mahmud's supreme rule as the de facto ruler of the Sultanate. He was given the formal title of “Lord of the habitors of the Globe, Secretary of the Royal Mansion, Deputy of the Realm", which he was addressed as in court documents.

Mahmud Gawan's foreign policy caused a drastic shift in the diplomatic atmosphere of South India; he temporarily allied his state with Vijayanagara around 1470, and established a friendship with Mahmud Khalji of Malwa around 1468, with mutual envoys sent despite three past invasions of the kingdom by Khalji. He also strengthened diplomatic ties with Gujarat, whose ruler Mahmud Begada helped win these conflicts with Malwa.

=== Campaigns and reforms ===
Mahmud Gawan took part in and led many campaigns and enlarged the state to an extent never achieved before, with the Sultanate stretching from the Arabian Sea to the Bay of Bengal under his rule. This was accomplished through the annexation of the Konkan, the easternmost portion of Andhra, the city of Goa, and the establishment of a protectoral relationship with the Khandesh Sultanate.

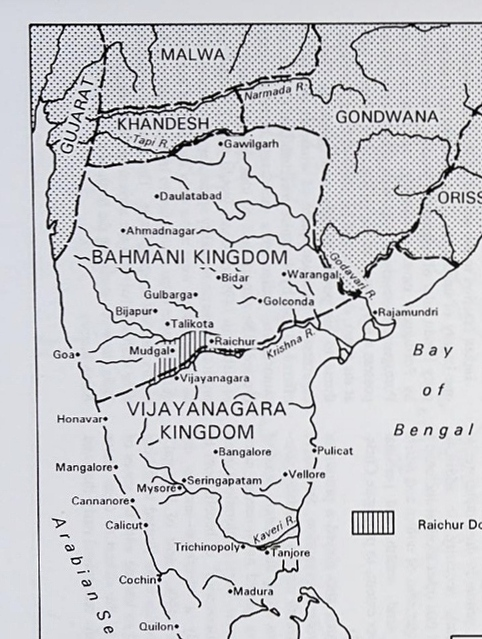
A map depicting the states of southern India in the 15th century

When the regency council took control after the accession of Nizam Shah, the rulers of Orissa, the Gajapatis, saw the Bahmani Sultanate as weak, which was typical in the presence of a regency. The Gajapati Emperor, Kapilendra Deva, saw fit to invade the Bahmani kingdom and reached as far as ten miles from the capital, Bidar. Mahmud, in addition with the other triumvirs and Nizam Shah himself, led an army against the Gajapatis and pushed them back from Bidar.

A year later, in 1462, the ruler of Malwa, Mahmud Khalji, in cooperation with the ruler of Khandesh and some other states, again invaded the Bahmani Sultanate. In the confrontation between the joint regency and the opposing side, an initial tactical advantage for the former turned into an unexpected defeat, and the Bahmani forces were forced to retreat. Following this, the court was temporarily moved to the second capital of Firozabad, and Mahmud Gawan ordered the queen to delegate Bidar Fort, the fort protecting the capital, to a high-ranking Deccani noble. Khalji began laying siege to Bidar, and advanced to the citadel after seventeen days, but was forced into raising the siege not long after by the threat of the advancing joint army of Mahmud's and the king of Gujarat, Mahmud Begada, whom Mahmud and the queen had asked for assistance, to the north, and Jahan Turk to the south. Mahmud Begada, going by way of Malwa through his insistence not to enter the Deccan, as he wished to be closer to his homeland in case of internal conflict, along with Mahmud Gawan, successfully forced Khalji of Malwa to flee to his home country by way of Gondwana, as the way north to Malwa was blocked by the Bahmani and Gujarati forces. In his flight, Khalji's already wounded army was nearly eradicated by Gondi attacks and attrition. Mahmud Khalji again invaded the following year, reaching Fathabad, but was repelled by a force that included Mahmud Gawan, again with the assistance of Mahmud Begada.

A third invasion by the Khalji of Malwa was known to be looming in 1468, and in anticipation Mahmud Gawan led forces near Khandesh, again in alliance with Gujarat. The main army of Berar, a Bahmani taraf, under the Bahmani general Yusuf Turk, besieged Kherla, then subordinate to Malwa. The Bahmanis had taken the citadel when two defenders deceived Yusuf Turk and murdered him, bringing the Khalji's forces down toward the city as a result, though a diverting of Mahmud's forces in the direction of the Khaljis's intimitaded him to retreat, ending the conflict with no clear victor. Its concluding treaty saw Kherla become a full territory of Malwa, while the Bahmanis retained all former lands, and reversed the diplomatic atmosphere of the two states to permanent friendship despite the past invasions.

Mahmud embarked on a successful campaign against the Vijayanagara Empire in 1469, conquering the city of Kanjeeveram and the entire Konkan. This campaign continued through 1472, where in it he sought to capture autonomous hill and sea forts which were hotspots for piracy and disruption in trade routes for the vital horse trade. In 1472, following a string of other victories, Mahmud captured Goa in February 1472. Goa, in addition to the also captured Dabhol, were two of the most prosperous ports of the Vijayanagara Empire. One of the objectives of the campaign had been to decrease the frequent piratical attacks on Muslim pilgrims, and the campaign's success, in addition ot granting the Bahmanis increased revenue in trade, was seen as a victory against such piracy. Virupaksha of Vijayanagara a month later tried to send forces to reclaim his losses in the Konkan, and attempted to lay siege to Goa, but was deterred by an army led by Mahmud alongside Muhammad III. Mahmud and his forces attacked and laid siege to Belgaum in the first known use of gunpowder in the Deccan. By exploiting the fort's defenses with mines and other explosives, he successfully took the city. The raja of Belgaum, in exchange for keeping his life, agreed to let his city be annexed to Mahmud, while retaining his position as overseer of the fort.

In 1473, following Mahmud's many campaigns and territorial acquisitions, he reorganised the tarafs out of both the new and old territory held by the state, increasing the number from four to eight, and distributing them equally among the Deccanis and foreigners. This was done due to the increased administrative burden and the expansion of the Sultanate's territory, both partly a result of his own prior actions. He also instituted reforms to set and standardise the payment and obligations of the nobles and to limit the provincial governor's control to the assignment of only one fort. These reforms would not be taken well by many of the nobles, whose power had been significantly curtailed.

=== Poetry and letters ===
Mahmud Gawan wrote poetry and letters, of which 148 are surviving. His collection of letters, called the Riyazul-Insha, included correspondence between many heads of state of the era, who greatly respected him. This included correspondence with Mehmed II, in which the Sultan addressed him as “Spreader of the Board of kindness and goodness, the Right Hand of the Bahmani State, Trustee of the Religion of Muhammad", Abu Sa'id Mirza and Husayn Bayqara of the Timurid Empire, and Qaitbay of the Mamluk Sultanate. He also corresponded with Persian poet Jami, in which his dominions were called the "envy of Rum itself", and corresponded with and invited to the Deccan many other poets, including Sharaf al-Din Ali Yazdi and Jalal al-Din Davani. These western contacts helped to make known the Deccan and Bahmani kingdom to the western and Islamic world, something which had been desirable for past Sultans but was expanded under Mahmud's ministership. Historian Haroon Khan Sherwani calls him "one of the most prominent Persian writers of the period."

=== Mahmud Gawan Madrasa ===
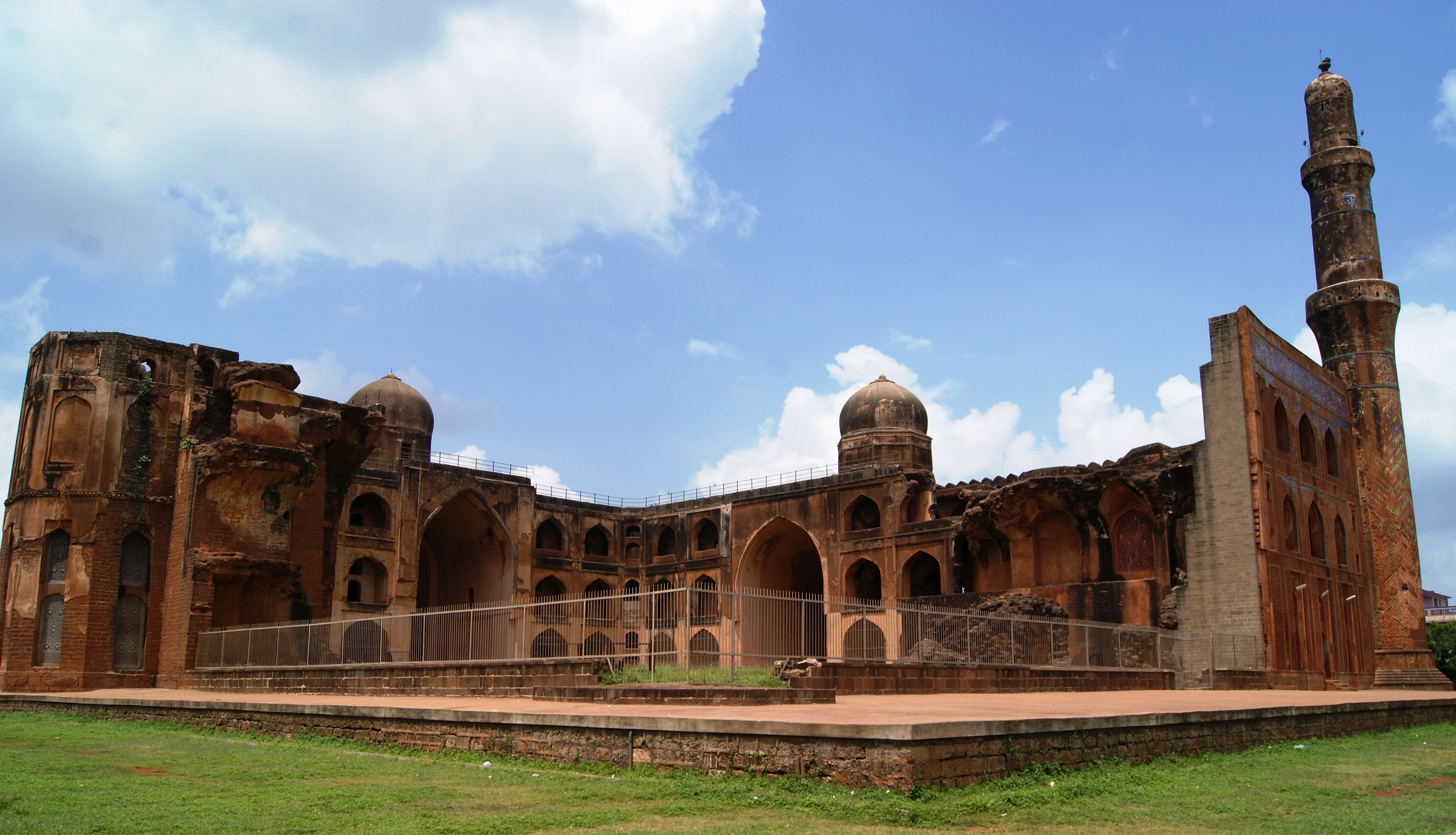
Mahmud Gawan Madrasa was built by Mahmud Gawan, a vizier of the Bahmani Sultanate as the center of learning in the Deccan.

Mahmud Gawan built a madrasa in Bidar which is known as the Mahmud Gawan Madrasa. The complex stands at the centre of Bidar's old town, and was completed in 1472. The extensive library included a collection of 3,000 manuscripts, a large amount for the era. It was a three-storied building, each floor identical in structure, with two minarets, a mosque, library, labs, lecture halls and dormitories, which overlooked a courtyard with arches on either side. Historian Richard M. Eaton describes it as an "extraordinary place", with "arches and colorful glazed tiles recalling Timurid Central Asia, and its minaret and domes reminiscent of Mamluk Egypt".

The structure significantly deteriorated in the years following its inception. The building was damaged by a gunpowder explosion and thunder storm in 1696, which collectively rid it of half of the southern wing and half its front, and it was consistently neglected and left to decay through the elements. This neglect and its ruinous state caused the madrasa to become a public dumping ground for the people's filth and rubbish. The building later underwent a significant cleanup and renovation after being taken over by the Archaeological Survey of India in 1914 in an effort to improve its appearance.

=== Deccani–Afaqi conflict and execution ===
There existed a divide between the two factions of the Deccanis, who were of local origin, and the Afaqis (alternatively gharibs), who were of foreign origin. Reasons for the divisions included the Afaqis' Shi'a beliefs, which were seen as heretical by the Deccanis, and their language: the Afaqis spoke Persian rather than Deccani. Mahmud, as he hailed from Persia and was likely Shi'a himself, was an Afaqi, so he faced many challenges. The conflict was largely depoliticized during the triumvirate's rule, but the collapse of the regency caused relations between the two parties to grow increasingly strained during Mahmud's fifteen-year supreme rule, and even more so following 1473 due to the drastic reforms issued by him which curtailed both noble factions' power. Plots arose among the Deccanis to remove him from power, and the nobles forged a treasonous document purportedly from him. This was in part motivated by the absence of Yusuf Adil Shah, leader of the Afaqi faction and then Governor of Daulatabad, as Yusuf was one of Mahmud's closest companions and thus would inform him of any conspiracy against him beforehand. The treasonable documents presented by the critics of Mahmud were letters written to the Gajapati king Purushottamadeva of Orissa, which appeared to have been written by Mahmud. The letters said that the people were dismayed by the wretchedness of the Sultan, and invited Purushottamadeva to invade the kingdom.

Sultan Muhammad Shah III did not believe Mahmud's assertion that the letter was forged, and in part a result of his drunken state, ordered him executed on 5 April 1481. The Bahmani Sultanate fell into great disarray following his execution. The Sultan later regretted his ill-thought-out decision, in part by discovering Mahmud's humble life and generous spending habits. Mahmud was ordered to be buried, though still in a small tomb disproportionate to the authority his rank had held. One year after the death of Mahmud, the Sultan also died at the age of 29. It was said that Mahmud haunted the Sultan during the last days of his life as he used to scream on his death bed that he was being killed by Mahmud. Malik Hasan Bahri, a Deccani who was one of the chief architects of the plan to have Mahmud executed, succeeded him as prime minister after his death.

The disorder caused by Mahmud's death led to the independence of the Bijapur, Ahmadnagar, and Berar Sultanates in 1490, and the Bidar Sultanate in 1492. Yusuf Adil Shah, the founder of the Bijapur Sultanate, was likely himself a former Georgian slave of Mahmud Gawan.
