= Muhammad Shah III Lashkari =

Sultan of the Bahmani Sultanate from 1463 to 1482

13th Bahmani Sultan
- Reign: 30 July 1463 – 26 March 1482
- Predecessor: Nizam-al-Din Ahmad III
- Successor: Mahmood Shah Bahmani II
- Regent: Mahmud Gawan
- Born: 1453
- Died: 26 March 1482 (aged 28–29); Bidar
- Issue: Karim Un Nisa; Mahmood Shah Bahmani II; Karim Un Nisa
- Father: Humayun Shah
- Mother: Malika-e-Jahan Nargis Begum
- Religion: Islam

Muhammad Shah III Lashkari (1453 – 26 March 1482), also known as Shamsuddin Muhammad Shah III, was the sultan of the Bahmani Sultanate from 1463 to 1482. During his reign, he successfully invaded Orissa, compelling its ruler Purushottam Deva to surrender. He also made his brother Hamvira Deva surrender by besieging Kondavidu fort.

== Ascension and Reign ==
Muhammad Shah III was between 9–10 years old when he ascended the throne on 30 July 1463 after the death of his brother, Nizam-Ud-Din Ahmad III. His Malik ut-Tujjar, Mahmud Gawan was appointed vizier and served as one of the regents under the queen dowager, Makhduma-e-Jahan Nargis Begum. With Gawan, Muhammad Shah subjugated most of the Konkan and defeated the Gajapati Kingdom in 1470, thus securing the west coast trade until the arrival of the Portuguese. At the same time, standard measurements and valuations of agricultural land were introduced, along with other policies to unify the sultanate. Unfortunately, these actions upset many powerful people who convinced Muhammad Shah III to execute Mahmud Gawan in 1481.

== Invasion of Orissa ==
The Bahmani invasion of Orissa in the 15th century unfolded through a series of conflicts and diplomatic maneuvers between the Gajapati Empire and the Bahmani Sultanate. In 1475, a Bahmani rebel officer named Bhimraj initiated a revolt at Kondavidu, a Bahmani territory, leading to a complex alliance among the Gajapatis and chiefs of Telangana and Jajnagar. The Sultan successfully defeated them and forced Purushottam Dev to surrender. Tensions heightened in 1478 when Muhammad Shah III invaded Orissa.

Alarmed by the invasion, Purushottam Dev expressed his willingness to pay homage, offering to disarm and present gifts. The Sultan accepted this homage, confirming Purushottam as the ruler of his patrimony. Subsequently, Muhammad Shah III besieged Hamvira Deva, the brother of the Gajapati, successfully ending his career in tragedy. These events, including the earlier revolt at Kondavidu, became integral aspects of Muhammad Shah III's engagement with the Gajapati Empire, shaping the historical narrative during his reign.

== Succession ==
Soon after the death of Gawan, the sultan himself died of remorse on 26 March 1482 at Bidar. He was succeeded by his son, Mahmood Shah Bahmani II.

== Family ==
Muhammad Shah III is known to have at least two daughters and one son.

- Khunza Nizam, she married Mirza Adham, the youngest son of Khunza Humaira, daughter of Alau'd-din Ahmad Shah.
- Mahmud Shah Bahmani II, fourteenth Bahmani Sultan
- Khunza Fatima. She married Shah Habibullah, a grandson of Khunza Humaira, and thus a great-grandson of Alau'd-din Ahmad Shah.
