= Humayun Shah =

Sultan of the Bahmani Sultanate from 1458 to 1461

11th Bahmani Sultan
- Reign: 7 May 1458 – 1 September 1461
- Predecessor: Alau'd-din Ahmad Shah
- Successor: Nizam-Ud-Din Ahmad III
- Died: 1 September 1461
- Burial: Bahmani tombs
- Spouse: Nargis Begum
- Issue: Hamida Sultan; Nizam-Ud-Din Ahmad III; Muhammad Shah III Lashkari; Jamshid; Ahmad
- Father: Alau'd-din Ahmad Shah

Alauddin Humayun Shah Bahmani was the sultan of the Bahmani Sultanate, who reigned between 1458 and 1461. Also known as Humayun Shah Zalim (lit. 'Humayun Shah the cruel'), he is described as a cruel ruler, known for executing people in torturous ways.

== Biography ==
Humayun was the eldest son of Alau'd-din Ahmad Shah. Upon Alauddin's death, a group of noblemen, including Saif Khan, Mallu Khan, and Shah Habibullah installed Hasan Khan, Humayun's younger brother as king. Humayun, along with his personal guard of eighty horsemen managed to secure the throne. Saif Khan was executed, Mallu Khan fled to the Carnatic, and Hasan Khan and Shah Habibullah were imprisoned. Upon his enthronement, Humayun appointed Mahmud Gawan lieutenant of the kingdom and governor of Bijapur, ennobling him with the title of Malik-ut-Tujjar.

Sikandar Khan, a cousin of Humayun, was given charge of Telangana. Still dissatisfied by the appointment, he began a rebellion, supported by his father Jalal Khan and local Velama chiefs. The rebels began a march towards Golconda. Humayun proceeded to meet the rebels, and offered terms of peace to Sikandar, which were refused. Sikandar was killed in the ensuing battle, and his army defeated. While Humayun was in Telangana, Hasan Khan was released from prison by means of fraud. Hasan Khan proclaimed himself the king at Bir, but was defeated by Humayun's forces and Hasan fled towards Vijayanagara. However, he was imprisoned by Siraj Khan Junaidi and sent to the capital. In 1460, Hasan and his party were brought to Bidar. It is at this time that the cruel punishments of Humayun were described—Hasan Khan was thrown before a tiger, which proceeded to maul and devour him, while some of his followers were cast into boiling cauldrons. Elephants and other wild animals were released upon others.

Humayun died, either naturally, or was killed by a maid-servant in his sleep on 1 September 1461. He was succeeded by his son Nizamuddin, with his wife, Nargis Begum, taking up the regency for their son.

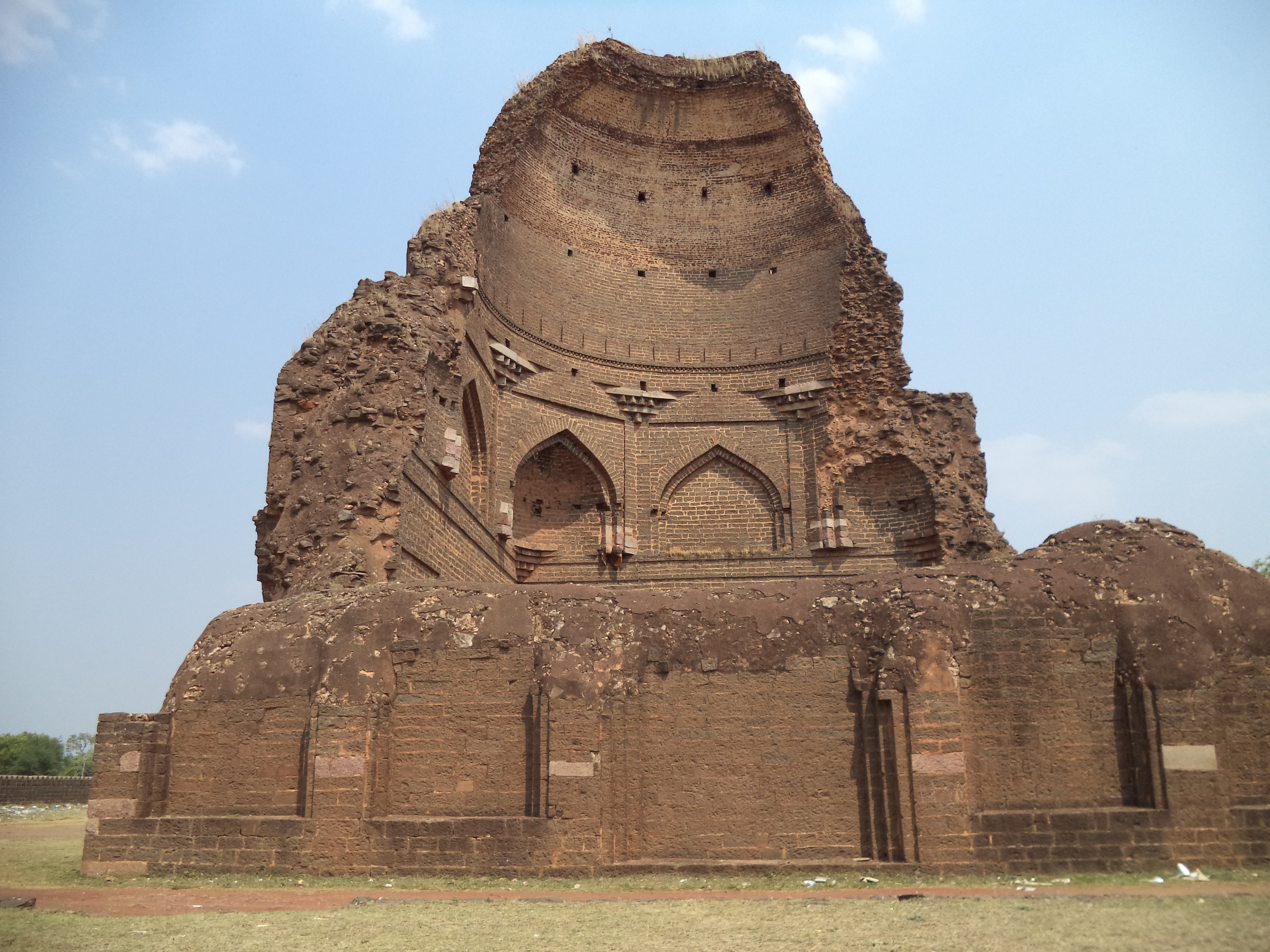
The partially collapsed tomb of Humayun Shah

His tomb is located within the Bahmani tombs complex, and is partially collapsed. According to legend, the tomb split open when Humayun's body was interred, thus signifying that god refused protection for his remains. In fact, the damage to the tomb is due to a lightning strike in the 19th century. He was succeeded by his son, Nizam

=== Cruelty ===
Firishta describes Humayun as an especially cruel figure, with the sobriquet Zalim. According to modern scholars such as Haroon Khan Sherwani and Ghulam Yazdani, the accounts of Humayun's cruelty have been exaggerated. Sherwani described him as a ruler of the "ordinary Bahmani type", albeit a strict disciplinarian.

== Family ==
Humayun Shah married Nargis Begum, a daughter of prince Mubarak Khan, and thus a granddaughter of Taj ud-Din Firuz Shah. They had five children:

- Hamida Sultan;
- Nizam-Ud-Din Ahmad III, twelfth Bahmani Sultan;
- Muhammad Shah III Lashkari, thirteenth Bahmani Sultan;
- Jamshid
- Ahmad.
