= John Briggs (East India Company officer) =

British East India Company officer

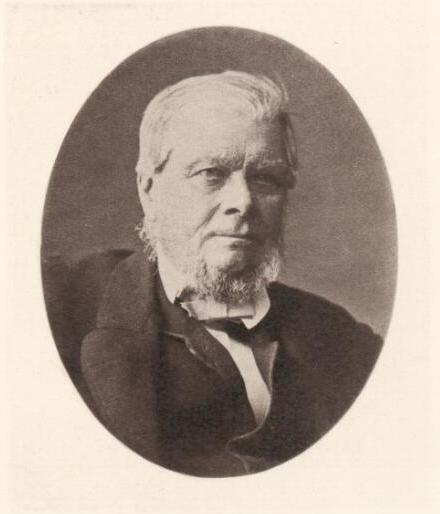
- Born: 1785
- Died: 27 April 1875 (aged 89–90)
- Military career
- Rank: general
- Unit: Madras Infantry
- Conflicts: Mahratta wars

Signature
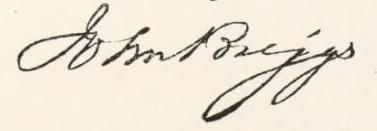

General John Briggs (1785–1875) was a British officer in the army of the East India Company, and an author.

== Life ==
Briggs entered the Madras Infantry in 1801. He took part in the Mahratta wars, serving in the final campaign as a political officer under Sir John Malcolm, whom he had previously accompanied on his mission to Persia in 1810. He was one of Mountstuart Elphinstone's assistants in the Dekhan, subsequently served in Khandesh, and succeeded Captain Grant Duff as resident at Sattára.

In 1831 Briggs was appointed Chief Commissioner of Mysore when the administration of that state was assumed by the British. His appointment to this office, which was made by the governor-general Lord William Bentinck, was not agreeable to the government of Madras, and after a stormy tenure which lasted around a year, Briggs resigned his post in September 1832. He was transferred to the residency of Nágpur, where he remained until 1835. In that year he left India, and never returned. In 1838 he attained the military rank of major-general. He became then lieutenant-general (1851) and full general on 6 February 1861.

After his return to England he took a prominent part as a member of the court of directors of the East India Company in the discussion of Indian affairs, and was an opponent of Lord Dalhousie's annexation policy. He was also an active member of the Anti-Corn-law League.

Briggs was elected a fellow of the Royal Society in recognition of his proficiency in oriental literature. He died at Burgess Hill, Sussex, on 27 April 1875, at the age of eighty-nine.

== Works ==
He was a good Persian scholar, and translated Ferishta's Mohammadan Power in India, and the Siyar-ul-Murákhirin, which recorded the decline of Moghul power. He was also the author of an essay on the land tax of India, and in a series of Letters Addressed to a Young Person in India he discussed questions on the conduct of army officers, and civil servants, and especially their treatment of Indians. In 1836, he wrote an essay length tract advocating the professional training of the Indian Officer class of the East India Company's armies. Indian officers provided the crucial command, control and communication functions between British officers and the rank-and-file Indian sepoys and sowars.

Political offices
Preceded by Krishnaraja Wadiyar III (As Maharajah of Mysore)	Senior Commissioner of Mysore; 1831-1832	Succeeded by W. Morrison
