= Bahmani Kingdom =

Kingdom in the Deccan (1347–1527)

- 1347–1527
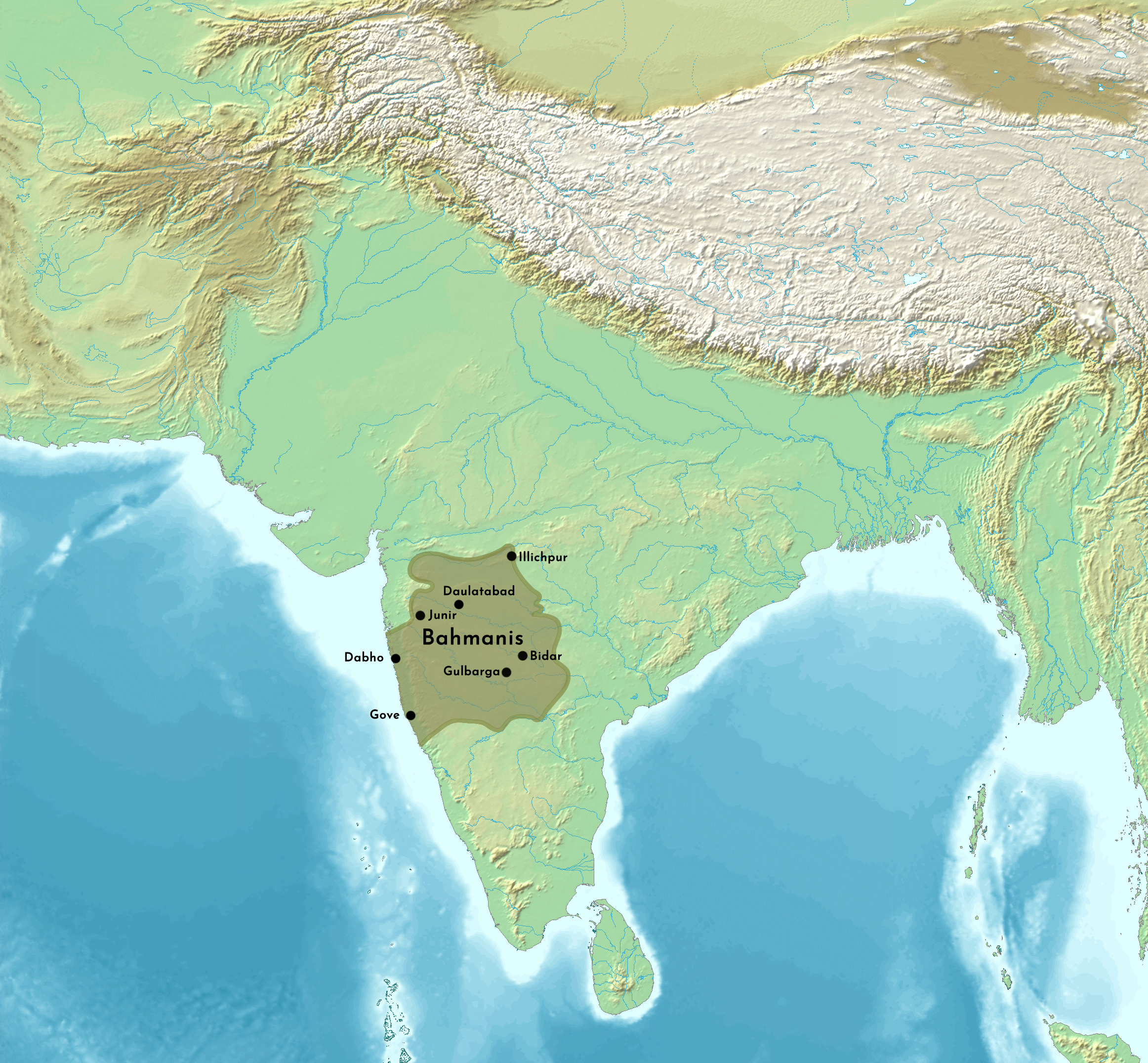
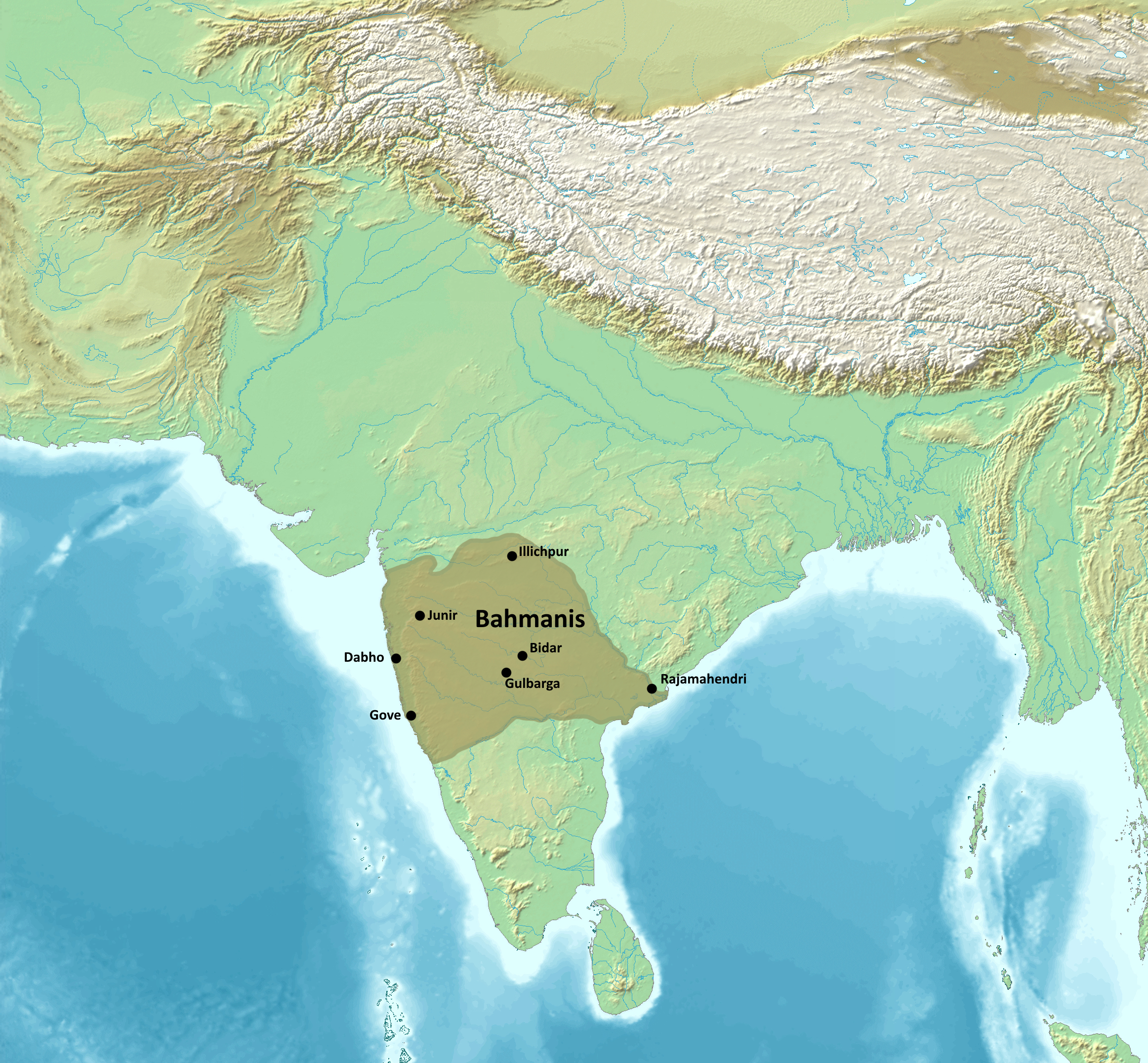
- Capital: Gulbarga (1347–1425); Bidar (1425–1527)
- Official languages: Persian
- Common languages: Kannada; Deccani; Marathi; Telugu
- Religion: Sunni Islam; Shia Islam
- Government: Monarchy
- Sultan
  - 1347–1358: Ala-ud-Din Bahman Shah
  - 1358–1375: Mohammed Shah I
  - 1375–1378: Mujahid Shah
  - 1378: Daud Shah Bahmani
  - 1525–1527: Kalim-Allah Shah
- Historical era: Medieval India
  - Established: 3 August 1347
  - Disestablished: 1527
- Currency: Taka
Preceded by
Delhi Sultanate
Succeeded by
Bijapur Sultanate
Golconda Sultanate
Ahmadnagar Sultanate
Berar Sultanate
Bidar Sultanate
- Today part of: India

The Bahmani Kingdom, or the Bahmani Sultanate, was a late medieval Persianate kingdom that ruled the Deccan Plateau in India. The first independent Muslim sultanate of the Deccan, the Bahmani Kingdom came to power in 1347 during the rebellion of Ismail Mukh against Muhammad bin Tughlaq, the Sultan of Delhi. Ismail Mukh then abdicated in favour of Zafar Khan, who established the Bahmani Sultanate.

The Bahmani Kingdom was perpetually at war with its neighbours, including its rival to the south, the Vijayanagara Empire, which outlasted the sultanate. The Mahmud Gawan Madrasa was created by Mahmud Gawan, the vizier regent of the sultanate from 1466 until his execution in 1481, during a conflict between the foreign (Afaqis) and local (Deccanis) nobility. Bidar Fort was built by Ahmad Shah I (r. 1422–1436), who relocated the capital to the city of Bidar. Ahmad Shah led campaigns against Vijayanagara and the sultanates of Malwa and Gujarat. His campaign against Vijayanagara in 1423 included a siege of the capital, ending in the expansion of the Sultanate. Mahmud Gawan would later lead campaigns against Malwa, Vijayanagara, and the Gajapatis, and extended the sultanate to its maximum extent.

The sultanate began to decline under Mahmood Shah. Through a combination of factional strife and the revolt of five provincial governors (tarafdars), the Bahmani Sultanate split up into five states, known as the Deccan Sultanates. The initial revolts of Yusuf Adil Shah, Malik Ahmad Nizam Shah I, and Fathullah Imad-ul-Mulk in 1490, and Qasim Barid I in 1492 saw the end of any real Bahmani power, and the last independent sultanate, Golkonda, in 1518, ended the Bahmanis' 180-year rule over the Deccan. The last four Bahmani rulers were puppet monarchs under Amir Barid I of the Bidar Sultanate, and the kingdom formally dissolved in 1527.

== Origin ==
Abd-al-Malek Esami, a contemporary historian, states that Bahman Shah was born in Ghazni, Afghanistan. He was either of Afghan or Turk origin. Encyclopedia Iranica states him to be a Khorasani adventurer, who claimed descent from Bahram Gur. Ferishta mentions that later poets "who wanted to flatter him" called Bahman Shah a descendant of Bahram Gur, but considers it implausible. Andre Wink, known for his studies on India, stated that he was an Afghan. According to the medieval historian Ferishta, his obscurity makes it difficult to track his origin, but he is nonetheless stated to be of Afghan birth.

== History ==
Ziauddin Barani, the court chronicler of Sultan Firuz Shah, states that Hasan Gangu, the Bahmani Sultanate's founder, was "born in very humble circumstances" and that "For the first thirty years of his life he was nothing more than a field laborer." He was made a commander of a hundred horsemen by the Delhi Sultan, Muhammad bin Tughluq, who was pleased with his honesty. This sudden rise in the military and socio-economic ladder was common in this era of Muslim India. Zafar Khan or Hasan Gangu was among the inhabitants of Delhi who were forced to migrate to the Deccan, to build a large Muslim settlement in the region of Daulatabad. Zafar Khan was a man of ambition and looked forward to the adventure. He had long hoped to employ his body of horsemen in the Deccan as the region was seen as the place of bounty in Muslim imagination at the time. He was rewarded with an Iqta for taking part in the conquest of Kampili.

=== Rise ===
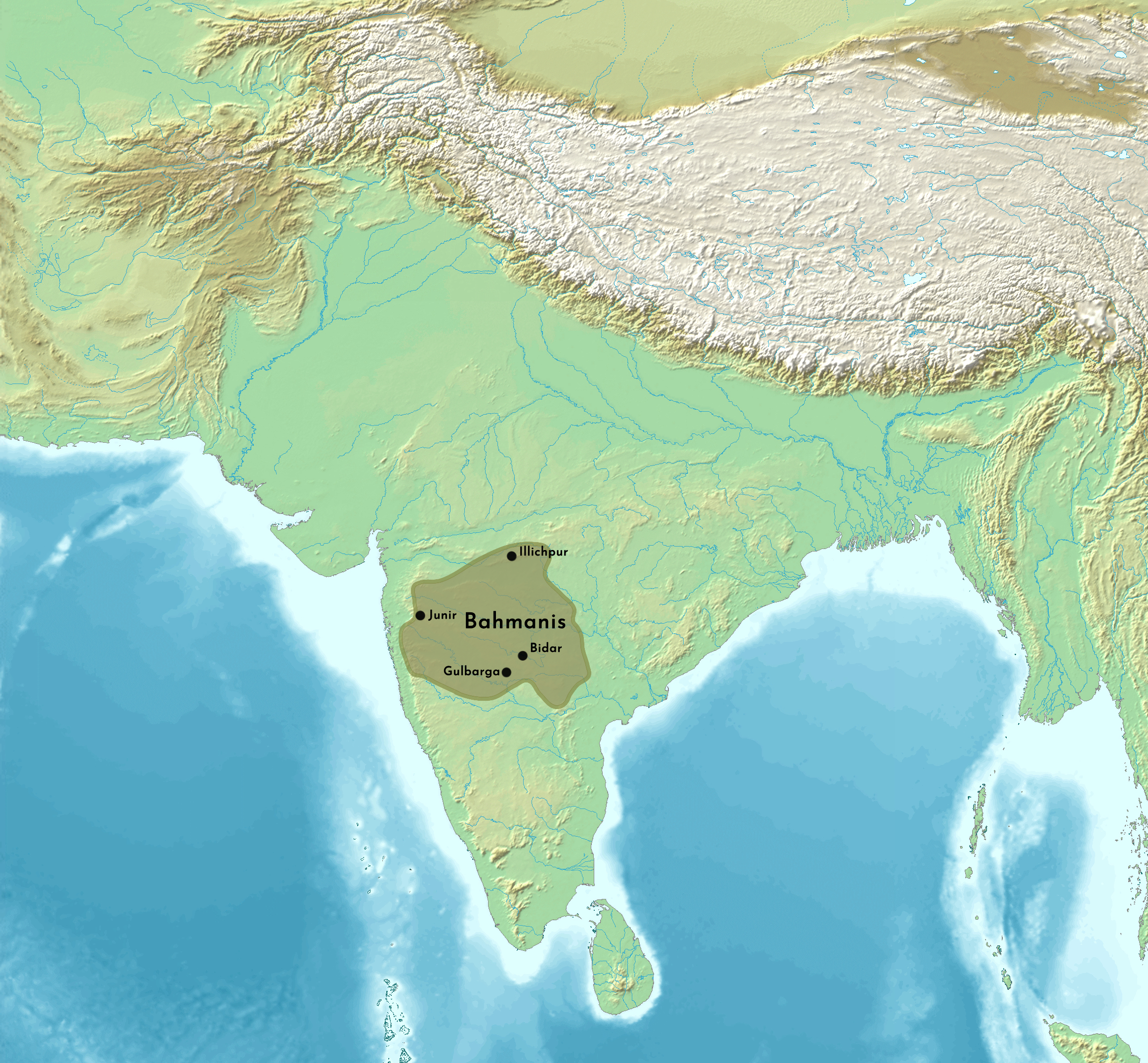
Territories under direct Bahmani control (1390–1482)

The Bahmani Sultanate and main South Asian polities in 1400 CE

Before the establishment of his kingdom, Hasan Gangu (Zafar Khan) was Governor of Deccan and a commander on behalf of the Tughlaqs. On 3 August 1347, during the rebellion by the Amirs of the Deccan, Ismail Mukh, the leader of the rebellion (whom the rebel amirs of the Deccan placed on the throne of Daulatabad in 1345), abdicated in favor of Zafar Khan, resulting in the establishment of the Bahmani Kingdom. The Sultan of Delhi had besieged the rebels at the citadel of Daulatabad. As another rebellion had begun in Gujarat, the Sultan left and installed Shaikh Burhan-ud-din Bilgrami and Malik Jauhar and other nobles in charge of the siege. Meanwhile, as these nobles were unable to stop the Deccani amirs from pursuing the imperial army, Hasan Gangu, a native of Delhi, then being pursued by Governor of Berar Imad-ul-Mulk, the leader to whom the Deccani Amirs had re-assembled against, attacked and slew the latter and marched on towards Daulatabad. Here Hasan Gangu and the Deccani amirs put to flight the imperial forces which had been left to besiege. The rebels at Daulatabad had the sense to see Hasan Gangu as the man of the hour, and the proposal to crown Hasan Gangu, entitled Zafar Khan, was accepted without a dissentient voice on 3 August 1347. His revolt was successful, and he established an independent state on the Deccan within the Delhi Sultanate's southern provinces with its headquarters at Hasanabad (Gulbarga), where all his coins were minted.

With the support of the influential Indian Chishti Sufi Shaikhs, he was crowned "Alauddin Bahman Shah Sultan – Founder of the Bahmani Dynasty". They bestowed upon him a robe allegedly worn by the prophet Muhammad. The extension of the Sufi's notion of spiritual sovereignty lent legitimacy to the planting of the sultanate's political authority, where the land, people, and produce of the Deccan were merited state protection, no longer available for plunder with impunity. These Sufis legitimized the transplantation of Indo-Muslim rulership from one region in South Asia to another, converting the land of the Bahmanids into being recognized as Dar ul-Islam, while it was previously considered Dar ul-Harb.

Turkish or Indo-Turkish troops, explorers, saints, and scholars moved from Delhi and North India to the Deccan with the establishment of the Bahmanid sultanate. How many of these were Shi'ites is unclear. Nonetheless, there is enough evidence to demonstrate that a number of nobility at the Bahmani court identified as Shi'ites or had significant Shi'ite inclinations. (Note: Stephen F. Dale refers to the Bahmanis as Shi'i Muslims.)

=== Succeeding rulers (1358–1422) ===
Alauddin was succeeded by his son Mohammed Shah I. His conflicts with the Vijayanagar empire were singularly savage wars, as according to the historian Ferishta, "the population of the Carnatic was so reduced that it did not recover for several ages." The Bahmanids' aggressive confrontation with the two main Hindu kingdoms of the southern Deccan, Warangal and Vijayanagara in the First Bahmani–Vijayanagar War, made them renowned among Muslims as warriors of the faith.

The Vijayanagara empire and the Bahmanids fought over the control of the Godavari-basin, Tungabadhra Doab, and the Marathwada country, although they seldom required a pretext for declaring war, as military conflicts were almost a regular feature and lasted as long as these kingdoms continued. Military slavery involved captured slaves from Vijayanagara whom were then converted to Islam and integrated into the host society, so they could begin military careers within the Bahmanid empire. Mohammad Shah II's reign was noted for its peace and lack of foreign wars. Strong measures of civil and military organizations were set up by Mohammad Shah I, but they developed only during Mohammad Shah II's rule.

Ghiyasuddin succeeded his father Muhammad II at the age of seventeen in April 1397, but was blinded and imprisoned by a Turkic slave called Taghalchin, who had held a grudge on the Sultan for the latter's refusal to appoint him as a governor. He had lured the Sultan into putting himself in the former's power, using the beauty of his daughter, who was accomplished in music and arts, and had introduced her to the Sultan at a feast. He was succeeded by Shamsuddin, who was a puppet king under Taghalchin. Firuz and Ahmed, the sons of the fourth sultan Daud, marched to Gulbarga to avenge Ghiyasuddin. Firuz declared himself the sultan, and defeated Taghalchin's forces. Taghalchin was killed and Shamsuddin was blinded.

Taj ud-Din Firuz Shah became the sultan in November 1397. Firuz Shah fought against the Vijayanagara Empire on many occasions and the rivalry between the two dynasties continued unabated throughout his reign, with victories in 1398 and in 1406, but a defeat in 1417. One of his victories resulted in his marriage to the daughter of Deva Raya, the Vijayanagara Emperor.

Firuz Shah expanded the nobility by enabling Hindus and granting them high office. In his reign, Sufis such as Gesudaraz, a Chishti saint who had immigrated from Dehli to Daulatabad, were prominent in court and daily life. He was the first author to write in the Dakhni dialect of Urdu. The Dakhni language became widespread, practised by various milieus from the court to the Sufis. It was established as a lingua franca of the Muslims of the Deccan, as not only the aspect of a dominant urban elite, but an expression of the regional religious identity.

=== Later rulers (1422–1482) ===
Firuz Shah was succeeded by his younger brother Ahmad Shah I Wali. Following the establishment of Bidar as capital of the sultanate in 1429, Ahmad Shah I converted to Shi'ism. Ahmad Shah's reign was marked by relentless military campaigns and expansionism. He imposed destruction and slaughter on Vijayanagara and finally captured the remnants of Warangal.

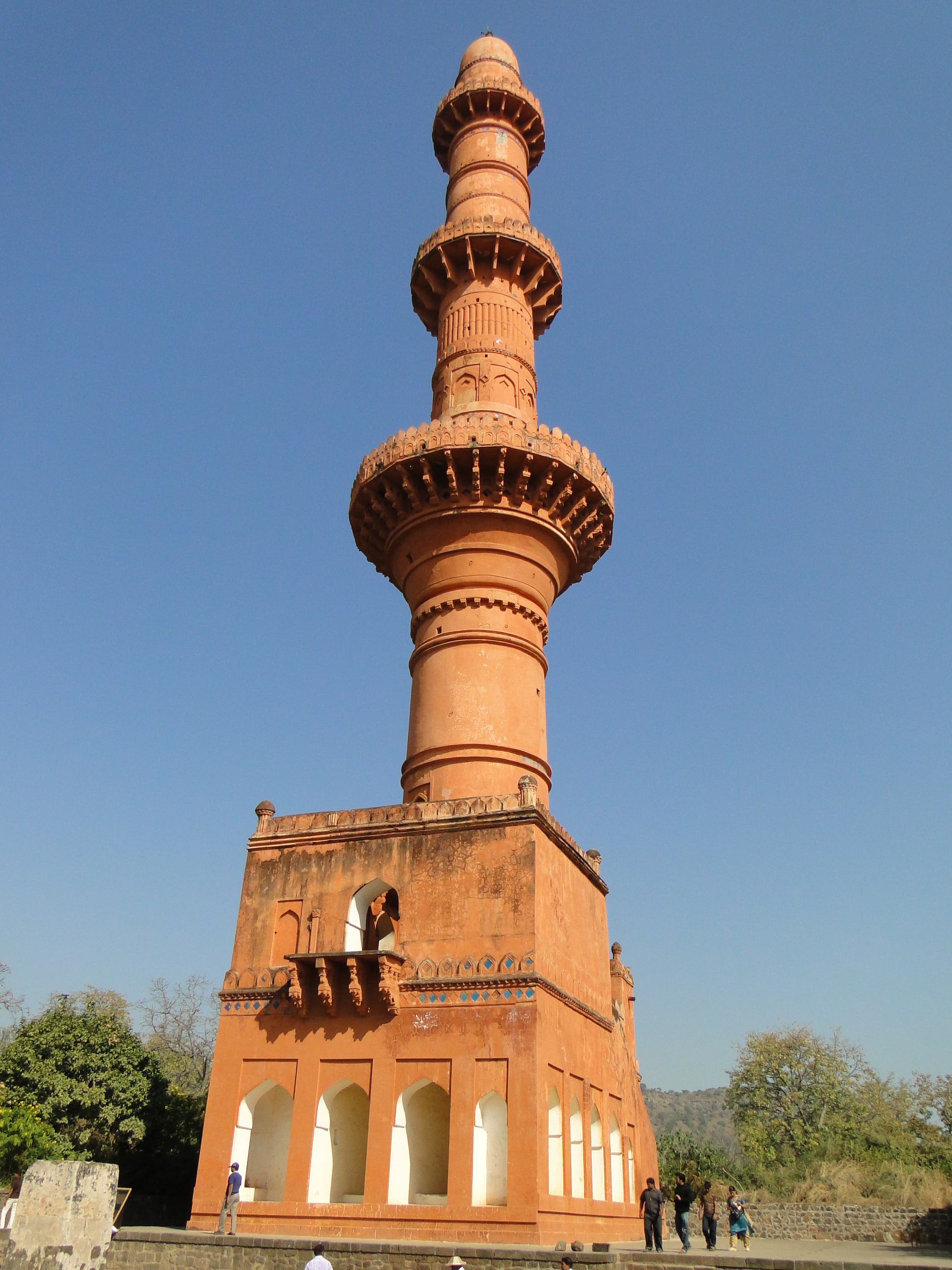
Chand Minar at Daulatabad fort complex

Alauddin Ahmad II succeeded his father to the throne in 1436. The Chand Minar, a minaret in Daulatabad, was constructed under his reign, and was commemorated in his honour in 1445 for his victory against Deva Raya II of Vijayanagara in 1443, the last major conflict between the two powers. For the first half-century after the establishment of the Bahmanids, the original North Indian colonists and their sons had administered the empire quite independent of either the non-Muslim Hindus, or the Muslim foreign immigrants. However, the later Bahmani Sultans, mainly starting from his father Ahmad Shah Wali I, began to recruit foreigners from overseas, whether because of depletion among the ranks of the original settlers, or the feelings of dependency upon the Persian courtly model, or both. This resulted in factional strife that first became acute in the reign of his son Alauddin Ahmad Shah II. In 1446, the powerful Dakhani nobles persuaded the Sultan that the Persians were responsible for the failure of the earlier invasion of the Konkan.

The Sultan, drunk, condoned a large-scale massacre of Persian Shi'a Sayyids by the Sunni Dakhani nobles and their Sunni Abyssinian slaves. A few survivors escaped the massacre dressed in women's clothing and convinced the Sultan of their innocence. Ashamed of his own folly, the Sultan punished the Dakhani leaders who were responsible for the massacre, putting them to death or throwing them in prison, and reduced their families to beggary. The accounts of the violent events likely included exaggerations as it came from the pen of the chroniclers who were themselves mainly foreigners and products of Safavid Persia.

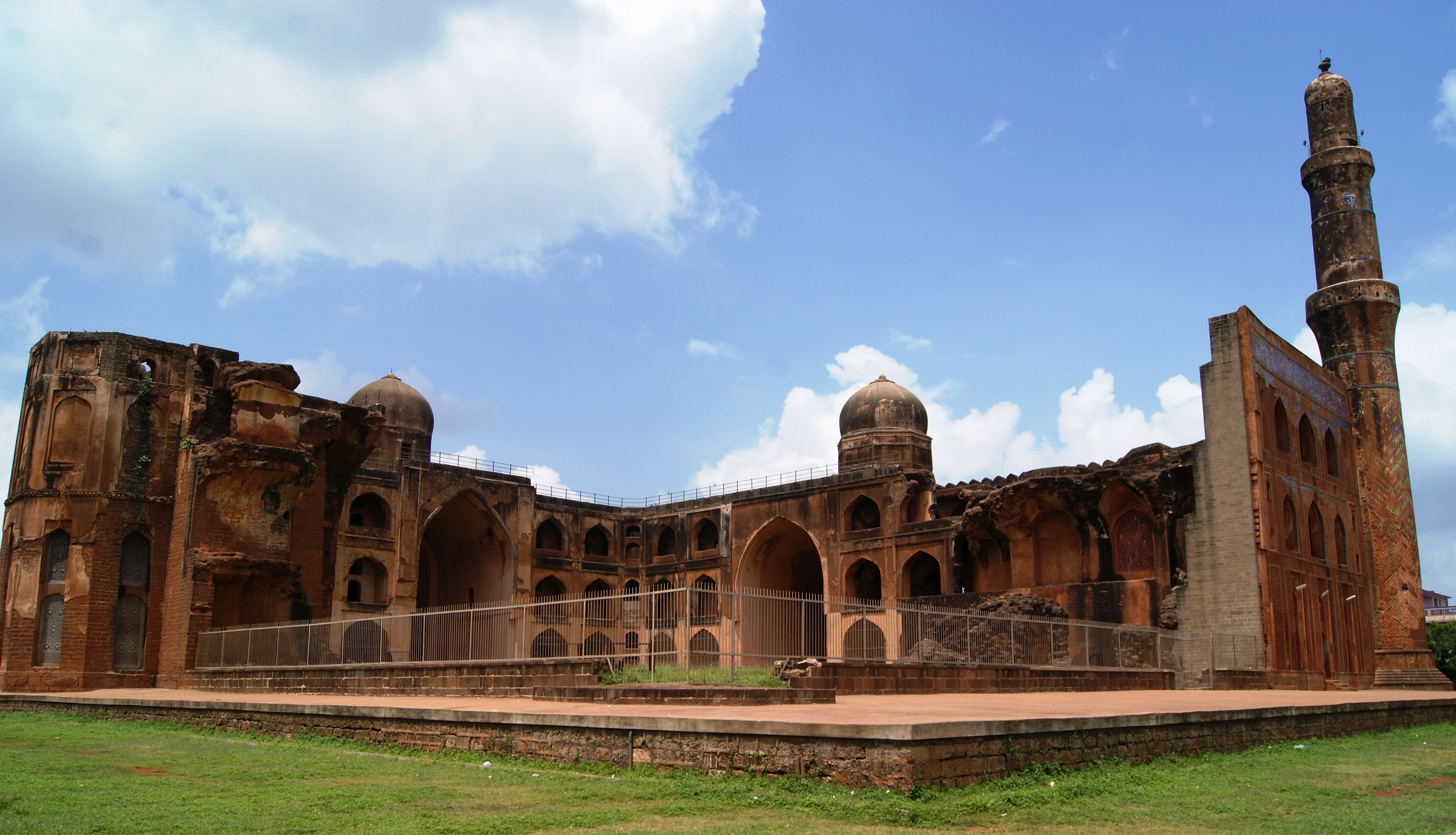
Mahmud Gawan Madrasa, built by Mahmud Gawan to be the centre of religious as well as secular education

The eldest sons of Humayun Shah, Nizam-Ud-Din Ahmad III and Muhammad Shah III Lashkari ascended the throne successively, while they were young boys. The vizier Mahmud Gawan ruled as regent during this period, until Muhammad Shah reached age. Mahmud Gawan is known for setting up the Mahmud Gawan Madrasa, a center of religious as well as secular education, as well as achieving the sultanate's greatest extent during his rule. He also increased the administrative divisions of the sultanate from four to eight to ease the administrative burden from previous expansion of the state. Gawan was considered a great statesman, and a poet of repute.

Mahmud Gawan was caught in a struggle between a rivalry between two groups of nobles, the Dakhanis and the Afaqis. The Dakhanis made up the indigenous Muslim elite of the Bahmanid dynasty, being descendants of Sunni immigrants from Northern India, while the Afaqis were foreign newcomers from the west such as Gawan, who were mostly Shi'is. The Dakhanis believed that the privileges, patronage and positions of power in the sultanate should have been reserved solely for them.

The divisions included sectarian religious divisions where the Afaqis were looked upon as heretics by the Sunnis as the former were Shi'as. Eaton cites a linguistic divide where the Dakhanis spoke Dakhni while the Afaqis favored the Persian language. Mahmud Gawan had tried to reconcile with the two factions over his fifteen-year prime ministership, but had found it difficult to win their confidence; the party strife could not be stopped. His Afaqis opponents, led by Nizam-ul-Mulk Bahri and motivated by anger over Mahmud's reforms which had curtailed the nobility's power, fabricated a treasonous letter to Purushottama Deva of Orissa which they purported to be from him. Mahmud Gawan was ordered executed by Muhammad Shah III, an act that the latter regretted until his death in 1482. Upon his death, Nizam-ul-Mulk Bahri, the father of the founder of the Nizam Shahi dynasty became the regent of the Sultan as prime minister.

=== Decline ===
Muhammad Shah III Lashkari was succeeded by his son Mahmood Shah Bahmani II, the last Bahmani ruler to have real power. The tarafdars of Ahmednagar, Bijapur, and Berar, Malik Ahmad Nizam Shah I, Yusuf Adil Shah, and Fathullah Imad-ul-Mulk agreed to assert their independence in 1490, and established their own sultanates but maintained loyalty to the Bahmani Sultan. The sultanates of Golconda and Bidar would become in practice independent as well. In 1501, Mahmood Shah Bahmani united his amirs and wazirs in an agreement to wage annual Jihad against Vijayanagara. The expeditions were financially ruinous.

The last Bahmani Sultans were puppet monarchs under their Barid Shahi prime ministers, who were the de facto rulers. After 1518 the sultanate formally broke up into the five states of Ahmednagar, Berar, Bidar, Bijapur, and Golconda. They are collectively known as the Deccan Sultanates.

== Historiography ==
Modern scholars like Haroon Khan Sherwani and Richard M. Eaton have based their accounts of the Bahmani dynasty mainly upon the medieval chronicles of Firishta and Syed Ali Tabatabai. Other contemporary works were the Sivatattva Chintamani, a Kannada language encyclopedia on the beliefs and rites of the Veerashaiva faith, and Guru Charitra. Afanasy Nikitin, a Russian merchant and traveler, traveled through the Bahmani Sultanate in his journeys. He contrasts the huge "wealth of the nobility with the wretchedness of the peasantry and the frugality of the Hindus".

== Culture ==
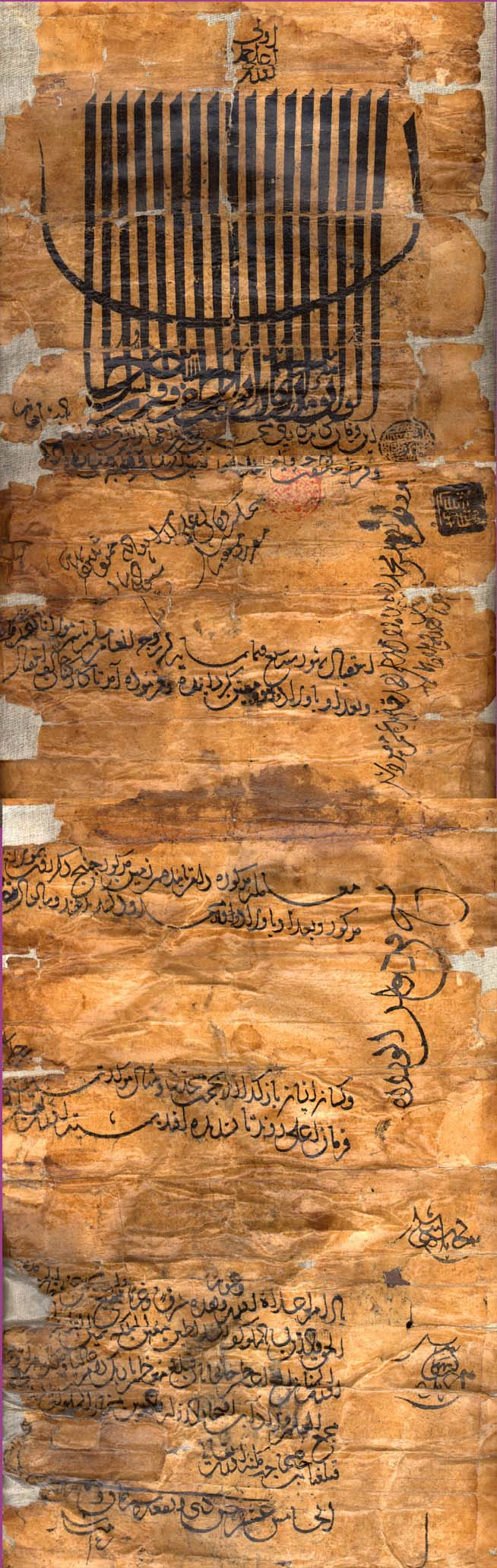
Taj ud-Din Firuz Shah of the Bahmani Sultanate's Firman

The Bahmani dynasty patronized Indo-Muslim and Persian culture from Northern India and the Middle East. However, the society of the Bahmnanis was dominated prominently by Iranians, Afghans, and Turks. They also had considerable and social influence such as with the celebration of Nowruz by Bahmani rulers. This also comes as Mohammed Shah I ascended the throne on Nowruz. According to Khafi Khan and Ferishta, musicians flocked to the court from Lahore, Delhi, Persia, and Khorasan.

The Bahmani sultans were patrons of the Persian language, culture, and literature, and some members of the dynasty became well-versed in the language and composed its literature in the language.

The first sultan, Alauddin Bahman Shah, is noted to have captured 1,000 singing and dancing girls from Hindu temples after he battled the northern Carnatic chieftains. The later Bahmanis also enslaved civilian women and children in wars; many of them were converted to Islam in captivity.

=== Bidriware ===
Bidriware is a metal handicraft from the city of Bidar in Karnataka. It was developed in the 14th century during the rule of the Bahmani Sultans. The term "bidriware" originates from the township of Bidar, which is still the chief center of production. The craftspersons of Bidar were so famed for their inlay work on copper and silver that it came to be known as Bidri. The metal used is white brass that is blackened and inlaid with silver. As a native art form, Bidriware obtained a geographical Indications (GI) registry on 3 January 2006.

=== Architecture ===
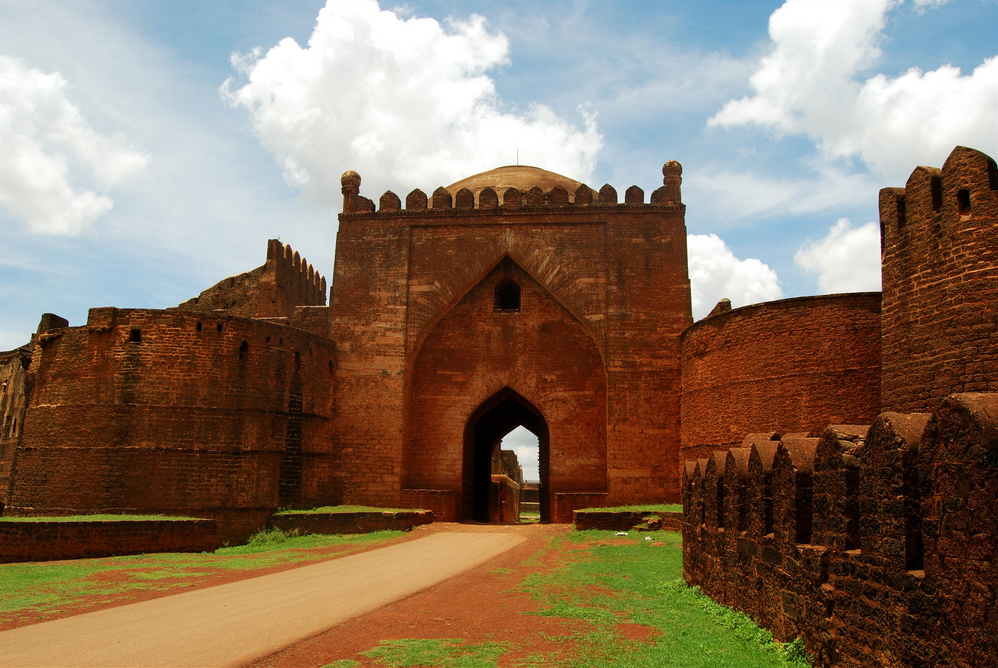
Gateway to Bidar Fort

The Bahmani Sultans patronized many architectural works, although many have since been destroyed. The Gulbarga Fort, Haft Gumbaz, and Jama Masjid in Gulbarga, the Bidar Fort and Madrasa Mahmud Gawan in Bidar, and the Chand Minar in Daulatabad are some of their major architectural contributions.

The later Sultans were buried in a necropolis known as the Bahmani Tombs. The exterior of one of the tombs is decorated with coloured tiles. Arabic, Persian and Urdu inscriptions are inscribed inside the tombs.

The Bahmani Sultans built many mosques, tombs, and madrasas in Bidar and Gulbarga, the two capitals. They also built many forts in Daulatabad, Golconda and Raichur. The architecture was highly influenced by Persian architecture, as they invited architects from Persia, Turkey and Arabia. The Persianate Indo-Islamic style of architecture developed during this period was later adopted by the Deccan Sultanates as well. A Sasanian insignia in the shape of two open wings adorned by a crescent and occasionally a circle is a design found on several early Bahmani constructions in Gulbarga, likely to bolster their claims of Sasanian lineage.

=== Turquoise Throne ===
The Turquoise Throne was a jeweled royal throne mentioned by Firishta. It was the seat of the sultans of the Bahmani Sultanate since Mohammed Shah I (r. 1358–1375). It was a gift of Musunuri Kapaya Nayaka, a Telugu King in post-Kakateeya era. It was mentioned by Firishta that on 23 March 1363, (Note: Firishta mentioned that Sultan Bahman Shah first sat on the new throne (i.e. the Takht-e-Firoza) on Nowruz, the Persian new year, following the autumnal solstice in 764 AH.) this throne replaced an earlier silver throne that the first Bahmani sultan Ala-ud-Din Bahman Shah used.

== Gunpowder weapons ==
The Bahmani Sultanate was likely the first state to invent and utilize gunpowder artillery and firearms within the Indian subcontinent. Their firearms were the most advanced of their time, surpassing even those of the Yuan Dynasty and the Mamluk Sultanate of Egypt. The first recorded use of firearms in South Asia was at the Battle of Adoni in 1368, where the Bahmani Sultanate led by Mohammed Shah I used a train of artillery against the Vijayanagara Empire led by Harihara II. Following the initial use of gunpowder weapons in 1368, they became the backbone of the Bahmani army.

The scholar Iqtidar Alam Khan claims, however, that based on a differing translation of a passage of medieval historian Firishta's text Tarikh-i Firishta, in which he describes early use of gunpowder weapons in the Indian Subcontinent, it can be inferred that both the Delhi Sultanate and non-Muslim Indian states had the gunpowder weapons that the Bahmani Sultanate began to use in 1368, and that the Bahmanis had acquired the weapons from the Delhi Sultanate. Contemporary evidence shows the presence of gunpowder for pyrotechnic uses in the Delhi Sultanate, and Alam Khan states that their usage in the Battle of Adoni in 1368 was rather the first military usage of gunpowder-derived objects in the Subcontinent. According to Klaus Rötzer, these early pyrotechnic weapons were used primarily to frighten enemy cavalry and elephants.

The Bahmani Sultanate used cannons while besieging the Fort of Machal in 1470 or January 1471. This was the first known use of gunpowder in siege weaponry on the Deccan Plateau.

== List of Bahmani rulers ==
Titular Name	Personal Name	Reign
Independence from Sultan of Delhi, Muhammad bin Tughlaq
Shah Ala-ud-Din Bahman Shah	Ala-ud-Din Bahman Shah I	3 August 1347 – 11 February 1358
Shah	Mohammad Shah I	11 February 1358 – 21 April 1375
Shah Ala-ud-Din Mujahid Shah	Mujahid Shah	21 April 1375 – 16 April 1378
Shah	Daud Shah Bahmani	16 April 1378 – 21 May 1378
Shah	Mohammad Shah II	21 May 1378 – 20 April 1397
Shah	Ghiyath-ad-din Shah	20 April 1397 – 14 June 1397
Shah	Shams-ud-Din Shah; Puppet King Under Lachin Khan Turk	14 June 1397 – 15 November 1397
Shah Taj-ud-Din Feroze Shah	Feroze Shah	24 November 1397 – 1 October 1422
Shah	Ahmed Shah Wali Bahmani	1 October 1422 – 17 April 1436
Shah Ala-ud-Din Ahmed Shah	Ala-ud-Din II Ahmed Shah Bahmani	17 April 1436 – 6 May 1458
Shah Ala-ud-Din Humayun Shah	Humayun Shah Zalim Bahmani	7 May 1458 – 4 September 1461
Shah	Nizam Shah Bahmani	4 September 1461 – 30 July 1463
Shah Muhammad Shah Lashkari	Muhammad Shah Bahmani III	30 July 1463 – 26 March 1482
Vira Shah	Mahmood Shah Bahmani II; Puppet under Malik Naib, Qasim Barid I, and Amir Barid I	26 March 1482 – 27 December 1518
Shah	Ahmed Shah Bahmani III; Puppet King Under Amir Barid I	27 December 1518 – 15 December 1520
Shah	Ala-ud-Din Shah Bahmani II; Puppet King Under Amir Barid I	28 December 1520 – 5 March 1522
Shah	Waliullah Shah Bahmani; Puppet King Under Amir Barid I	5 March 1522 – 1526
Shah	Kaleemullah Shah Bahmani; Puppet King Under Amir Barid I	1525–1527
Dissolution of the sultanate into five kingdoms — Bidar, Ahmednagar, Bijapur, Golconda, and Berar

== See also ==
- Battle of Talikota
- Battle of Raichur
- Malwa–Bahmani Wars
