= Alau'd-din Ahmad Shah =

Sultan of the Bahmani Sultanate from 1436 to 1458

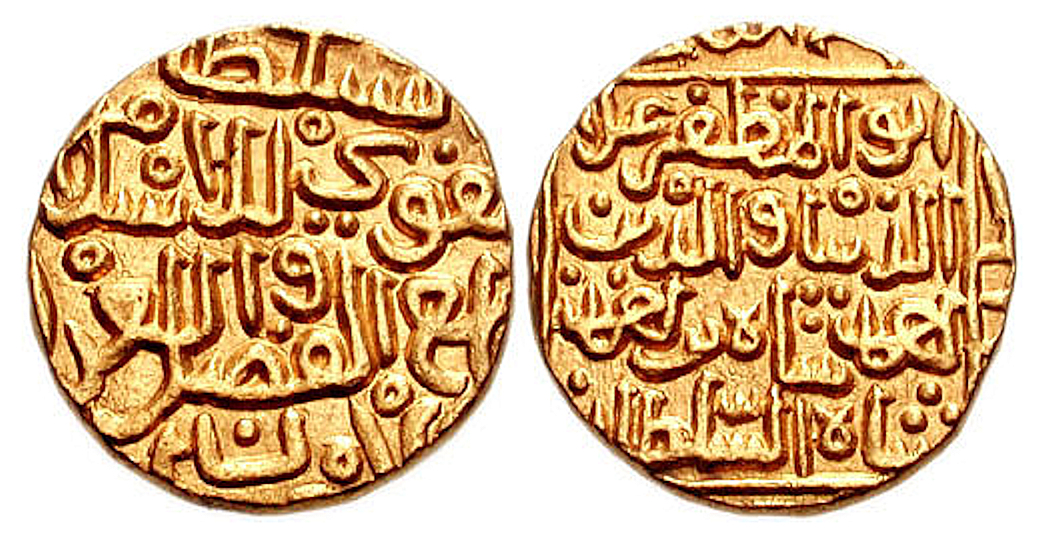

10th Bahmani Sultan
- Reign: 17 April 1436 – 6 May 1458
- Predecessor: Ahmad Shah I Wali
- Successor: Humayun Shah
- Born: ‘Alau’d-din Zafar Khan
- Burial: Bahmani tombs
- Issue: Humayun Shah; Hasan Khan; Yahya Khan; Khunza Humaira; A daughter, married Shah Muhibullah; A daughter, married Shah Quli Sultan
- Father: Ahmad Shah I Wali
- Religion: Islam

Alau’d-din Ahmad Shah was the tenth sultan of the Bahmani Sultanate. He was considered a benevolent ruler, albeit weak in administration. His reign is marked by rebellions.

The rift between the Dakhanis, or old-comers, and Afaqis, or new-comers (Note: The Afaqis are referred to as new-comers rather than foreigners by Sherwani, as the Dakhnis were also of foreign origin. The Dakhni camp also included the Habashis) worsened during his reign.

== Early life ==
Alauddin was the eldest son of Ahmad Shah I Wali.

During his father's reign, Alauddin participated in military campaigns.

== Reign ==
Upon his coronation, he assumed the title of Alauddin Ahmad Shah.

=== Vijayanagara campaign and the rebellion of Muhammad Khan ===
The first major military campaign during Alauddin's reign began against Vijayanagara, over the non-payment of tribute by Deva Raya II. Alauddin deputed his brother Muhammad Khan to demand tribute by force. This venture was successful and Deva Raya sent "eight lacs of huns, twenty elephants and two hundred girls adept in the arts of dance and song".

During his return from Vijayanagara, Muhammad Khan launched a rebellion against the sultan on the premise that according to the will of Ahmad Shah, Alauddin and Muhammad were designated to rule the kingdom jointly. Muhammad Khan captured several forts including Raichur, Mudgal and Solapur.

He fled to the jungle and was pursued by Alauddin's soldiers, who had express orders not to harm the prince. Muhammad was pardoned and awarded the jagir of Rajachal.

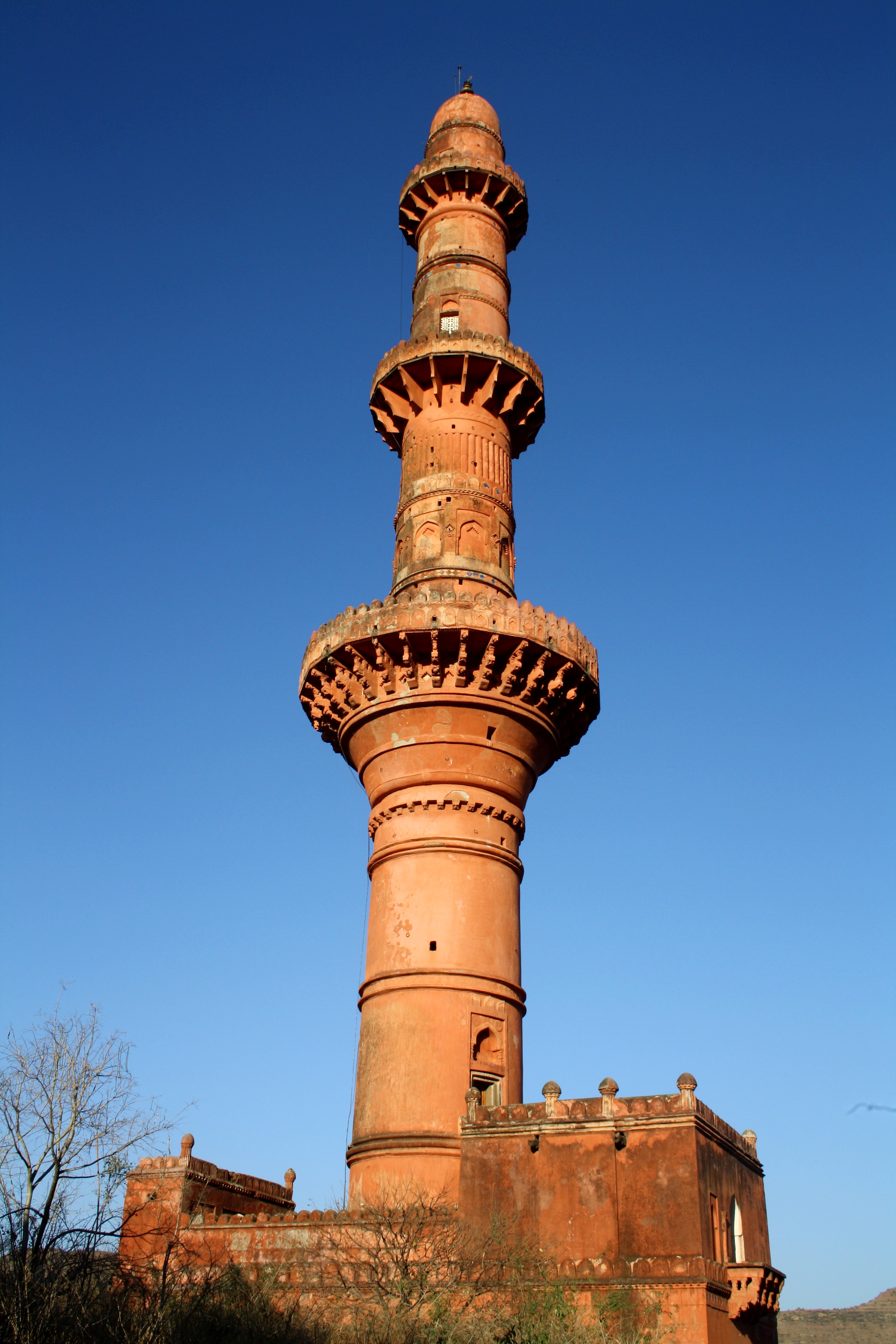
Chand Minar built to commemorate the victory at Daulatabad

=== Second Vijayanagara campaign ===
Alauddin himself commanded the army at Mudgal. A peace treaty was signed and the arrears of tribute were paid in full.

=== Chakan massacre ===
Mushir ul Mulk besieged the Afaqis in the fort of Chakan. He informed the sultan that they had insulted the king. Alauddin ordered the execution of all of them.

They lured the Afaqis into the camp, and massacred practically all of them, including many Sayyids.

The king removed Dakhnis from office, including Prime Minister Mian Minallah.

The massacre further strained Dakhni-Afaqi relations.

=== Rebellion of Jalal Khan ===
In 1455, Jalal Khan, a brother-in-law of Alauddin and the jagirdar of Nalgonda, declared himself king. This was due to a rumour of Alauddin's death as he had been suffering from a wound on his shin. Alauddin marched on Nalgonda, and Jalal's son Sikandar enlisted Mahmud Khalji to join their rebellion. In 1456, Mahmud invaded Berar.

At Mahur, Alauddin commanded a force of 180,000 men. He divided his army into three contingents. Faced with an army thrice the size of his own, Mahmud Khalji withdrew leaving behind a token force of 1000 men.

Mahmud Gawan was put in charge of suppressing the revolt. Jalal was pardoned by the sultan and allowed to retain Nalgonda.

=== Public works and social welfare ===
Alauddin is credited with building a large hospital at Bidar. He endowed several villages, the revenue from which would fund the hospital.

== Death and succession ==
Alauddin died on 6 May 1458, from the malignant wound on his shin. Before his death, he had designated his elder son, Prince Humayun Shah, as his successor. Following Alauddin's death, however, a group of noblemen, including Saif Khan, Mallu Khan, and Shah Habibullah installed Hasan Khan, Humayun's younger brother as king. On learning of the conspiracy, Humayun, assisted by his brother-in-law Shah Muhibullah, swiftly gathered eighty loyal supporters and fought his way into the royal palace. He deposed Hasan, reportedly slapping him in the face, had him and his supporters imprisoned, and subsequently ascended the throne.

== Personality ==
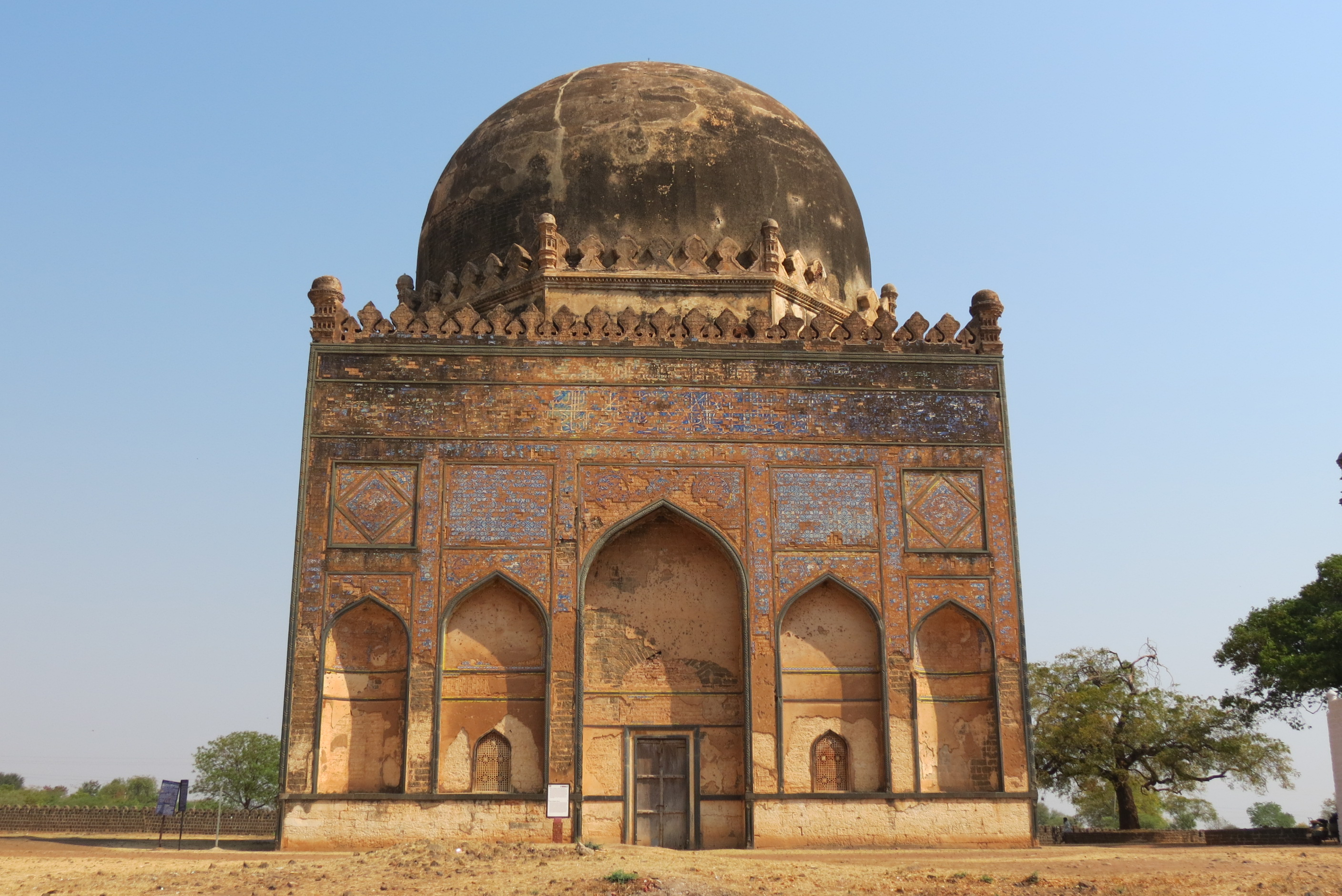
The tomb of Ala-ud-din is embellished with encaustic tiles

Alauddin was described as a benevolent ruler, but weak in administration.

== Family ==
=== Wives ===
- Agha Zainab, daughter of Nasir Shah of Khandesh
- Ziba Chihra, daughter of the Raja of Sangameshwar

=== Issue ===
- Humayun Shah Zalim (the cruel), eleventh Bahmani Sultan
- Hasan Khan. He was killed by his brother Humayun Shah in 1460 by being thrown in front of a tiger.
- Yahya Khan. He was killed by his brother Humayun Shah in 1459.
- Khunza Humaira. Her son, Mirza Adham, married a daughter of Muhammad Shah III Lashkari.
- A daughter, married Shah Muhibullah
- A daughter, married Shah Quli Sultan Changezi

Preceded by Ahmad Shah I Wali	Bahmani Sultan; 1436–1458	Succeeded by Humayun Shah
