= Nizam-Ud-Din Ahmad III =

Sultan of the Bahmani Sultanate from 1461 to 1463

Nizam al-Din Ahmad III

Bahmani Sultan
- Reign: 4 September 1461 – 30 July 1463
- Predecessor: Humayun Shah
- Successor: Muhammad Shah III Lashkari
- Born: c. 1453
- Died: 30 July 1463 (aged 9–10)
- Father: Humayun Shah
- Mother: Makhduma-e-Jahan Nargis Begum
- Religion: Islam

Nizam al-Din Ahmad III (c. 1453 – 30 July 1463), also known as Nizam Ahmed Shah and Nizam Shah Bahmani, was the 12th Sultan of the Bahmani Sultanate from 1461 to 1463. During his reign, the administration of the sultanate was mainly handled by the Persian prime minister Mahmud Gawan.

== Reign ==
Nizam Shah was the eldest son of Humayun Shah and ascended the throne on 4 September 1461 on the death of his father at the age of eight. His father had appointed a council of regents to ensure the smooth running of the kingdom during his son's minority and so the real power was held by his advisor Mahmud Gawan and his wife Makhduma-e-Jahan Nargis Begum as regents. His reign, however, was short and Nizam Shah died on 30 July 1463 and was succeeded by his younger brother Muhammad Shah III Lashkari.

== Gajapati invasion ==
During the initial period in the reign of Nizam, the Gajapati invasion of Berar in 1461 unfolded with the strategic aim of capturing Berar, specifically Achalpur in modern-day Maharashtra. Led by Kapilendra Deva, the Gajapati forces, supported by Kakatiya chiefs, engaged in a significant military campaign. The outcome saw the Bahmani forces, under the leadership of Muhibullah, successfully repelling the Gajapatis, compelling their surrender and the submission of Kapilendra. This event played a crucial role in shaping the dynamics of Nizam Shah Bahmani's rule.

Preceded by Nizam al-Din Ahmad III	Bahmani Shah; 1461–1463	Succeeded by Muhammad Shah III Lashkari
