= Firishta =

Persian court historian

- Born: Muhammad Qasim Hindu Shah Astarabadi c. 1570; Astarabad, Safavid Iran
- Died: 1611–1623
- Occupations: Historian, poet, novelist

Academic work
- Era: Medieval Islamic period
- Main interests: Indo-Muslim history, Deccan history
- Notable works: Tārīkh-i Firishta (Gulshan-i Ibrāhīmī)

Firishta or Ferešte (Persian: فرشته), full name Muhammad Qasim Hindu Shah Astarabadi (Note: Transliterated as Moḥammad-Qāsem Hendušāh Astarābādī according to the Encyclopædia Iranica scheme (2012).) (Persian: محمدقاسم هندوشاہ استرابادی), was a Persian historian, who later settled in India and served the Deccan Sultans as their court historian. He was born in 1570 and died between 1611 and 1623.

== Life ==
Firishta was born c. 1570 at Astarabad on the shores of the Caspian Sea to Gholam Ali Hindu Shah. While Firishta was still a child, his father was summoned away from his native country to Ahmednagar, India, to teach Persian to the young prince Miran Husain Nizam Shah, with whom Firishta studied.

In 1587 Firishta was serving as the captain of guards of King Murtaza Nizam Shah I when Prince Miran overthrew his father and claimed the throne of Ahmednagar. At this time, the Sunni Deccani Muslims committed a general massacre of the foreign population, especially Shias of Iranian origin, of which Firishta was one of. However, Prince Miran spared the life of his former friend, who then left for Bijapur to enter the service of King Ibrahim Adil II in 1589.

Having been in military positions until then, Firishta was not immediately successful in Bijapur. Further exacerbating matters was that Firishta was of Shia origin and therefore did not have much chance of attaining a high position in the dominantly Sunni courts of the Deccan sultanates. Ibrahim Adil Shah II of Bijapur had also begun following the policy of bringing Sunni Muslim Deccanis to power and ending Shia domination by dismissing them from their posts. In 1593 Ibrahim Shah II ultimately implored Firishta to write a history of India with equal emphasis on the history of Deccan dynasties as no work thus far had given equal treatment to all regions of the subcontinent.

== Overview of work ==
The work was variously known as the Tārīkh-i Firishta (The History of Firishta) and the Gulshan-i Ibrāhīmī (The Rose-Garden of Ibrahim [Shah II]). In the introduction, a resume of the history of Hindustan prior to the times of the Muslim conquest is given, and also the victorious progress of Arabs through the East. The first ten books are each occupied with a history of the kings of one of the provinces; the eleventh book gives an account of the Muslims of Malabar; the twelfth a history of the Muslim saints of India; and the conclusion treats of the geography and climate of India.

Tārīkh-i Firishta consists primarily of the following chapter's (maqāla), with some, like "The Kings of Dakhin" having subchapters (rawza):

1. The Kings of Ghazni and Lahore
2. The Kings of Dehli
3. The Kings of Dakhin – divided into 6 chapters:
  1. Gulbarga
  2. Bijapur
  3. Ahmadnagar
  4. Tilanga
  5. Birar
  6. Bidar
4. The Kings of Gujarat
5. The Kings of Malwa
6. The Kings of Khandesh
7. The Kings of Bengal and Bihar
8. The Kings of Multan
9. The Rulers of Sind
10. The Kings of Kashmir
11. An account of Malabar
12. An account of Saints of India
13. Conclusion – an account of the climate and geography of India (khātima)

He called Nagarkot as "Bhimkot".

Contemporary scholars and historians variously write that the works of Firishta drew from Tabaqāt-i-Akbarī by Nizamuddin, Tarīkh-i-Rāshidī by Mirza Haidar and Barani's Tārīkh. At least one historian, Peter Jackson, explicitly states that Firishta relied upon the works of Barani and Sarhindi, and that his work cannot be relied upon as a first hand account of events, and that at places in the Tarīkh he is suspected of having relied upon legends and his own imagination.

== Legacy ==
According to T. N. Devare, Firishta's account is the most widely quoted history of the Adil Shahi, but it is the only source for asserting the Ottoman origin of Yusuf Adil Shah, the founder of the Adil Shahi dynasty. Devare believes that to be a fabricated story. Other sources for Deccani history mentioned by Devare are those of Mir Rafiuddin Ibrahim-i Shirazi, or "Rafi'", Mir Ibrahim Lari-e Asadkhani, and Ibrahim Zubayri, the author of the Basatin as-Salatin (67, fn 2). Devare observed that the work is "a general history of India from the earliest period up to Firishta's time written at the behest of Ibrahim Adil Shah II and presented to him in 1015 AH/1606 CE. It seems, however, that it was supplemented by the author himself as it records events up to AH 1033 (1626 CE)" (Devare 272).

On the other hand, Tārīkh-i Firishta is said to be independent and reliable on the topic of north Indian politics of the period, ostensibly that of Emperor Jahangir where Firishta's accounts are held credible because of his affiliation with the south Indian kingdom of Bijapur.

Despite his fabricated story of Yusuf's Ottoman origin, Firishta's account continues to be a popular story and has found wide acceptance in Bijapur today.

In 1768, when the East India Company officer and Orientalist Alexander Dow translated Firishta's text into English language, it came to be seen as an authoritative source of historical information by the English.

Firishta's work still maintains a high place and is considered reliable in many respects. Several portions of it have been translated into English; but the best as well as the most complete translation is that published by General J. Briggs under the title of The History of the Rise of the Mahomedan Power in India (London, 1829, 4 vols. 8vo). Several additions were made by Briggs to the original work of Firishta, but he omitted the whole of the twelfth book, and various other passages which had been omitted in the copy from which he translated.

== Works ==
- Firishta, Muhammad Qasim Hindu Shah Astarabadi (1794). Ferishta's History of Dekkan..(Vol. 1). Translated by Jonathan Scott. John Stocksdale, London.
- Firishta, Muhammad Qasim Hindu Shah Astarabadi (1794). Ferishta's History of Dekkan..(Vol. 2). Translated by Jonathan Scott. John Stocksdale, London.

== See also ==
- List of Muslim historians
