= Malwa–Bahmani Wars =

1425–1466 conflicts between the Bahamani Sultanate and the Malwa Sultanate

| Date | 1425–1466 |
| Location | Madhya Pradesh, Maharashtra |
| Result | Peace Treaty § Aftermath |
| Territorial changes | Malwa Sultanate secures control over Kherla; Ellichpur fixed as the boundary between Malwa Sultanate and Bahmani Sultanate |

Belligerents
| Malwa Sultanate | Bahmani Sultanate; Kherla kingdom Supported by: Gujarat Sultanate |

Commanders and leaders
| Hoshang Shah; Mahmud Khalji; Ghiyas-ud-Din Shah (WIA); Narsingh Rai; Maqbul Khan; Mahabat Khan †; Zahir-ul-Mulk †; Taj Khan; Sher Khan; Khawas Khan; Yaqan Khan; Mubarak Khan; Qiwam Khan; Mukhtas Khan; Yusuf Khan; Malik Firuz; Nusrat Khan; Nizam-ul-Mulk Ghori; Siraj-ul-Mulk (POW); Ghazi Khan; Rai Siv Das | Ahmad Shah I Wali; Alau'd-din Ahmad Shah; Nizam-Ud-Din Ahmad III; Muhammad Shah III Lashkari; Mahmud Gawan; Narsingh Rai; Abdul Qadir; Abdullah; Qasim Beg; Sikandar Khan; Nizam-ul-Mulk; Khwaja-i Jahan Turk; Mallu Khan Deccani; Malik Mahmud Parvez (surrendered); Malik Yusuf Turk X Adil Khan; Darya Khan; Wafa Khan; Qazi Khan; Pir Khan; Farkhunda Khan; Hasan Khan Mahmud Begada |

Strength
| 1429: 30,000; 1453: 50,000: 1462: Maheskar: 40,000 cavalry 60 elephants; Bidar: Unknown; Daulatabad: 90,000 cavalry | 1429: 15,000; 1453: 180,000: 1462: Maheskar: 31,000 cavalry 240 elephants; Bidar: 40,000; 1465: 20,000; 1466: 1,500 cavalry Gujarat Sultanate: 1462: 80,000 cavalry |

Casualties and losses
| 1429: 2000 killed 1466: 5,000 killed 23 elephants captured | 1462: 107 elephants captured 1666: 20 nobles killed 30 nobles captured 20 horses captured |

The Malwa–Bahmani Wars were a series of military campaigns fought in the 15th century between the Bahmani Sultanate of the Deccan and the Malwa Sultanate of central India. The conflicts cantered on control of Kherla and Berar lasted from 1425 until 1466. The conflicts were influenced by the neighbouring states. Khandesh Sultanate acted as Malwa vassal, while the Gujarat Sultanate provided military support to the Bahmanis against Malwa.

The conflicts began in 1399–1400 when Narsingh Rai of Kherla, backed by the rulers of Malwa and Khandesh, invaded Bahmani territory in Berar. Bahmani Sultan Taj ud-Din Firuz Shah repelled the invasion and forced Narsingh Rai into vassalage. Over the following decades, the rulers of Kherla frequently shifted allegiances between the two powers. Key escalations occurred under Hoshang Shah of Malwa and Ahmad Shah Wali of the Bahmanis. The Bahmani initially gained victory at the battle of Kherla (1429) but this was reversed after Hoshang Shah's conquest of Kherla in 1433, during which Narsingh Rai was killed. Later, Mahmud Khalji of Malwa sought to extend his authority over Berar and Telangana, then part of the Bahmani Sultanate. He launched three campaigns into the Deccan. The first, in 1453, was an unsuccessful siege of Berar. In the second, he defeated the Bahmanis at the Battle of Maheskar (1462) and laid siege to Bidar, but was forced to withdraw due to Mahmud Begada of Gujarat's interference. On the third occasion, he successfully besieged Daulatabad (1462), though again compelled to retreat upon the arrival of Gujarati forces. After repeated raids along the Berar frontier and the fruitless war over Kherla (1466), both sides sued for peace. Prolonged and inconclusive warfare led to a treaty that fixed Ellichpur as the boundary between the two sultanates. Malwa retained Mahmudabad (Kherla), while Berar remained under Bahmani control.

== Background ==
In 1399–1400, Narsingh Rai encouraged by the rulers of Malwa and Khandesh, took advantage of turmoil within the Bahmani kingdom and advanced into Berar. He occupied territory as far as Mahur. At the time, Taj ud-Din Firuz Shah (r. 1397–1422) was preparing for a campaign against Vijayanagar. Therefore, he dispatched the Daulatabad division to check Narsingh Rai's invasion. After Vijayanagar campaign, Firuz Shah turned northward and reoccupied Mahur. From there he moved towards Kherla. Afraid of Bahmani attack, Narsingh Rai asked help from Malwa and Khandesh rulers, but they refused. So, he gathered his men near Kherla and waited for Firuz Shah's army. Bahmani army killed many in the ensuing battle and captured Narsingh's son Gopal Rai. Narsingh Rai ran to Kherla fort but was besieged. After two months he capitulated, went to Firuz Shah's camp, accepted him as overlord, gave his daughter in marriage. Firuz Shah forgave him, gave him honour, and allowed him to rule Kherla as Bahmani vassal. In 1420, after a period of relief from Ahmad Shah's attacks, Hoshang Shah marched to Kherla to seize Narsingh Rai’s territories and wealth. Narsingh Rai confronted him outside the fort with 50,000 soldiers but was defeated. He submitted to Hoshang Shah, accepting him as overlord and handing over 84 elephants and a large amount of gold. This victory strengthened Hoshang Shah's army and replenished his treasury, which had been depleted by wars with Gujarat. However, he did not capture the fort and allowed Narsingh Rai to continue ruling Kherla as his vassal. Kherla became a contested territory between the Malwa Sultanate and the Bahmani kingdom. Narsingh Rai maintained relations with both Hoshang Shah and Ahmad Shah Bahmani, exploiting their rivalry to his advantage. Sultan Sultan Ahmad Shah Wali, driven by ambition wanted to conquer Khandesh, Malwa, and Gujarat claiming Timur had granted them to his brother Firuz Shah. He also sought to strengthen his position in Berar and Gondwana. In 1426–27, he invaded and finally annexed Mahur after three campaigns. Additionally, Firishta mentions that during this time, the Sultan seized the fort of Kalan or Kullum and a diamond mine which had previously belonged to the ruler of Gondwana. The removal of the Rai of Mahur is confirmed in the writings of Nizam-ud-Din, who states that the territory of Mahur was bestowed upon Shahzada Mahmud Khan. He also restored the old fort of Gawilgarh and spent a year at Ellichpur. This aggressive expansionist policy pursued by Sultan Ahmad Bahmani caused concern for Hoshang Shah.

== Malwa conquest of Kherla ==
=== Siege of Kherla (1425) ===
Hoshang Shah promptly took action to assess the situation. In 1425 he invaded Kherla. Kherla had pledged allegiance to Ahmad Shah Bahmani in order to protect its territories from destruction. The initial expedition led by Hoshang Shah did not yield any significant outcome.

=== Battle of Kherla (1429) ===
In 1428–29, Hoshang Shah of Malwa decided to personally lead a campaign to subdue Kherla. Narsingh Rai, caught between the two powers sought protection from the Bahmani Sultan Ahmad Shah Wali. Ahmad Shah responded by ordering Abdul Qadir, the governor of Berar, to collect troops and rush to Narsingh's aid. The Sultan himself marched with 6,000 to 7,000 cavalry towards Ellichpur and then on to Kherla in 1429 CE. Meanwhile, under pressure from both sides, Narsingh attempted to appease Hoshang Shah by promising him one lakh tankas for every day's march towards Kherla. Hoshang responded swiftly, advancing on Kherla with a large army of 30,000 troops. Bahmani army had 15,000 troops under their possession. Upon learning of the Malwa army's approach and realising he was outnumbered, Ahmad Shah retreated into Bahmani territory. He proposed through a message that both sides withdraw to avoid unnecessary bloodshed between fellow Muslims, but without waiting for a reply, he broke camp and withdrew. Hoshang Shah pursued the Bahmanis and pitched his tents on the very spot vacated by Ahmad Shah. At this critical juncture, Ahmad Shah justified his earlier retreat to his officers and prepared for battle. He placed the right wing under Abdul Qadir, the left under Abdullah the grandson of Ismail Mukh, and the centre under his son, prince Alauddin. The Sultan himself commanded the reserve. Despite being outnumbered, the Bahmani forces were well-positioned. The two armies clashed in a fierce engagement. Hoshang had only 17,000 soldiers present in the battlefield. The engagements lasted the entire day. Both sides suffered massive casualties. In the afternoon, Ahmad Shah marched with his reserve force of 10,000 picked cavalry and 12 elephants. This decisive charge broke the Malwa army. As night fell, Hoshang Shah's forces were completely routed. As Hoshang retreated, Rai Narsingh seized the opportunity to attack the disordered Malwa army, inflicting further damage. Around 2,000 of his soldiers were killed. Hoshang himself fled back towards Malwa. Ahmad Shah Wali captured his elephants and harem, including two of his daughters. He returned them safely.

=== Hoshang Shah's conquest of Kherla (1433) ===
After Hoshang Shah's defeat by Ahmad Shah Bahmani, Narsingh Rai switched allegiance to the Bahmani Kingdom. From 1429–30 onwards, Ahmad Shah was in war with the Gujarat Sultanate. In 1433, Hoshang Shah taking the opportunity invaded Kherla, killed Narsingh Rai in battle, and annexed the territory. Narsingh's son, Kosal Rai, submitted and was allowed to rule Kherla as a feudatory of Malwa. Ahmad Shah promptly marched against Hoshang Shah. However, Nasir Khan of Khandesh intervened and persuaded both sultans end hostilities. After negotiations, Kherla was left with Hoshang Shah, while the province of Berar remained with the Bahmanis, thus establishing a clear boundary between the two kingdoms.

== Malwa invasion of Deccan ==
=== First invasion ===
==== Siege of Berar (1453) ====
During the reign of Alau'd-din Ahmad Shah, the Bahmani kingdom was suffering from internal power struggle. Mahmud Khalji had been observing the situation, hoping to exploit it. Alau'd-din Ahmad Shah's brother-in-law Jalal Khan and his son Sikandar Khan revolted in Nalgonda. While Jalal Khan defended the fort, Sikandar Khan fled to Mahur and appealed to Mahmud, falsely claiming that Sultan Alau'd-din Ahmad was dead and the kingdom was collapsing. He urged Mahmud to invade quickly, promising that Berar and Telingana would fall easily into his hands. In January–February 1453, Mahmud Khalji tried to invade Berar and Telangana by starting from Hoshangabad for Mahur via Kherla. He now allied himself with Mubarak Khan of Khandesh, crossed the frontier, and marched to Mahur where he joined hands with Sikandar. When Alau'd-din Ahmad Shah heard about the invasion from the north, he quickly left Nalgonda and marched toward Mahur with a massive army of 180,000 men. He divided his forces into three parts: one under Malik-ut-Tujjar Qasim Beg facing the main Malwa army, another consisting of Berar levies facing Mubarak Khan of Khandesh, while he himself stayed in the centre with the Bijapur forces. Sultan Mahmud had marched with only 50,000 troops, believing the false report that Ahmad II was dead. But when he saw the huge opposing army and realised the Sultan was very much alive, he knew a battle would be disastrous. So, he decided not to fight. However, Mahmud didn't want Sikandar Khan to slip away and rejoin the Bahmanis. He ordered a retreat but left a thousand men behind to protect Sikandar, but actually to keep him under watch. After Mahmud withdrew, Sikandar eventually managed to escape and went back to Sultan Ahmad, begging for pardon. In the end, Mahmud's 1453 campaign achieved nothing.

=== Second invasion ===
==== Battle of Maheskar (1462) ====
After the accession of Nizam-Ud-Din Ahmad III, Mahmud Khalji again sought to capture Ellichpur. On 25 October 1461, he marched towards Khandesh, crossing the Narmada River. Adil Khan (r. 1457–1501) of Khandesh quickly submitted. Mahmud advanced into the Deccan and reached Balapur, where he learned of the approaching Bahmani army. The Bahmani forced led by the young sultan Nizam-Ud-Din Ahmad and accompanied by Mahmud Gawan, Khwaja-i Jahan Turk, and Sikandar Khan, with the Bijapur, Daulatabad, and Berar divisions. Mahmud Khalji divided his army into three contingents. He positioned himself at the centre with 60 elephants and 30,000 cavalry. The right wing was placed under Sher Khan, with 30 elephants and 10,000 cavalry, while the left wing was commanded by Khan-i-Azam Taj Khan. The advance guard was also divided into three parts: a centre and two wings. In the center, he stationed 20 elephants and several thousand soldiers. The right wing of the advance guard was led by officers including Khawas Khan, Yaqan Khan, Mubarak Khan, and Qiwam Khan. The left wing was commanded by officers such as Mukhtas Khan, Yusuf Khan, Malik Firuz, Nusrat Khan, and several others. On 12 February 1462, the Malwa army reached Maheskar near the Manjra River, exhausted after the long march. Mahmud planned to rest his army and start the battle the next day, but the Bahmanis launched an immediate attack. The Bahmani army had 31,000 troops and 240 elephants in total. The boy-king Nizam Shah positioned in the centre, accompanied by Khwaja-i Jahan Turk and Sikandar Khan. He was directly opposed by Mahmud Khalji's division. The right wing was held by Nizam-ul-Mulk Turk while the left was under Mahmud Gawan. Khwaja-i Jahan faced Mahabat Khan of Chanderi and Zahir-ul-Mulk, while Nizam-ul-Mulk Turk confronted his namesake Nizam-ul-Mulk Ghori and Crown prince Ghiyath Shah. In the ensuing battle, Mahmud Gawan's charge killed Mahabat Khan and Zahir-ul-Mulk, while Ghiyath Shah was wounded. Mahmud Khalji personally led charge to the enemy lines. When the Bahmanis unleashed 50 war elephants, but the Malwa archers fired concentrated volleys that turned the elephants back. It caused them to stampede into their own lines and created chaos. Alarmed for the boy-sultan's safety, Sikandar Khan left the battlefield carrying him to Bidar. The resulting confusion broke Bahmani morale. Mahmud exploited the disorder, routed the enemy, and pursued them toward Bidar. The Malwa forces captured 107 elephants and significant booty. Suspecting a trap, Mahmud remained still for three days.

==== Siege of Bidar (1462) ====
Mahmud Khalji advanced to Bidar and besieged the citadel. Other detachments captured Berar, Bir, and Daulatabad. The Dowager Queen, with Mahmud Gawan, sent the boy-king Nizam-ud-Din Ahmad to safety at Firozabad. Mallu Khan Deccani was left in charge for Bidar's defence. She urgently sought help from Mahmud Begada of Gujarat against the besieging army. Mahmud Begada promptly marched with 80,000 cavalry to Sultanpur in Nandurbar district. Boosted by this support, Mahmud Gawan advanced from Bir with 6,000 troops and received reinforcements of 20,000 Gujarati soldiers. Khwaja-i Jahan was also dispatched towards Bidar. Mahmud Gawan after mobilising more men marched towards Bidar with 40,000 troops. Finding himself surrounded from three sides, Mahmud Khalji withdrew immediately. With main routes blocked, he retreated through the harsh terrain of Berar via Kalyani. Around 5,000–6,000 of his troops died from heat and dehydration, while the survivors were plundered by the Gonds.

=== Third invasion ===
==== Siege of Daulatabad (1462) ====
After resting in Mandu, Mahmud Khalji again marched with 90,000 cavalries to conquer Berar on 19 December 1462. As Mahmud reached the Khandesh frontier, Adil Khan of Khandesh, sent Shaikh Da'ud with a petition declaring himself Mahmud's dependent and begging that his country be spared. Reassured, Mahmud advanced to the Purna river, camped at Tandar village, and then marched straight to Daulatabad. Malik Parvez Sultan, the governor burned the city before retreating into the hill fort of Daulatabad. Sultan Mahmud besieged the fort but found it difficult to capture. He tried to lure Malik Parvez to defect. Malik Parvez initially refused. The siege intensified which prompted him to eventually submit in exchange of his life being spared. Mahmud accepted his submission, lifted the siege, entered the fort personally to inspect the buildings, and then withdrew.

From Daulatabad, Mahmud marched towards Ellichpur. Nizam-Ud-Din Ahmad already sought Mahmud Begada's help. In April 1463, Mahmud Khalji learnt that Mahmud Begada had arrived at Sultanpur and Nandarbar to help the Bahmanis, he immediately withdrew. The Gujarati forces blocked the Khandesh route. Thus he marched through Berar. There he raided some villages near Balkonda fort, and returned via Gondwana. He reached Mandu on 10 May 1463 AD.

== Bahmani invasion of Kherla ==
After three unsuccessful attempts into Deccan, Mahmud Khalji focused on raiding in Berar. Mahmud detached Sher Khan to sack Kalam, while he himself raided the Ellichpur countryside, defeated its army, and returned to his capital with Sher Khan also bringing prisoners. Mahmud turned his attention to refractory local chiefs. Kherla was held by the descendants of Narsingh Rai. He removed Harnaik Zuanardar appointing Siraj-ul-mulk as its governor. He also strengthened its fortifications and renamed it Mahmudabad. Mahmudabad was turned into a forward base for raids against Ellichpur. Next, he invaded Bairagrah inhabited by the Gonds, driving its Rai out. These moves by Sultan Mahmud alarmed the Bahmani Sultan, who sent a 20,000-strong force to reinforce his Malwa border. Mahmud left Mandu on 14 November 1465 and reached Nalcha. Meanwhile, Muhammad Shah III Lashkari ordered Malik Yusuf Turk surnamed Nizam-ul-Mulk Turk to attack and destroy Kherla. Upon receiving this news at Nalcha, Mahmud immediately summoned his forces. He appointed Taj Khan to lead the moving army.

=== Siege of Kherla (1466) ===
Siraj-ul-Mulk the governor of Mahmudabad Kherla neglected military preparedness and succumbed to heavy indulgence in wine. Nizam-ul-Mulk hearing the news of Mahmud Khalji's illness attacked Kherla in 1466 AD. Siraj-ul-Mulk's son came out to fight but was ultimately killed. According to Mahmud Gawan, Siraj‑ul‑Mulk was defeated in the first attack, with about five thousand infantry and cavalry in casualties. Siraj-ul-Mulk along with twenty‑three elephants were captured. Nizam-ul-Mulk occupied Mahmudabad Kherla. He neglected his personal safety and one of his soldiers killed him, in revenge. Nizam-ul-Mulk's adopted sons, Adil Khan and Darya Khan established garrison in the fort and shifted the body to Bidar. Despite his illness Mahmud immediately set out in a palki and ordered Taj Khan to capture Kherla. Taj Khan easily drove the Bahmanis out and reoccupied Mahmudabad Kherla. Mahmud then placed the fort under Maqbul Khan granted him 50 horses, 15 elephants to strengthen this key outpost.

=== Battle of Ellichpur (1466) ===
Ghazi Khan dispatched by Maqbul Khan from Kherla raided Ellichpur. In the meantime, Mahmud Gawan wanted to punish Malik Parvez, the Bahmani governor of Daulatabad because of his previous submission to Mahmud Khalji in 1462–63. Mahmud Khalji received a petition from Malik Mahmud Parvez, seeking military help against Mahmud Gawan. Mahmud decided to assist and marched towards Daulatabad. Mahmud Khalji at Mandu received word from Maqbul Khan that the Bahmanis were planning to attack Kherla. He decided to launch an immediate counter-campaign. In November 1466, Maqbul Khan, along with Mansur-ul-Mulk and Rai Shiv Das invaded Elichpur. They ravaged the countryside at Radpur and Taluda collecting massive booty of 12,000 cattle, 4,000 slaves, and other goods. Maqbul Khan divided his forces into three divisions and launched a multi-sided attack on Elichpur causing heavy damages. Wafa Khan, the governor of Elichpur, assembled 1,500 cavalry and a large body of infantry. He and other officers including Qazi Khan, Pir Khan, Farkhunda Khan, and Hasan Khan planned a night attack on Maqbul Khan's booty-laden returning army. Maqbul Khan, however, received timely intelligence of the plan. Considering his heavy baggage and the difficult terrain, he divided his forces. He sent one detachment to guard the booty, kept the best troops under his personal command, and dispatched the rest to meet the enemy. When Wafa Khan launched his night attack, Mansur-ul-Mulk and Rai Siv Das struck from one side while Maqbul Khan attacked from the other. The Bahmani forces were completely routed and chased back to the gates of Elichpur. Twenty Bahmani officers were killed while thirty notables, Wafa Khan's sword, standard (chatra) along with more than twenty horses were captured. Maqbul Khan being victorious returned to Mahmudabad.

== Aftermath ==
After a prolonged series of wars, both parties found themselves exhausted of the inconclusive fighting. Sultan Mahmud visited Sufi saint Shaikh Zia-ud-din Biyabani, who criticised the destructive policy and urged peace between the Muslim states. Shaikh Zia-ud-din adviced Mahmud that it would be better to adopt policies that benefit the Muslim community rather than continuing destructive campaigns against other Muslim territories. He sent Qazi Shaikhan Mulitasib to Bidar to formulate negotiation. The agreement reached between both parties ultimately established Ellichpur as the designated boundary between their respective kingdoms. Thus, Mahmud's attempts to annex of Berar was unsuccessful. He only managed to secure the territory of Mahmudabad Kherla. The treaty fostered good relations between the two powers and lasted till the fall of the Bahmani kingdom.

== Table of conflicts ==
| Conflict (Year) | Combatants | | Outcome |
|---|---|---|---|
| Siege of Kherla (1425) | Malwa Sultanate; Hoshang Shah | Bahmani Sultanate; Ahmad Shah I Wali | Indecisive |
| Siege of Kherla (1429) | Malwa Sultanate; Hoshang Shah | Bahmani Sultanate; Ahmad Shah I Wali | Bahmani victory |
| Siege of Berar (1453) | Malwa Sultanate; Mahmud Khalji | Bahmani Sultanate | Bahmani victory |
| Battle of Maheskar (1462) | Malwa Sultanate; Mahmud Khalji | Bahmani Sultanate; Nizam-Ud-Din Ahmad III | Malwa victory |
| Siege of Bidar (1462) | Malwa Sultanate; Mahmud Khalji | Bahmani Sultanate; Mallu Khan Deccani; Mahmud Gawan; Khan-i Jahan; Gujarat Sultanate; Mahmud Begada | Bahmani victory |
| Siege of Daulatabad (1463) | Malwa Sultanate; Mahmud Khalji | Bahmani Sultanate; Malik Mahmud Parvez | Malwa victory |
| Siege of Kherla (1466) | Malwa Sultanate; Taj Khan | Bahmani Sultanate; Nizam-ul-Mulk | Bahmani victory |
| Siege of Kherla (1466) | Malwa Sultanate; Mahmud Khalji | Bahmani Sultanate | Malwa victory |
| Battle of Ellichpur (1466) | Malwa Sultanate; Maqbul Khan; Rai Shiv Das | Bahmani Sultanate; Wafa Khan | Malwa victory |

== See also ==
- Bahmani-Vijayanagar War
- Bahmani invasion of Orissa
- Hoshang Shah's invasion of Orissa
- Muzaffar Shah's invasion of Malwa

== Bibliography ==
- Jaques, Tony (2006-11-30). Dictionary of Battles and Sieges: A Guide to 8,500 Battles from Antiquity through the Twenty-first Century [3 volumes]. Bloomsbury Publishing USA. ISBN 978-0-313-02799-4.
- Day, Upendra Nath (1965). Medieval Malwa: A Political and Cultural History, 1401-1562. Munshi Ram Manohar Lal. ISBN 978-81-215-0401-0.
- Sherwani, Haroon Khan (1946). The Bahmanis of The Deccan.
- Shrivastav, P. N. (1971). Gazetteer of India Madhya Pradesh: Betul. Bhopal, Madhya Pradesh: Government Central Press.
- Habib, Mohammad; Nizami, Khaliq Ahmad, eds. (1970). A Comprehensive History of India: The Delhi Sultanat (A.D. 1206-1526). Vol. V. People's Publishing House.
- Haig, W. (1928). The Cambridge History of India: Turks and Afghans, edited by W. Haig. Vol. III. Cambridge University Press.
- Yazdani, Ghulam (1917). The Antiquities of Bidar. Printed at the Baptist mission Press.
