= Hoshang Shah's conquest of Kherla =

Malwa Sultanate's conquest of Kherla Kingdom

- Part of Malwa–Bahmani Wars
Date	1420–1433
Location	Betul district, Madhya Pradesh
Result	Malwa Sultanate victory: Fall of Kherla kingdom
Territorial changes	Territories of Kherla kingdom annexed to Malwa Sultanate

Belligerents
Malwa Sultanate	Kherla kingdom	Bahmani Sultanate

Commanders and leaders
Hoshang Shah	Narsingh Rai †	Taj ud-Din Firuz Shah; Ahmad Shah I Wali; Abdul Qadir

Strength
30,000	50,000	10,000 cavalry 12 elephants

Casualties and losses
2,000 killed	Unknown	Unknown

Hoshang Shah's conquest of Kherla (1420–1433) was a series of campaigns by the Malwa Sultanate against the Gond kingdom of Kherla under Narsingh Rai. Initially marked by shifting alliances and tribute payments to both Malwa and the Bahmani Sultanate, the conflict culminated in Hoshang Shah's victory in 1433. The death of Narsingh Rai resulted the incorporation of Kherla and its dependent territories, including Betul, into the Malwa Sultanate.

== Background ==
In 1398, Narsingh Rai was ruling over Kherla kingdom. Considered the first Gond king of Kherla, he succeeded Jaitpal. Kherla was once a powerful kingdom, extending its rule over Nimar and forcing the Chauhans to retreat to Piplauda. In 1398, Narsingh Rai encouraged by the rulers of Malwa and Khandesh, took advantage of turmoil within the Bahmani kingdom and advanced into Berar. He captured territory as far as Mahur. At the time, Taj ud-Din Firuz Shah was preparing for a campaign against Vijayanagar. Therefore, he dispatched the Daulatabad division to check Narsingh Rai's invasion. After Vijayanagar campaign, Firuz Shah advanced to Mahur, recapturing the region. From Mahur he moved towards Kherla. Afraid of Bahmani attack, Narsingh Rai asked help from Malwa and Khandesh rulers, but they refused. So, he gathered his men near Kherla and waited for Firuz Shah's army. Bahmani army killed many in the ensuing battle, and captured Narsingh's son Gopal Rai. Narsingh Rai ran to Kherla fort but was besieged. After two months he gave up, went to Firuz Shah's camp, accepted him as overlord, gave his daughter in marriage. Firuz Shah forgave him, gave him honour, and allowed him to rule Kherla as Bahmani vassal. Kherla had been under Bahmani rule for twenty years, but Hoshang Shah of Malwa turned his attention there after suffering repeated defeats against the Gujarat Sultanate. To overcome his army's weakness, he wanted to acquire elephants and choose Kherla and Jajnagar to source them. Thus, he decided to lead campaign against Kherla.

== Conflicts ==
In 1420, after some relief from Ahmad Shah's attacks, Hoshang Shah went to Kherla to capture Narsingh Rai's territories and wealth. Narsingh Rai came out of the fort with 50,000 soldiers but lost the battle. He accepted Hoshang Shah as overlord and gave 84 elephants and much gold. This made Hoshang Shah's army stronger and filled his treasury, which was weak from wars with Gujarat. However, Hoshang Shah did not take the fort and let Narsingh Rai keep it under his rule. In 1423, while returning from Jajnagar, Hoshang Shah learnt that Ahmad Shah had attacked Malwa and besieged Mandu. Hoshang was near Kherla then, so he wanted to use the fort as second shelter. He called Narsingh Rai with his army but tricked him, kept him in confinement, and put his own garrison in the fort. Later, when Ahmad Shah left Malwa, Hoshang gave back Kherla to Narsingh Rai, who became his ally and sent his sons Chandji and Khemji to aid the Gagron campaign. Kherla became a disputed land between Malwa and Bahmani, where Narsingh Rai tried to balance both sides with double dealings.

In 1425, Ahmad Shah Wali's movements in Mahur frightened Hoshang Shah who sent an expedition into neighbouring Kherla. The first two attempts failed to achieve any decisive result. Three years later, in 1428–29, Hoshang Shah personally marched with a large force to subdue Kherla. The news of his advance alarmed Rai Nar Singh, ruler of Kherla, who appealed to Ahmad Shah Bahmani for assistance. Ahmad Shah ordered Abdul Qadir, governor of Berar to march to Nar Singh, while he himself advanced with 6,000 to 7,000 cavalry. Nar Singh, pressed between two powers, sought to appease Hoshang Shah, whose territory lay closer, by shifting allegiance. While Ahmad Shah delayed reaching, Hoshang pressed forward by forced marches with an army of 30,000. Ahmad Shah also advanced but perceiving the difficulty of confronting such a large force with his smaller army, withdrew into Bahmani territory. Hoshang Shah misled into thinking the Bahmanis were weak, pursued and encamped on the very ground Ahmad had vacated. Ahmad Shah's army was not retreating but ready in full battle array. Fighting began, and Hoshang, unprepared, engaged with only 17,000 men. Ahmad Shah fell on the Malwa army with 10,000 cavalry and 12 elephants. After a day of fierce combat, the Malwa forces were defeated. Hoshang was routed, fleeing toward Malwa. In the confusion, 2,000 of his soldiers were slain, while his elephants and even members of his harem, including two daughters, fell into Bahmani hands. As Hoshang retreated, Rai Nar Singh of Kherla seized the opportunity to attack the disordered Malwa army, inflicting further damage. Thus, Hoshang Shah's campaign against Kherla ended in complete disaster. Ahmad Shah later returned the princesses with great honour.

After Hoshang's defeat Narsingh Rai switched allegiance to the Bahmani Sultanate. But in 1433, when Ahmad Shah was busy with the Gujarat Sultanate, Hoshang Shah attacked Kherla, killed Narsingh Rai, and took the fort with its lands. He added Kherla to Malwa, while Narsingh Rai's son Kosal Rai accepted his authority and was made chief under Malwa.

== Aftermath ==
Following the conquest, Kherla which included Betul, became part of the Malwa Sultanate and renamed as Mahmudabad. This marked the end of the independent Kherla dynasty. After Sultan Hoshang's death Kherla had become independent again. When Sultan Mahmud Khalji advanced toward his capital, the ruler Narsingh Deo promptly submitted. He came out of the fort, personally attended the Sultan, and offered eleven elephants as tribute. In 1465, Mahmud Khalji removed Narsingh Rai's descendant Harnaik Zuanardar appointing Siraj-ul-mulk as its governor. He also strengthened its fortifications and renamed it Mahmudabad. In 1562, Akbar conquered Malwa and Kherla principality came under Mughal possession. The Gond kingdom of Kherla, subordinate of Deogarh was annexed by Raghuji of the Kingdom of Nagpur in 1743.

== See also ==
- Muzaffar Shah's invasion of Malwa
- Lodi–Tomaras War
- Mughal–Mrauk U Wars

== Bibliography ==
- Day, Upendra Nath (1965). Medieval Malwa: A Political and Cultural History, 1401-1562. Munshi Ram Manohar Lal. ISBN 978-81-215-0401-0.
- Shrivastav, P. N. (1971). Gazetteer of India Madhya Pradesh: Betul. Bhopal, Madhya Pradesh: Government Central Press.
- Habib, Mohammad; Nizami, Khaliq Ahmad, eds. (1970). A Comprehensive History of India: The Delhi Sultanat (A.D. 1206-1526). Vol. V. People's Publishing House.
- Sherwani, Haroon Khan (1946). The Bahmanis of the Deccan. Munshiram Manoharlal.
