= War of the Goldsmith's Daughter =

Fifteenth century war between the Bahmani Sultanate and the Vijayanagar empire

The War of the Goldsmith's Daughter
- Part of Bahmani–Vijayanagar Wars
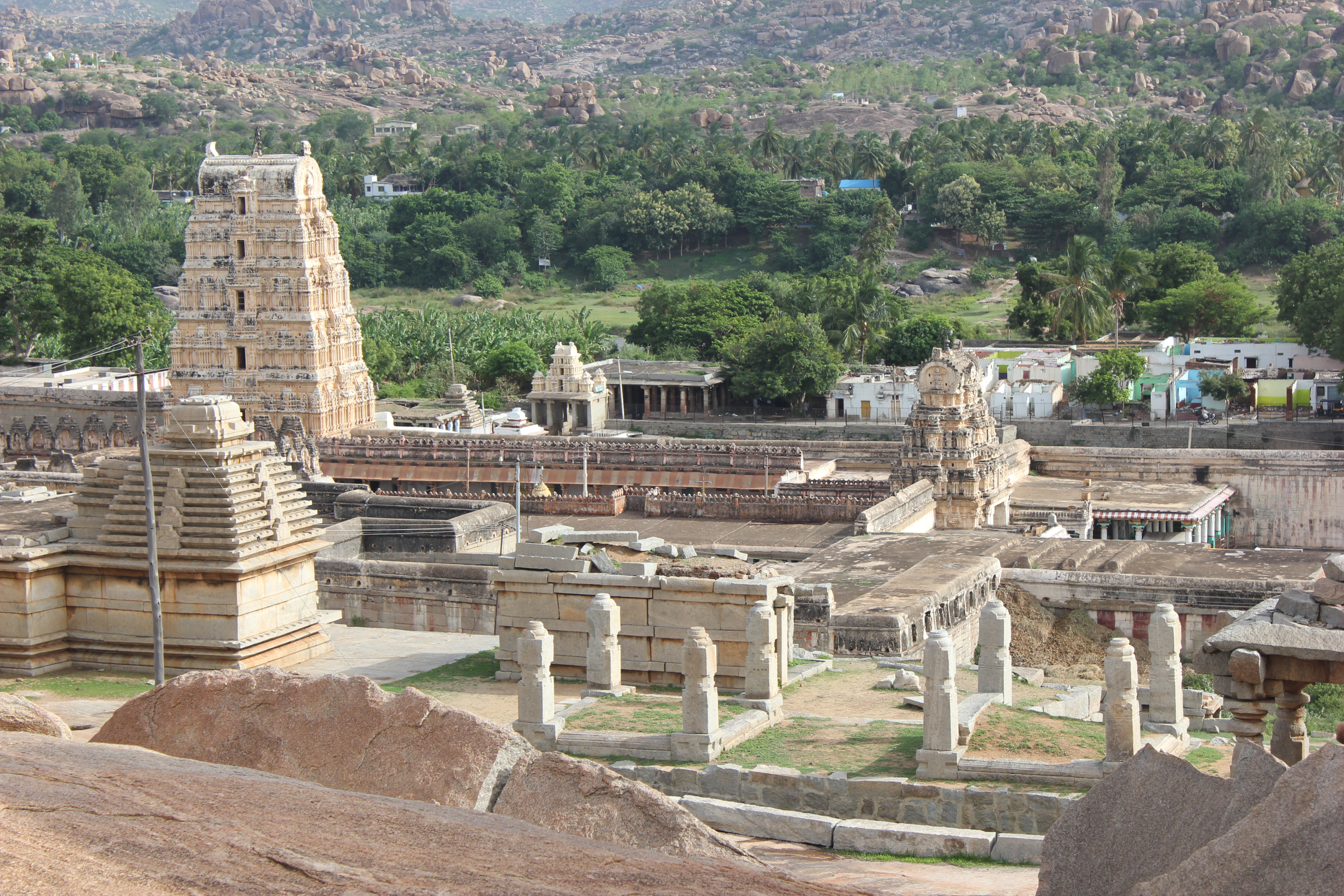
- A temple from the capital of Vijayanagar
Date	1406
Location	Mudgal, Vijayanagar, present day Karnataka 15°20′04″N 76°27′44″E
Result	Bahmani victory
Territorial changes	Bankapur annexed to Bahmani Sultanate.; Reddis and Velamas received their lost land from Vijayanagar.

Belligerents
Bahmani Sultanate; Reddi Kingdom; Velama chiefs	Vijayanagar empire

Commanders and leaders
Firuz Shah Bahmani (WIA); Ahmad Shah I Wali; Faulad Khan; Fazlullah Inju; Khan-i Khanan; Anapota Velama; Peda Komati Vema; Sarnaubat Siddu	Deva Raya I (surrendered)
- The capital of the Vijayanagar empire, which was besieged by Bahmanis War of the Goldsmith's Daughter (India)

The War of the Goldsmith's Daughter or the Bahmani–Vijayanagar War of 1406 was a significant conflict between the Bahmani Sultanate and the Vijayanagar Empire, the two primary powers in the Deccan region of thirteenth and fourteenth century India, occurring in 1406. Led by Tajuddin Firuz Shah, the Bahmani forces, supported by Velama chiefs and the Reddis, launched multiple attacks on the Vijayanagar empire ruled by Deva Raya I. Despite his initial resistance, Deva Raya suffered heavy casualties, ultimately leading to the acceptance of the terms imposed by the Bahmanis, ending the war.

Following the Bahmani–Vijayanagar war of 1398, Bahmani ruler Firuz Shah directed his attention northward to quell Rajput rebellions within his territories. Meanwhile, the Vijayanagar ruler Harihara II died in 1404, sparking a succession struggle among his sons, namely Virupaksha Raya, Bukka Raya II, and Deva Raya I. Although Virupaksha Raya briefly ascended to the Vijayanagar throne, his reign lasted only a few months before his brother Bukka Raya II took over. However, in 1406, Deva Raya I ousted Bukka and proclaimed himself king of Vijayanagar.

Following Deva Raya I's ascension, a Brahmin saint returning from pilgrimage in Banaras recounted his encounter with a goldsmith's daughter named Parthal in Mudgal Doab, praising her beauty, musical prowess, and other virtues. Intrigued by the Brahmin's description, Deva Raya dispatched him to Parthal's home to propose marriage on his behalf. However, Parthal, mindful of the recent succession turmoil in Vijayanagar and aware of the fate of girls who ventured to the kingdom that they never came back to their families, as well as the practice of Sati, declined Deva Raya's proposal. Instead, she expressed a desire to wed an Islamic prince.

Infuriated by the rejection, Deva Raya personally led his army to Mudgal to abduct Parthal. Sensing the impending threat, the goldsmith sought refuge in Bahmani territories. In response, the Bahmani Governor of Mudgal Doab, Faulad Khan, confronted and defeated the Vijayanagar forces, repelling their invasion.

Upon learning of Deva Raya's aggression, Firuz Shah personally led the Bahmani forces, bolstered by allies from the Reddi Kingdom and Velama chiefs who harbored grievances against Vijayanagar over territorial disputes. Initially encountering resistance, the Bahmani forces persevered and launched multiple assaults on Vijayanagar strongholds.

As the campaign progressed, the Bahmanis seized the strategic Bankapur region, a major trade center, and systematically conquered various Vijayanagar territories. Faced with overwhelming odds, Deva Raya had no choice but to seek peace and surrender. Accepting the terms imposed by the Bahmanis, Deva Raya agreed to relinquish all lands captured by the Bahmanis during the campaign as dowry, return the territories taken from the Reddis and Velamas, and offer his daughter in marriage to Firuz Shah.

The treaty, though humiliating for Deva Raya, marked the end of the conflict, with the marriage between Parthal, the daughter of the goldsmith, and Hassan Khan, the son of Firuz Shah, cementing the agreement between the two powers.

== Background ==
The Bahmani Sultanate and Vijayanagara Empire, two prominent kingdoms in the Deccan during the fourteenth and fifteenth centuries, engaged in frequent military conflicts since their inception. Following the initial Bahmani–Vijayanagar war, a period of three decades ensued marked by peace, between the two empires, largely due to the pacifist reign of Bahmani ruler Muhammad Shah II. However, with the accession of Tajuddin Firuz Shah, hostilities resumed between the Bahmanis and Vijayanagar. Concurrently, during the rebellion of Sagar on the northern frontier of the Bahmani Sultanate, Vijayanagara ruler Harihara II seized the opportunity to launch an invasion into the southern frontier of the Bahmani Sultanate, thus sparking the second war between the two powers. The second Bahmani-Vijayanagar war in 1398 concluded with the Bahmanis emerging victorious. Following their triumph, Vijayanagara Emperor Harihara II sought peace by offering one million Huns in tribute to the Bahmanis.

=== Influence of Timur ===
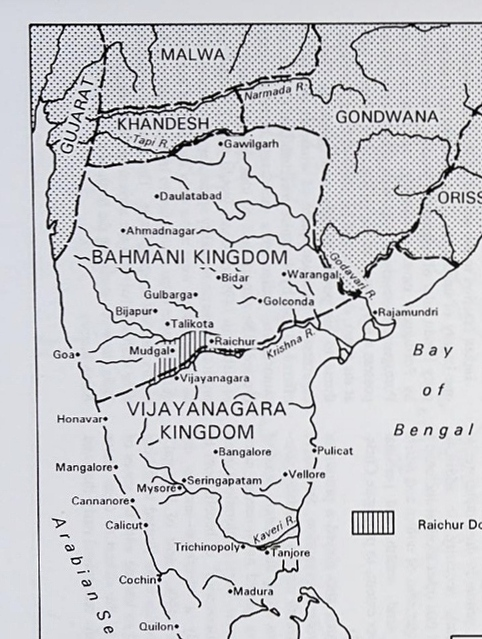
The map depicting the Kingdoms of Deccan India

After Timur's invasion of Delhi in 1398, he departed for his capital in Samarkand without establishing a permanent presence. Firuz Shah, who was engaged in conflict with Vijayanagar during that period, recognized an opportunity in Timur's departure. Understanding that Timur could alleviate his northern concerns, Firuz Shah dispatched ambassadors bearing lavish gifts. Their mission was to convey Firuz Shah's willingness to become one of Timur's allies and to offer his support in any future campaigns to conquer all of Hindustan. Additionally, the ambassadors were instructed to sway influential courtiers in Timur's court to support Firuz Shah's cause. Their efforts proved successful, as Timur agreed to accept Firuz Shah's offer of nominal suzerainty and bestowed sovereignty over Malwa and Gujarat upon him. From his end, Timur reciprocated by sending a royal robe, a Turki slave, and four Syrian horses of unparalleled quality, surpassing any previously witnessed in the Deccan region.

The rulers of the Malwa Sultanate, Gujarat Sultanate, and Khandesh Sultanate, upon learning of the alliance between Firuz Shah and Timur, conveyed to Timur that they considered themselves as brothers to the Bahmanis. However, behind the scenes, they clandestinely sent a message to Harihara II, the reigning monarch of Vijayanagar, expressing their willingness to provide active military assistance whenever they are in trouble with the Bahmanis. However, Firuz came to know about the secret message sent by the Sultanates to Vijayanagar.

=== Revolt at Kherla ===
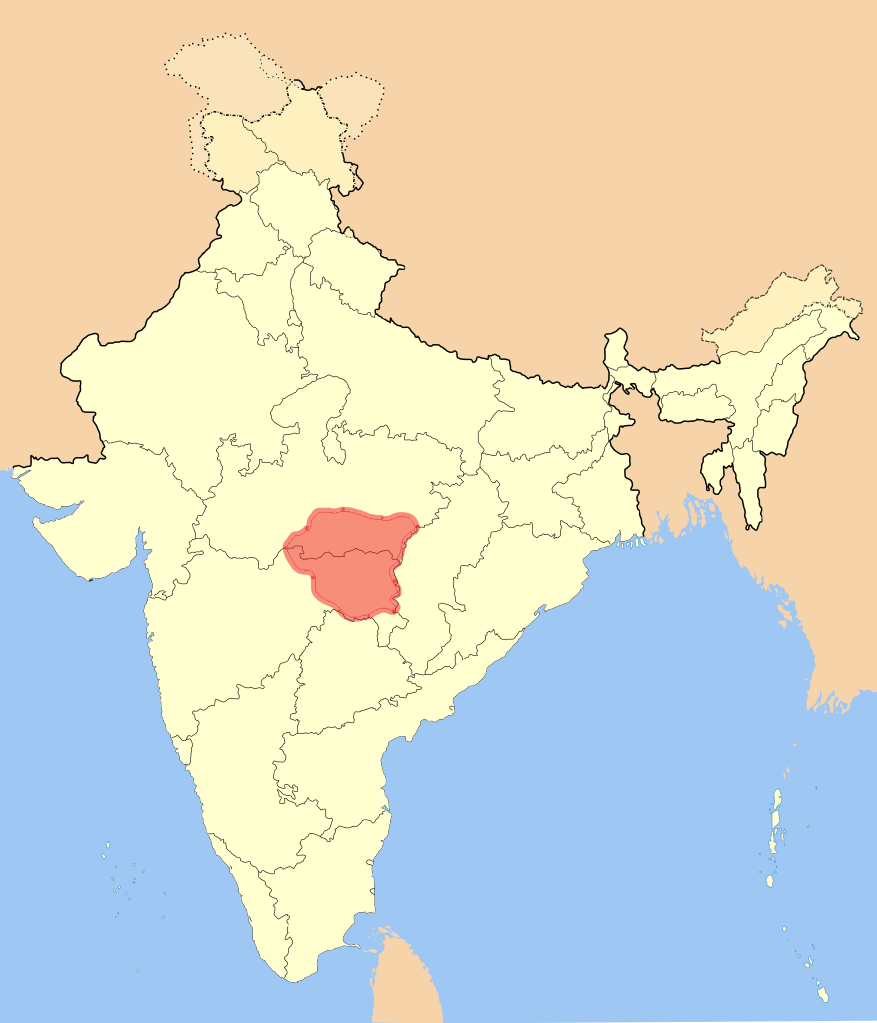
Gondwana or Kherla region

After the war of 1398, Firuz Shah relocated to Kherla, where he had encountered a revolt prior to the conflict. The local ruler of Mahur surrendered to him, having previously aligned with Narsingh Rai, the Rajput leader of the rebellion. From there, Firuz dispatched a letter to Narsingh demanding tribute, but Narsingh adamantly refused, prompting a battle between them. Firuz then moved to Ellichpur, where the decisive battle took place, resulting in the death of prominent Bahmani amirs such as Shuja‘at Khan, Bahadur Khan, Dilawar Khan, and Rustam Khan. Firuz himself took to the battlefield to lead his forces.

Firuz emerged victorious over the Rajputs, capturing Narsingh's son Kaushal Singh as a prisoner of war. Narsingh then retreated to the fort of Kherla, where Bahmani forces besieged him. Eventually, Narsingh surrendered to Firuz, agreeing to pay tribute. The siege lasted for two months, after which Narsingh laid down his arms and personally approached the Sultan at Ellichpur, pleading to accept tribute as his ancestors on the Gulbarga throne had done before him. Additionally, Narsingh requested that his daughter be taken into the royal palace as one of the royal servants and offered forty elephants, five maunds of gold, and fifty maunds of silver as gifts. In return, Firuz restored Kherla to Narsingh, appointed him as an amir of the kingdom, and bestowed upon him robes of state, including an embroidered cap.

=== Struggle of succession at Vijayanagar ===
After the passing of Harihara II in 1404, a succession struggle ensued among his sons, including Virupaksha Raya I, Bukka Raya II, Deva Raya I, Sadasiva Raya, and Ramachandra Raya. Virupaksha eventually ascended to the throne and ruled for a brief period, during which he conducted military campaigns in the southern regions, adding to the empire's conquests. Bukka Raya II, the sibling of Virupaksha, seized the throne from Virupaksha and ruled for a span of two years. The rule of Bukka Raya II was short-lived, as he was succeeded by his brother Deva Raya I in 1406.

With Deva Raya I ascending the throne, the Vijayanagar Empire gained a capable and energetic leader. Under his reign, the empire reached its zenith of power. Deva Raya, along with his supporters, saw themselves as champions of Hindu civilization, with a dynamic system that unified the diverse elements of the south and aimed to push back against Muslim invasions. This sentiment had been growing during the reign of Harihara II but was fully realized under Deva Raya's leadership. His resolute military prowess contrasted with the perceived incompetence of his predecessors, particularly Bukka II, ultimately leading to his ascension to the throne. This marked the beginning of a new era for the empire.

== Prelude ==
=== The goldsmith's daughter ===
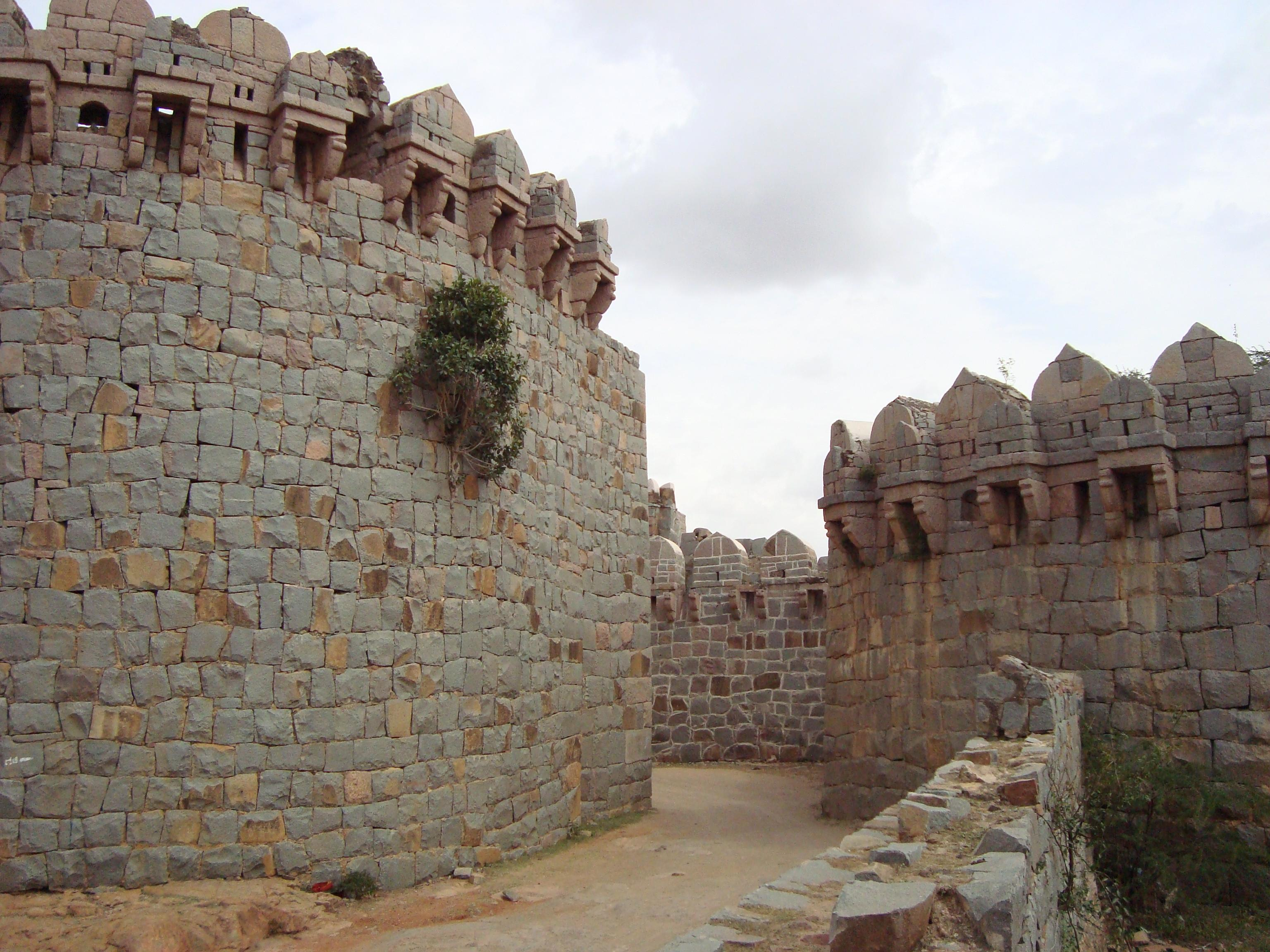
A fort at Mudgal

During the early weeks of Deva Raya's reign, an elderly Brahmin appeared at his court, bearing a tale that captured Deva Raya's imagination. The Brahmin recounted his recent pilgrimage to Benares on the Ganges, during which he passed through the city of Mudgal in the Doab. There, he learned of a goldsmith who resided in a nearby village and boasted a daughter of extraordinary beauty. Intrigued, the Brahmin decided to visit the goldsmith's home, where he was warmly welcomed. When Deva Raya I learned of the remarkable talents of his host's daughter, he expressed a desire to meet her. Upon seeing the daughter, named Parthal, the Brahmin was astounded by her surpassing beauty. He was so impressed that he decided to adopt her as his own child, eighteen months prior, in the summer of 1405. The Brahmin devoted himself to teaching Parthal music and dancing, skills in which he was an instructor in the temples. Remarkably, Parthal displayed a proficiency in these arts that matched her physical beauty, leading the Brahmin to believe that the gods had crafted her to be perfect in every aspect.

The Brahmin informed the Deva Raya that, in accordance with tradition, her parents had initially intended to arrange her betrothal in her childhood to a young man of her caste. However, she had fervently pleaded for the postponement of the ceremony, leading to the abandonment of the plan. Consequently, the Brahmin explained, this beautiful maiden remained unmarried. Now, thanks to his teachings, she possessed the ability to adorn any position, no matter how esteemed, even within Vijayanagar itself. The Brahmin's narrative ignited Deva Raya's imagination, and he expressed a strong desire to have her as his own. However, the Brahmin insisted that his foster daughter should not be reduced to a mere royal concubine or risk descending into the role of a temple prostitute. The Emperor must extend to her an honorable marriage proposal. Eventually, it was settled that the Brahmin would return to Mudgal as the envoy of the Vijayanagar Raya, bearing lavish gifts for the girl's parents. Along with these gifts, he would present an offer of marriage to their daughter, bestowing upon her the esteemed title of Rani, or Princess.

=== The marriage proposal ===
The Brahmin proceeded to Mudgal and conveyed to the parents the immense opportunity awaiting their daughter by entering the Raya's zenana. Upon arrival, the Brahmin conveyed the Raya's commands to Parthal's parents, assuring them that the Doab rightfully belonged to the Vijayanagar Empire. He urged them to promptly obey the commands of their rightful sovereign and accompany their daughter to the capital. Overjoyed by this stroke of good fortune, the parents eagerly presented the princely gifts of the Emperor to Parthal, congratulating her on her elevation from the humble caste of goldsmith to the esteemed position of the bride of the Vijayanagar ruler. Subsequently, the Brahmin attempted to adorn her with a golden necklace adorned with jewels, symbolizing the unbreakable pledge of betrothal. However, Parthal herself vehemently rejected the idea and adamantly refused to leave Mudgal. She explained to her parents that once a girl entered the Raya's palace, she never returned in her lifetime and never saw her parents again.

Despite her resolution and tears, Parthal's parents were deeply moved, as they had been on a previous occasion. Ultimately, they reluctantly informed the Brahmin that they were unwilling to resort to force, returning the necklace along with the other gifts. Consequently, the Brahmin was compelled to return to Vijayanagar, reporting the unexpected failure of his mission.

Once the Brahmin had departed, the goldsmith's daughter gradually confided in her parents, revealing additional reasons for her refusal. She expressed concerns about the stability of the Vijayanagar throne, noting that two rulers had died in the past two years. She had spoken to individuals who had witnessed events in Vijayanagar during those tumultuous times. She explained that the practice of Sati was particularly horrifying in Vijayanagar, where numerous women were immolated upon the death of the Raya. For instance, at Harihara II's funeral, hundreds, if not thousands, of women, including all his queens, many of whom were young girls like herself, had been sacrificed. While some believed these princesses regarded it as an honor, she did not share this perspective. Parthal refused to marry the new ruler, who had recently seized the throne and might not hold onto it for long.

Furthermore, Parthal disclosed that she had long held an inner conviction that she would one day wed a prince of the Islamic faith. Although she did not reveal what had instilled this conviction or if she had a specific prince in mind, she remained steadfast in her belief.

=== Aftermath of the rejection ===
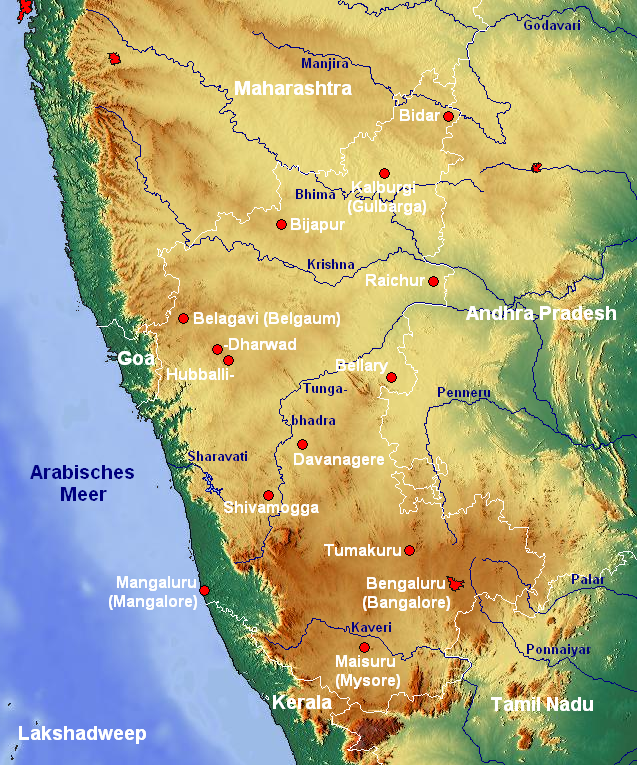
The map of Karnataka, including the Tungabhadra River

Upon the old Brahmin's return to Vijayanagar and his recounting of the failed mission, Deva Raya erupted in anger. He adamantly refused to accept defeat in such a manner, fearing ridicule within his own court. Accustomed to having his every command promptly obeyed, he could not tolerate being thwarted. Declaring his intention to satisfy his desires by force, Deva Raya announced to the Brahmin and his court that he would seize the girl who had rejected his engagement necklace, even if she resided beyond the Tungabhadra River. Moreover, he viewed this incident as aligning with his broader strategy for reclaiming the Doab, almost interpreting it as an auspicious sign.

Deva Raya, despite the counsel of his advisors, he resolved to take action. He mobilized an army of thirty thousand soldiers and commanded five thousand cavalry, along with a sizable infantry force, to cross the Tungabhadra River. Their mission was to advance on Mudgal, kidnap the girl, and bring her back to his capital, thus violating the recently forged treaty between his father Harihara II and the Bahmani Sultan Taj ud-Din Firuz Shah.

Upon hearing that a Vijayanagar army had crossed the river, the goldsmith and the people of Mudgal chose to abandon their homes and seek refuge in the jungle. To safeguard their lives, they relocated to the territories of the Bahmanis. Failing to locate their intended target, the Vijayanagar army resorted to pillaging and plundering as they retreated.

=== Repelling the Vijayanagar army from Tungabhadra ===
Upon hearing about the invasion of Vijayanagar, the Bahmani Governor of Mudgal named Faulad Khan, came to defend the Doab. However, the Vijayanagar forces, who were numerically superior to the Bahmani Governor's army, defeated him and forced him to retreat. The Governor was able to collect reinforcements and set out again. The invaders, not realizing they were being followed by a defeated army, became careless. As a result, the Governor managed to surprise and completely defeat them, with the loss of over one-third of their number, before they could recross the Tungabhadra river.

== The War ==
Faulad Khan, following the successful repulsion of the Vijayanagar forces, dispatched a letter to Firozabad, where Firuz Shah was located, detailing the incident. War was, indeed, inevitable. For four years, Firuz had refrained from insisting on the payment of tribute outlined in the last peace settlement with Harihara II. However, he was not willing to tolerate invasion. Seeing an opportunity to settle scores with the Vijayanagar Empire, Firuz, along with his brother Ahmad Shah Wali, mustered a sizable army, which included Khan-I Khanan, Fazlullah Inju and Sarnaubat Siddu. They marched to the Tungabhadra and crossed it unopposed. Concurrently, Firuz sought support from his Hindu allies, namely Anapota Velama of Warangal and the Reddies of the Krishna Delta, urging them to join forces in restraining the ambitions of Vijayanagar. The Reddis, especially eager to reclaim their territories south of the Krishna and seek retribution against their adversary Deva Raya, found a charismatic leader in Peda Komati Vema, who ascended to the throne of Kondavidu in 1402. Known for his prowess in warfare and scholarship, Peda Komati Vema emerged as one of the most distinguished Hindu rulers of his era, despite not being the most powerful.

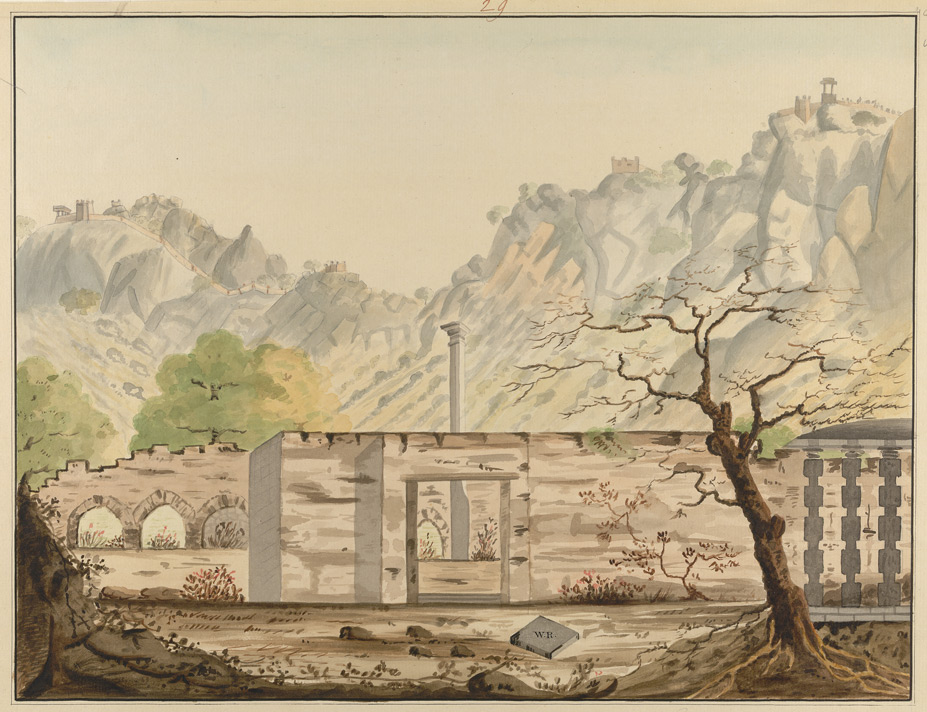
Kondavidu fort of the Reddis

=== First attack on Vijayanagar ===
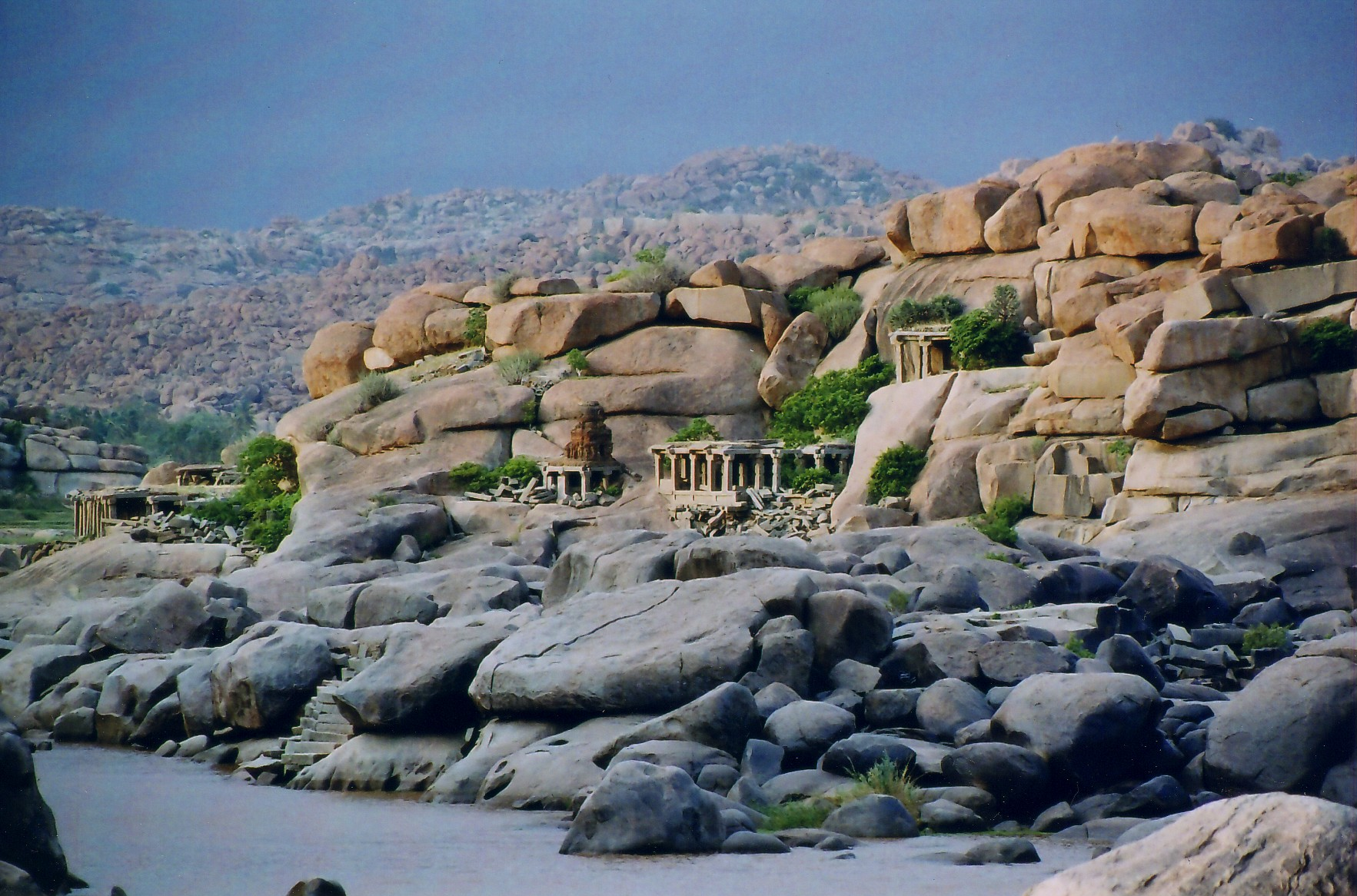
A fort at Vijayanagar

Witnessing the approach of the Bahmani army, Deva Raya opted to retreat towards his capital. His actions led to unforeseen consequences, as now Firuz himself marched against him. Upon entering the formidable capital, Firuz awaited the Bahmanis. In the hilly terrain and especially in the close-quarter combat in the suburbs of the grand city, the Bahmani troops lost their advantage stemming from their superior cavalry. Additionally, they found themselves in hostile territory, facing staunch resistance from defenders fueled by fanatical courage.

The Sultan launched an assault on the city and managed to secure control over the suburbs and some streets within the inner walls. However, as the fighting intensified with their advance, the elite troops of Vijayanagar, although locally recruited, fiercely opposed the Bahmani progression. This steadfast resistance forced Firuz to withdraw without successfully penetrating into the palace precincts. Firuz sustained a wound from an arrow, compelling him to retreat. His forces withdrew for twenty-four miles, fortified their camp, and paused to allow their wounded soldiers to recuperate. Despite Deva Raya launching eighteen attacks on the Bahmani camp, he was defeated on every occasion. Deva Raya dispatched letters to the rulers of Malwa, Gujarat, and Khandesh, seeking their assistance. However, due to the sudden outbreak of war, they were unable to provide aid to Vijayanagar.

=== Council of the war ===
Following these events, Firuz convened a council of war to assess the general strategy of the struggle. It became evident that weakening, and potentially destroying, the Vijayanagar Empire required a gradual approach of encroachment and devastation, as the traditional method of a direct assault on the capital was not feasible. The objective was to confine Deva Raya within Vijayanagar without engaging in direct combat. He made a plan to defeat Vijayanagar by assigning duties to each of his contingents.

1. The Bahmani forces needed to recapture their territories in the west.
2. The Reddis and Velamas should launch an invasion into the eastern rear of the Vijayanagar territories.
3. Ahmad Shah should launch an attack on south of the Vijayanagar with a force of 10,000.
4. Fazlullah Inju, his best general should make an attack at Bankapur, to besiege the fort.
5. Firuz will besiege Adoni, leaving Khan-I Khanan, who proved his merit by fighting with Vijayanagar.

=== Attacks on Vijayanagar ===
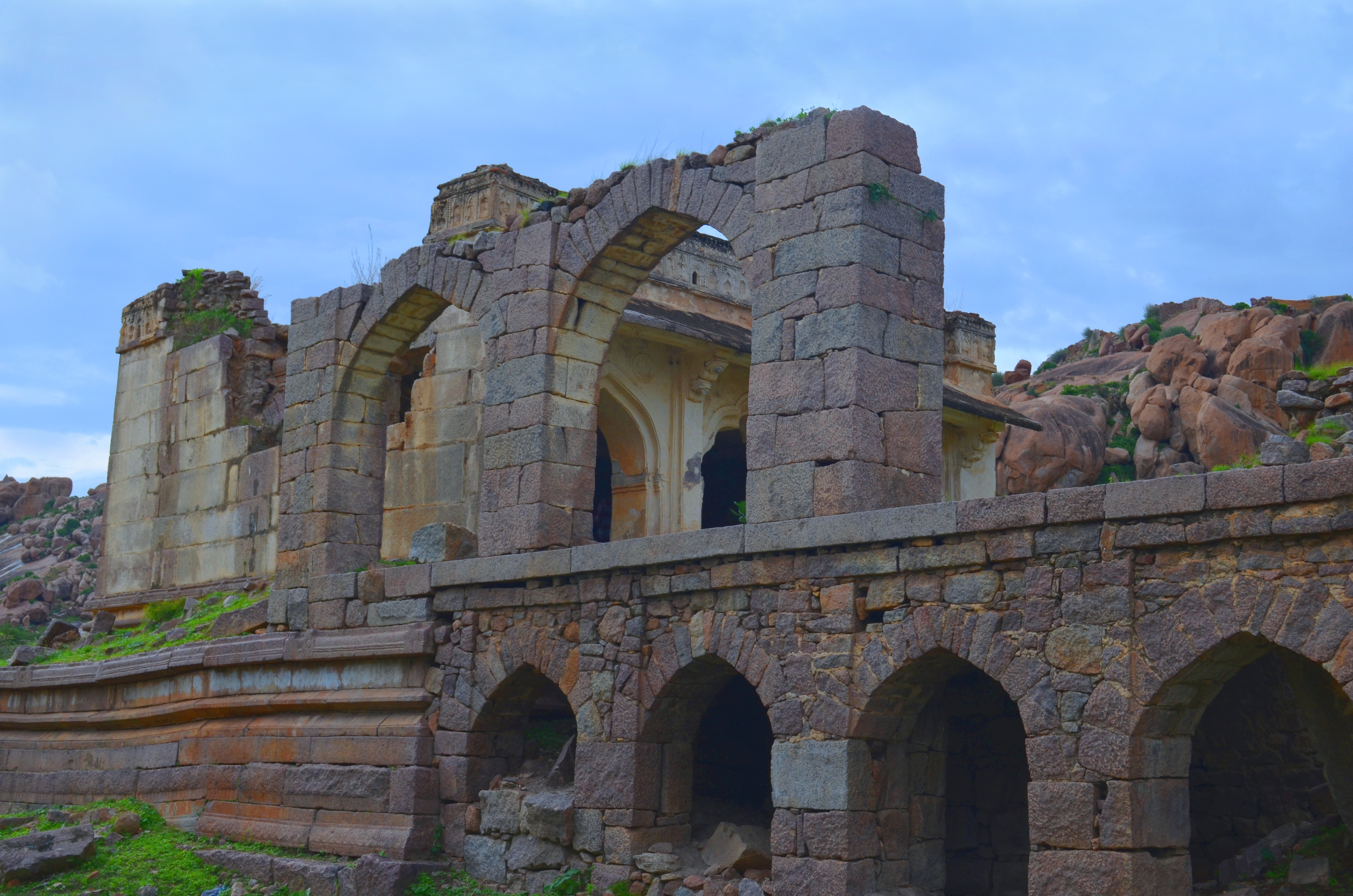
Adoni fort

Fazlullah Inju, Firuz's prime minister tasked with besieging Bankapur, not only captured the fortress but also brought the surrounding region under obedience, extending the kingdom's influence to the Tungabhadra River. This strategic move effectively established the river as the southern boundary of the kingdom. Bankapur, being a crucial fortress in the western region, controlled trade routes to the Arabian Sea, a vital source of wealth for both the Sultanate and Vijayanagar.

In the east, the Reddis had already crossed the Kistna River. To prevent Deva Raya from pursuing these expeditions, Firuz stationed the majority of his army near the capital, fortifying their camp in the Turkish fashion with a circle of gun carriages. This strategic decision proved effective, as Deva Raya attempted multiple attacks on the Bahmani camp but was consistently repelled with significant losses in the open plain.

This situation persisted for approximately four months. Deva Raya, after several sorties, realized the futility of trying to dislodge Firuz's army with the forces available in Vijayanagar. However, he anxiously awaited the arrival of armies from other provinces of the Empire, which his emissaries had been dispatched to summon.

Deva Raya realized that what began as an attempt to abduct a girl from the Doab had escalated into a major war. Despite his impatience in Vijayanagar, he found the Empire's machinery unable to function rapidly or effectively enough. The news he received about the ongoing struggle was consistently disheartening. The frontier along the Tungabhadra and the Krishna, which he had hoped to advance, appeared to have collapsed entirely. In the west, Firuz's general, Fazlullah, captured the fortress of Bankapur, bringing valuable trade routes under Bahmani control. Meanwhile, the Sultan's brother, Ahmad, ravaged the prosperous towns and districts of the Kanarese country to the south of the city, the former territory of the Hoysala Kingdom. In the east, an army from Warangal crossed the Kistna, while downstream, the Reddis, led by Peda Komati Vema, proved formidable opponents for Vijayanagar troops in Deva Raya's absence. The Hindu allies of the Bahmanis systematically reclaimed disputed areas previously won for the Empire by Deva Raya's father's Viceroy in the east. After several significant victories, the allied armies converged and descended upon Udayagiri itself.

Ahmad returned to the royal camp bearing a rich haul of gold and approximately 60,000 captives, both male and female. His triumphant return coincided with Fazlullah's successes at Bankapur and in the western region, prompting Firuz to organize a grand celebration, complete with a splendid festival and the distribution of rewards to the entire army. Around this time, an embassy from the Velama King arrived at the Bahmani camp to coordinate further military actions, leading to the allies devising a plan for future operations.

It was decided that Ahmad would be granted a period of rest from his exertions and would remain stationed outside Vijayanagar. Meanwhile, Firuz and Fazlullah would march to join forces with the Velama troops and lay siege to Adoni, a formidable fortress downstream to the east. Adoni, which had never been captured since falling into Vijayanagar hands, was perhaps one of the strongest fortresses in Deva Raya's possession, second only to the capital itself. Firuz took measures to ensure that refugees would carry news of these developments back to Vijayanagar.

Deva Raya received alarming news that the Muslim Kings in the north were unwilling to offer him any assistance, as they were embroiled in their own conflict. Learning of Firuz's plan to march eastward, Deva Raya was filled with despair. Not only was his entire northern frontier collapsing, but he and his advisors also had to contemplate how long the recently incorporated southern territories would remain loyal under such circumstances. It appeared that there was no end in sight to the process of dismantling the Vijayanagar Empire. Consequently, Deva Raya dispatched some of his chiefs to inquire about the terms of peace with the Sultan.

Initially, Firuz adamantly refused to entertain any terms of peace. Eager to lead a successful campaign and bolster his reputation to match that of his brother and Fazlullah, he was resolute in his stance. However, Fazlullah, supported by more moderate advisers of the Sultan, pleaded with Firuz to pursue peace. Their arguments were compelling. It was crucial for Firuz to return to his own kingdom and resume governance. At that moment, Deva Raya appeared willing to accept almost any terms Firuz proposed. Yet, there remained uncertainty about the possibility of warfare erupting along the northern frontier of the Sultanate.

== Aftermath ==
The Bahmanis likely possessed more concrete intelligence than Deva Raya regarding the gradual mobilization of new armies by the Southern Viceroys of the Empire, armies that could potentially shift the military balance. Either of these developments might compel the Sultan to agree to a less favorable peace deal than what he could currently demand. Finally, Firuz relented. The proposals presented to Vijayanagar included an indemnity of ten lakhs of hoons in gold (approximately five million dollars), the same amount agreed upon seven years prior. Additionally, Vijayanagar was to provide a large quantity of pearls, fifty prized elephants, and 2,000 male and female slaves—singers, dancers, and musicians, for which Vijayanagar was renowned. Firuz also insisted that Deva Raya give him his daughter in marriage, along with the surrender of the fortress of Bankapur as her dowry, which would be definitively surrendered to the Bahmani Kingdom.

For their allies, the Bahmanis aimed to secure the traditional Reddi lands south of the Krishna River. However, they made it clear that no harm should come to what their allies deemed as the undisputed territory of the Vijayanagar Empire itself. The primary objective for the Bahmanis was to curtail the expansionist ambitions of Vijayanagar. They understood that this goal aligned with the desires of their allies, the Velamas and Reddis. To solidify the alliance between the two states, a marriage bond was proposed. Once this pact was sealed, the Sultanate could then focus its attention on affairs in the north.

Ahmad Shah Wali and his faction, the Ghazis, the religious fighters, were dissatisfied with this policy. They did not view the Bahmani Sultanate as simply an Indian kingdom engaged in political and economic interactions with Muslims and Hindus alike, but rather as the forefront of expanding Islam. The Ghazis believed that all Hindus were heathens and natural enemies, and they always preferred wars over non-believers.

The individuals whom Ahmad listened to were less concerned about the welfare and prosperity of the Bahmani Sultanate as a whole. They also harbored mistrust towards Firuz due to his affinity towards Hindu practices. The policy of forming alliances with Hindu powers such as the Velamas was already contentious for them. However, an understanding with Vijayanagar, solidified by a marriage bond that would further increase Hindu influence at court, and the possibility of eventual conflict with Muslim princes to the north instead of infidels, was nearly intolerable for the war faction.

It was only Ahmad's begrudging and stubborn loyalty to his brother that restrained them from taking more drastic actions. The marriage between the daughter of Deva Raya and Firuz was celebrated with great pomp, yet it failed to foster goodwill between the two kingdoms. When escorting Firuz from Vijayanagar to his camp, Deva Raya turned back prematurely, leading to a parting marked by anger between the two rulers.

As Firuz was the most powerful and illustrious Muslim ruler in India, he did not view the marriage to the daughter of the Raya of Vijayanagar as humiliating to his defeated adversary. However, to Deva Raya, this was the ultimate humiliation.

Upon his return to Firuzabad, Firuz dispatched messengers to Mudgal to summon the beautiful Parthal and her parents. The girl was wedded to Hasan Khan, Firuz's son, and her parents were bestowed with monetary gifts and granted ownership of their native village. It is likely that during this event, the goldsmiths of the Deccan were once again permitted to resume their ancestral profession as bankers and money-changers, from which they had been prohibited by the decree of Muhammad Shah I.
