= Hoshang Shah's invasion of Orissa =

1422 Malwa Sultanate campaign in Orissa

Date	1422
Location	Jajnagar, Orissa 20.85°N 86.33°E
Result	Malwa Sultanate victory

Belligerents
Malwa Sultanate	Eastern Ganga dynasty

Commanders and leaders
Hoshang Shah	Bhanudeva IV (POW)

Strength
1,000 cavalry	500 cavalry

Casualties and losses
Unknown	Heavy
- 75 elephants were paid to Hoshang Shah as ransom for Bhanudeva's release
- Location within Odisha Jajnagar (India)

The Hoshang Shah's invasion on Jajnagar, in 1422 AD was a bold military expedition led by Sultan Hoshang Shah (r. 1406–1435) of the Malwa Sultanate against the Eastern Ganga dynasty of Orissa in eastern India. Seeking to strengthen his army with war elephants to counter his rival, Ahmad Shah I of Gujarat Sultanate, Hoshang disguised himself and approximately 1,000 of his horsemen as merchants. After reaching Jajnagar, the capital of Orissa, Hoshang lured Raja Bhanudeva IV (r. 1414–1434) to inspect his merchandise outside the city. A sudden rainstorm that damaged the displayed goods provided a pretext for an attack. The Malwa forces captured the raja, who was held hostage until the payment of a ransom of 75 elephants. Hoshang released Bhanudeva IV only after safely crossing the frontier of Jajnagar and returned to his capital Mandu.

== Background ==
Hoshang Shah attacked Kherla in 1420 AD and defeated Narsingh Rai, who accepted the suzerainty of the Malwa Sultanate. He handed over eighty-four elephants and a large amount of gold as tribute. The acquisition of the elephants significantly strengthened his army, while the tribute helped replenish his treasury, which had been severely depleted due to his earlier wars with Gujarat Sultanate. Hoshang Shah learned that even with the elephants and wealth acquired from Kherla, he was still not strong enough to defeat Ahmad Shah of Gujarat. He had received reports that the ruler of Jajnagar was extremely wealthy, possessed high-quality horses, and large number of massive elephants. To further strengthen his position and augment his resources, he planned an expedition against Jajnagar.

== Invasion ==
Hoshang Shah launched the campaign to Orissa towards the end of 824 AH corresponding to late 1421 AD or the beginning of 825 AH or early 1422 AD. Leaving his cousin Mughis as regent in Malwa, he set out with approximately 1,000 horsemen. To conceal his true intentions, he took the masquerade merchant. His soldiers were similarly dressed as merchants, and the party carried horses and merchandise. Hoshang led this disguised force across the borders of Malwa. Crossing through difficult terrain, dense forests of Gondwana the expedition of 700 miles was covered in a short time at vicinity of Jajnagar, the capital of Orissa. Upon arrival, Hoshang informed Raja Bhanudeva IV of the Eastern Ganga dynasty that he was a merchant from the west bringing a vast quantity of fine merchandise for the king. He requested a large open area outside the town for display, claiming the goods were too numerous for the regular marketplace. Bhanudeva unsuspecting any plot granted permission and agreed to visit the encampment personally to inspect the goods. He offered to purchase items either in cash or in elephants. On the appointed day, Bhanudeva arrived with his courtiers and about 500 horsemen. While the raja and his entourage were examining the displayed goods, a sudden storm brought heavy rain. The downpour, combined with the trampling hooves of the horses, damaged many of the commodities. Seizing this as a perfect excuse, Sultan Hoshang ordered his men to attack. In the ensuing confusion, Bhanudeva's forces were routed and put to flight. Bhanudeva was taken prisoner. Hoshang then revealed his true identity as the Sultan of Malwa. He declared that he had come to Orissa specifically in search of elephants and demanded a heavy ransom for the raja's release.

== Aftermath ==
The leading men of Jajnagar promptly sent an envoy and agreed to his terms. They paid a ransom of seventy-five elephants. As a precautionary measure, Hoshang did not release Bhanudeva immediately. He carried the raja as a hostage while retreating. Only after safely crossing the frontier of the Jajnagar did he release the raja, along with some additional elephants he had taken. Hoshang then returned with his forces towards his capital, Mandu.

== See also ==
- Sharqi invasions of Orissa
- Bengal Sultanate's conquest of Orissa
- Siege of Gagron (1423)

== Bibliography ==
- Habib, Mohammad; Nizami, Khaliq Ahmad (1970). A Comprehensive History of India. Vol. 5, Part 2. People's Publishing House.
- Subrahmanyam, R. (1957). The Sūryavaṁśi Gajapatis of Orissa. Andhra University.
- Haig, W. (1928). The Cambridge History of India: Turks and Afghans, edited by W. Haig. Vol. III. Cambridge University Press.
- Day, Upendra Nath (1965). Medieval Malwa: A Political and Cultural History, 1401-1562. Munshi Ram Manohar Lal. ISBN 978-81-215-0401-0.
