= Siege of Gagron =

Siege of Gagron may refer to:

- Siege of Gagron (1423), Hoshang Shah's capture of the fort
- Siege of Gagron (1444), Mahmud Khalji's capture of the fort
