= Holkunda =

Village in Karnataka, India

- Interactive map of Holkunda
- Coordinates: 17.5280741°N 76.9774798°E
- Country: India
- State: Karnataka
- District: Kalaburagi

Population (2011)
  - Total: 2,496

Holkunda, also known as Holkonda and Holconda, is a village in the Kalaburagi district in the Indian state of Karnataka. It is located about 28 kilometers northeast of the district headquarters Gulbarga, on the NH50.

== History ==
During the Bahmani period, the village was a suburb of Gulbarga, which was the capital of the sultanate. By the British period, it had been reduced to a small village.

== Landmarks ==
A cluster of seven Bahmani mausolea are located within the village. These are very similar to the Haft Gumbaz. Five are situated within a walled compound, and two are situated outside. One of these tombs is revered as a dargah. The complex is listed as a state protected monument.

== Economy ==
Jaggery is the most significant commodity produced in Holkunda.

== Demographics ==
According to the 2011 census, the village had a population of 2495, in 418 households. 964 people belonged the scheduled castes.
