= Siege of Gagron (1423) =

Siege in Rajasthan, India

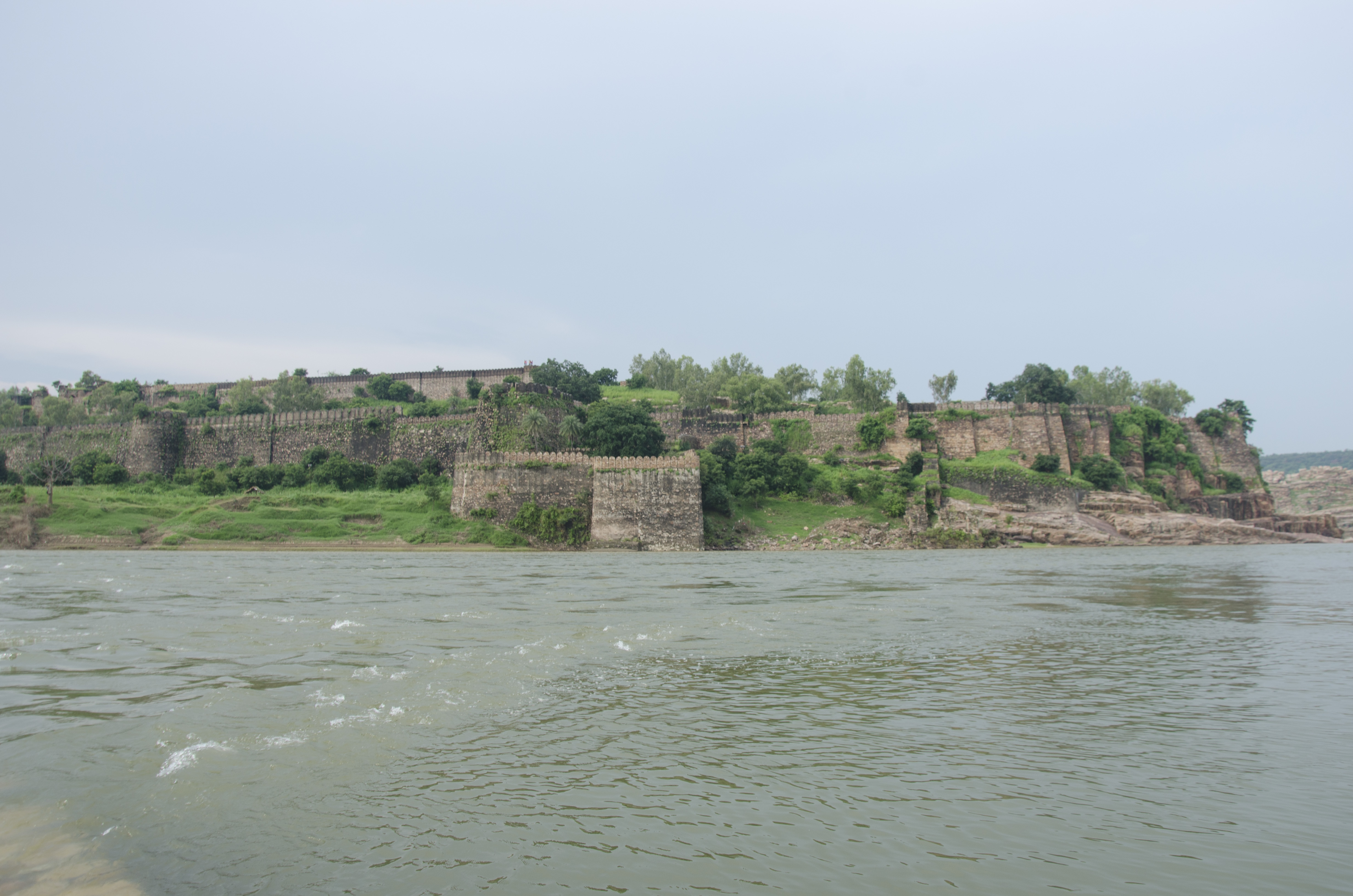
Date	13 – 27 September 1423 (2 weeks)
Location	Gagron Fort, Rajasthan 24.627937°N 76.182957°E
Result	Malwa Sultanate victory
Territorial changes	Gagron annexed to Malwa Sultanate

Belligerents
Malwa Sultanate; Kherla kingdom	Khichi Chauhan Rajputs

Commanders and leaders
Hoshang Shah; Nar Singh Rai; Chandji; Khemji; Lakhan Rao; Maldeo Chauhan; Samar Singh	Achaldas Khichi †

Strength
84 elephants 30,000 cavalry Large infantry	Unknown

Casualties and losses
Unknown	Heavy
- Location within Rajasthan Siege of Gagron (1423) (India)

The Siege of Gagron (1423) was a military campaign by Sultan Hoshang Shah of Malwa Sultanate against the fort of Gagron, a key stronghold of the Khichi Chauhans. In 1423, Hoshang Shah marched with a large army that included contingents from Rai Narsingh of Kherla, Lakhan Rao, chiefs of Bundi, Maldeo Chauhan, Samar Singh, and his own Malwa forces. The siege lasted from 13 September to 27 September 1423. Its ruler Achaldas Khichi sent his son Palhan Singh to seek help from Rana Mokul of Kingdom of Mewar, but no timely assistance arrived. After the Rajputs performed jauhar, Achaldas fell fighting, and the fort was captured by Hoshang Shah. The victory helped consolidate Malwa's control over the strategic region.

== Background ==
In 1421, Sultan Hoshang Shah (r. 1406–1435) of the Malwa Sultanate secretly invaded Jajnagar rule by the Eastern Ganga dynasty. Sultan Hoshang Shah used clever disguise and a sudden storm ambush to capture the Bhanudeva IV and seize elephants as ransom. Bhanudeva's forces paid 75 elephants; Hoshang seized additional elephants before releasing the king only after safely crossing the border. Hoshang proceeded to return Mandu. His rival, Sultan Ahmad Shah I (r. 1411–1442) of Gujarat besieged Mandu only after learning of Hoshang's absence.

== Siege ==
In 1423 AD, Sultan Hoshang Shah assembled a large army of 84 elephants, 30,000 horses, and countless infantry, reinforced by forces from Narsingh Rai of Kherla including his sons Chandji and Khemji, Lakhan Rao of Matangpuri, as well as chiefs of Buni, Maldeo Chauhan and Samar Singh. With this mighty force, he besieged the fort of Gagraun on 13 September 1423 AD. Achaldas Khichi, the defender, sent his son Palhan Singh to seek help from Rana Mokul (r. 1406–1420) of Mewar, but no timely aid arrived. Hoshang cut off the fort's water supply. Though well-provisioned, the fort’s neglected fortifications and water resources proved fatal. When defeat became inevitable, the Rajputs performed Jauhar. Achaldas's queens and thousands of Rajput women immolated themselves, while the men fought to the last and were killed. Achaldas died in the final battle. The fort fell to Hoshang Shah. This victory established Hoshang's suzerainty over the region.

== Aftermath ==
After the conquest of the fort, Hushang Shah changes his focus toward Gwalior. He laid siege for a month and caused damage in the countryside. The timely arrival of Mubarak Shah (r. 1421–1434) from Delhi forced him to abandon the attempt. The two armies encamped near each other but avoided battle, concluding a treaty under which Hushang Shah gave up his plans and returned to his capital by early 1423. In 1444, Mahmud Khalji (r. 1436–1469) of Malwa captured Gagron from the Kinchis again. It fell under Ranga Sanga (r. 1509–1528) and Medini Rai's possession in 1518–1519. Later, the Mughals captured the fort in 1561 AD.

== See also ==
- Siege of Gagron (1444)
- Battle of Gagron
- Battle of Mandalgarh and Banas
- Battle of Maheskar
- Battle of Kapadvanj

== Bibliography ==
- Day, Upendra Nath (1965). Medieval Malwa: A Political and Cultural History, 1401-1562. Munshi Ram Manohar Lal. ISBN 978-81-215-0401-0.
- Haig, W. (1928). The Cambridge History of India: Turks and Afghans, edited by W. Haig. Vol. III. Cambridge University Press.
- Banerjee, A. C.; Ghose, D. K., eds. (1970). A Comprehensive History of India. Vol. 9. People's Publishing House.
- Hooja, Rima (2006). A History of Rajasthan. Rupa & Company. ISBN 978-81-291-0890-6.
- Habib, Mohammad; Nizami, Khaliq Ahmad, eds. (1970). A Comprehensive History of India: The Delhi Sultanat (A.D. 1206-1526). Vol. V. People's Publishing House.
