= Muzaffar Shah's invasion of Malwa =

1407 Gujarat–Malwa War

- Part of Gujarat–Malwa Wars
Date	1407
Location	Dhar, Malwa Sultanate, present day Madhya Pradesh
Result	Gujarat Sultanate victory
Territorial changes	Territories of the Malwa Sultanate annexed to the Gujarat Sultanate

Belligerents
Gujarat Sultanate	Malwa Sultanate

Commanders and leaders
Muzaffar Shah I (WIA)	Hoshang Shah (POW)

Strength
Unknown	Unknown

Casualties and losses
Unknown	Unknown

Muzaffar Shah's invasion of Malwa (1406–1407 CE) was a military campaign launched by Muzaffar Shah I of the Gujarat Sultanate against the newly established Malwa Sultanate. Using the rumoured poisoning of Dilawar Khan Ghuri by his son and successor Hoshang Shah as a pretext, Muzaffar Shah invaded Malwa towards the end of 1406.

In 1407, he advanced on the fort of Dhar, where Hoshang Shah had taken refuge. After an inconclusive battle outside the fort in which both rulers were wounded or dismounted, Muzaffar Shah besieged Dhar. When a direct assault proved difficult, he resorted to deception, proposing a personal meeting. Despite warnings from his advisers, Hoshang Shah accepted the offer, met Muzaffar several times, and was eventually arrested during one such visit. Muzaffar Shah briefly annexed Malwa and appointed his brother Nusrat Khan as governor. However, Nusrat’s harsh rule sparked a local rebellion, forcing the Gujarati forces to withdraw. Hoshang Shah was later released and restored to the throne with the help of Muzaffar’s grandson Ahmad Khan. The invasion failed to secure lasting Gujarati control over Malwa.

== Background ==
Dilawar Khan Ghuri, originally appointed governor of Malwa before 1390, gradually consolidated power in the province. When Timur invaded India in 1398, the fugitive Sultan Mahmud Shah II sought refuge in Gujarat but, feeling slighted, moved on to Malwa, where Dilawar received him with full honours. This displeased Dilawar's son Alp Khan, who withdrew to Mandu and began building its fort. After Timur's departure in 1401, Mahmud returned to Delhi, and soon afterward Dilawar encouraged by Alp Khan declared Malwa's independence and assumed royal authority. Upon the death of Dilawar Khan. His son and heir Alp Khan ascended the throne of Malwa in 1406 AD. He adopted the regal title Hoshang Shah. There was a rumor that Hoshang Shah had poisoned his father, Dilawar Khan. Muzaffar Shah of Gujarat seized upon this allegation as a convenient pretext to launch an attack on Malwa. Firishta and Nizam-ud-Din claim that Muzaffar Shah of Gujarat, considered Dilawar Khan as brother-in-arms and was angered by the rumor that Hoshang Shah had poisoned his father. Thus, he invaded Malwa to avenge the alleged crime. Shihab Hakim, however, argues that Muzaffar was a long-standing enemy of Malwa and simply used Dilawar’s death as an opportune moment to strike, when the new ruler was still insecure. The Mirat-i-Sikandari indirectly supports Hakim's view.

== Invasion ==
Towards the end of 1406 CE, Muzaffar Shah invaded the Malwa Sultanate. In 1407 CE, he appeared before the fort of Dhar. Sultan Hoshang Shah received news of the invasion while Muzaffar Shah had reached Ujjain. He hastily assembled whatever forces he could muster and took up a defensive position inside the fort of Dhar. Hoshang Shah then came out of the fort and fought a severe battle against Muzaffar Shah. In the engagement, Muzaffar Shah was wounded and Hoshang Shah himself was dismounted, but Hoshang was ultimately defeated and compelled to retreat and take shelter inside the fort. Muzaffar Shah subsequently laid siege to Dhar, which was well defended by Hoshang Shah's forces. After the siege had continued for some time, Muzaffar Shah realised that capturing the strongly defended fort would be difficult. He therefore resorted to stratagem and opened negotiations for peace. He swore an oath on the Quran and proposed an interview between the two rulers. He claimed that it would elevate his own position through Hoshang's presence and bring benefit to both, thereby reinforcing their friendship. Hoshang Shah summoned a council of his advisers and presented Muzaffar's message for discussion. The courtiers unanimously warned that Muzaffar Shah was unreliable and known for duplicity and breaking promises. They advised holding out patiently, noting that the rainy season was approaching and Muzaffar was far from his territory, which would soon force him to withdraw. In the meantime, they recommended continuing to resist with force. However, Hoshang Shah, believing he could not withstand a prolonged siege, disregarded their advice. Relying on Muzaffar's oath on the Quran, he came out of the fort and met him. Hoshang visited the Gujarati camp several times and returned safely each time, which caused him to lower his guard. On one such occasion, once he was off his guard, Hoshang Shah was arrested and handed over to Muzaffar’s guards.

== Aftermath ==
Muzaffar Shah annexed the Sultanate of Malwa and appointed his brother Nusrat Khan to govern the territory. Nusrat Khan's harsh rule provoked a strong reaction in Malwa. Local soldiers and nobles attacked him near Dhar, forcing him to flee. Fearing Muzaffar Shah's retaliation, the nobles fortified themselves in Mandu, where Hoshang Shah had nearly completed the defences. They elected Musa Khan, Hoshang's cousin, as their leader, and by late 1408 they controlled the fort and were prepared to resist. This effectively ended Gujarat's occupation of Malwa. Hushang Shah was released as situation went out of hands. Muzaffar sent his grandson Ahmad Khan to restore Hushang. Ahmad captured Dhar with ease, restored Hushang Shah on his throne and left for Gujarat.

== See also ==
- Rana Sanga's invasion of Gujarat
- Balban's conquest of Bengal
- Rebellion of Ismail Mukh
- Hoshang Shah's conquest of Kherla

== Bibliography ==
- Majumdar, Ramesh Chandra (1960). The History and Culture of the Indian People. Vol. 6. Bharatiya Vidya Bhavan.
- Day, Upendra Nath (1965). Medieval Malwa: A Political and Cultural History, 1401-1562. Munshi Ram Manohar Lal. ISBN 978-81-215-0401-0.
- Haig, W. (1928). The Cambridge History of India: Turks and Afghans, edited by W. Haig. Vol. III. Cambridge University Press.
- Habib, Mohammad; Nizami, Khaliq Ahmad, eds. (1970). A Comprehensive History of India: The Delhi Sultanat (A.D. 1206-1526). Vol. V. People's Publishing House.
