= Haft Gumbaz =

Group of tombs in Gulbarga, Karnataka, India

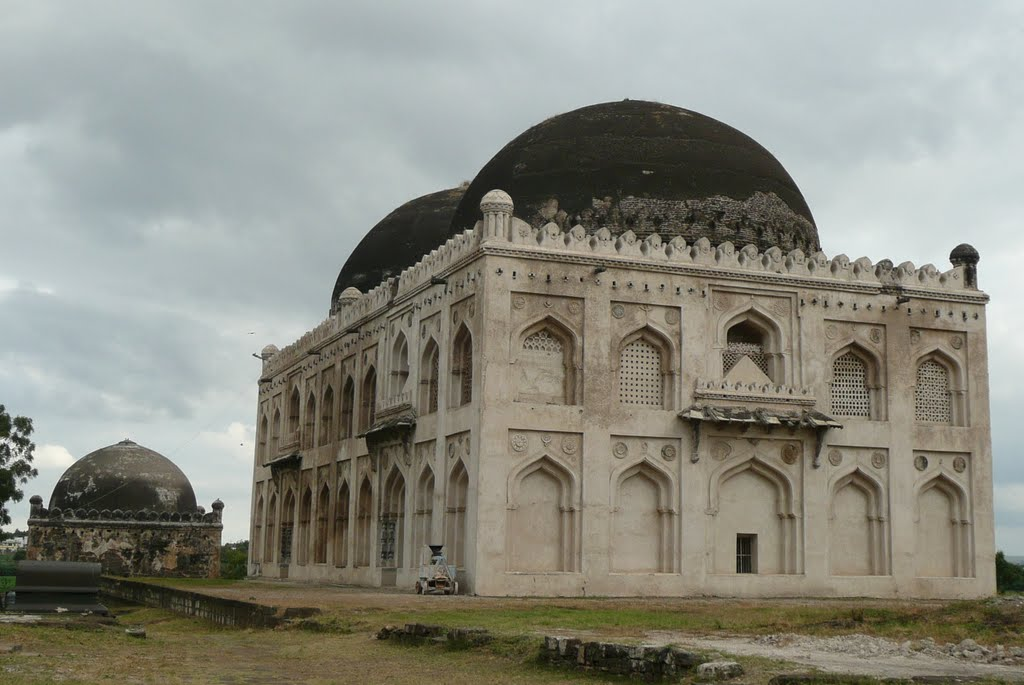
- The tomb of sultan Firuz Shah, the largest of the tombs. An unnamed tomb is also seen in the background.
- Interactive map of Haft Gumbaz
- 17°20′31″N 76°50′43″E
- Location: Gulbarga

History
- Built: 14th and 15th centuries of Bahmani Sultanate

Site notes
- Architectural styles: Indo-Islamic architecture, tomb

The Haft Gumbaz, also spelt Haft Gumbad are a group of tombs of the Bahmani dynasty situated in Gulbarga, in the Indian state of Karnataka. Built during the 14th and 15th centuries, the tombs are examples of early Indo-Islamic architecture. There are seven tombs in total, with four being tombs of the rulers of the Bahmani dynasty. The tomb complex is a monument of national importance, maintained by the Archeological Survey of India. The tomb complex is part of the "Monuments and Forts of the Deccan Sultanate", which is an ensemble of various structures added to the tentative list of the UNESCO World Heritage Sites.

== History ==
The tomb complex was built between the 14th and 15th centuries. The capital shifted to Bidar in 1425, and the later Bahmani sultans are buried in the Bahmani tombs complex in Bidar. The tomb complex has been encroached by local businesses and institutions. A social activist, K.M. Mujeebuddin, has filed an RTI query regarding the upkeep of the tombs.

== Architecture ==
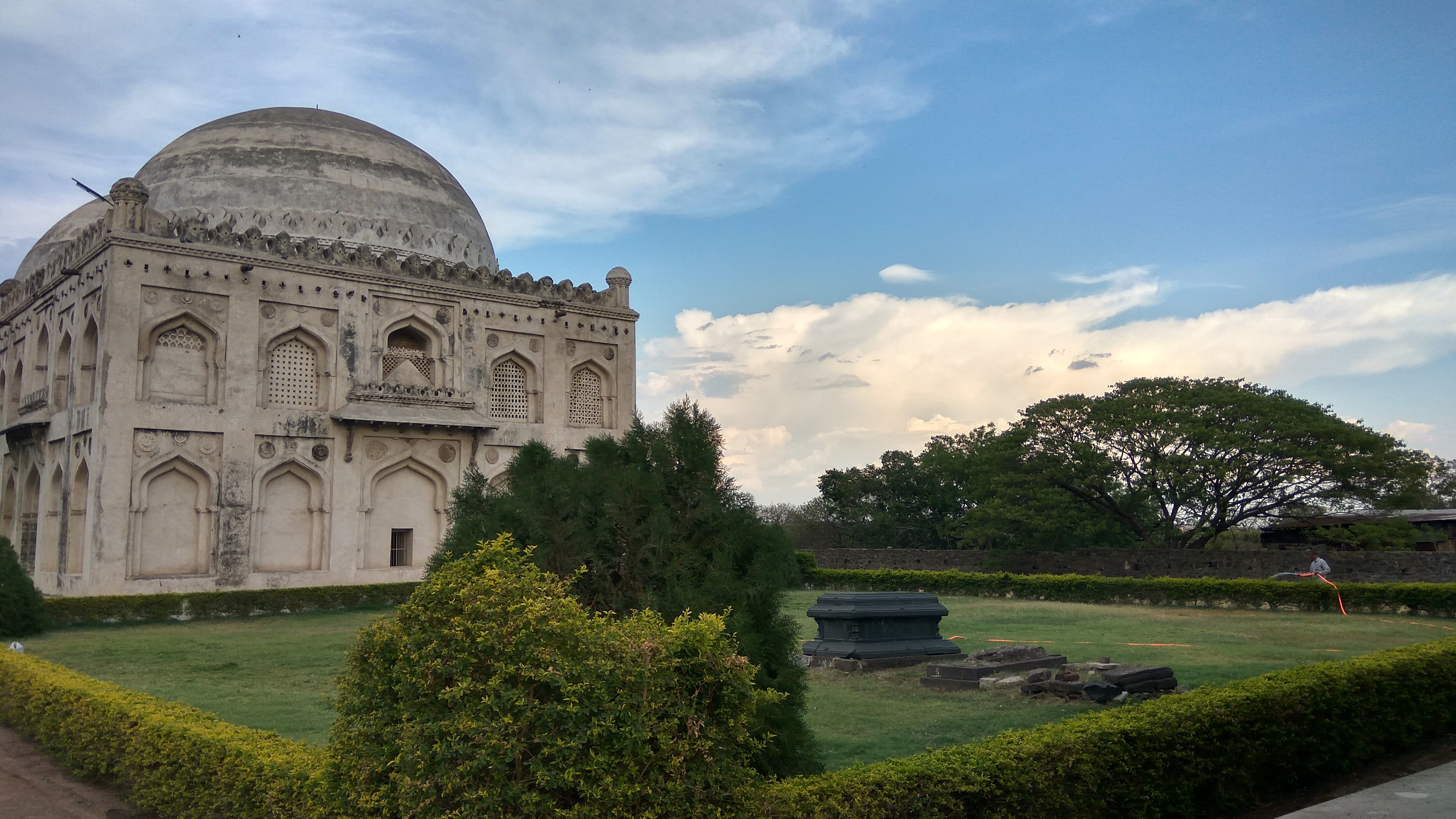
The tombs are situated in a garden

The architectural style is reminiscent of Tughlaq architecture. A unique feature seen only in the Haft Gumbaz is the double-chambered tomb, with one chamber for the king and the other for his family members.

There are seven tombs in total, with four being Sultan's tombs. The tombs are situated in a garden.

=== Tomb of Mujahid Shah ===
This was the first tomb to be built. It is a single-chambered square tomb, free of any elaborate embellishments. It is on the West end of the tomb complex.

=== Tomb of Daud Shah ===
It is a double-chambered tomb.

=== Tomb of Shams al-Din and Ghiyath al-Din ===
The two tombs share the same basement.

=== Tomb of Firuz Shah Bahmani ===
The tomb of Firuz Shah Bahmani is the largest, and is considered the most important of the complex. It is also a double-chambered tomb. The external and internal elevation is divided into two tiers, adorned by double-recessed arches. The arches of the upper tier have jali-style decorations.

== Gallery ==
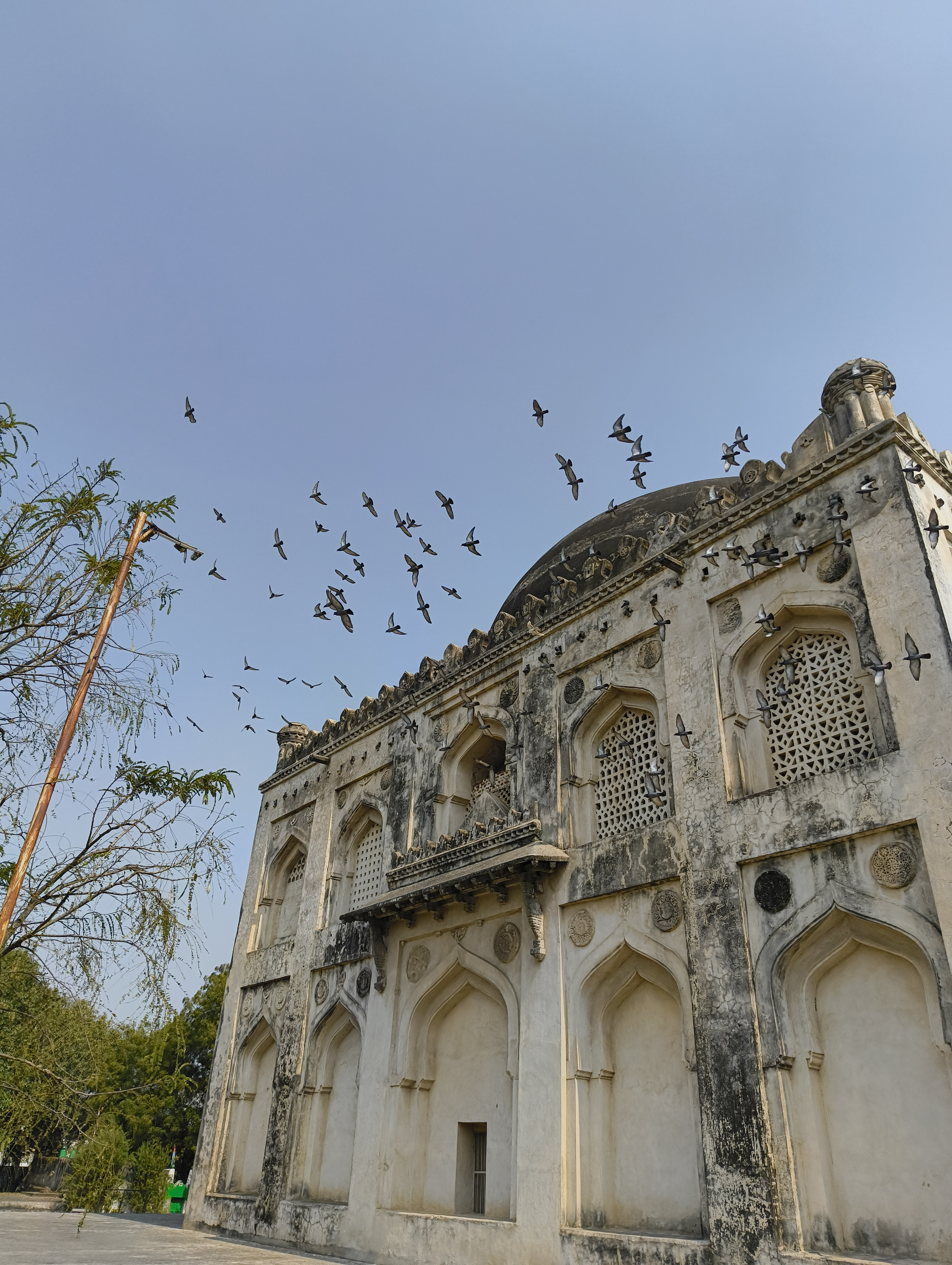
Largest tomb of Haft gumbaz

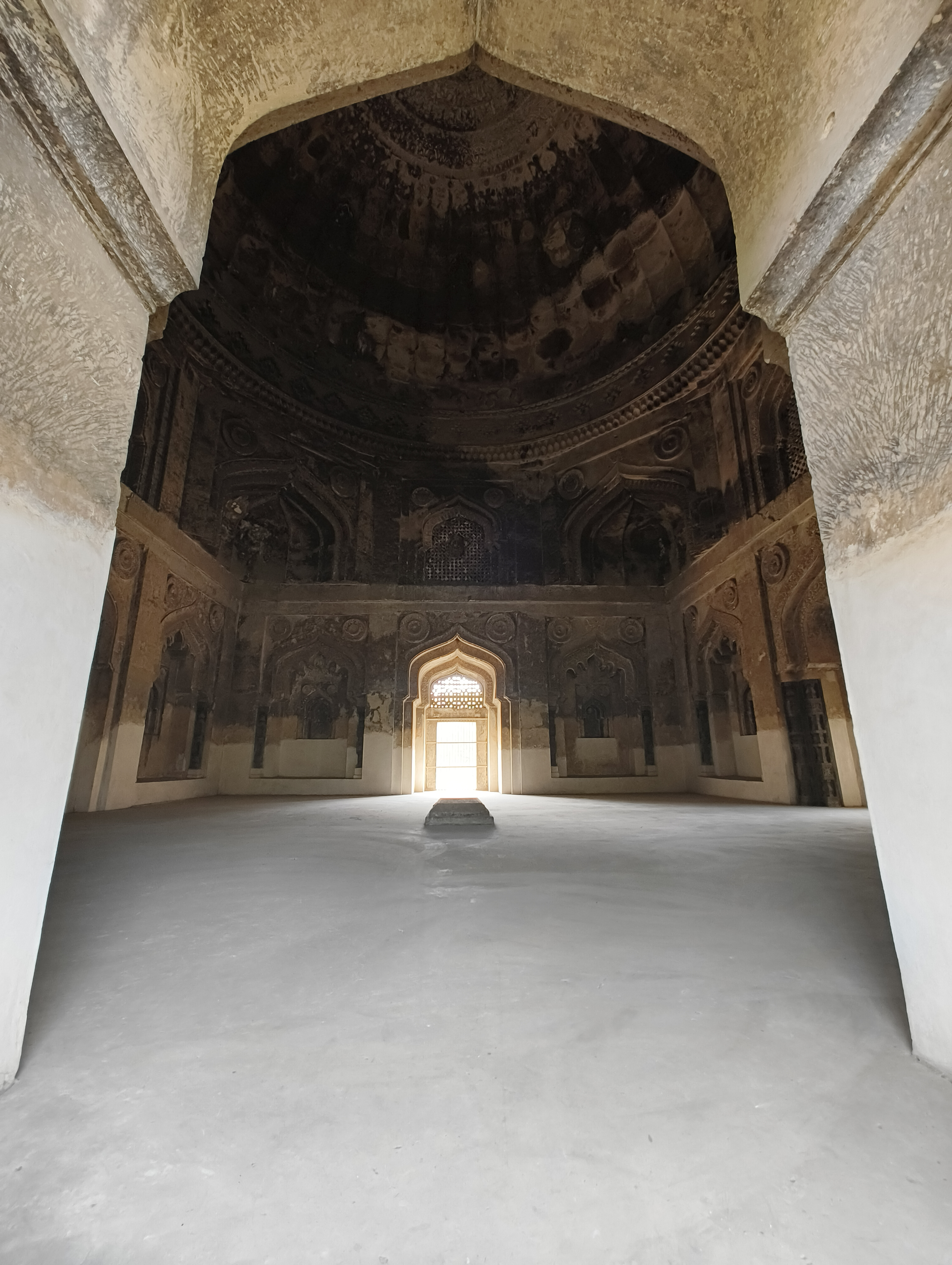
Grave Ghumat tomb

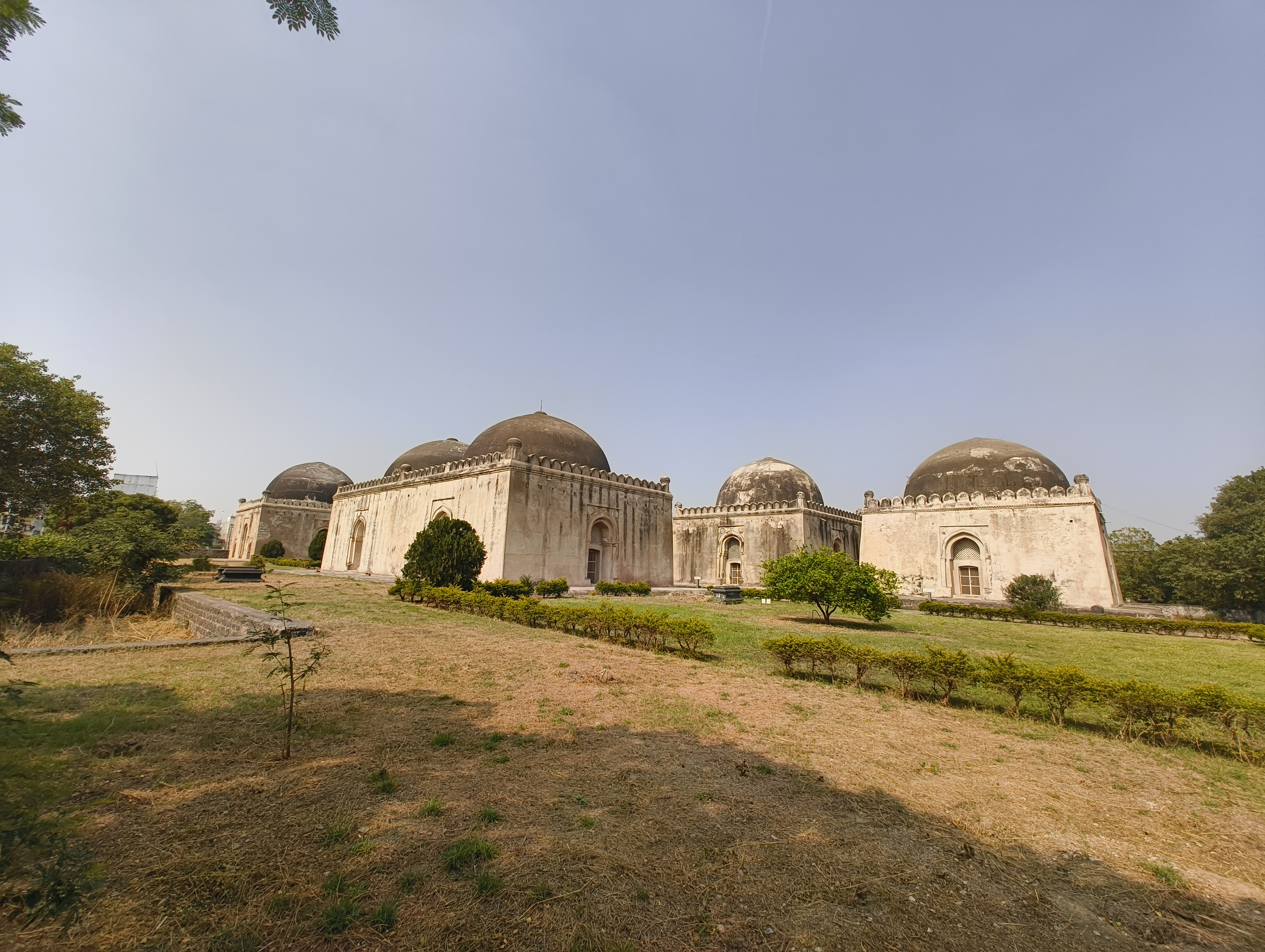
Haft Gumbaz complex

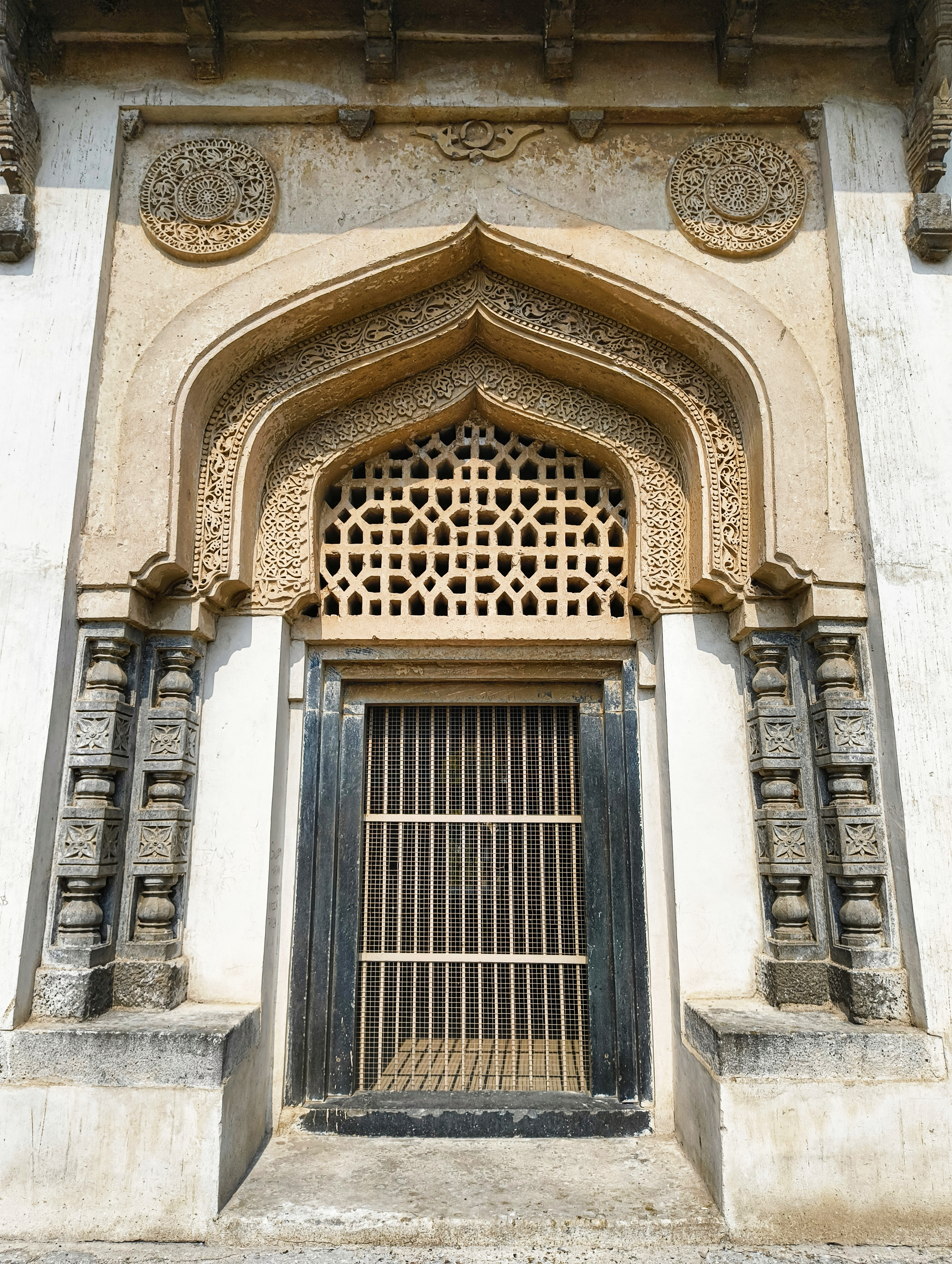
Carving on tomb entrance of Haft gumbaz
