= Firozabad, Karnataka =

Firozabad
- Village
- Ferozabad
- Interactive map of Firozabad
- Coordinates: 17°05′03″N 76°47′25″E

Firozabad, officially known as Ferozabad, is a village in the Kalaburagi district in the Indian state of Karnataka. It is located on the banks of the Bhima river, about 30 km south of the district headquarters at Gulbarga.

== History ==
It was established by Taj-ud-Din Firuz Shah, the ruler of the Bahmani Sultanate in 1398. Firuzabad was intended to be a pleasure resort for the sultan, as well as the secondary capital of the sultanate.

The Bahmani monuments at Firozabad are in need of restoration.

== Demographics ==
According to the 2011 census, the village has a population of 4,748, in 853 households.
