= Kherla kingdom =

Kingdom in Gondwana

The Kherla Kingdom was the earliest kingdom in the Indian region of Gondwana, regarded as one of the four ancient Gond kingdoms. Narsingh Rai was the first king of this dynasty and one of the earliest known Gond rulers. A Rajput dynasty is said to have preceded the Gond rule at Kherla. It was constantly caught between the conflicts of the North Indian Muslim rulers like the rulers of Mandu and the Deccan sultanates. Sources regarding this kingdom are notable nonexistent, unlike the other Gond rulers.

== History ==
A Rajput dynasty was ruling in Kherla before the Gonds. The greatest of those Rajput rulers was named Jaitpal, who is credited with building the fortress of Kherla. Jaitpal was succeeded by Narsingh Rai, the first Gond ruler of Kherla. During his reign, the kingdom stretched in a westerly direction to the hills north of Berar, including the fortress of Gawilghur. His reign was marked by constant warfare with the Muslim rulers to his north and south.
