= Taj ud-Din Firuz Shah =

Sultan of the Bahmani Sultanate from 1397 to 1422

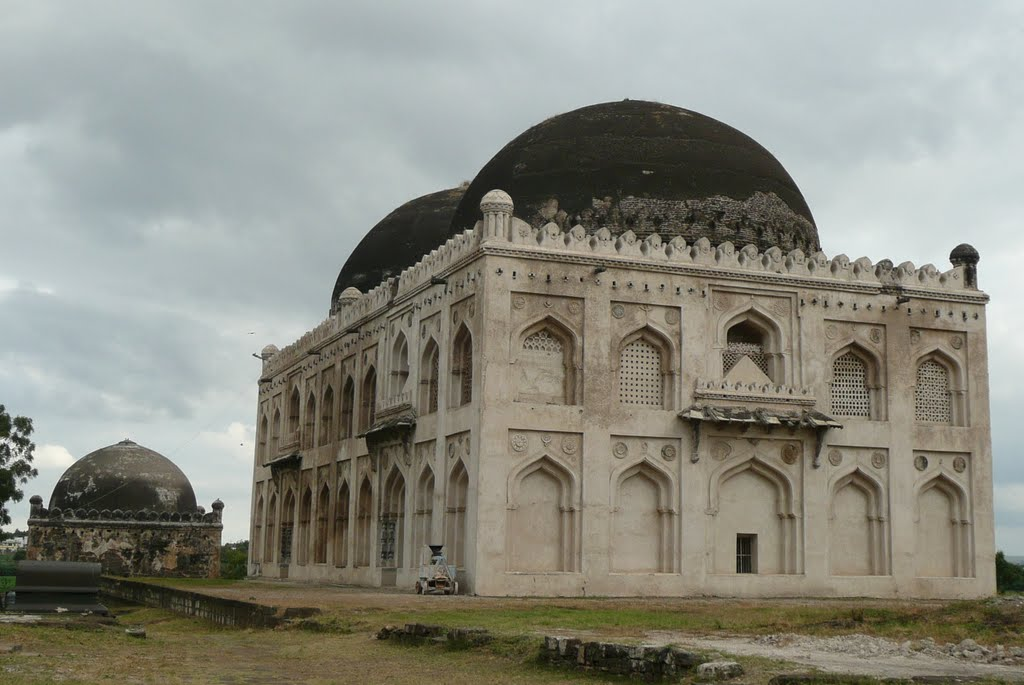

8th Bahmani Sultan
- Reign: 16 November 1397 – 22 September 1422
- Predecessor: Shams-ud-Din Shah
- Successor: Ahmad Shah I Wali
- Died: 1 October 1422
- Burial: Haft Gumbaz
- Spouse: Daughter of Muhammad Shah II Bahmani; Daughter of Narsingh Rai of Kherla; Daughter of Deva Raya I of Vijaynagar
- Issue: Hasan Khan; Mubarak Khan

Taj ud-Din Firoz Shah (died 1 October 1422), also known as Firoz Shah Bahmani, was the ruler of the Bahmani Sultanate in the Deccan Plateau of India from 16 November 1397 to 22 September 1422. Firuz Shah is considered an important ruler of the Bahamani Sultanate. He expanded his kingdom and even succeeded in conquering the Raichur Doab from Vijaynagara kingdoms.

Firuz Shah fought against the Vijayanagara Empire on many occasions and the rivalry between the two dynasties continued unabated throughout his reign, with victories in 1398 and 1406, but a defeat in 1419.

== Early life and background ==
He was a son of Daud Shah, the fourth sultan, and a grandson of Ala-ud-Din Bahman Shah, the first sultan. He, along with his brother Ahmad, was raised by Muhammad Shah II. Muhammad II married his daughters off to the two brothers. Firuz was deemed the heir presumptive to the throne.

After the birth of Ghiyas-ud-din, Muhammad deemed him the successor to the throne. Firuz swore fealty to the new sultan. However, Ghiyas-ud-din was blinded and imprisoned by a Turkish nobleman who installed Shams-ud-din as a puppet ruler. Firuz and Ahmed marched to Gulbarga and Firuz declared himself the sultan. Taghalchin was killed and Shams-ud-din was blinded.

== Reign ==
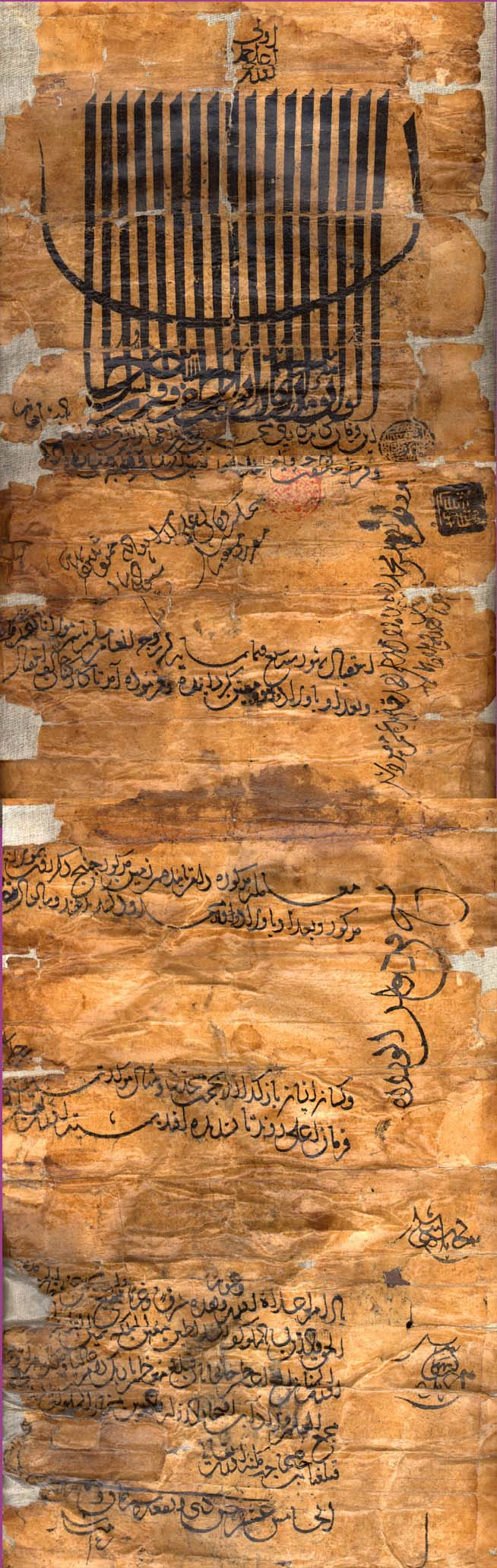
Taj ud-Din Firuz Shah of the Bahmani Sultanate's Firman.

At the beginning of his reign, Harihara II of the Vijayanagar Empire had advanced as far as the Raichur Doab and posed a threat to the Bahmanis. This threat was thwarted by a calculated and incisive attack by Firuz.

In 1406, he defeated the Vijayanagara Empire. A peace treaty was signed and the daughter of Deva Raya was married off to him.

During his reign, Firuz was successful in integrating Hindus into the Bahmani office and army. He also formed alliances with Telugu warriors.

He was determined to make the Deccan region the cultural centre of India. Each year he sent ships from his kingdom's two principal western seaports, Goa and Dabhol, to the Persian Gulf to recruit talented men of letters, administrators, soldiers, and artisans.

=== Expedition to Kherla and construction of Firozabad ===
Firuz led a successful expedition against Narsingh Rai of Kherla who had to surrender forty elephants and married his daughter to Firuz.

During the period of peace following the expedition, Firuz embarked on building a new city which was named Firozabad, a few kilometers south of Gulbarga.

=== War of the Goldsmith's Daughter ===
In 1406, Deva Raya I of the Vijayanagara empire attempted to kidnap a daughter of a Goldsmith from Mudgal due to the rejection of the marriage proposal. He marched with his army to the Bahmani territories where the Goldsmith and his family took refuge. Knowing this, Firuz Shah with his allies marched to Vijayanagar and plundered their territories. Atlast, Deva Raya sued for peace and was forced to give his daughter for marriage to Firuz Shah.

=== Defeat at Pangal and later rule ===
In 1420, an attack on Pangal, which had been taken by Vijayanagar, proved disastrous. Firuz was trounced by Vijayanagar and he retreated, surrendering the southern and eastern districts of his kingdom. This defeat had a deep impact on his morale and he was henceforth a broken man. He spend his final two years in asceticism and piety. The administration of the kingdom was delegated to two manumitted slaves, Hushyar and Bidar, who were given the titles of 'Ain-ul-mulk and Nizam-ul-mulk.

=== Succession ===
In 1422, Firuz, on the advice of Hushyar and Bidar, ordered Ahmad to be blinded, in order to secure the succession for his eldest son Hasan Khan. Ahmad, along with his son Alauddin and his supporters, fled the capital and was pursued by a force of three or four thousand horse, led by Hushyar and Bidar. In the ensuing battle, Ahmad's army defeated the army of Hushyar and Bidar, as they fell back to Gulbarga with Ahmad in pursuit.

As Ahmad laid siege to Gulbarga, Firuz, now extremely ill, was carried to the battlefield. Rumours of his death caused many in his army to defect to Ahmad's camp. The citadel was surrendered and Firuz abdicated in favour of Ahmad.

== Death and burial ==
Firuz Shah died on 1 October 1422 in Gulbarga. He was buried in a large tomb in the Haft Gumbaz, that was constructed during his lifetime.

== Family ==
=== Wives ===
Firuz Shah had married the daughter of his patron, Muhammad Shah II Bahmani. He had taken a daughter of Narsingh Rai of Kherla in his harem after an expedition against Kherla. After the War of the Goldsmith's Daughter, he also married a daughter of Deva Raya I of Vijaynagar.

Alongside his wives, Firuz is known to have many concubines from different races all over the world, and had built a large city on the hanks of the Bhima river for housing his vast harem, which had "very wide and straight roads and fine shops and bazars, and brought the waters of the river right inside the palace." Firuz reportedly also read Old and New Testament for satisfying his Christian and Jewish concubines. However, his chief wife was Muhammad Shah II's daughter, who was designated as Queen of the Deccan and presided over the harem.

=== Issue ===
Firuz Shah is known to have at least two sons and one daughter:

- Hasan Khan, his oldest son, whom he originally had appointed heir apparent. After Ahmad Shah's ascension, Hasan Khan was spared by his uncle, and was allowed to live in luxury in his jagir in Firozabad throughout his reign. However, upon the ascension of his cousin Alauddin Ahmad Shah, Hasan Khan was blinded.
- Mubarak Khan. His daughter, Nargis Begum married Humayun Shah Bahmani, the grandson of Ahmad Shah I Wali, and all following sultans of the Bahmani dynasty were maternal descendants of Firuz Shah through this marriage.
- A daughter, married Shamsuddin Muhammad Inju.

== Personality ==
Firuz Shah was particularly an intellectual king. He was compared to Muhammad Tughluk in this aspect. He was well versed in Quran and Islamic jurisprudence, took philosophical leanings in Sufism and proficient in several languages and took three days off in a week to give lectures on subjects like mathematics and Euclidean geometry. He was also a master of several languages like Persian, Arabic, Kannada, Telugu, Marathi and many other languages. He also was poet and wrote under the name of Firozi. His interest in astronomy is quite evident when he instructs to build an observatory in Daulatabad which would get completed after his death. He was also respectful of other faiths, and read the Christian and Jewish scriptures. He also maintained a vast harem consisting of inmates from different parts of the world. He would also contract temporary marriages known in the Shi'ah doctrine as mutāh so as to not conflict with his strict Islamic observerence.

== Bibliography ==
- Sherwani, H K, ed. (1946). The Bahmanis of Deccan, An objective study. Saood Manzil Limited.
- Eaton, Richard Maxwell (2000). A Social History of the Deccan, 1300–1761: Eight Indian Lives. ISBN 978-1-139-05390-7. OCLC 921054505.
- Haig, Wolseley (20 April 2024). The Cambridge History Of India Vol. 2. Cambridge University Press.
