= Narsingh Rai =

Ruler of the Gond

- Gond Raja

Gond Raja of Kherla kingdom
- Reign: 1398–1433
- Predecessor: Jaitpal
- Successor: Kosal Rai
- Died: 1433; Kherla
- Cause of death: Killed in action
- Issue: Kosai Rai; Gopal Rai; Chandji; Khemji
- Dynasty: Kherla dynasty
- Father: Jaitpal
- Religion: Hinduism

Narsingh Rai was a powerful fourteenth-century ruler of the Gond in central India. He was a clever and ambitious king of Kherla kingdom, succeeding a Gond ruler called Jaitpal. He was defeated by Firuz Shah Bahmani and later Kherla was restored to him. A daughter of Narsing Rai was also married to Firuz Shah Bahmani.

He is the first ruler reported to have unified the Gond.

== Reign ==
A Rajput dynasty was ruling in Kherla before the Gonds. The greatest of those Rajput rulers was named Jaitpal, who is credited with building the fortress of Kherla. Jaitpal was succeeded by Narsingh Rai, the first Gond ruler of Kherla. During his reign, the kingdom stretched in a westerly direction to the hills north of Berar, including the fortress of Gawilghur. His reign was marked by constant warfare with the Muslim rulers to his north and south.

=== War with the Bahmani Sultanate and subsequent annexation of Kherla ===
Firuz Shah Bahmani, the ruler of the Bahmani Sultanate, invaded his domain and laid siege to the fortress of Kherla. He captured Narsingh Rai's eldest son and the Gond ruler, with his power reduced, went to Firuz Shah Bahmani's camp at Ellichpur with his family. He showed remorse for his actions, and was recognized as the Bahmani Sultan's vassal. He was to pay a fixed tribute every year and one of his daughters was married into Firuz Shah's harem to solidify the peace between the realms. Rather than being stripped of his power and honour, Narsingh was later elevated to the position of amir (noble) within the Bahmani Sultanate, and remained a loyal member of the Sultanate's ruling class.

=== War with Mandu ===
As a consequence of his alliance with the Bahmani Sultanate, Hoshang Shah, the ruler of Malwa Sultanate became hostile towards Narsingh Rai. Hoshang Shah repeatedly attempted to take Kherla as his invitation of alliance had been refused by Narsingh Rai. For a brief period the tables were turned as the Gond king pursued Hoshang's army when they were retreating across the hilly country of Kherla from an unsuccessful campaign in the Deccan and slaughtered the soldiers. Next, when Ahmad Shah, the Bahmani ruler and Narsingh Rai's ally was campaigning in Gujarat, Hoshang jumped upon this opportunity and attacked Kherla once again. In the following battle, Narsingh Rai was slain and Kherla remained in the Malwa sultan's control for some time.
