= Ahmad Shah I Wali =

Sultan of the Bahmani Sultanate from 1422 to 1436

Ahmad Shah I Bahmani
- Wali
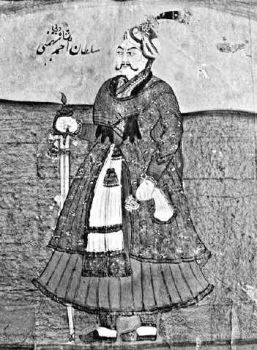

9th Bahmani Sultan
- Reign: 1 October 1422 – 17 April 1436
- Predecessor: Taj ud-Din Firuz Shah
- Successor: ‘Alau’d-din Ahmad Shah
- Born: 1371
- Burial: Bahmani tombs, Bidar
- Spouse: Daughter of Muhammad Shah II Bahmani; Shah Jahan Begum
- Issue: ‘Alau’d-din Ahmad Shah; Mahmud Khan; Muhammad Sultan; Daud Khan; Hasan Khan; Agha Zainab; Two more daughters
- Religion: Shia Islam

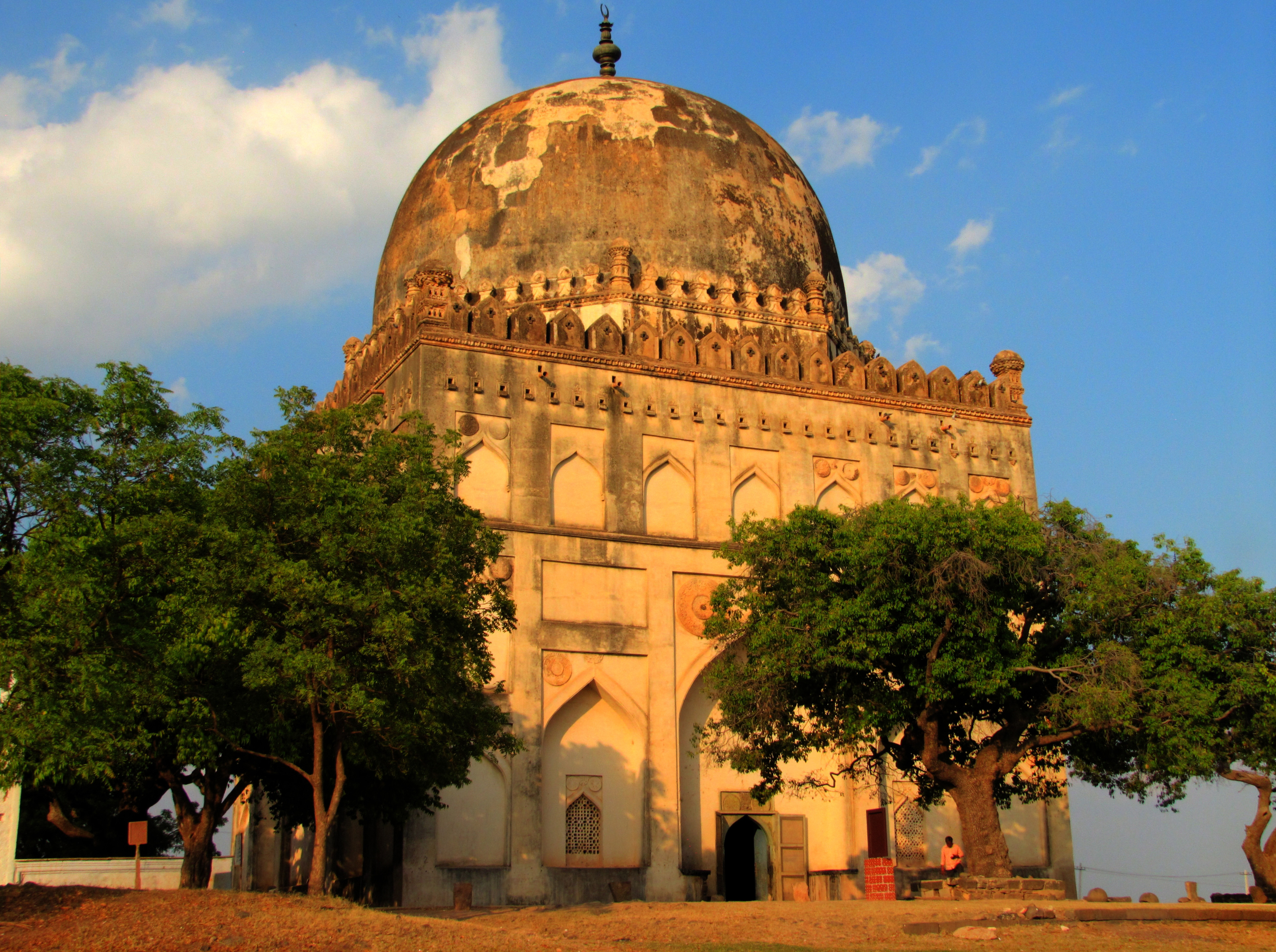
Tomb of Sultan Ahmed Shah Al Wali

Shihab-ud-Din Ahmad Shah I Bahmani, also known as Ahmad Shah Wali (lit. 'saint'), was the Sultan of the Bahmani Sultanate from 1 October 1422 to 17 April 1436, and was a great patron of arts and culture. He brought Persian artisans from Iran, including the metal-worker Abdulla-bin-Kaiser, who was the master of Bidriware, the inlaying of zinc alloy with silver and gold.

== Early life ==
Ahmed Shah was the son of Daud Shah Bahmani and the grandson of Alauddin Bahman Shah. He was born sometime around 1371. He, along with his brother Firuz, was raised by Muhammad Shah II. The brothers were married to the daughters of Muhammad Shah II.

=== Accession of Firuz and killing of Taghalchin ===
After the birth of Ghiyas-ud-din, Muhammad deemed him the successor to the throne. However, Ghiyas-ud-din was blinded and imprisoned by a Turkish nobleman, Taghalchin, who installed Shams-ud-din as a puppet ruler. Firuz and Ahmed, marched to Gulbarga and Firuz declared himself the new sultan.

On November 15, 1397, Firuz and Ahmed entered the palace with a few armed men on the pretext of paying their respects to the new king. They overpowered the king as well as Taghalchin, and Firuz ascended the turquoise throne, assuming the title of Taj-ud-din Firuz Shah.

=== During Firuz Shah's reign ===
After Firuz ascended the throne, he made Ahmad a minister and awarded him the titles of Amir al-umara.

=== Rebellion against Firuz ===
In 1422, Firuz ordered Ahmad to be blinded, in order to secure the succession for his eldest son Hasan Khan. Ahmad, along with his son Alauddin and his supporters, fled the capital and was pursued by a force of three or four thousand horse, led by Hushyar and Bidar. In the ensuing battle, Ahmad's army defeated the army of Hushyar and Bidar, as they fell back to Gulbarga with Ahmad in pursuit.

As Ahmad laid siege to Gulbarga, Firuz, now extremely ill, was carried to the battlefield. Rumours of his death caused many in his army to defect to Ahmad's camp. The citadel was surrendered and Firuz abdicated in favour of Ahmad.

== Reign ==
=== Conquest of Mahur ===
In 1426, three successive campaigns were taken against the Raja of Mahur, leading to its annexation by 1427 AD. Historical accounts of Ahmad Shah’s Mahur campaign differ. While Nizamuddin Ahmad claims the Rai of Mahur submitted and became a loyal follower, Firishta and Tabataba illustrates a different story stating that even after the Rai gave up, the Sultan broke his word and massacred him along with his followers. Firistha says Ahmad also took the fort of Kullum or Kalan and a diamond mine from the ruler of Gondwana. Mahur was put incharge of Shahzada Mahmud Khan. The fort of Gawil was restored for further expeditions on the north.

In 1432, the Bahmani capital shifted to Bidar, and Khwaja Bandenawaz (d. 1422), the most well-known Sufi of the Deccan, is supposed to have been one of the causes for this. The Bahmani kings had close ties with Sufi saints, and Ahmed Shah continued the tradition but he was also considered a saint; the only king to be treated as such by his followers. His tomb in the funerary complex of Ashtur, just outside Bidar, is venerated by Muslims, who consider him to be a wali (friend of God). Ahmed Shah's tomb has well-preserved murals and verses from the Quran. Frontline

Ahmed Shah fought battles against Vijayanagar (1423), Warangal (1424–1425), Malwa (1425–1435), and against Gujarat (1425–1435).

== Death ==
Ahmad Shah died in 1435. (Note: The exact date of Ahmad's death is not known. The dates given by the most reliable sources range between February 18 and February 27, 1435.) Ahmad and his empress's, tomb is located in Ashtur village, Bidar District, and is the subject of an annual urs, or anniversary of death festival.

== Beliefs ==
In 1429 Ahmad Shah Wali Bahmani converted to Shi'ism. He was religiously inclined and fond of Sufi saints. He is referred to by the title Wali.

== Issue ==
Ahmad Shah I is known to have at least five sons and three daughters:

- Jafar Khan, who eventually succeeded his father as Alau'd-din Ahmad Shah
- Mahmud Khan, who served as governor of Mahur, Kullam and Ramgiri.
- Muhammad Sultan, who was a favorite of his father. He served as co-regent with his oldest brother during the last year of his father's reign. Bidar was named Muhammadabad after him. Although he rebelled against his brother, he was pardoned and later was given the jagir of Rajachal.
- Dawud Khan, who served as govennor of Telengana. He died soon after his father in 1436.
- Hasan Khan
- A daughter, married Shah Nurullah, a grandson of Shah Nimatullah Wali
- A daughter, married Shah Habibullah, another relative of Shah Nimatullah Wali
- A daughter, married Jalal Khan, who later rebelled against his brother-in-law, Alauddin Ahmad Shah.

== Bibliography ==
- Day, Upendra Nath (1965). Medieval Malwa: A Political and Cultural History, 1401-1562. Munshi Ram Manohar Lal. ISBN 978-81-215-0401-0.
- Yazdani, Ghulam (1947). Bidar, Its History and Monuments.
- Haig, Wolseley (1925). The Cambridge History Of India Vol. 2. Cambridge University Press.
- Sherwani, Haroon Khan (1954). The Bahmanis of the Deccan. Hyderabad: The Manager of Publications.
- Khalidi, Umar (1990). "The Shiʿites of the Deccan: An Introduction". Rivista degli studi orientali. 64 (1/2). [Fabrizio Serra Editore, Sapienza - Universita di Roma]: 5–16. ISSN 0392-4866.
