= Mandav =

- Town
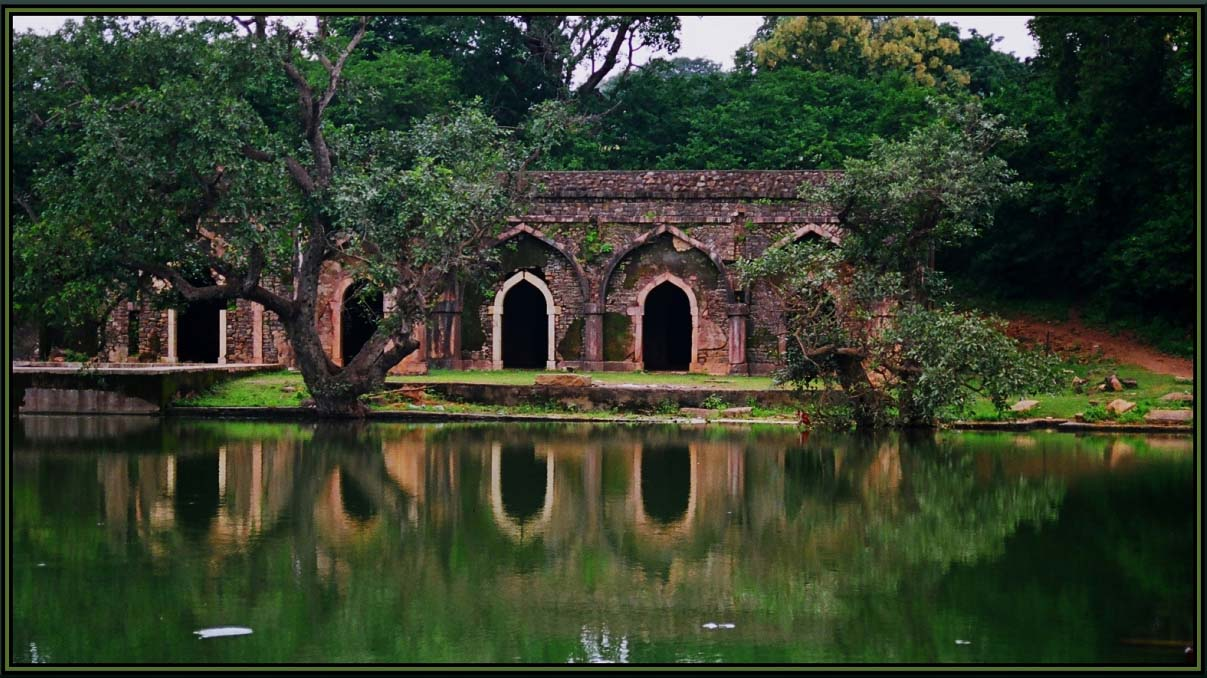
- Reva Lake at Mandav, Dhar district (MP)

- Location in Madhya Pradesh, India Mandav (India)
- Coordinates: 22°20′11″N 75°24′56″E
- Country: India
- State: Madhya Pradesh
- District: Dhar

Population (2001)
  - Total: 8,545

Languages
  - Official: Hindi
- Time zone: UTC+5:30 (IST)

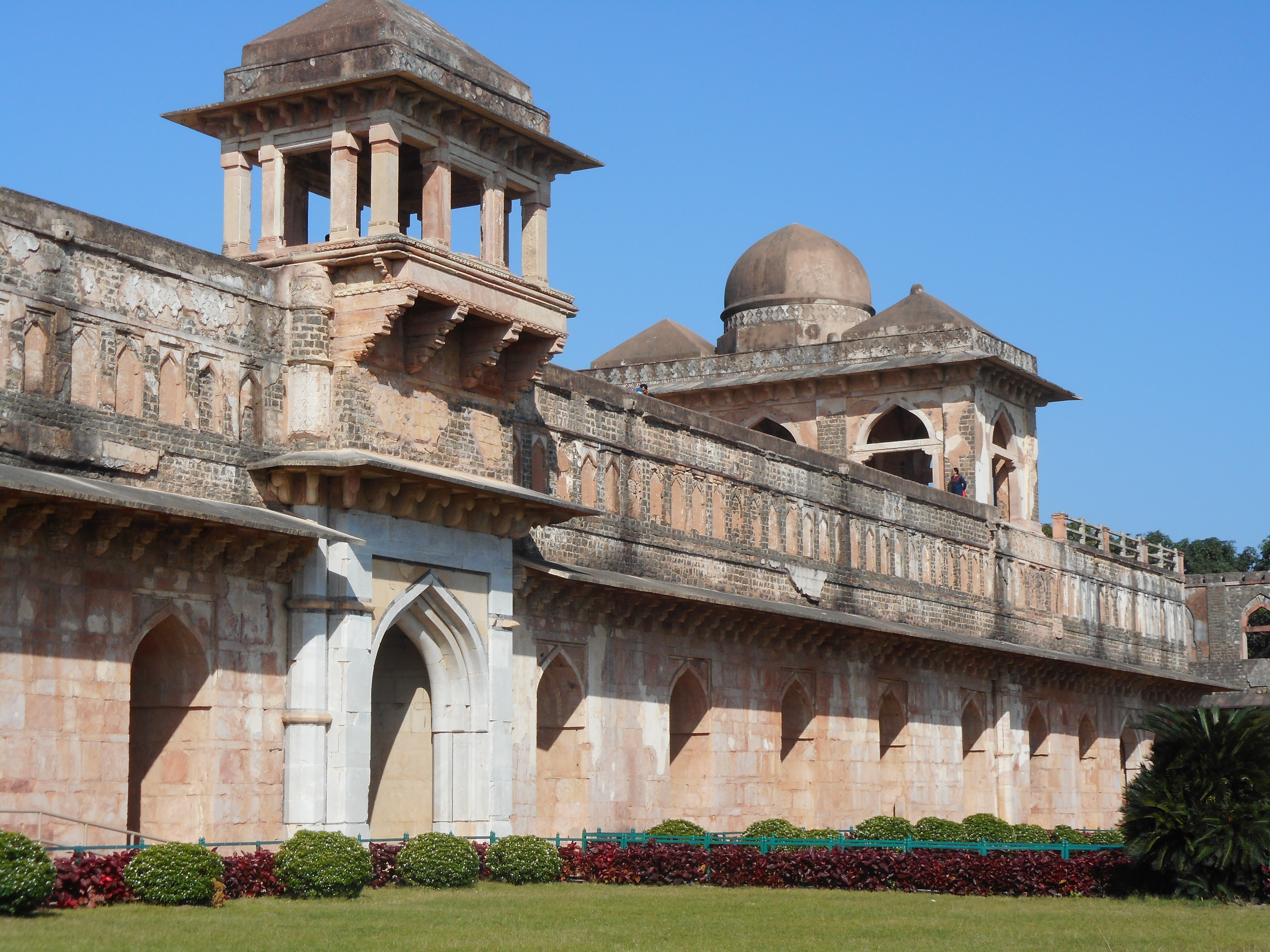
The Iconic Jahaz Mahal at Mandav, Dhar district, Madhya Pradesh, India

Mandav is a town and a nagar panchayat, near city of Dhar in Dhar district in the Indian state of Madhya Pradesh.

== Demographics ==
As of 2001 India census, Mandav had a population of 8,545. Males constitute 51% of the population and females 49%. Mandav has an average literacy rate of 32%, lower than the national average of 59.5%: male literacy is 41%, and female literacy is 22%. In Mandav, 20% of the population is under 6 years of age.

Mandav is situated in the Vindhyachal Range at 2,000 feet above sea level. There is a deep ravine that separates it from the Malwa Plateau in Central India. Mandav is 100 km from Indore, the nearest airport.

== History ==
The history of Mandav, also known as Mandu, dates back to the Paramara period in the 8th century A.D. Later, it was under Mughal rule. They called it Shadiabad, which means ‘The City of Joy’. The monuments are a mix of Hindu and Afghan architectural styles.

Mandu is associated with the relationship between Sultan Baz Bahadur and his consort, Rani Roopmati., whose romance became the subject of songs and ballads in the Malwa region. Roopmati's Pavilion, located on a hill overlooking Baz Bahadur's Palace, is traditionally associated with the couple. Baz Bahadur's Palace is an example of Afghan-influenced architecture.

Under Mughal rule, Mandu was a pleasure resort, its lakes and palaces the scenes of festivities.

== Places of interest ==
This article needs to merge with Mandu, Madhya Pradesh#Places of interest There are a number of monuments in Mandav. Among the most important are:

=== Shri Mandavagadh Teerth ===
Shri Mandavagadh Teerth is dedicated to the Lord Suparshvanatha. It belongs to the Shwetambar sect of Jainism. The temple has been attractively constructed and looks exquisite. It underwent expansion in the 14th century. The idol of Lord Suparshvanath is believed to be much older. The idol is white in complexion and is 91.54 cm (3 feet) in height. It is seated in a padmansana posture. Apart from this in this same fort there is a fine temple of smaller size of Lord Shantinath. Ruins of many temples and idols can be seen here. As per a reference once there were almost 700 Jain temples here.

=== The Delhi Darwaja and Hoshang Shah tomb ===
The Delhi Darwaja is one of the twelve gateways to the city and is made up of reddish stone. The Hoshang Shah's tomb is a fine example of Afghan-style architecture. It is said that four architects from Shah Jahan's court visited Mandu and took inspiration for the Taj Mahal.

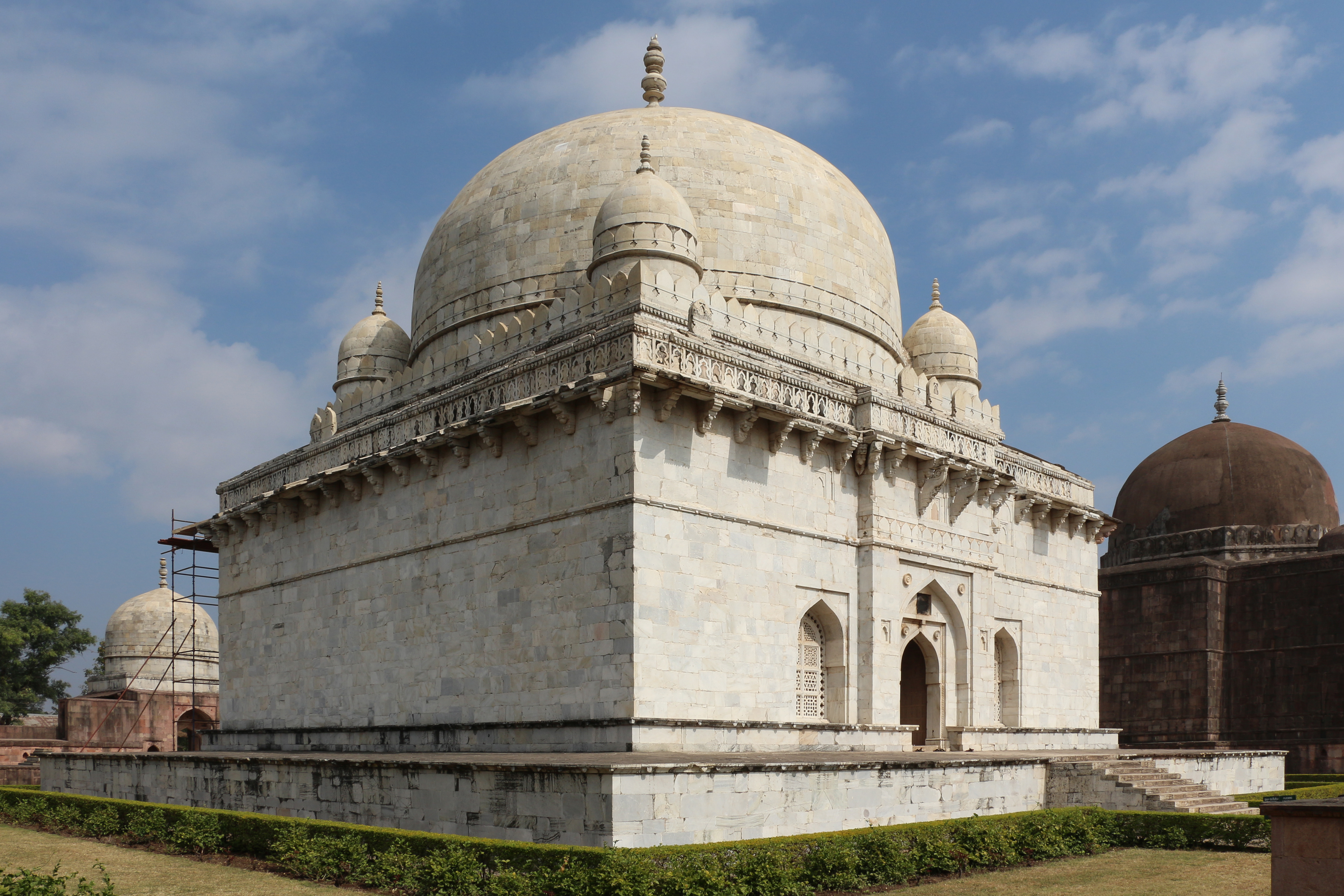
Hoshang Shah's Tomb

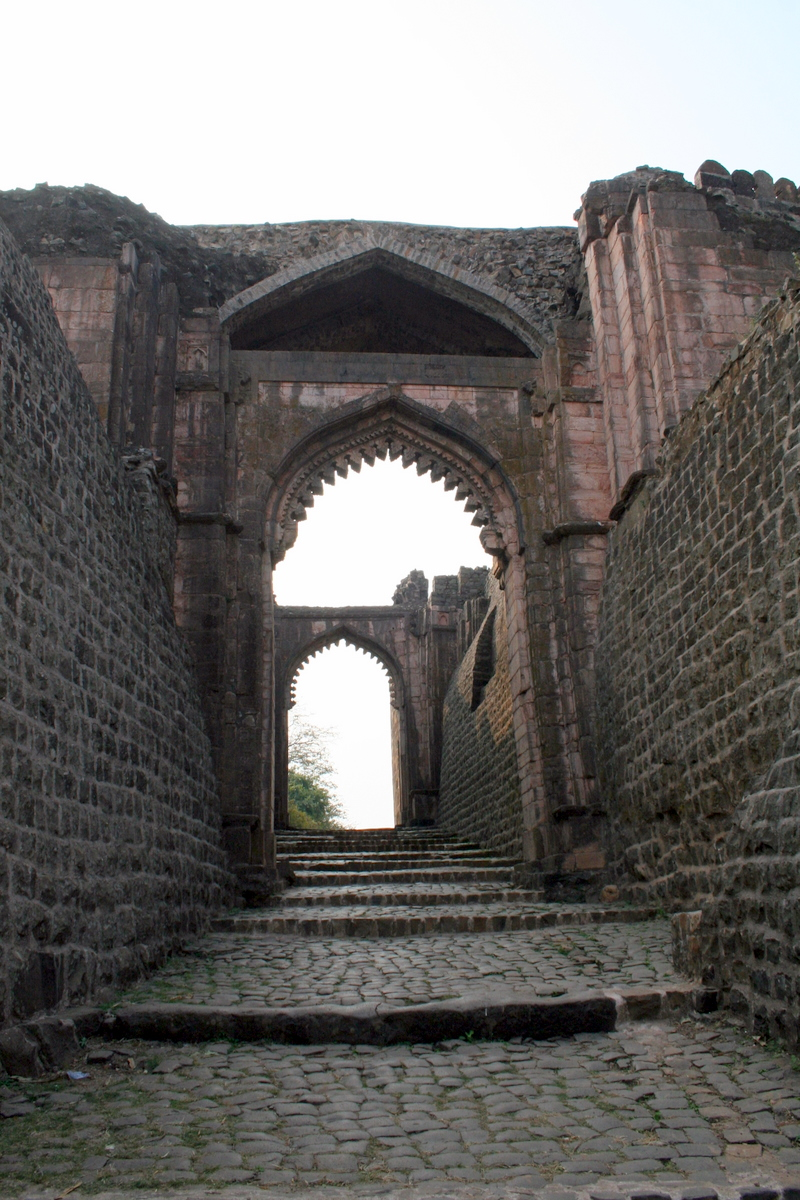
Delhi Darwaja

=== The Jahaz Mahal and Hindola Mahal ===
The Jahaz Mahal, or the ship palace, resembles a ship sailing in water. There are two lakes, Kapur Talao and the Munja Talao, at the front of and behind the monument. The beautiful reflection of the palace can be seen in the tank waters. This was built in the period of Sultan Ghiyas-ud-din Khilji as a pleasure resort for his large harem.

The Hindola Mahal or the Swing Palace has been built with sloping walls, which make it look like a swing. This was used as an audience hall. There is a step well called Champa Baoli near it, which was connected to underground rooms with arrangements for cold and hot water for bathing.

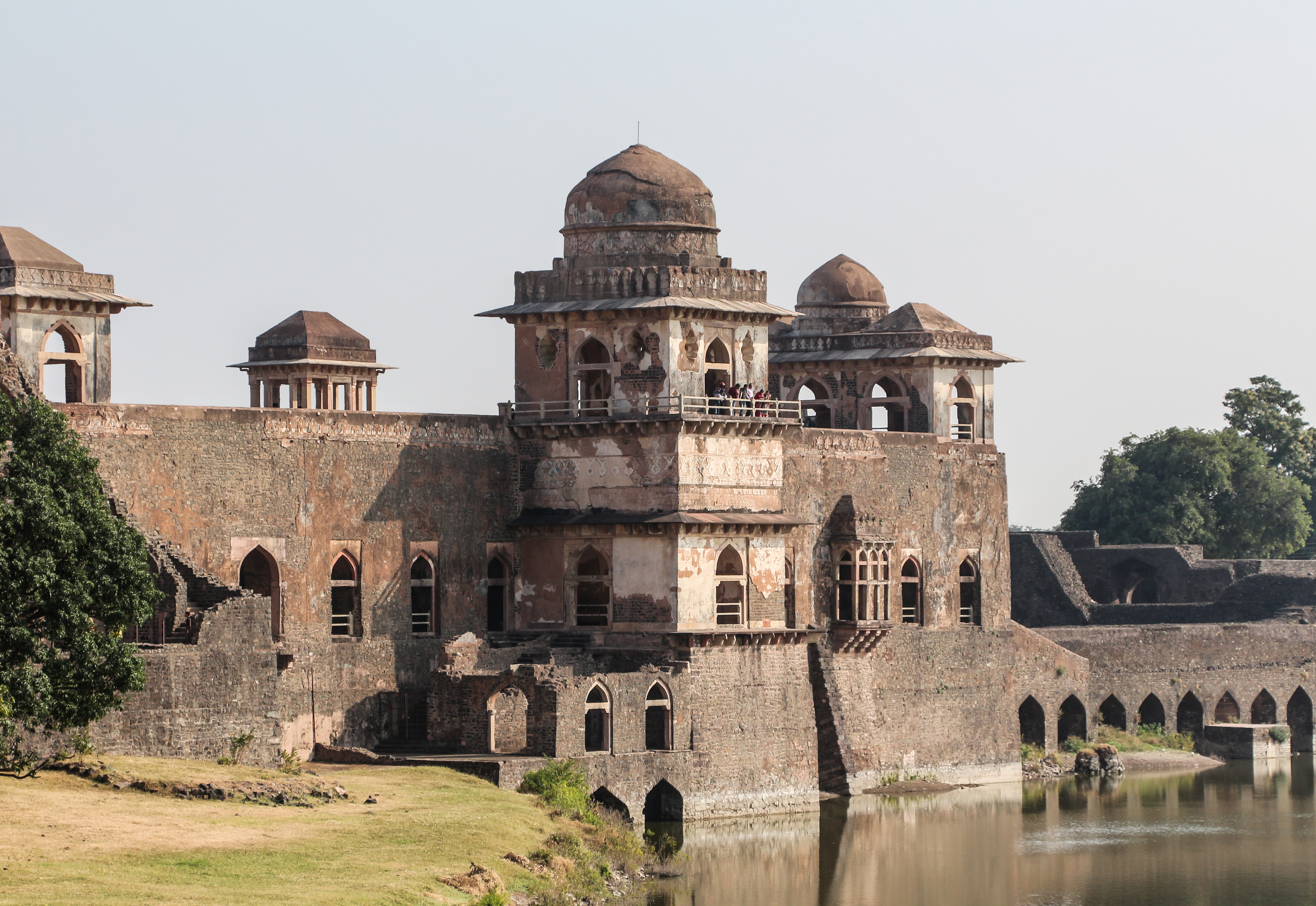
Jahaz Mahal

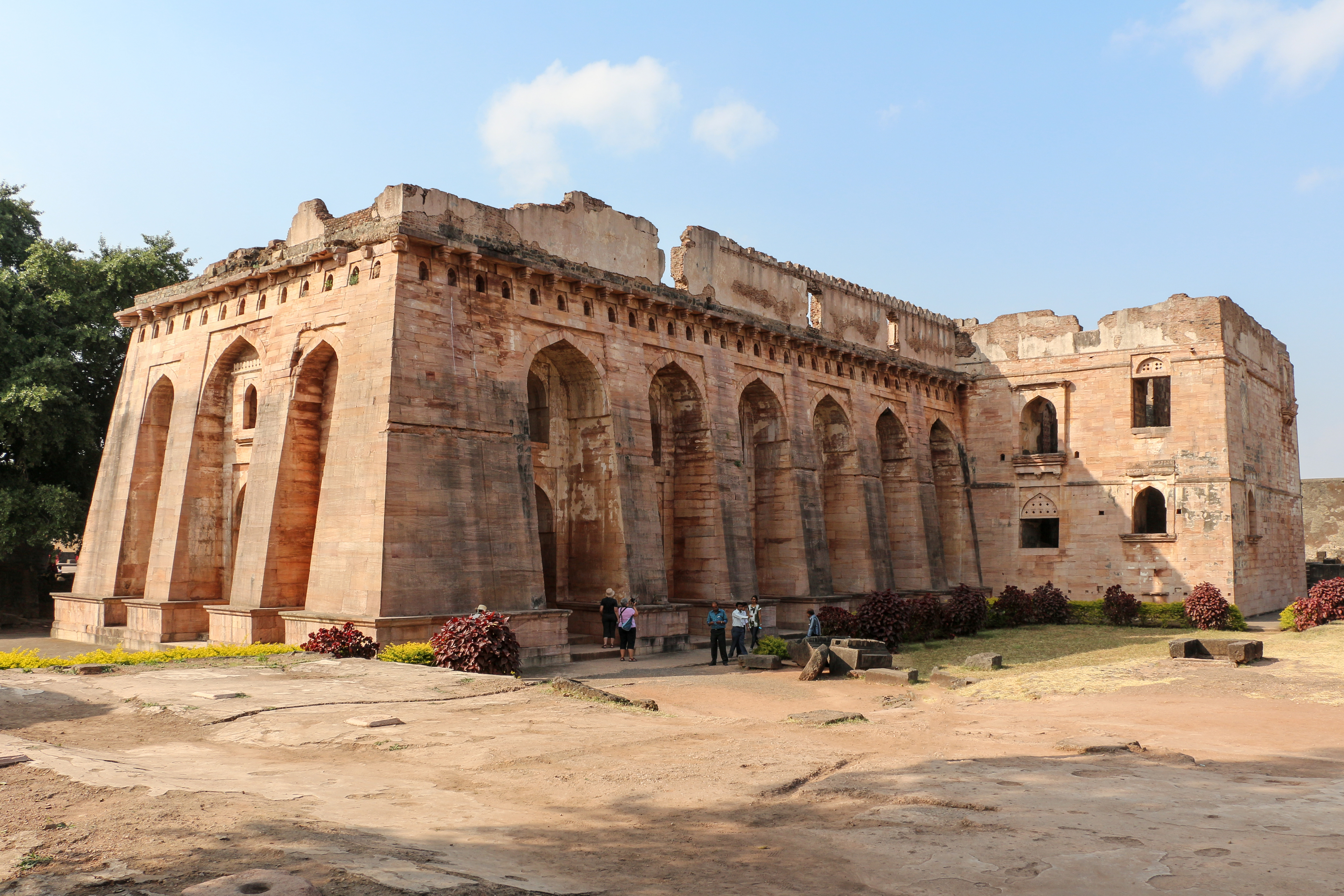
Hindola Mahal

=== Palaces of Roopmati and Bazbahadur ===
The palace of Sultan Baz Bahadur and Roopmati are exquisite examples of the Islamic style of architecture. They have large courtyards. The palace of Roopmati was used as a check post in the times of an invasion. The tale of these two still resonates in the monuments of Mandu. Sultan Baz Bahadur had gone to the dense woods near the Narmada River. Here he heard a sweet voice singing a divine song. When he reached the spot, he saw a beautiful maiden singing to the woods, the deer and the birds. He was mesmerized by her beauty and enchanted by her voice. When he asked her to become his wife she told him that until and unless the River Narmada starts flowing at Mandu she will not be able to marry him. This was because she used to pay homage to the river before having her food. The Sultan then went to the river and asked it to climb over the mountain and start flowing at Mandu. The river god granted his wish and told him to search for a sacred tamarisk and dig wherever it is found. There he found a spring of pure Narmada water which was a tributary. The king dug a reservoir at the place which was called the Rewa Kund. Rewa is another name of the river Narmada. He built a palace at this place and the waters of the fountain were provided to the baths of the palace. The river can be seen at a distance, as a silvery shimmering line in the Nimar plains, from the palace. Baz Bahadur was later defeated in a battle and fled from the battlefield. Roopmati committed suicide after consuming poison. The balladeers of Malwa still tell you their story.

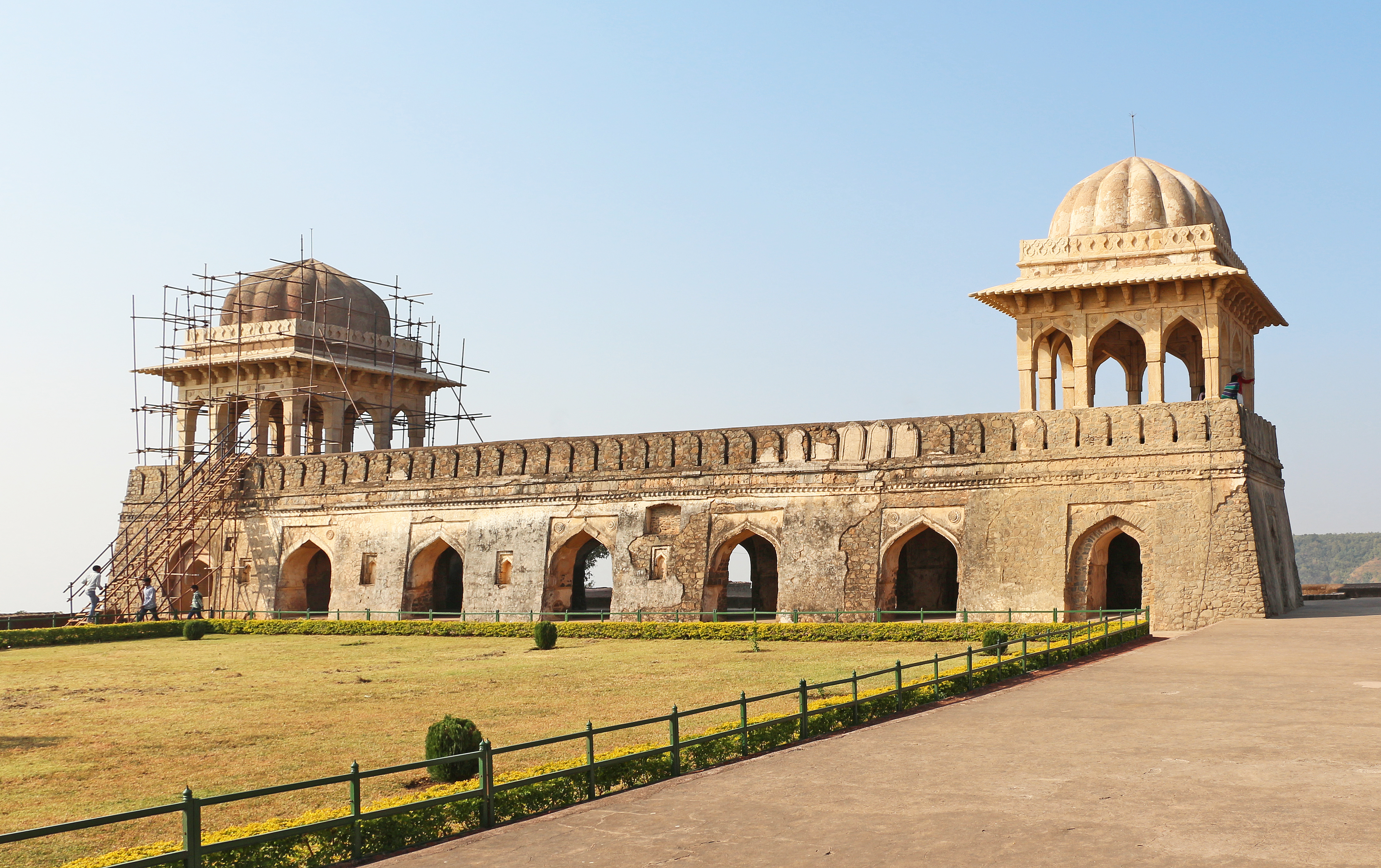
Roopmati's Pavilion

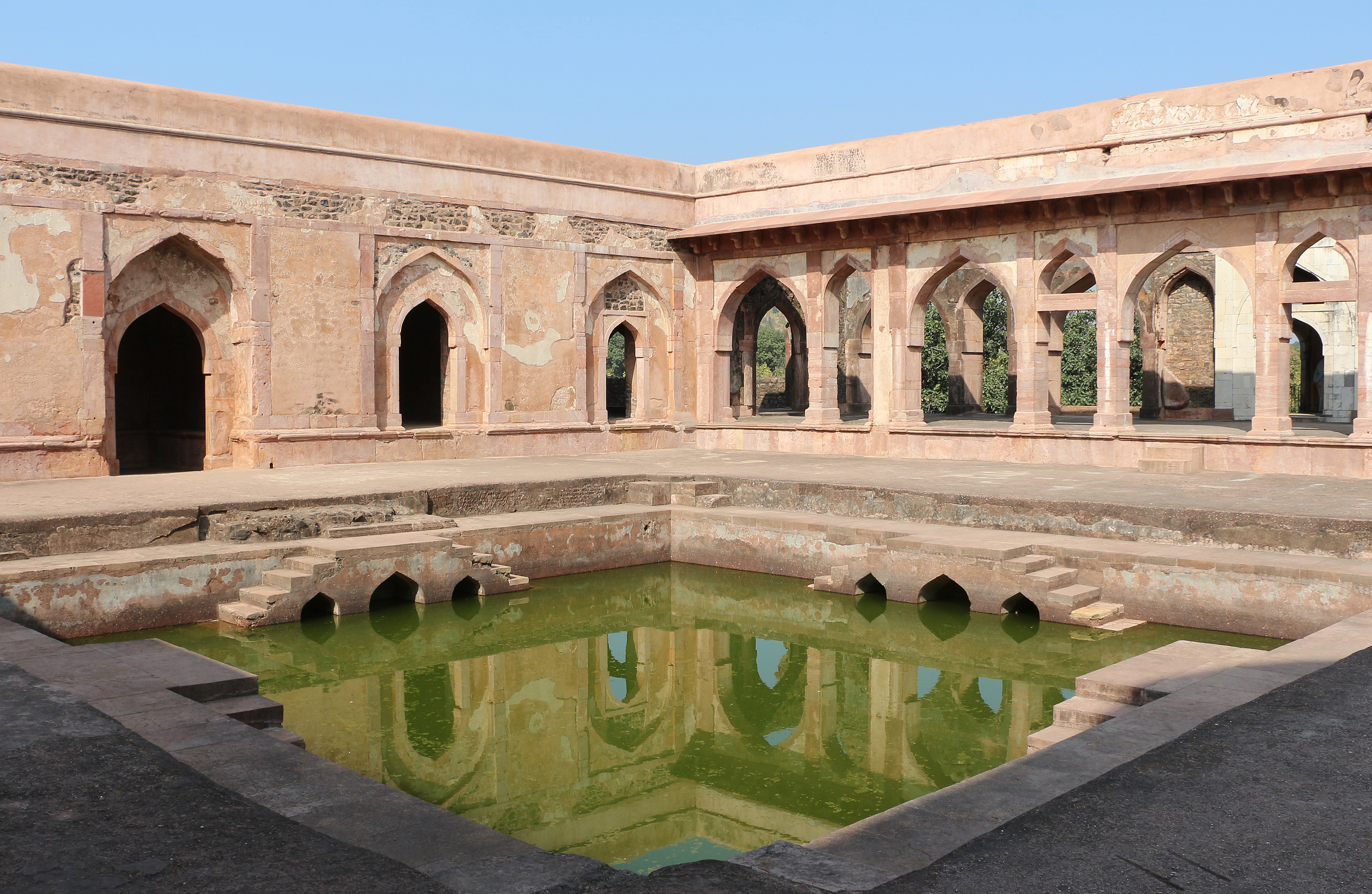
Baz Bahadur's Palace

There is a jamia mosque in mandu The Jama Masjid, also called Jami Masjid, is an historic Friday mosque in Mandu in the Dhar district of the state of Madhya Pradesh, India. Built in Mughal style, the mosque has been believed to have been built during the reign of Hoshang Shah and completed during the reign of Mahmud Khilji in 1454 CE.

The Masjid has three large domes, a courtyard, 54 smaller domes and colonnade of pillared halls. It has a prayer hall and decorated pillars in the masjid. The entire area of the mosque is 7,725 square metres (83,150 sq ft), built on an elevated platform 4.6 m (15 ft). The inscriptions on the eastern doorway to the porch indicates that the mosque was modeled on the basis of Mosque of Damascus. In modern times, the Group of Monuments at Mandu is maintained and administered by the Bhopal circle of the Archaeological Survey of India.
