= Mughal conquest of Malwa =

1560–1570 Mughal military campaign

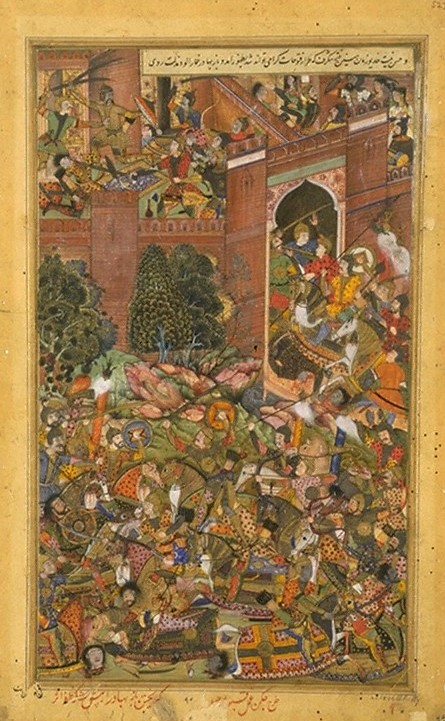
- Mughal troops storm the fort at Mandu, defeating Baz Bahadur
Date	1560–November 1570
Location	Malwa Sultanate
Result	Mughal victory
Territorial changes	Mughal annexation of Malwa

Belligerents
Mughal Empire	Malwa Sultanate; Khandesh Sultanate; Berar Sultanate

Commanders and leaders
Adham Khan; Pir Muhammad Khan Shirwani †; Abdullah Khan Uzbeg	Baz Bahadur

The Mughal conquest of Malwa was a military campaign launched by the Mughal Empire in 1560 during the reign of Akbar (r. 1556–1605) against the Sultanate of Malwa, which had broken free from Mughal rule during the rebellion of Sher Shah Suri from the emperor Humayun. Thus, Akbar had a claim to the province. Baz Bahadur had been the governor of Malwa in the Sur Empire but broke away after the death of Sher Shah.

== Conquest ==
In early 1561, Emperor Akbar initiated a military campaign aimed at expanding the Mughal Empire by targeting the region of Malwa, he appointed two trusted commanders, Adham Khan and Pir Muhammad Khan, to lead the offensive. At that time, Malwa was under the control of Baz Bahadur, a ruler more devoted to the arts, music, and personal indulgence than to the responsibilities of governance.

When the Mughal forces reached Sarangpur, the capital of Malwa, Baz Bahadur’s army quickly disintegrated. Many of his most loyal officers deserted him, forcing him to flee in the face of the disciplined and well-organized imperial troops. The Mughal forces swiftly took control of his treasures, elephants, and royal harem. His consort, Roopamati, chose to take her own life rather than face captivity, viewing the conquerors as uncivilized and unworthy. According to chronicler Badauni, the Mughal commanders committed severe atrocities during the conquest, executing prisoners and their families indiscriminately, showing no regard even for religious figures or the sanctity of the Quran.

Following this swift and brutal success, Adham Khan began acting with unchecked arrogance. He sent only a token portion of the spoils, including a few elephants, to Akbar and retained the majority of the wealth and captives for himself. Although Akbar was generally known for his sense of justice and restraint, this act of insubordination infuriated him. Without delay, he departed from Agra with a small escort and reached Sarangpur before any official communication could arrive. Upon his arrival, Adham Khan submitted, but Akbar made it clear that he would not tolerate such disobedience, denying him basic courtesies such as clean clothes or water.

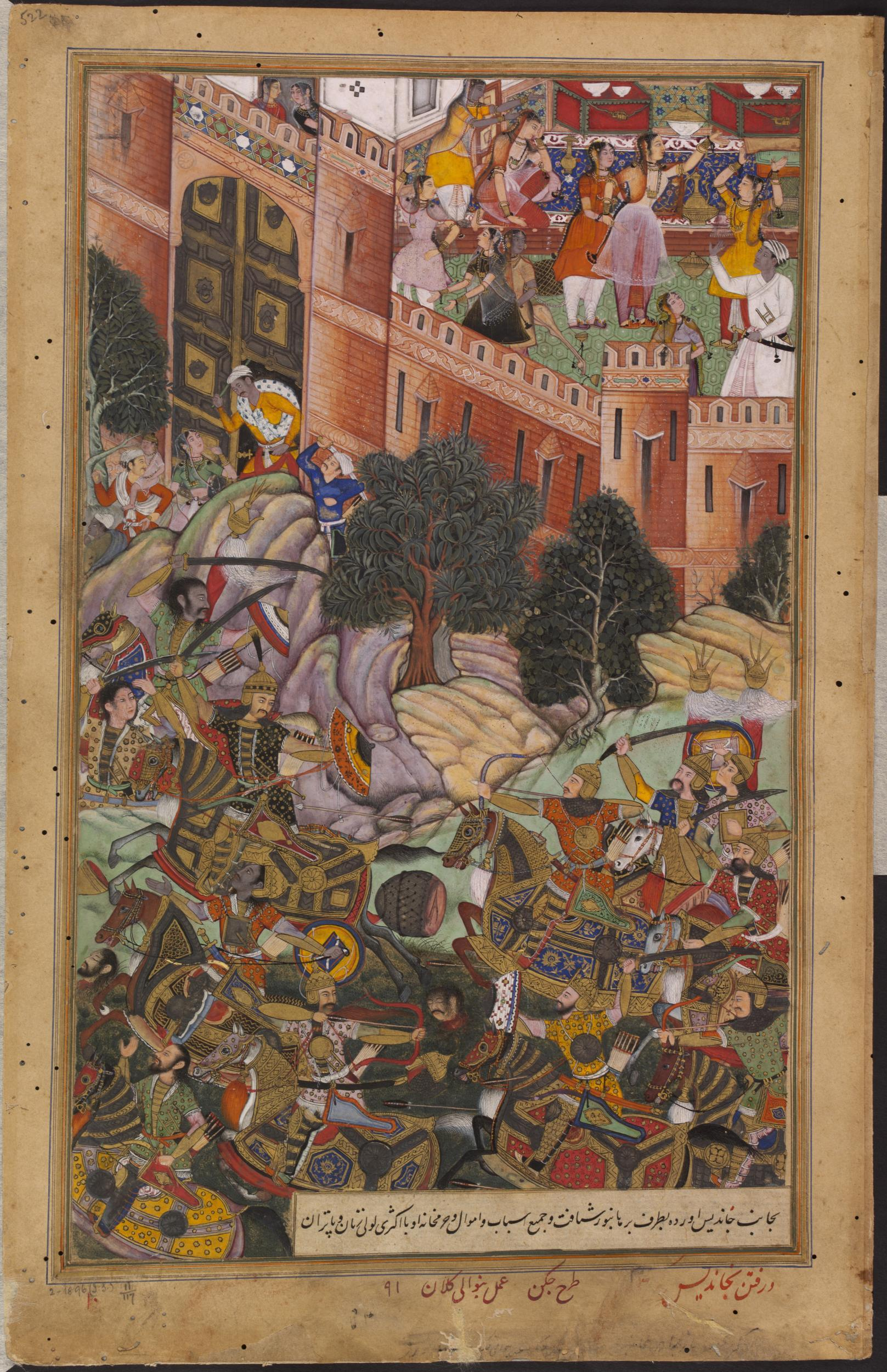
Baz Bahadur fleeing Mandu after losing to the Mughals in 1561.

Maham Anaga, Akbar’s foster mother and Adham Khan’s mother, later arrived in Malwa and sought to mediate between the emperor and her son. Though Akbar eventually agreed to forgive Adham Khan once the stolen goods were returned, the matter did not end there. Adham Khan had secretly kept two particularly beautiful women for himself. When Akbar learned of this as he was preparing to return to Agra, he halted his journey and took further action. Fearing harsher consequences for her son, Maham Anaga took matters into her own hands. She reportedly bribed a female guard to murder the two women and conceal their bodies, coldly remarking that "severed heads make no sound." Upon his return to Agra, Akbar formally dismissed Adham Khan from command and reassigned the Malwa campaign solely to Pir Muhammad Khan. Initially, Pir Muhammad advanced successfully, capturing Bijargarh and pushing further into Khandesh, where Baz Bahadur had sought refuge. In his ambition, he seized strategic locations including the fort of Asirgarh and the city of Burhanpur, leaving widespread devastation in his path. However, his fortune changed dramatically when he ignored his officers’ advice and attempted to cross the Narmada River by night. During the crossing, he fell from his horse and drowned, bringing a sudden end to his campaign. Baz Bahadur, aided by the Khandesh and Berar Sultanates, briefly reclaimed Malwa in 1562 following Pir Muhammad Khan’s death. Nevertheless, Mughal dominance was soon reestablished, and the region remained under imperial control thereafter.

With the loss of its leader, the Mughal forces were compelled to withdraw from Malwa, allowing Baz Bahadur a brief chance to regain control of his kingdom. This, however, was only temporary. In 1562, Akbar sent another army under Abdullah Khan, which successfully re-established Mughal rule in the region. Baz Bahadur then spent years as a fugitive until he finally surrendered in November 1570. Akbar pardoned him and appointed him as a court musician.
