= Rai Praveen =

Indian poet and courtesan

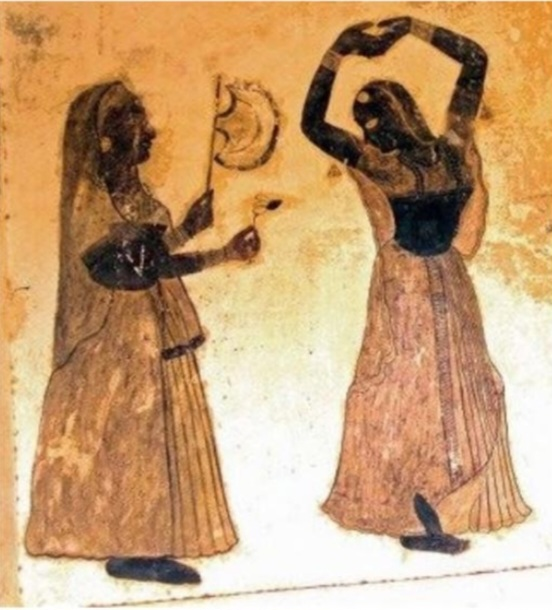
- Mural depicting Rai Praveen with an attendant, c.17th century
- Born: 1571, Orchha State, Bundelkand
- Died: Bundelkhand, India
- Father: Madhav
- Mother: Satya

Rai Praveen was a 17th-century Indian courtesan and poet from the Kingdom of Orchha in Bundelkhand.

== Life ==
According to Keshavdas's writings, Rai Praveen was born as Purnima to a dancer named Satya and a man named Madhav, who was the son of a metal smith named Bhurelal from the village of Vardvara. According to the astrologers her birth was conisdered highly auspicious. Prince Indrajit Singh one day had come to the Vardvara village in disguise where he saw the women performing the rasa dance. He was entranced by Purnima's beauty and talent and asked his courtiers to find out more about her. After being told she was the daughter of a metalsmith, Prince Indrajit offered to move Madhav and his family to Orchha and have Purnima (bestowed the name of Rai Praveen by Indrajit) study poetry and prose with the poet Keshavdas. She was described as talented in dance, music, and poetry, and to be proficent in playing the veena. She came under the tutelage of Keshavdas, who became the rajguru following his father. She was known for her eloquence, and her beauty was compared to Roopmati and Mriganayani.

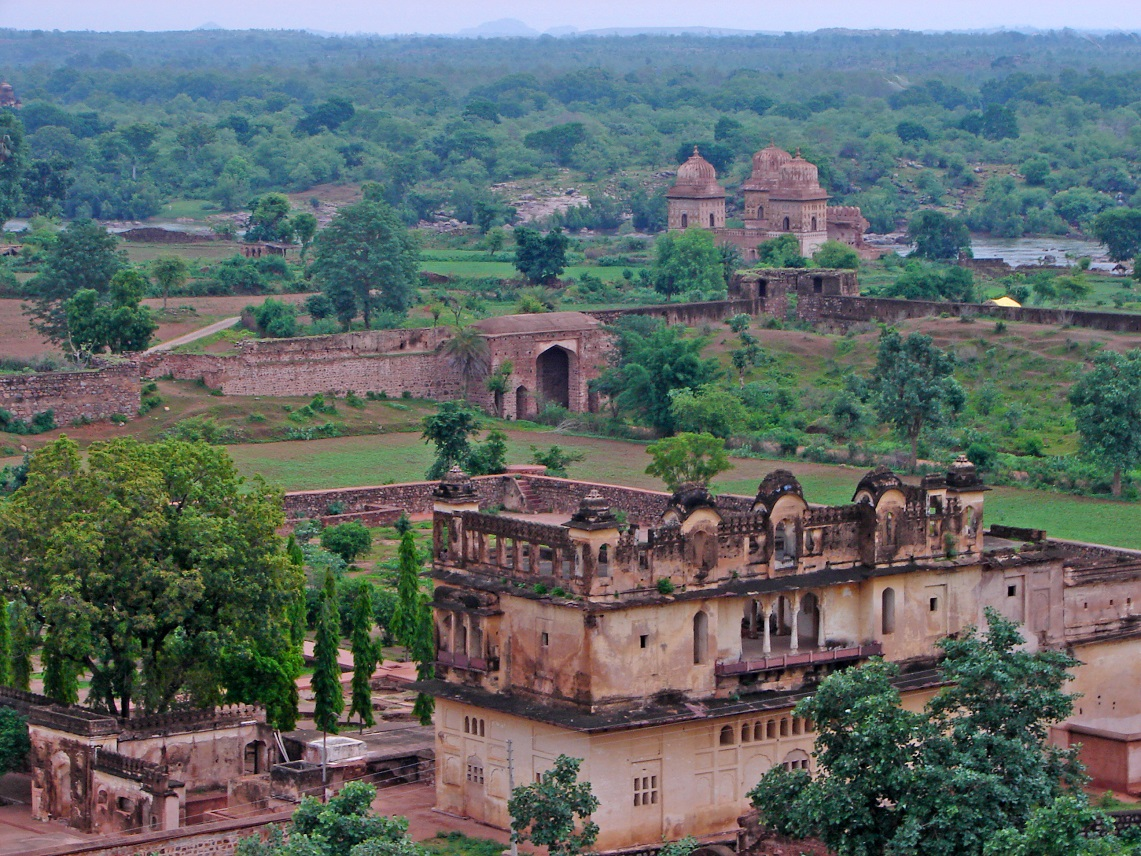
Praveen Rai Mahal

Rai Praveen soon became the favorite patar (concubine) of Prince Indrajit Singh and they were both in love with each other. She had her own palace built for her in Orchha, the Pravin Rai Mahal built by prince (and later King) Indrajit Singh in 1618. It is a state protected monument. The other names of this palace are Anand Mandal Bagh and Rai Praveen Manika Bhavan, it is also known as 'Tope Khana' since later in time, it was used as a lookout post for Orchha Fort.

== Confrontation with Emperor Akbar ==
Soon, words of her fame spread far and wide, eventually reaching the ears of Emperor Akbar, who wished for her to join the Imperial harem. He summoned her to the capital to perform at the darbar, to which she reluctantly agreed. The plan of sending Rai Praveen to Akbar's court was hatched by Rukmini, Indrajit's first consort. She and her maid felt that if Rai Praveen was sent to the Mughal Imperial harem, she would finally be out of their sight. When her brother in law, Ram Shah, who was a courtier in Akbar's court received the letter written by them, saying that Emperor Akbar was enamoured with Rai Praveen, he was deeply disturbed and consulted Kamsena, a courtesan who was his companian. She said that Rai Praveen was skillful in self-protection and would be able to negotiate her way out of Akbar's court. Rai Praveen, accompanied by Keshavadas, was then sent to his court by Indrajit.

After Keshavdas recited a few poems, it was Rai Praveen's turn. She soon recited her last poem:

"O mighty emperor, listen to the request of Rai Praveen. It is only those who collect eaten food, the crow and the dog who eat defiled food."

Akbar, visibly angry, left the court and retired to his quarters. He called Abdul Rahim Khan-i-Khanan and said that she's very talented, to which he replied that Rai Praveen spoke well. Akbar returned to the court and announced that Rai Praveen will be sent back home with various gifts, and thus she was able to return to Orchha with Indrajit Singh.
