= Malwa Subah =

Subdivision of the Mughal Empire between 1568–1737

Malwa Province Malwa Subah
- 1568–1737
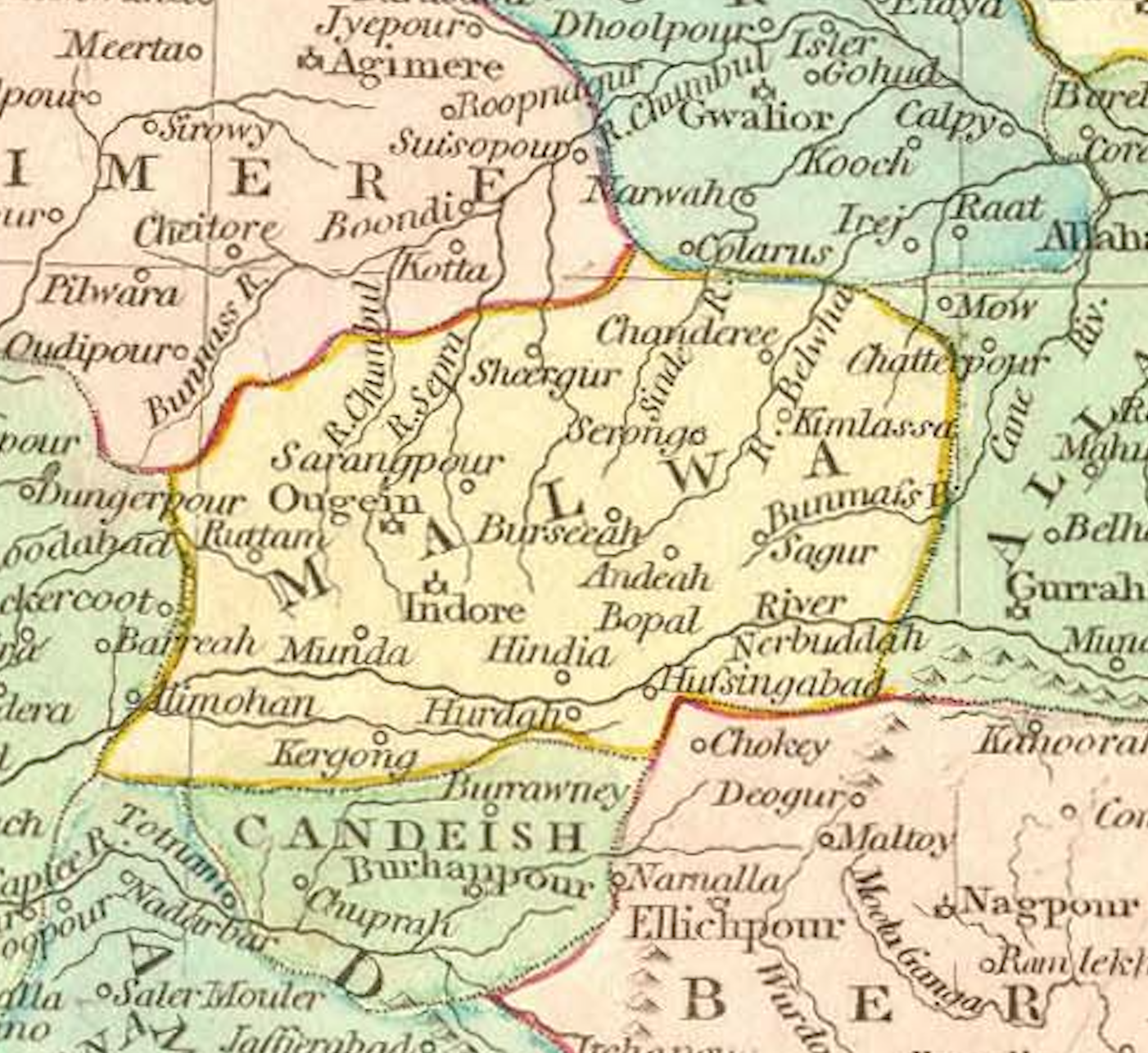
- Malwa Subah depicted in map of Mughal Empire by Robert Wilkinson (1805)
- Capital: Ujjain; 23.177°N 75.786°E
- Subahdar
  - 1561: Adham Khan Koka (first)
  - 1732–1737: Jai Singh II (last)
- History
  - First conquered from Baz Bahadur: 29 March 1561
  - Established: 1568
  - Battle of Bhopal: 24 December 1737

Area
  - 1601: 114,940 sq mi (297,700 km^{2})
Preceded by	Succeeded by
Malwa Sultanate	Maratha Confederacy
- Today part of: India

The Malwa Subah (Persian: صوبه ملوا) was one of the original twelve Subahs (provinces) of the Mughal Empire, including Gondwana, from 1568–1743. Its seat was Ujjain in the Malwa region. It shared borders with the autonomous and tributary chiefdoms in the east, as well as Berar, Khandesh, Ahmadnagar, Gujarat, Ajmer, Agra, and Illahabad subahs.

== History ==
Before becoming part of the Mughal Empire, the Malwa region was an independent sultanate. Its last ruler, Baz Bahadur, was defeated and its capital, Mandu, was conquered in 1562 by the Mughal Emperor Akbar’s army led by Abdullah Khan, the Uzbeg. He was appointed its first governor. In 1564 he was replaced by Qara Bahadur Khan. In 1568 it became a subah of Mughal empire. One of its last governors was Sawai Jai Singh, who was the governor of the Subah for three times, from 1714-17, from 1729-30 and from 28 September 1732 to 4 August 1737. The Mughal hold on Malwa ended in 1743, when Peshwa Balaji Baji Rao obtained the formal grant of Naib-subahdari (deputy governorship) of Malwa.

== Administrative divisions ==
Malwa Subah comprised 12 sarkars (districts): Ujjain, Chanderi, Raisen, Garha Mandla, Sarangpur, Bijagarh, Mandu, Handia, Nandurbar, Mandsaur, Gagron and Kotri-Parava. These sarkars are further divided into 301 parganas. The city of Ujjain was the capital of the subah.

The sarkars (districts) and the parganas (tehsils) of Malwa Subah were:

Sarkar	Pargana
Ujjain	10 parganas, Ujjain was the capital
Raisen	32 parganas
Garha Mandla	57 parganas
Chanderi	61 parganas
Sarangpur	24 parganas
Bijagarh	29 parganas
Mandu	16 parganas
Handia	23 parganas
Nandurbar	7 parganas
Mandsaur	17 parganas
Gagron	12 parganas
Kotri-Pirawa	10 parganas

== Mughal Subahdars (Governors) of Malwa (1561–1737) ==
Personal Name	Reign
Conquest of Malwa from Baz Bahadur by the Mughal Emperor Akbar
Adham Khan Koka	1561
Pir Muhammad Khan	1561
Malwa retaken by Baz Bahadur
Abdullah Khan Uzbek	1562 – 1564
Abdullah Khan Uzbek revolts; Malwa retaken by Emperor Akbar
Muhammad Quli Khan Barlas	1564 – 1566
Shihab-ud-din Ahmed Khan	1566 – 1568
Qutb-ud-din Muhammad Khan	1568 – ?
Muzaffar Khan Turbati	1573? – ?
Shihab-ud-din Ahmed Khan	1574? – 1577?
Qutb-ud-din Muhammad Khan	1577? – ?
Mirza Aziz Koka Khan-e-Azam	1578? – 1590
Ahmed	1590
Sultan Murad Mirza	1590 – 1594
Mirza Shahrukh	1594 – 1600
Sultan Daniyal Mirza	1600 – 1604
Pir Khan Lodhi Khan Jahan II	1627 – ?
Abdullah Khan Firoz Jang	1657 – ?
Mukhtiyar Khan	1697 – 1701
Abu Nasr Khan Shaista Khan II	1701 – 1704
Sultan Bidar Bakht	1704 – 1706
Ikhlas Khan Khan-e-Aalam	1706 – 1707
Nijabat Khan	1707
Abdullah Khan	1707
Sawai Mirza Raja Jai Singh II	1714 – 1717
Mir Qamar-ud-din Khan, Nizam-ul-Mulk	1719 – 1722
Girdhar Bahadur	1722 – 1723
Azim-ullah Khan	1723 – 1725
Girdhar Bahadur	1725 – 1728
Sawai Mirza Raja Jai Singh II	1729 – 1730
Muhammad Khan Bangash Ghazanfar Jang	1730 – 1732
Sawai Mirza Raja Jai Singh II	1732 – 1737
Conquered by Marathas under Baji Rao I in 1737

== See also ==
- Malwa Sultanate
