= Pir Muhammad Khan Shirwani =

Mughal general

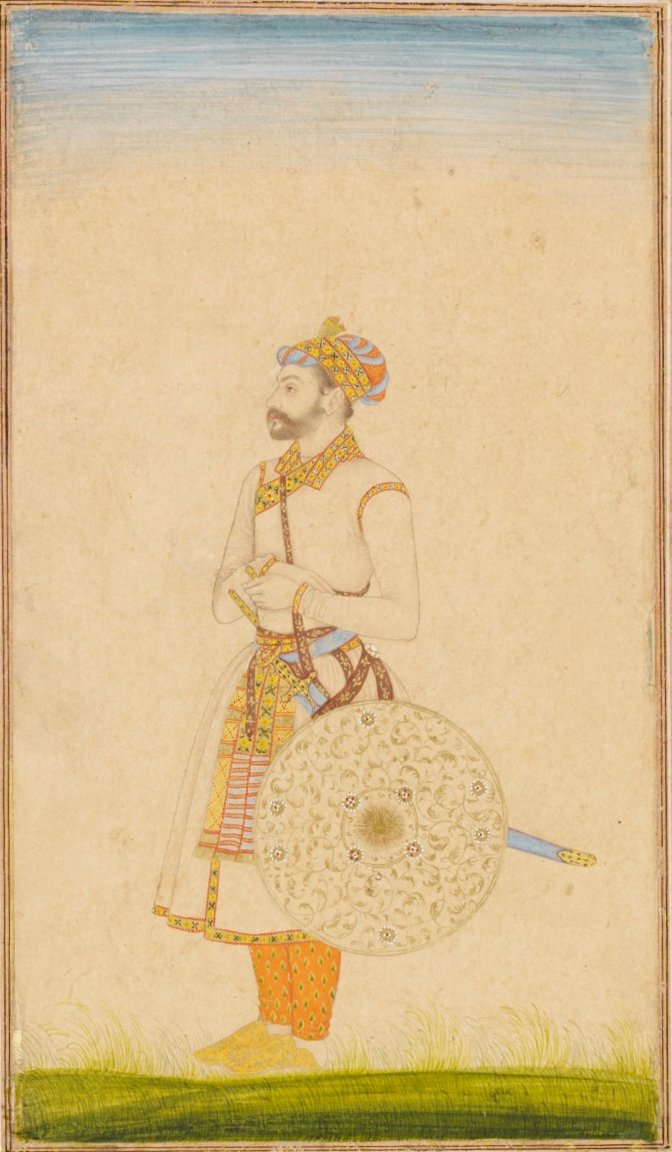
Pir Muhammad Khan Shirwani

Maulana Pir Muhammad Khan Shirwani was a senior official of the Mughal Empire and a commander in the Mughal Army.

== Biography ==
Pir Muhammad was the Vakil-i-Mutlaq (general manager) of the regent of the Mughal Empire, Bairam Khan, who had granted him the titles of Khan and Sultan. However, in 1559, he was temporarily dismissed by Bairam due to his arrogance and ordered to go to Mecca for Hajj (pilgrimage) and was replaced by Haji Muhammad Sistani. This displeased Akbar as the dismissal of a senior official without prior consultation with the emperor was a sign of blatant disrespect on Bairam's part and Akbar decided to dismiss Bairam. Pir Muhammad, who had travelled till Gujarat and made his way back to Rajputana, was sent secret messages by Akbar to be ready to return. Later in 1560, when Bairam was ordered by Akbar to go for Hajj, on the insistence of his political opponents Maham Anga and her son Adham Khan, Pir Muhammad (who had returned to the Mughal court) was sent to follow him and 'pack him off to Mecca'. This offended Bairam Khan, who rebelled. Not wanting to face Bairam's Turkoman horse archers, Pir Muhammad hastily retreated. Bairam was later defeated and once again ordered to go for Hajj. This time, he complied but was assassinated en route by an Afghan rival.

=== Conquest of Malwa ===
In early 1561, Akbar sent Adham Khan and Pir Muhammad to lead an army to capture Malwa (in present-day Madhya Pradesh and south-eastern Rajasthan, India. The ruler of the Malwa Sultanate, Baz Bahadur attempted to resist them at his capital, Sarangpur, but was deserted by his best officers and defeated, though he managed to escape to Khandesh, leaving behind his harem, treasure and war elephants. Adham Khan and Pir Muhammad then conducted a general massacre in Malwa, killing women, children and even Sayyids, who were descendants of the Islamic prophet Muhammad. Adham Khan kept all of the captive women and choice spoils for himself. His insolence infuriated Akbar, who dismissed him and the campaign of Malwa was left in command of Pir Muhammad, who was tasked to capture the fugitive Baz Bahadur.

Pir Muhammad went south and captured Bijargarh (in present-day Madhya Pradesh) again with general massacre and invaded the kingdom of Khandesh, were Baz Bahadur had taken refuge. He also captured the fortress of Asirgarh and marched towards Burhanpur (both in present-day southern Madhya Pradesh), destroying everything on his way and conducting general massacres. At Burhanpur, however, he was defeated by a coalition of Baz Bahadur, Mubarak Khan II, ruler of Khandesh and Tufal Khan, ruler of Berar (in present-day Maharashtra).

=== Death ===
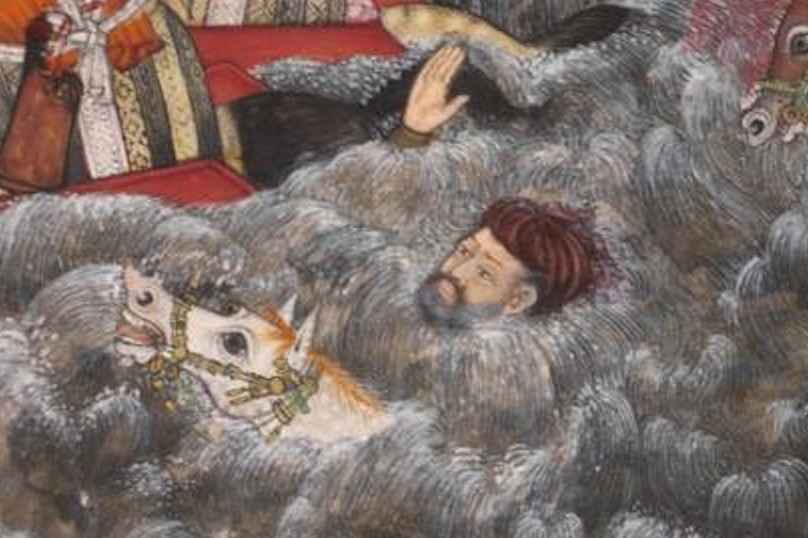
Drowning of Pir Muhammad

Outnumbered by this coalition, Pir Muhammad hastily retreated back towards Malwa. Having reached the Narmada River at night, he insisted on crossing it immediately despite his officers warning him not to do so. In the middle of the river, he fell off from his horse and drowned.

== Legacy ==
Following his death, the leaderless Mughal army retreated from Malwa and Baz Bahadur temporarily recovered his kingdom. In 1562, Akbar sent his general Abdullah Khan Uzbeg to capture Malwa who managed to restore Mughal authority in the region. Baz Bahadur remained a fugitive till he surrendered to Akbar in 1570. Akbar pardoned him and made him a musician at his court.

== In popular culture ==
In the Indian historical fiction television series Bharat Ka Veer Putra – Maharana Pratap, which ran on the channel Sony Entertainment Television from 2013 to 2015, Pir Muhammad Khan was portrayed by actor Kunal Bakshi. Pir Muhammad was also shown as a minor character in the TV series Jodha Akbar. In both these series, Pir Muhammad is shown to have been killed by being drowned rather than drowning accidentally as in history.
