= Malwa Sultanate =

Late medieval kingdom in northern India (1401–1562)

Malwa Sultanate سلطنت مالوا
- 1401–1562
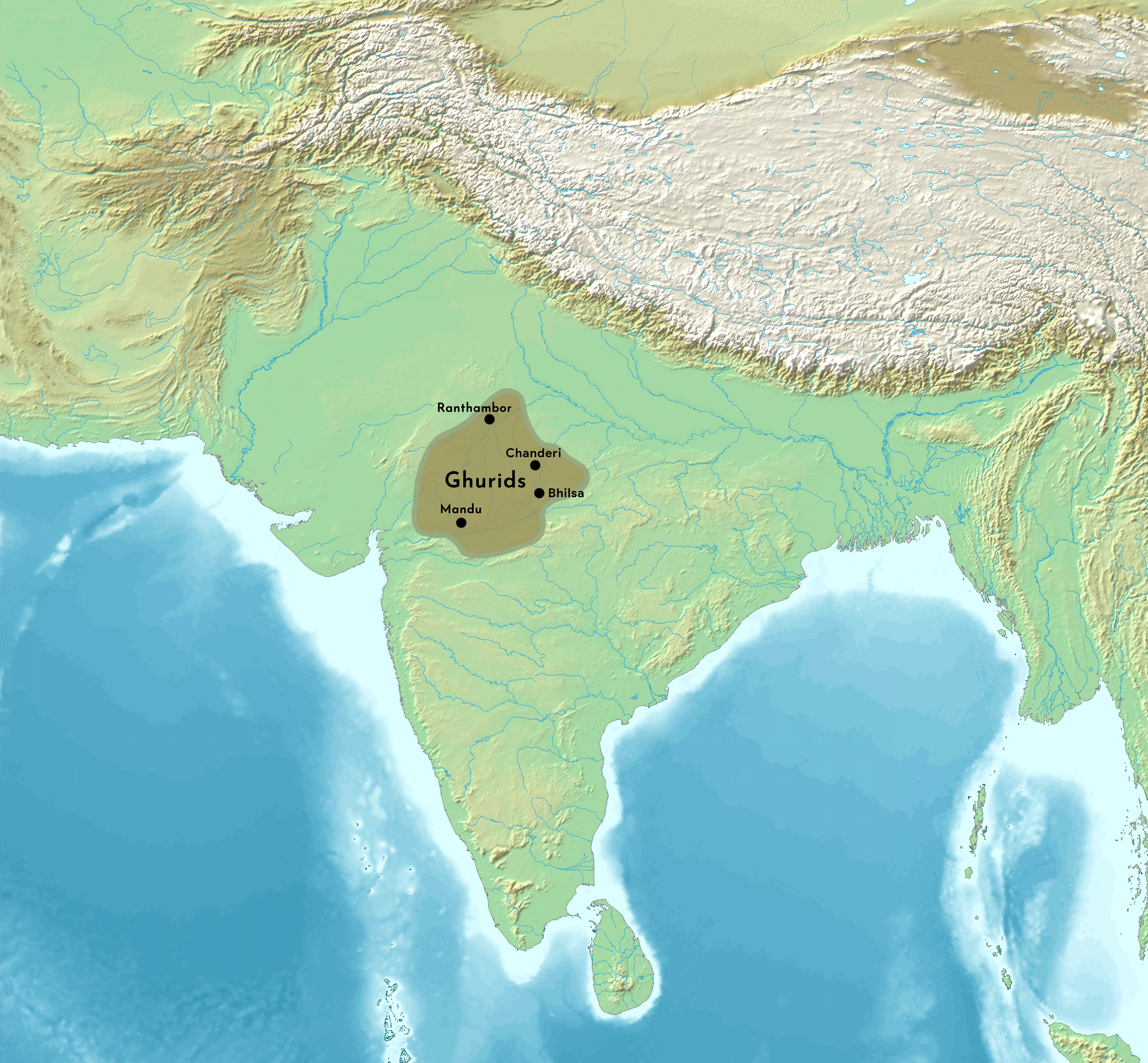
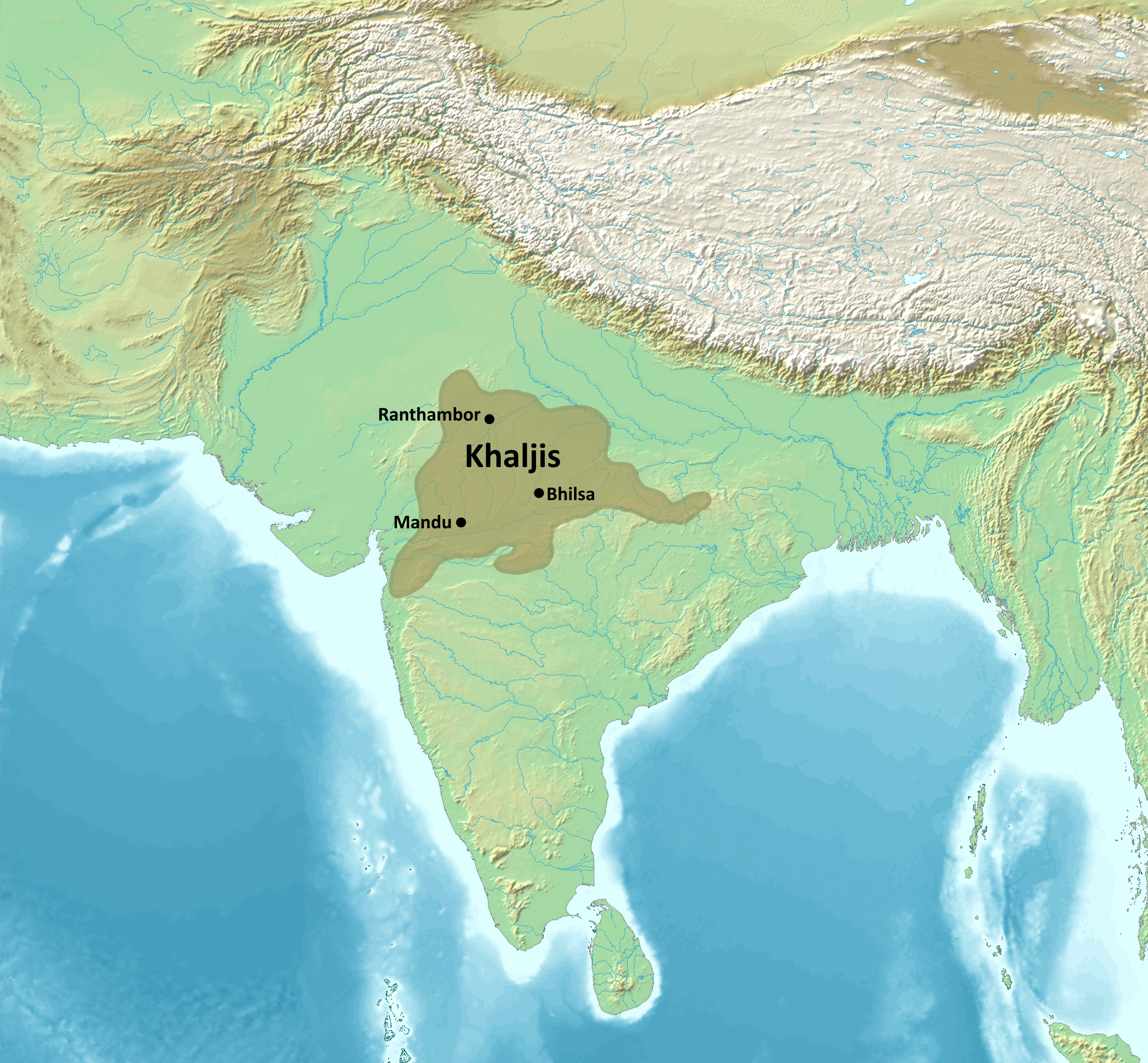
- Capital: Dhar (1401–1406); Mandu (1406–1562)
- Common languages: Persian (official)
- Religion: Sunni Islam
- Government: Absolute monarchy
- Sultan
  - 1401 – 1406: Dilawar Khan (first)
  - 1555 – 1562: Baz Bahadur (last)
- History
  - Established: 1401
  - Muzaffar Shah's invasion of Malwa: 1407
  - Kalpi War: 1413–1444
  - Malwa–Bahmani Wars: 1425–1466
  - Siege of Mandu (1518): 1518
  - Battle of Gagron: 1519
  - Mughal conquest of Malwa: 1562
Preceded by
Delhi Sultanate
Kherla kingdom
Kingdom of Kalpi
Succeeded by
Malwa Subah
Gujarat Sultanate
- Today part of: India

The Malwa Sultanate (Note: Persian: سلطنت مالوا) was a late medieval kingdom in the Malwa region, covering the present day Indian states of Madhya Pradesh and south-eastern Rajasthan from 1401 to 1562. It was founded by the Afghan Dilawar Khan, who following Timur's invasion and the disintegration of the Delhi Sultanate, in 1401, made Malwa an independent realm.

Malwa was invaded and occupied by Muzaffar Shah of Gujarat in 1407 and restored in 1408 AD. Following the Battle of Gagron in 1519, much of the Sultanate came under the brief control of Maharana of Mewar Rana Sanga, and he appointed one of his vassals, Medini Rai, to rule over the Sultanate. In 1562, the Sultanate was conquered from its last ruler, Baz Bahadur, by the Mughal Empire under Akbar the Great, and it became a subah of the empire. The Sultanate was predominantly ruled by Afghan and Turco-Afghan dynasties throughout its existence.

== History ==
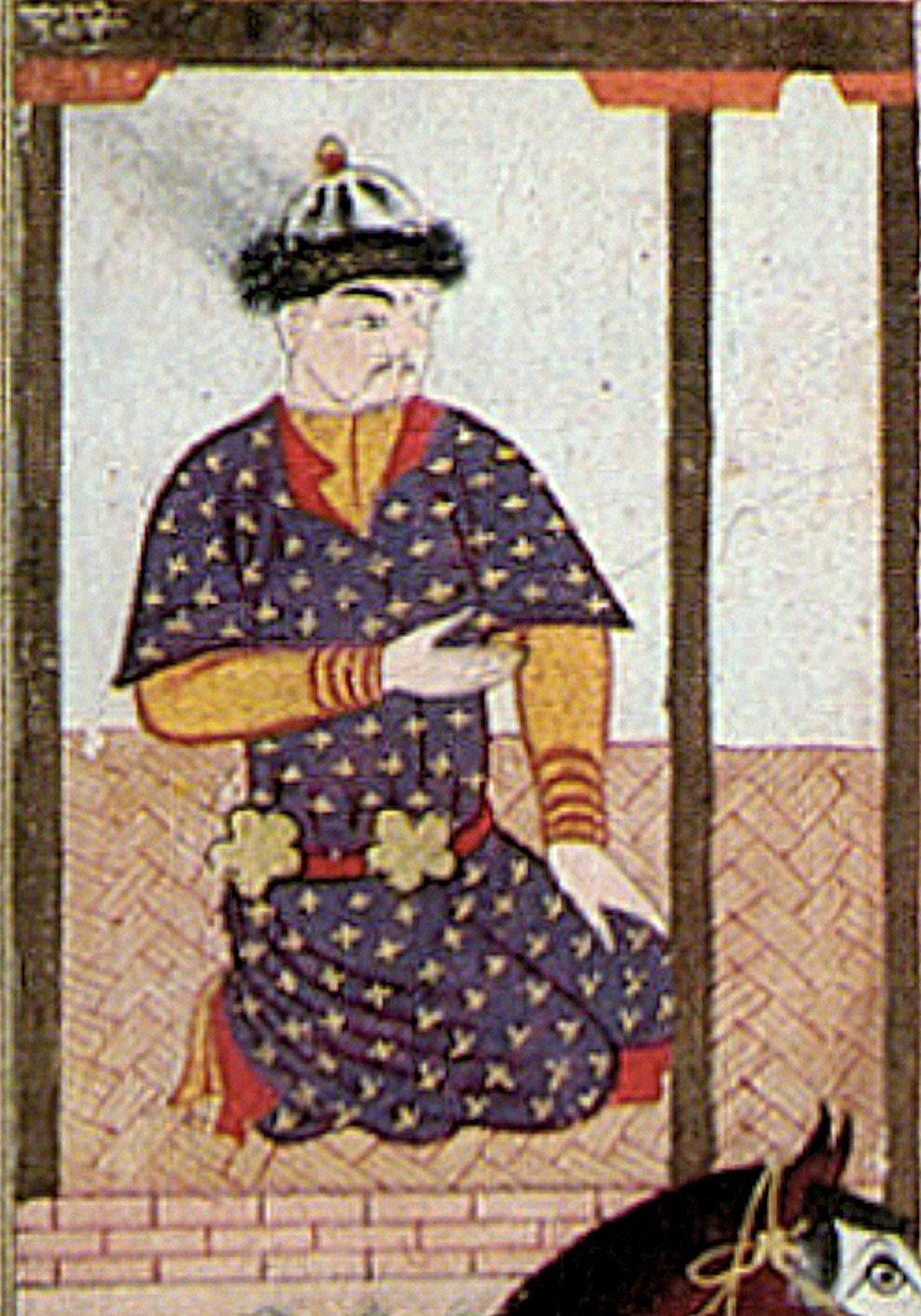
Depiction of a "Ghurid tyrant". Bustan of Sa‘di (1257). Copy from Mandu, Malwa Sultanate, India, c. 1500

Dilawar Khan Ghuri was an Afghan governor of the Delhi Sultanate. Dilawar Khan had ceased to pay tribute to Delhi after 1392. In 1437, the Ghurid dynasty of Dilawar Khan was overthrown by Mahmud Khan, a Khalji Afghan descendant of the Khalji dynasty of the Delhi Sultanate. After the Khaljis were deposed, it was ruled by Shujaat Khan, an Afghan governor of Malwa under Sher Shah Suri. Shujaat Khan's son, Baz Bahadur declared independence in 1555, and ruled until the end of the Malwa Sultanate.

=== Ghurid dynasty ===
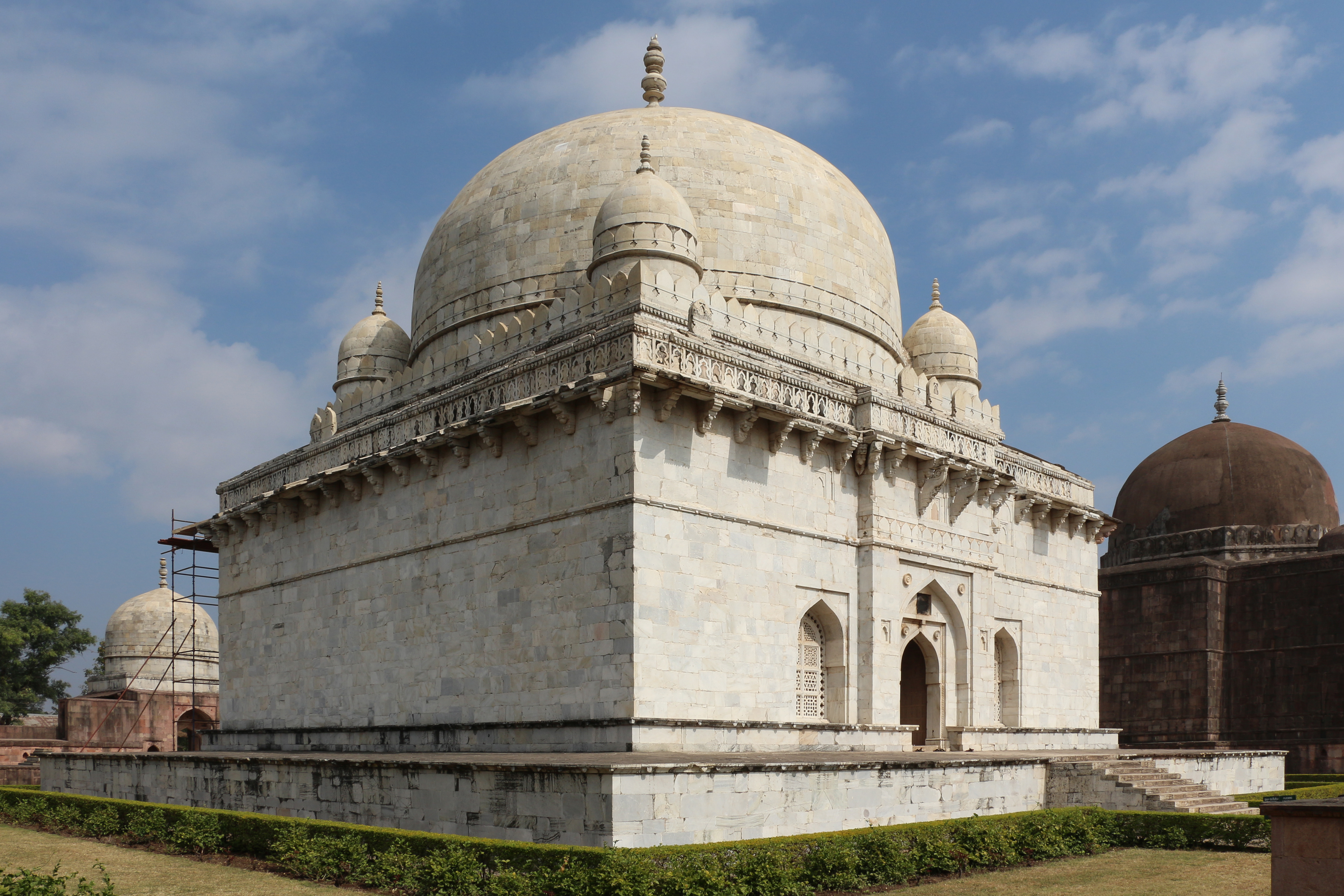
Hoshang Shah's Tomb in Mandu

The sultanate of Malwa was founded by Dilawar Khan Ghuri, the Afghan governor of Malwa for the Delhi Sultanate, who asserted his independence in 1392 and founded a "Ghurid dynasty", but did not actually assume the ensigns of royalty till 1401. Initially Dhar was the capital of the new kingdom, but soon it was shifted to Mandu, which was renamed Shadiabad (the city of joy). After his death, he was succeeded by his son Alp Khan, who assumed the title of Hoshang Shah.

The Muzaffarids under Zafar Khan Muzaffar Shah I accused Hoshang of parricide and invaded Malwa. Hoshang was defeated and captured as a prisoner, while a Muzaffarid governor was appointed at Dhar.

=== Khalji dynasty ===
The Ghurid dynasty, founded by Dilawar Khan Ghuri, was replaced by Mahmud Shah I, the Afghan who proclaimed himself king on 16 May 1436. The Khalji dynasty, founded by him, ruled over Malwa till 1531. Mahmud Shah I was related to the Khalji dynasty of Delhi, as his great-great-great-great grandfather, Malik Nasiruddin, was a cousin of sultan Jalaluddin Khalji, and was given the iqta of Amroha as his jagir. Mahmud was also a grandnephew of Dilawar Khan, the first sultan, through his sister. His father, Malik Mughlith, himself a nephew of Dilawar, played a key role in restoring his maternal cousin Hushang Shah to the throne after it had been seized by Ahmad Shah I. Mahmud had distinguished himself as a capable military commander, earning the title Khan from Hushang Shah in 1419 at the age of sixteen, who also gave him his daughter in marriage. Following Hushang’s death, Mahmud supported the accession of his oldest surviving son, Ghazni Khan, who took the regnal name Muhammad Shah. However, relations between the two deteriorated, as Muhammad Shah grew increasingly suspicious and repeatedly demanded assurances of Mahmud’s loyalty. When Muhammad Shah allegedly began plotting his assassination, Mahmud pre-empted him by having him poisoned. Muhammad’s thirteen-year-old son, Masud, was briefly placed on the throne, but Mahmud soon attacked the palace, deposed the young ruler, and seized power for himself, ascending the throne on 14 May 1436.

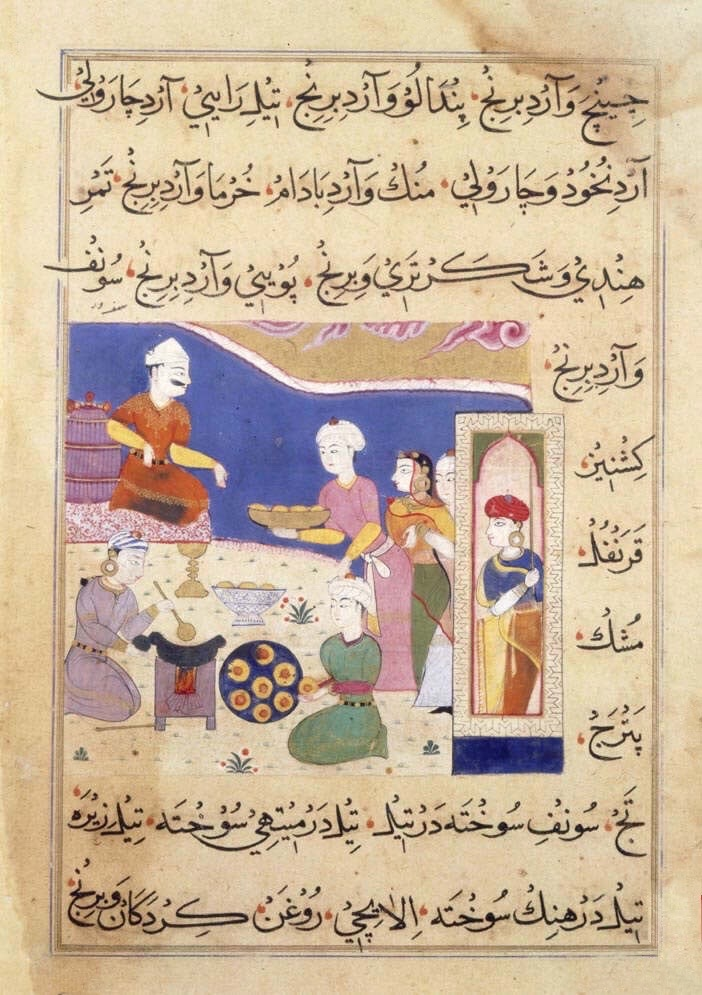
Preparation of Samosa for Ghiyath al-Din (r.1469-1500), Sultan of Malwa, at Mandu

Mahmud Khalji I was succeeded by his eldest son Ghiyas-ud-Din. The last days of Ghiyas-ud-Din were embittered by a struggle for throne between his two sons, with Nasir-ud-Din emerging victorious over Ala-ud-Din and ascending the throne on 22 October 1510.

=== Muzaffarid conquest ===
Since 1518, Mahmud Shah II became dependent on Bahadur Shah. The last ruler Mahmud Shah II surrendered to Bahadur Shah, the sultan of Gujarat after the fort of Mandu fell to Bahadur on 25 May 1531. The sultanate saw heavy decline in 1519 after the continues invasions of Rajput chief Rana Sanga of Mewar. During 1531 – 1537 the kingdom was annexed under the control of Bahadur Shah, though the Mughal emperor Humayun captured it for a short period during 1535–36. The Gujaratis regained Malwa giving allegiance to Bahadur Shah until 1542.

=== Restored Khalji dynasty ===
In 1537, Qadir Shah, an ex-officer of the previous Khalji dynasty rulers, regained control over a part of the erstwhile kingdom. But in 1542, Sher Shah Suri conquered the kingdom, defeating him and appointed Shuja'at Khan as the governor. His son, Baz Bahadur, declared himself independent in 1555. Darya Khan Gujarati, the ex-Wazir of Mahmud Khan of Gujarat ruled Ujjain.

In 1561, emperor Akbar sent the Mughal army, led by Adham Khan and Pir Muhammad Khan, which attacked Malwa and defeated Baz Bahadur in the battle of Sarangpur on 29 March 1561, culminating in the Mughal conquest of Malwa. Akbar soon recalled Adham Khan and made over command to Pir Muhammad. Pir Muhammad attacked Khandesh and proceeded up to Burhanpur, but he was defeated by a coalition of three powers: Miran Mubarak Shah II of Khandesh, Tufal Khan of Berar Sultanate and Baz Bahadur. Pir Muhammad died while retreating. The confederate army pursued the Mughals and drove them out of Malwa. Baz Bahadur regained his kingdom for a short period. In 1562, Akbar sent another army, led by Abdullah Khan, an Uzbeg, which finally defeated Baz Bahadur. He fled to Chittor. It became the Malwa Subah (top-level province) of the Mughal empire, with seat at Ujjain and Abdullah Khan became its first governor.

== Art ==
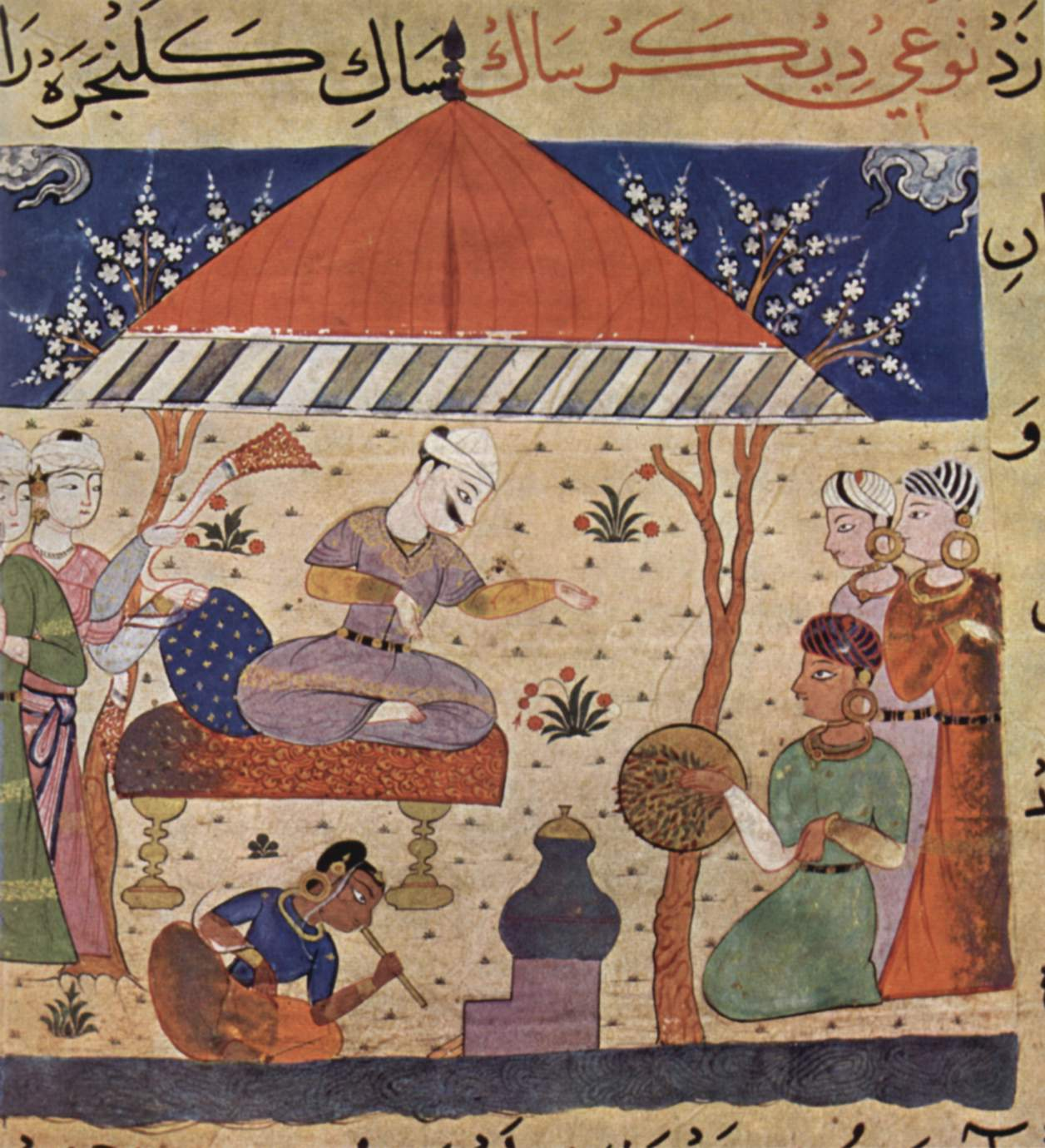
An illustration from the manuscript of the Nimat Nama

Many remarkable illustrated manuscripts were prepared during the period of the sultanate. An illustrated manuscript of Kalpa Sutra (1439) (presently in the National Museum, Delhi) was prepared in Mandu during the reign of Mahmud Shah I But the most interesting is a manuscript of the Nimat Nama, a treatise on the art of cooking, which bears many portraits of Ghiyas-ud-Din Shah but the colophon bears the name of Nasir-ud-Din Shah. The other notable illustrated manuscripts of this period are of the Miftah-ul-Fuzala, a dictionary of rare words, the Bustan (1502) painted by Haji Mahmud and the Aja'ib-us-San'ati (1508). Another manuscript of the Anwar-i-Suhaili (now in the National Museum, Delhi) probably also belong to this period.

== See also ==
- Mandsaur
- Mandu
- Mewar–Malwa conflicts
- History of Madhya Pradesh

Kingdom of Malwa

- Aulikaras
- Second Aulikara dynasty
- Paramara dynasty
