= Baz Bahadur =

Sultan of Malwa from 1555 to 1562

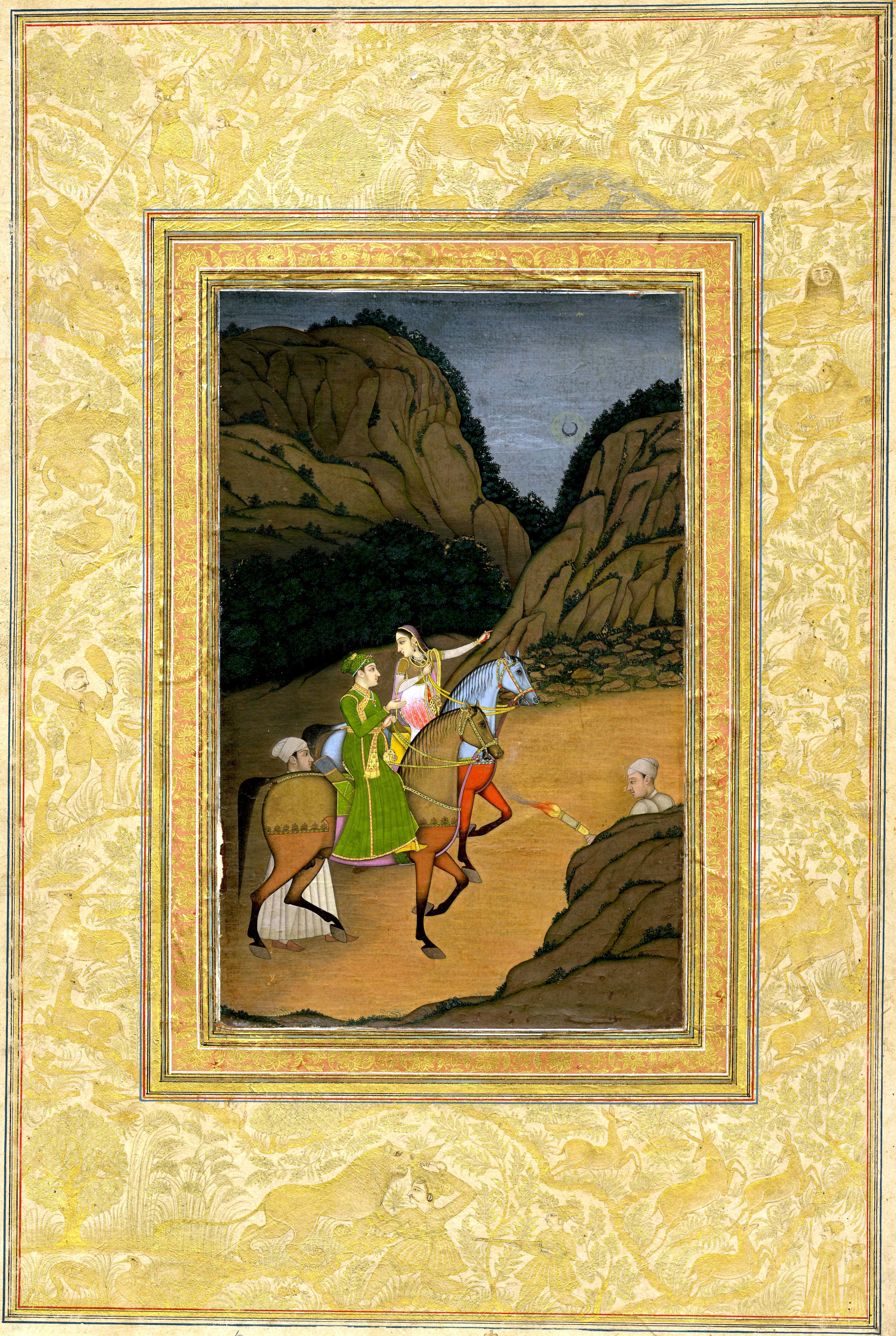
- Baz Bahadur and Roopmati on horses with attendants.

9th Sultan of Malwa
- Reign: 1555–1562
- Predecessor: Qadir Shah (as Sultan of Malwa); Shuja'at Khan (as Suri Subahdar of Malwa)
- Successor: Position abolished (Abdullah Khan Uzbek as Mughal Subahdar of Malwa)
- Spouse: Rani Roopmati
- Father: Shuja'at Khan
- Religion: Islam

Bayazid Baz Bahadur Khan was the last Sultan of the Malwa Sultanate, who reigned from 1555 to 1562. He succeeded his father, Shuja'at Khan. He is known for his romantic liaison with Roopmati.

Baz Bahadur as sultan did not bother to look after his kingdom nor maintained a strong army, being devoted to the arts and to his paramour. He fell in love with the beautiful Hindu shepherdess called Roopmati and also built the Rewa Kund, a reservoir at Mandu, equipped with an aqueduct to the Narmada. The Mughals defeated him and captured his Hindu queen Roopmati, who killed herself at this turn of events.

In 1561, Akbar's army led by Adham Khan and Pir Muhammad Khan attacked Malwa and defeated Baz Bahadur in the battle of Sarangpur on 29 March 1561. One of the reasons for Adham Khan's attack seems to be his lust for Roopmati, who poisoned herself upon hearing of the fall of Mandu. Baz Bahadur fled to Khandesh. Akbar soon recalled Adham Khan and handed over the command to Pir Muhammad, who attacked Khandesh and proceeded up to Burhanpur but was soon defeated by a coalition of Miran Mubarak Khan II of Khandesh, Tufal Khan of Berar and Baz Bahadur. Pir Muhammad died while retreating. The confederate army pursued the Mughals and drove them out of Malwa, and thus Baz Bahadur regained his kingdom for a brief period. In 1562, Akbar sent another army led by Abdullah Khan which finally defeated Baz Bahadur, who fled to Chittor. Malwa was absorbed by the Mughals, with Baz Bahadur becoming a fugitive at various courts for a number of years. In November 1570, he surrendered to Akbar at Agra and joined his service.

Bahadur's capital was Mandu (now in Madhya Pradesh), which then became an important city in the Mughal Empire. The Jahaz Mahal is located in Mandu.

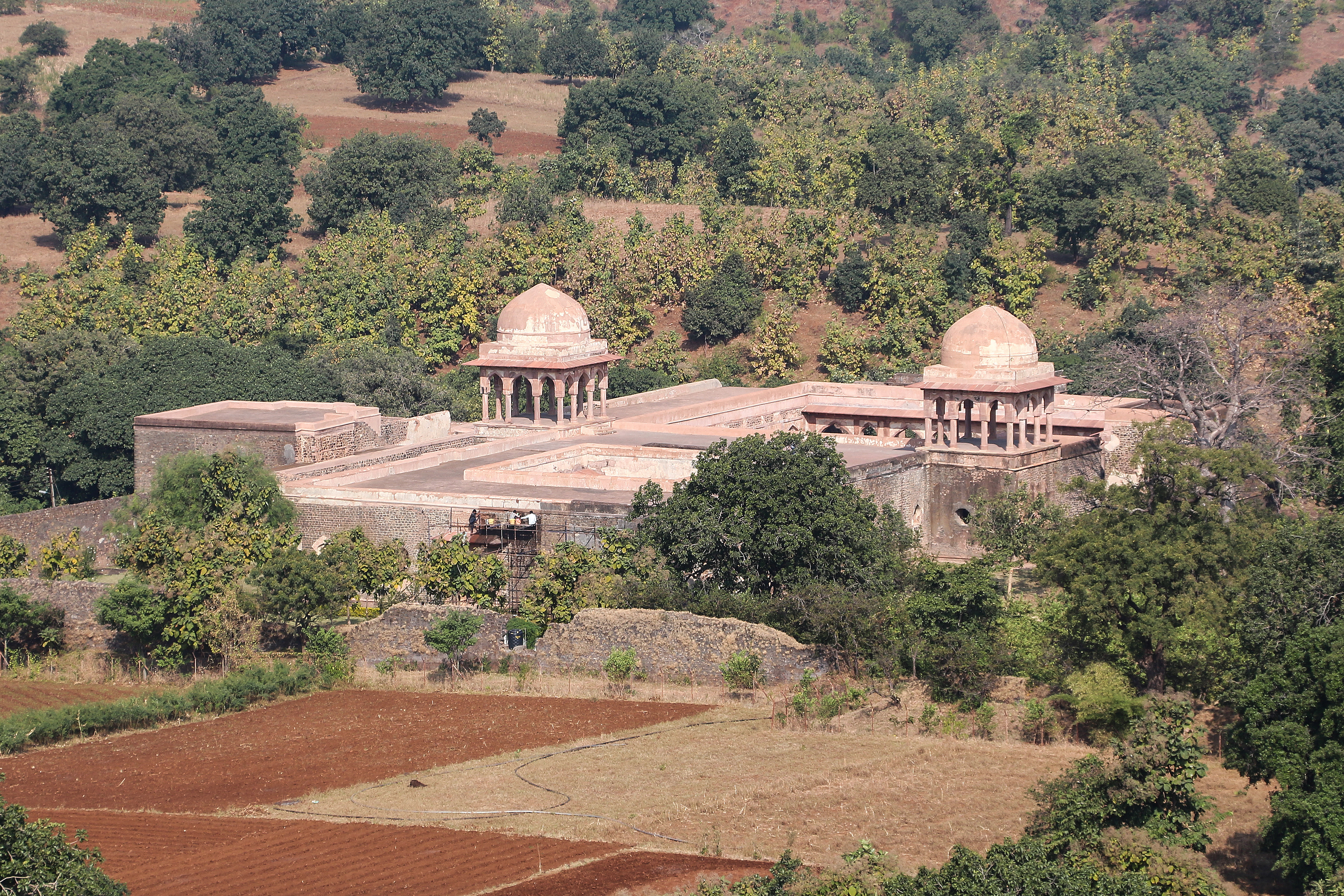
Baz Bahadur's palace in Mandu

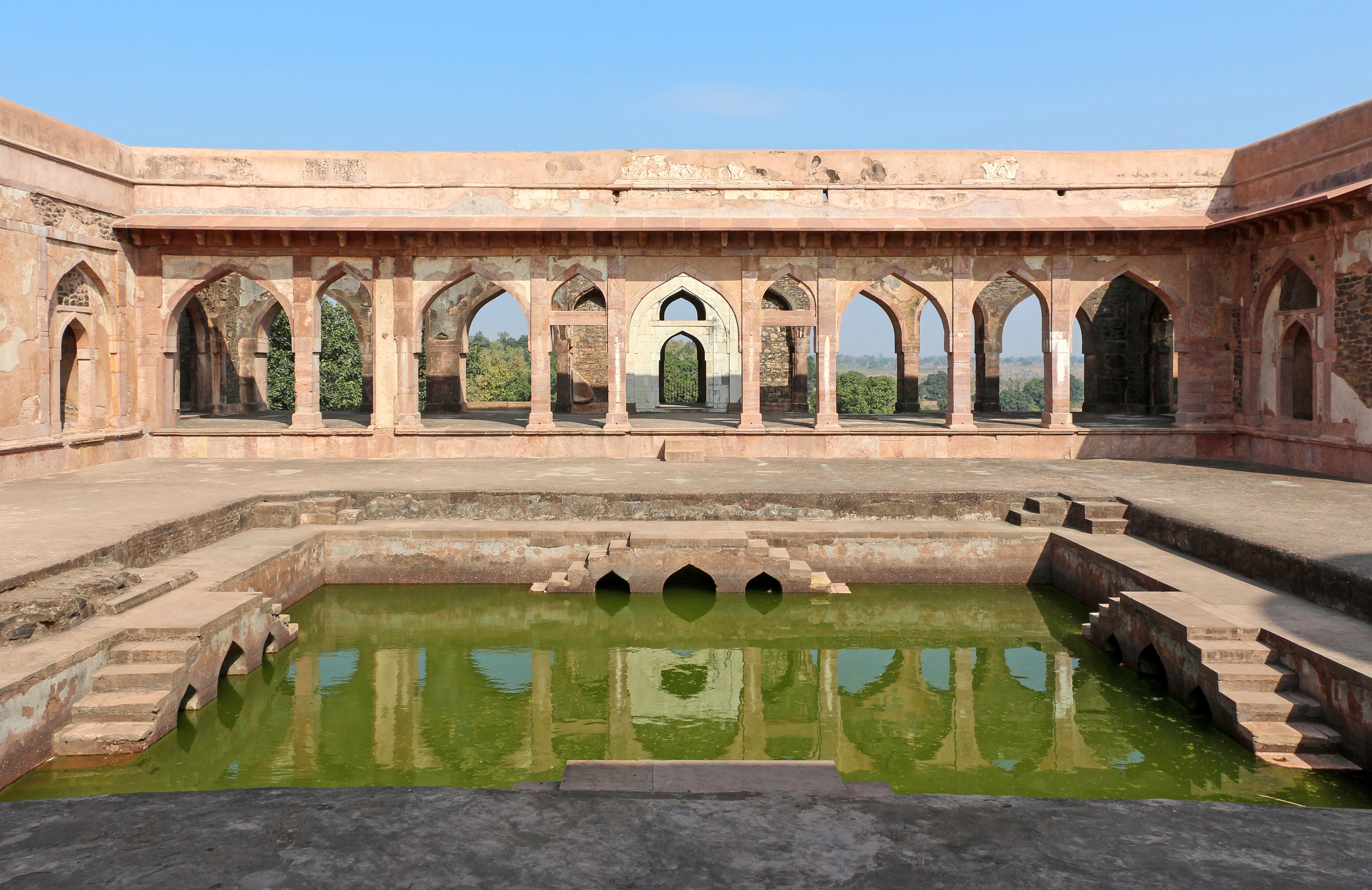
The courtyard of the palace

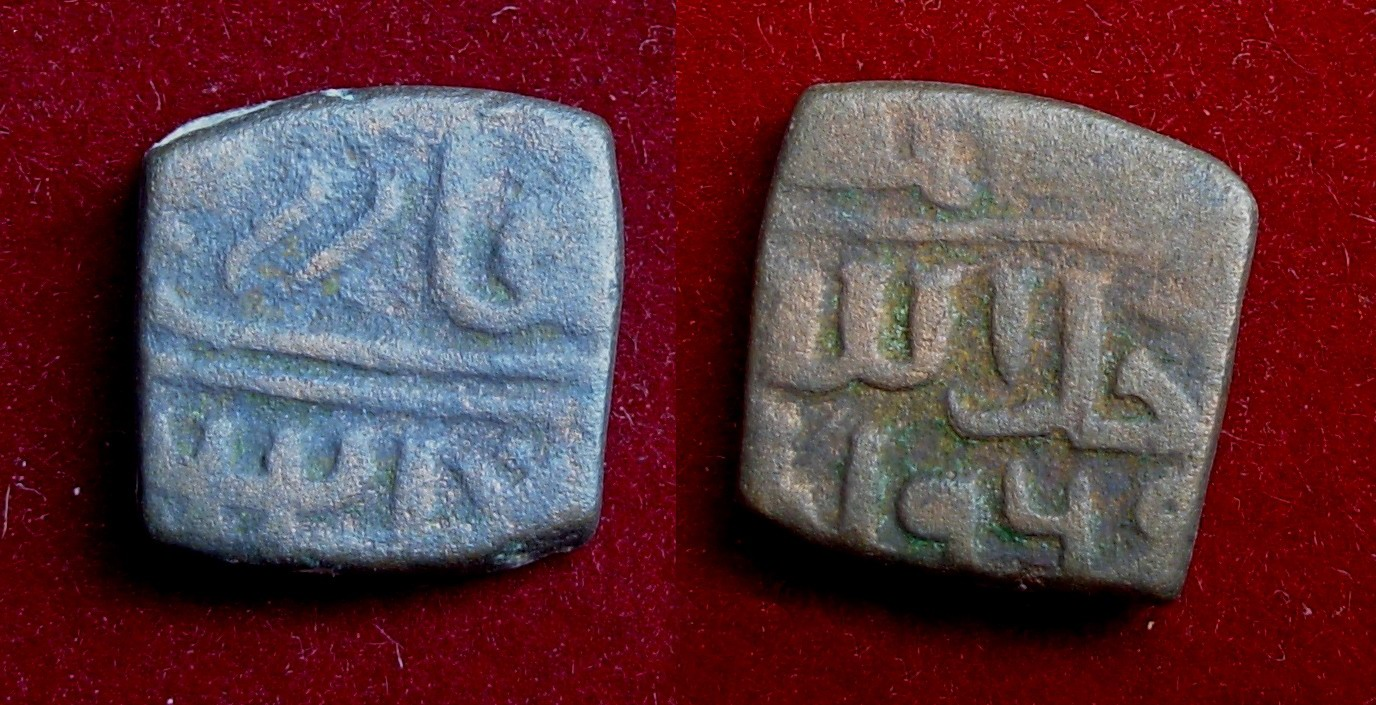
A copper coin of Baz Bahadur
