= Roopmati =

Indian poet

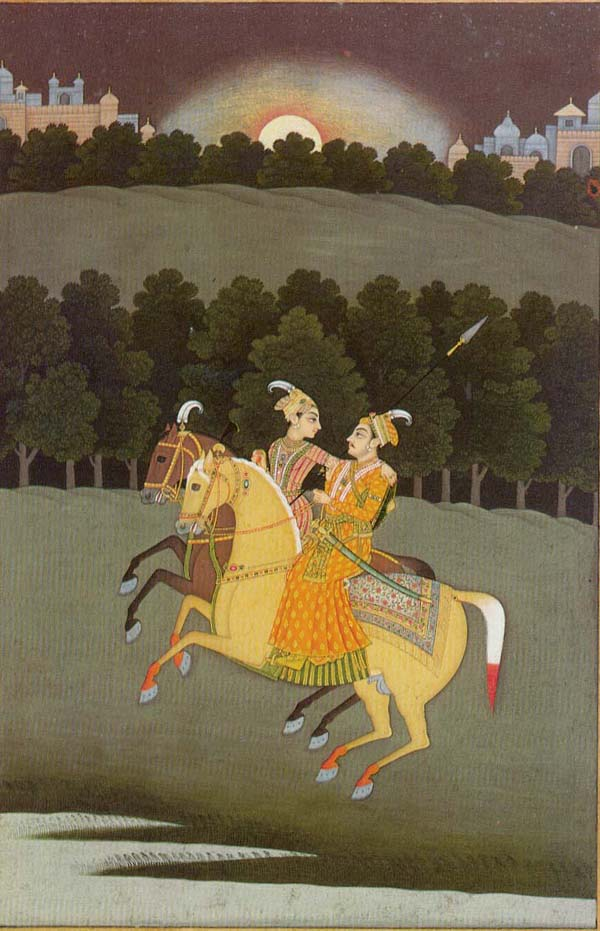
Roopmati with Baz Bahadur, Sultan of Malwa.

Rani Roopmati (died 1561), also known as Kavi Roopmati, was a poet queen of Mandu and the consort of the Sultan of Malwa, Baz Bahadur. Roopmati features prominently in the folklores of Malwa, which often describe the romance of the Sultan and his consort. She is said to have poisoned herself out of loyalty to her husband when Mandu fell to Adham Khan.

== Legend ==
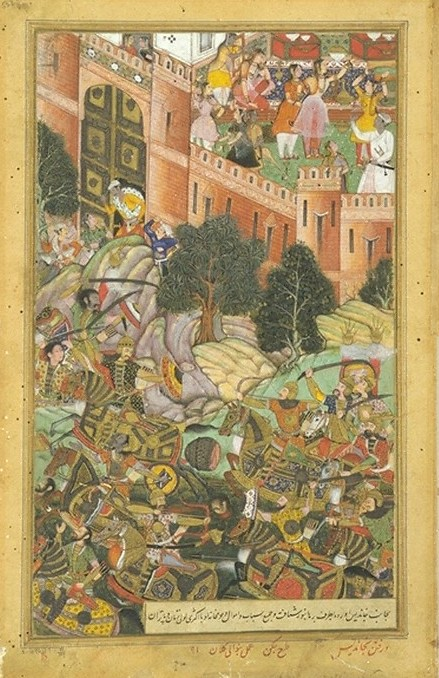
The defeat of Baz Bahadur by Mughal troops, in 1561; Rani Roopmati and her companions view the scene from the terrace of the fort. Depicted in the Akbarnama.

According to folk legends, Roopmati was the daughter of a Hindu Patel of Tanda-puri village near Mandleshwar on the right bank of Narmada. Baz Bahadur, the last independent ruler of Mandu, first time met the shepherdess Roopmati, while he was out hunting near the banks of Narmada, and she was singing with her friends. He asked her to accompany him to Mandu, and she agreed on the condition that she would live in a palace within sight of the Narmada. Baz Bahadur thus built the Rewa Kund at Mandu.

The Mughal emperor Akbar decided to conquer Mandu, and sent Adham Khan to capture the city. Adham Khan was prompted to conquer Mandu partly due to Roopmati's beauty.

In 1561, Akbar's army led by Adham Khan and Pir Muhammad Khan attacked Malwa, and easily defeated Baz Bahadur's weaker forces in the battle of Sarangpur on 29 March 1561. Bahadur fled to seek help, after which Roopmati, believing he was dead, and unwilling to submit to Adham Khan, poisoned herself.

== Poems by Roopmati ==
In 1599, Ahmad-ul-Umri Turkoman, who was in the service of Sharaf-ud-Din Mirza, wrote the story of Rani Roopmati in Persian. He collected 26 poems of her and included them in his work. The original manuscript passed to his grandson Fulad Khan and his friend Mir Jafar Ali made a copy of the manuscript in 1653. Mir Jafar Ali's copy ultimately passed to Mehbub Ali of Delhi and after his death in 1831 passed to a lady of Delhi. Jemadar Inayat Ali of Bhopal brought this manuscript from her to Agra. This manuscript later reached C.E. Luard and was translated into English by L.M. Crump under the title, The Lady of the Lotus: Rupmati, Queen of Mandu: A Strange Tale of Faithfulness in 1926. This manuscript has a collection of twelve dohas, ten kavitas and three sawaiyas of Rupmati.

== Rewa Kund and Rani Roopmati pavilion ==
The Rewa Kund is a reservoir built by Baz Bahadur in Mandu, equipped with an aqueduct to supply Roopmati's palace with water. Today, the site is revered as a holy place. Baz Bahadur's palace was constructed in the early 16th century, and is notable for its spacious courtyard fringed with halls, and high terraces. Rani Roopmati's Pavilion was built as an army observation post, and served a more romantic purpose as Roopmati's retreat. From this hilltop pavilion, the queen could see Baz Bahadur's palace, and also the River Narmada below. Rani Roopmati's double pavilion perched on the southern embattlements had a view of the Narmada valley.

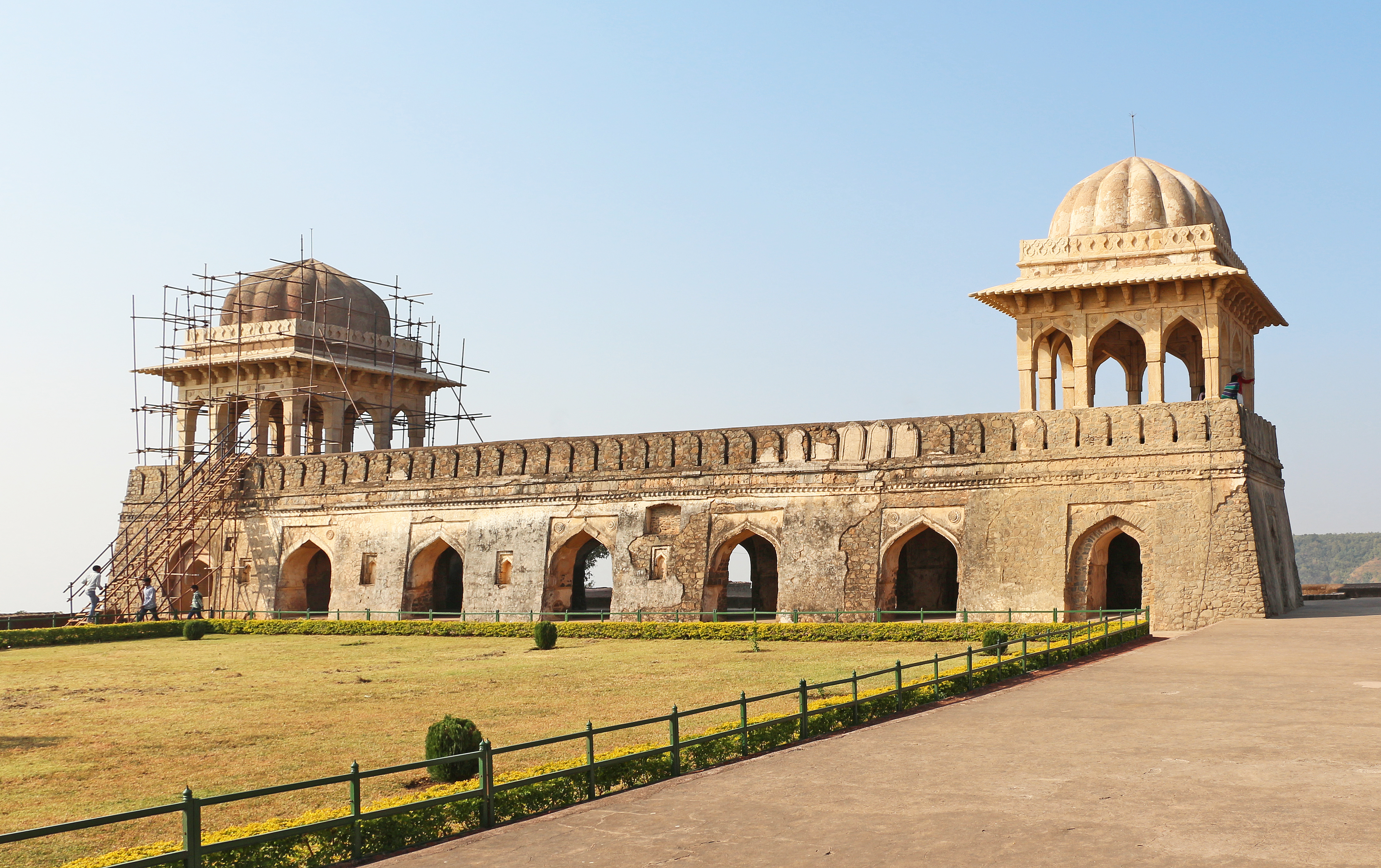
Rani Roopmati pavilion

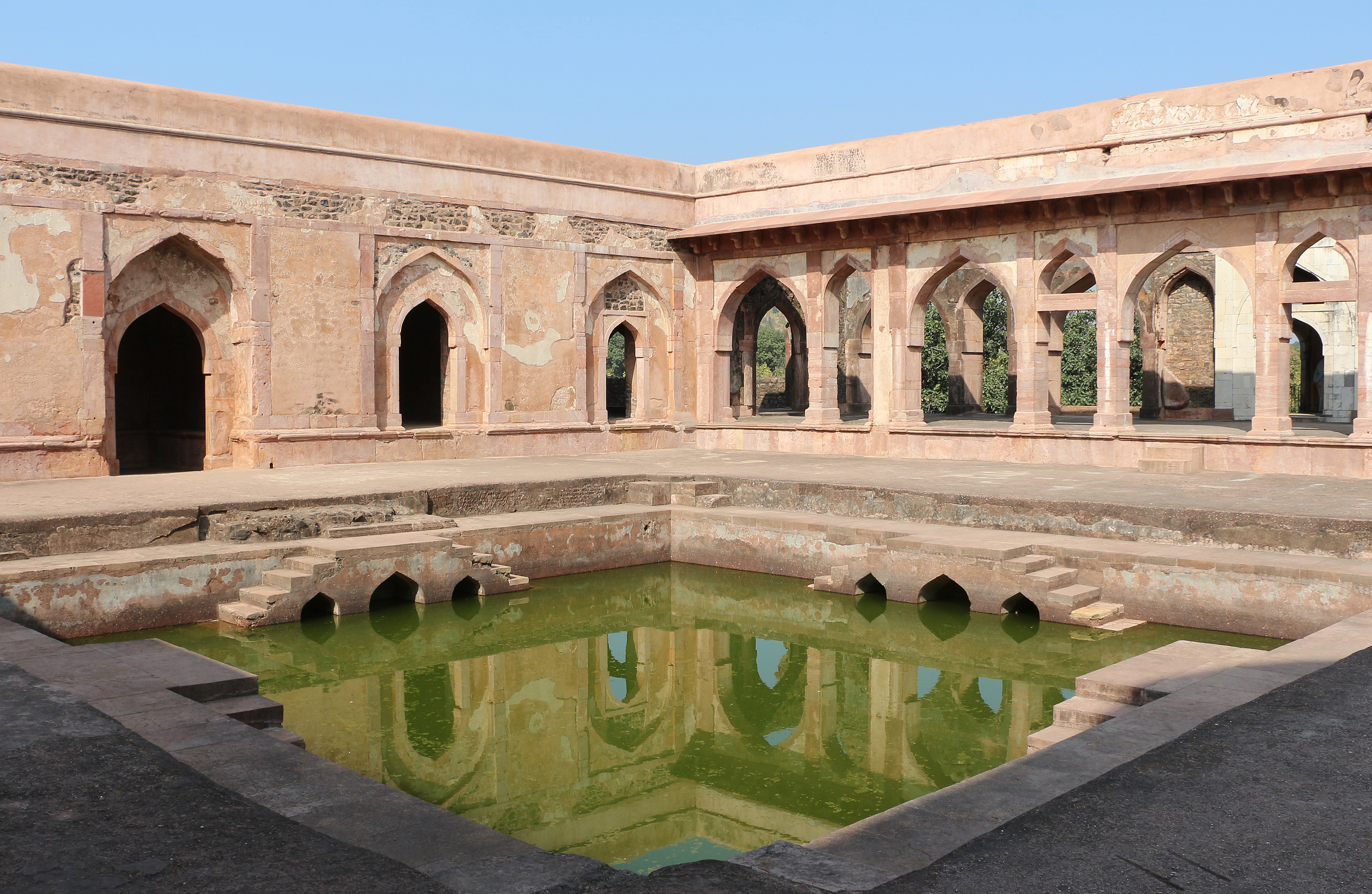
Baz Bahadur's palace

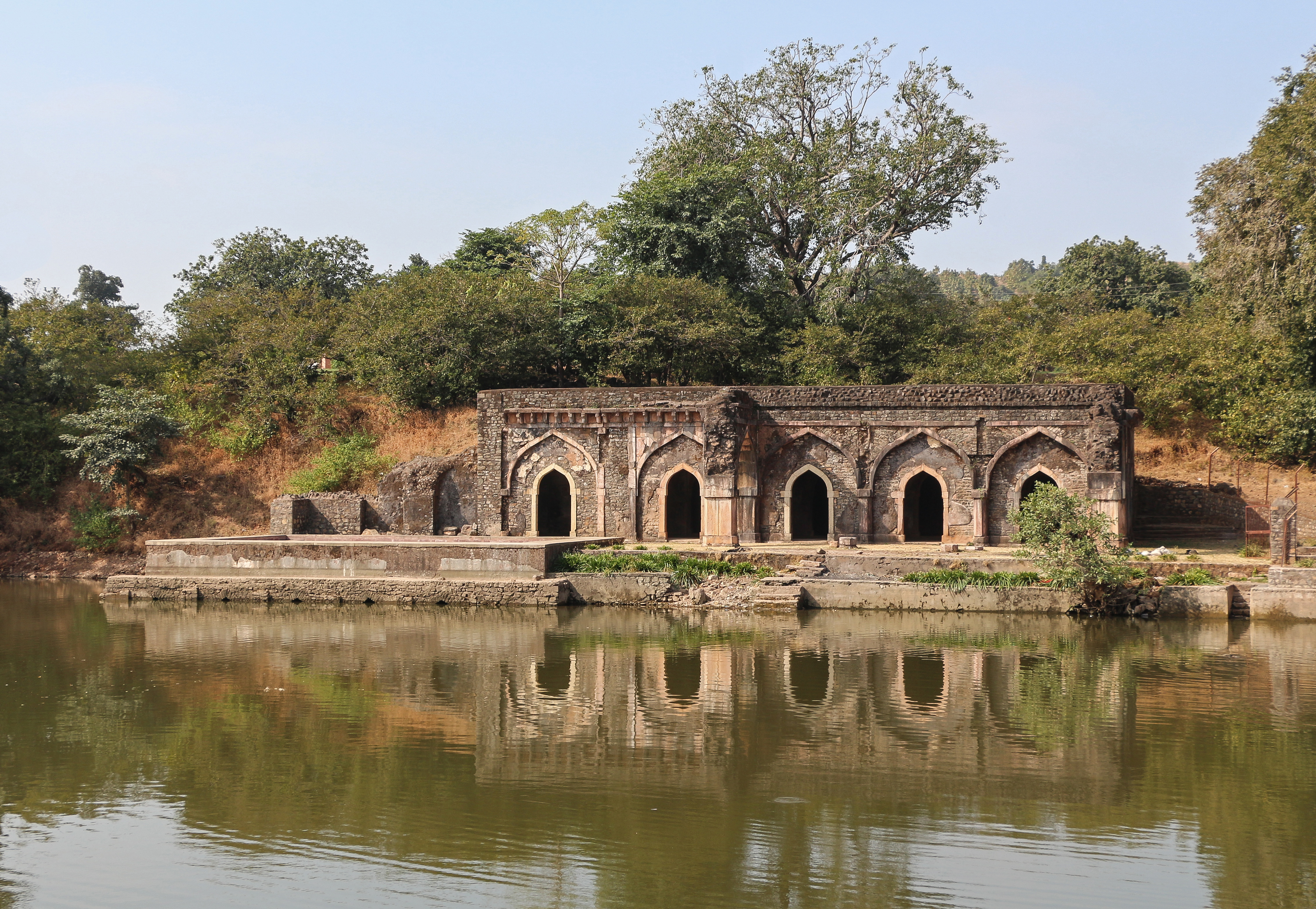
Rewa Kund

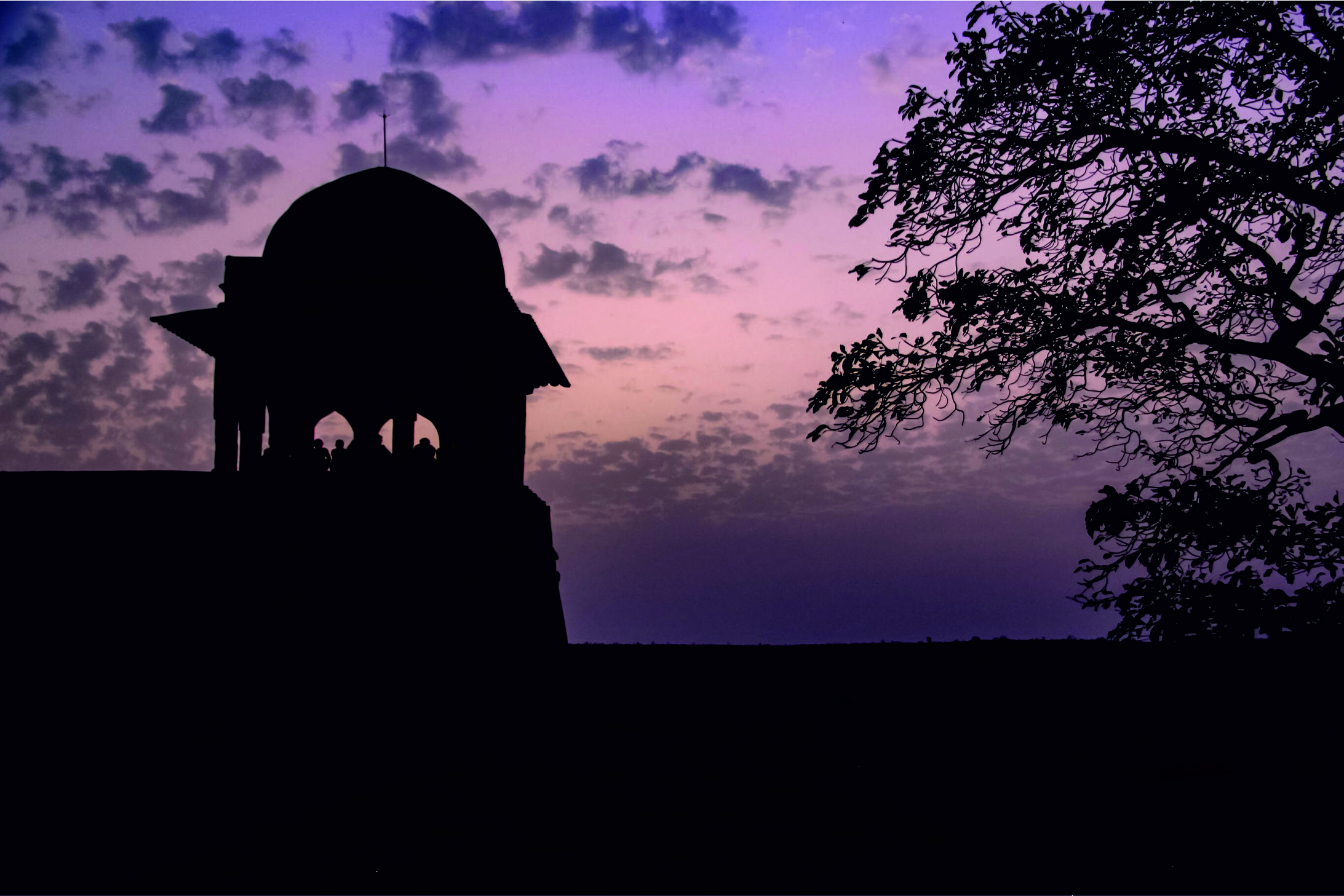
Sunset at Rani Roopmati Pavilion

== In popular culture ==
The story of Queen Roopmati has been adapted into several films in India, including: Rani Rupmati (1931) by Bhalji Pendharkar and Rani Rupmati (1959) by S.N. Tripathi starring Nirupa Roy in the titular role. Kuldip Kaur played the role of the queen, portrayed as a dacoit, in the 1952 Indian film Baiju Bawra about the titular poet during the Mughal period.
