= Daula =

Daula may refer to

- Daula (moth), a genus of moth
- Daula (month), the first month of the Mandaean calendar
- al-Dawla, an element in numerous honorific titles throughout the Islamic world
- Daula, a village in Bagpat district, Uttar Pradesh, India
- Daula, Sultanpur Lodhi, a village of Kapurthala district, Punjab State, India
- Daula, or davula, a double-headed cylindrical drum in Sri Lanka

== See also ==
- Daulat (disambiguation)
