= Daulatpur =

Daulatpur may refer to:

== In Bangladesh ==
- Daulatpur Thana, Khulna in Khulna district, in Khulna division
- Daulatpur Union, a union within Fatikchhari Upazila in Chittagong
- Daulatpur Upazila, Kushtia in Kushtia district, in Khulna division
- Daulatpur Upazila in Manikganj district
  - Daulatpur, Manikganj, a town in Daulatpur Upazila, Manikganj, well known for being the site of the:
    - Daulatpur-Salturia Tornado in 1989, the world's deadliest tornado

== In India ==
- Daulatpur, Punjab, a census town in Punjab
- Daulatpur, Bishnupur, a census town in West Bengal
- Daulatpur, Himachal Pradesh, a nagar panchayat in Himachal Pradesh
- Daulatpur, Kapurthala, a village in Kapurthala district of Punjab State, India
- Daulatpur, SBS Nagar, a village in Shaheed Bhagat Singh Nagar district of Punjab State, India
- Daulatpur, Jaisinghpur, Sultanpur, a village in Sultanpur district, Uttar Pradesh
- Daulatpur, Kadipur, a village in Sultanpur district, Uttar Pradesh

== In Nepal ==
- Daulatpur, Bheri, a Village Development Committee in Bheri Zone
- Daulatpur, Sagarmatha, a Village Development Committee in Sagarmatha Zone

== In Pakistan ==
- Daulatpur, Jhelum, a village and Union Council in Jhelum District, Pakistan
- Daulatpur, Sindh, a town in Sindh, Pakistan

== See also ==
- Daulatpur Upazila (disambiguation)
- Daulatabad (disambiguation)
- Daulat (disambiguation)
- Pur (disambiguation)
