= Doulatabad =

Doultabad, Doulatabad, or Daulatabad may refer to:

== India ==
- Daulatabad Fort, Maharashtra
- Doulatabad, Mahbubnagar, Telangana
- Doultabad, Siddipet district, Telangana
- Daulatabad, Murshidabad, West Bengal
- Doultabad, Bishnupur, West Bengal
- Daultabad, Uttar Pradesh

== Iran and Afghanistan ==
- Dowlatabad (disambiguation), a number of places

== See also ==
- Daulat (disambiguation)
- Abad (disambiguation)
- Daulatpur (disambiguation)
- Devagiri (disambiguation), former name of the fort in Maharashtra, India
