= Devagiri (disambiguation) =

Devagiri, or Daulatabad Fort, is a historic fortified citadel near Aurangabad, Maharashtra, India.

Devagiri may also refer to:

- Devagiri, Karnataka, a village in India
- Devagiri Express, a train service in Maharashtra and Telangana, India
- Devagiri hill, an elevation in Rayagada, Odisha, India
- St. Joseph's College, Devagiri, or Devagiri College, in Kozhikode, Kerala, India

== See also ==
- Daulatabad (disambiguation)
- Devgiri, another name for Mount Everest
