= Daulatpur Upazila =

Daulatpur Upazila may refer to one of two Upazilas, or subdistricts, of Bangladesh:

- Daulatpur Upazila, Manikganj
- Daulatpur Upazila, Kushtia, in Kushtia District of Khulna Division

== See also ==
- Daulatpur Thana, Khulna, in Khulna District of Khulna Division
- Daulatpur (disambiguation), places in Bangladesh, India, Nepal, and Pakistan
