= Chand Minar =

Moon tower in Maharashtra, India

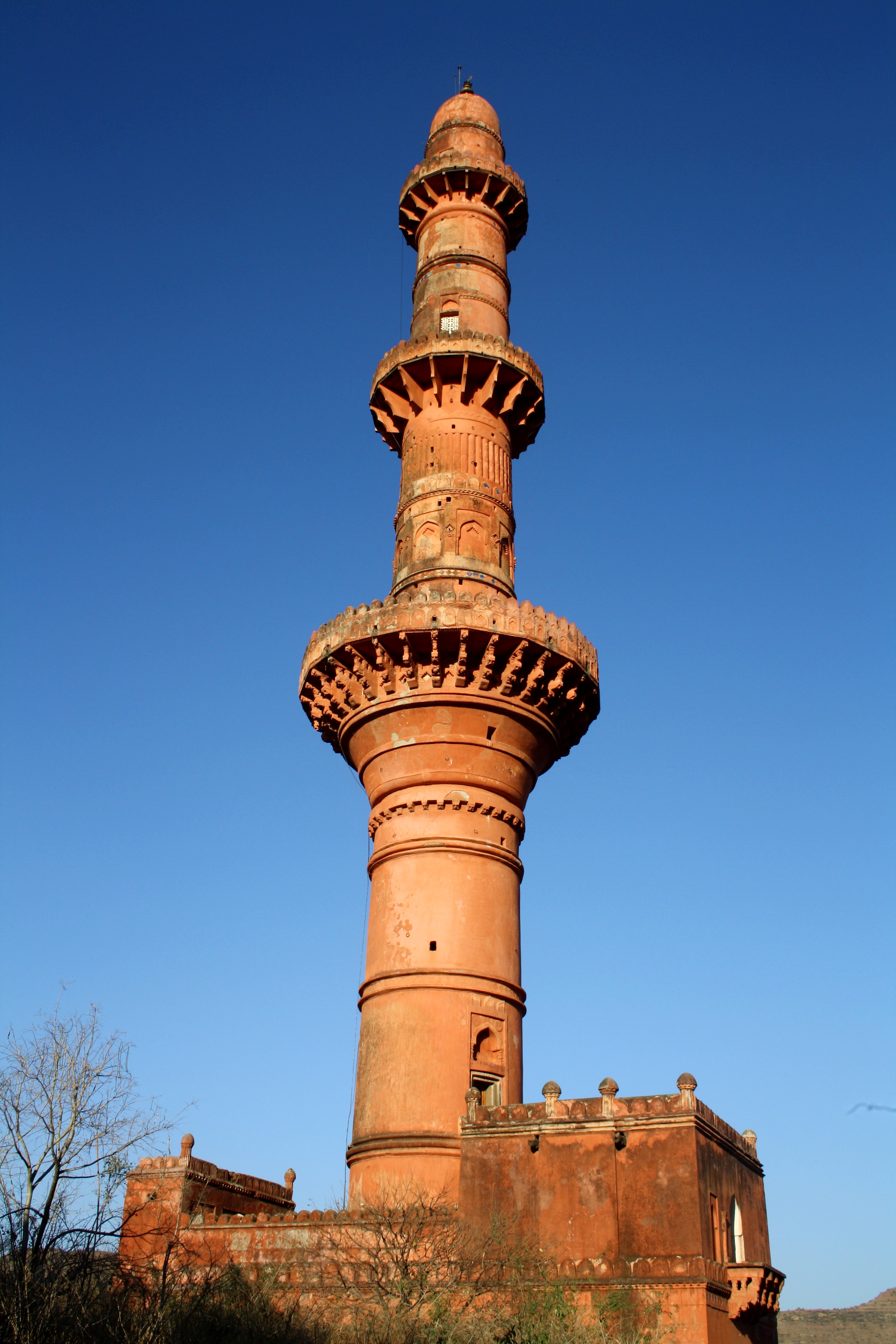
- The Tower of the Moon as viewed from Daulatabad-fort
- Interactive map of Chand Minar
- 19.944416°N 75.217429°E
- Type: Minaret
- Location: Daulatabad, Maharashtra, India

History
- Built: 1445
- Built for: Alau'd-din Ahmad Shah

Site notes
- Architectural style: Persian

The Chand Minar or the Tower of the Moon is a medieval tower in Daulatabad, India. The tower is located in the state of Maharashtra near the Daulatabad fort complex. It was erected in 1445 by a Bahmani slave and commemorated to sultan Alau'd-din Ahmad Shah of the Bahmani Sultanate to commemorate his victory against the Vijayanagara Empire in 1443. Chand Minar bears resemblance to the Qutb Minar of Delhi and was inspired from it.

The Chand Minar is considered to be among the finest specimens of Indo-Islamic architecture in Southern India. It is 63 metres high and is divided into 4 storeys and 24 chambers. A small mosque or praying hall sits at the base of the tower, which is covered with Persian blue tiles. The tower also displays some indigenous Indian architectural features such as the brackets supporting its balconies. The tower's height makes it visible from every corner of the Daulatabad Fort.

== Gallery ==
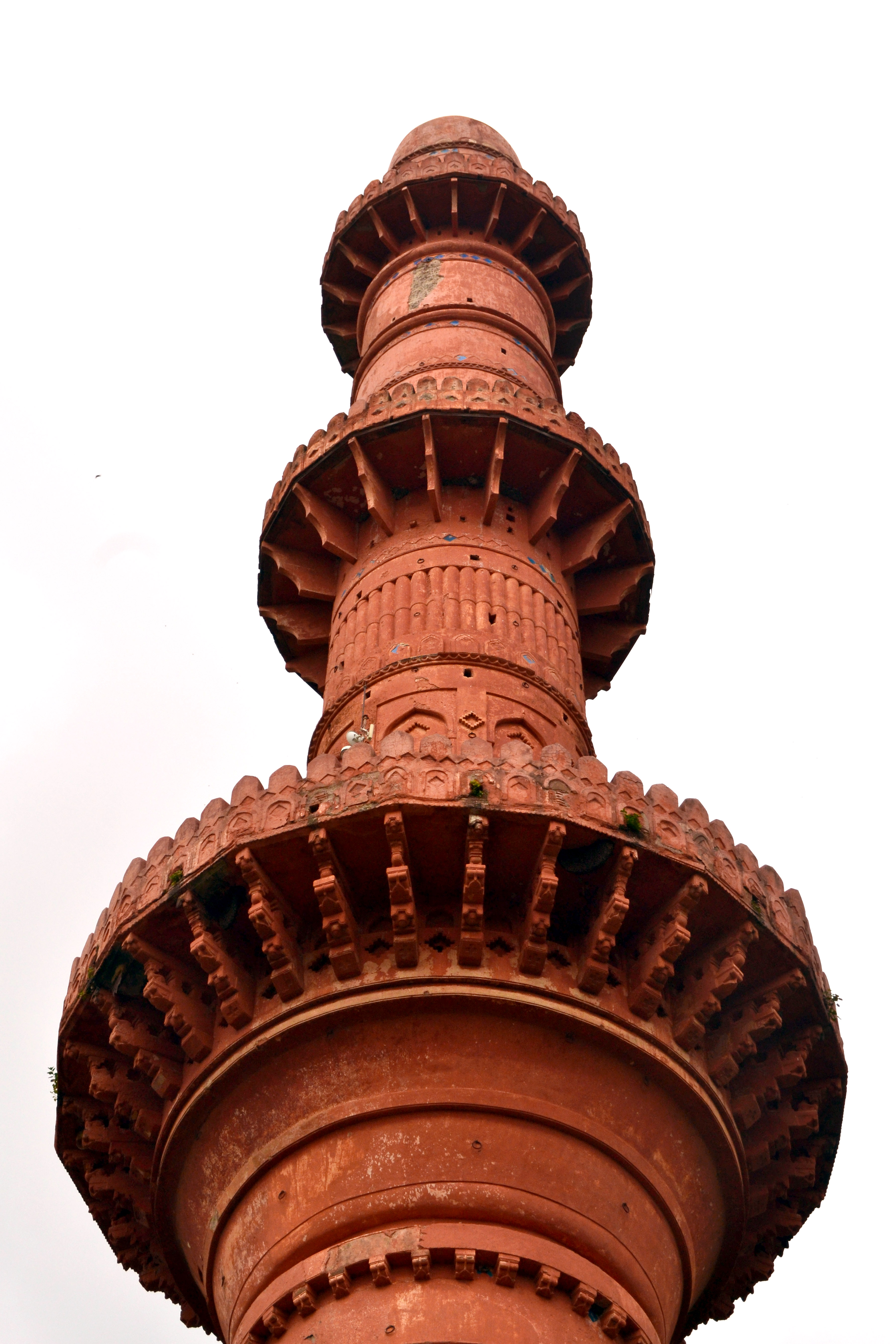

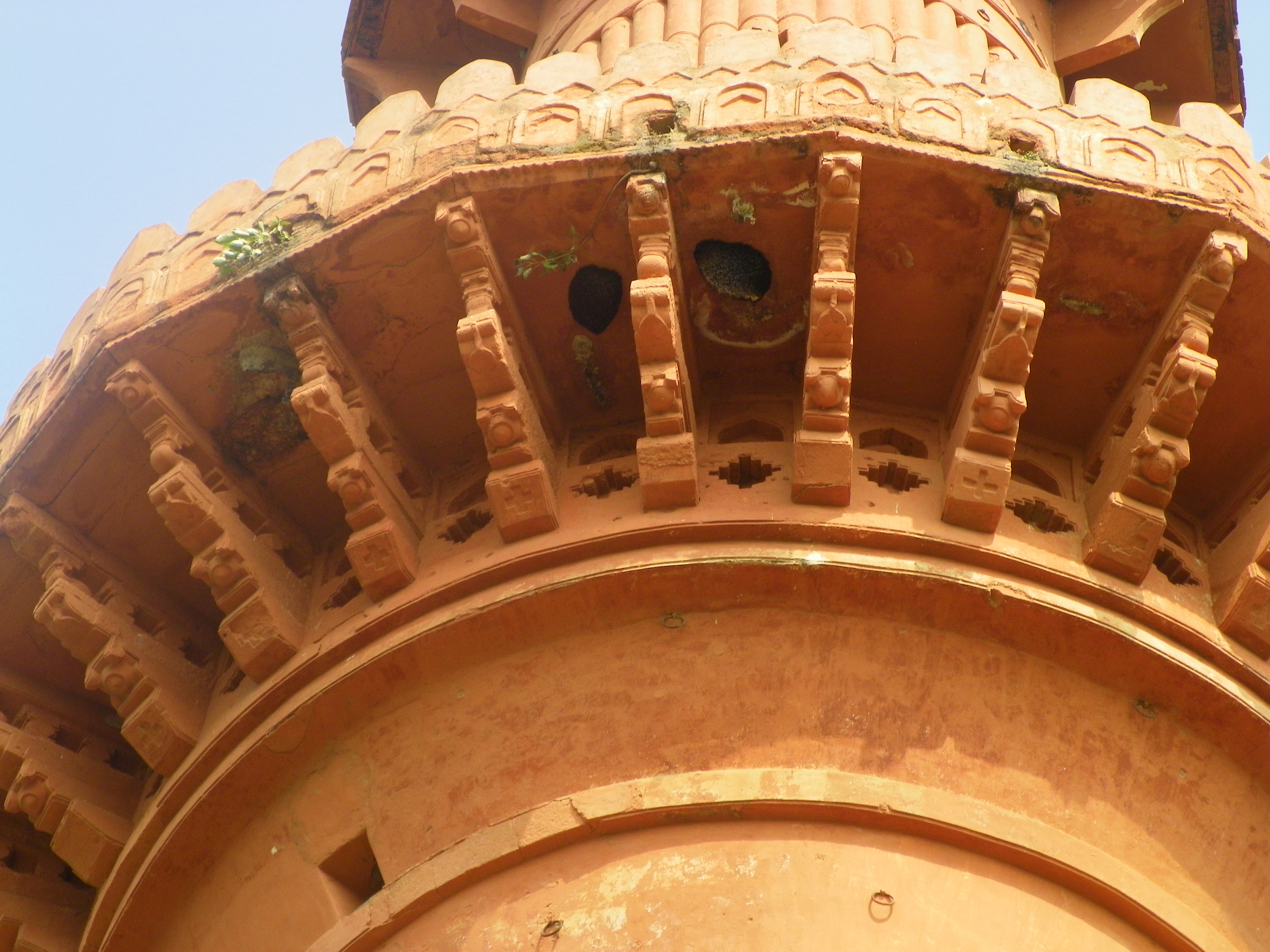

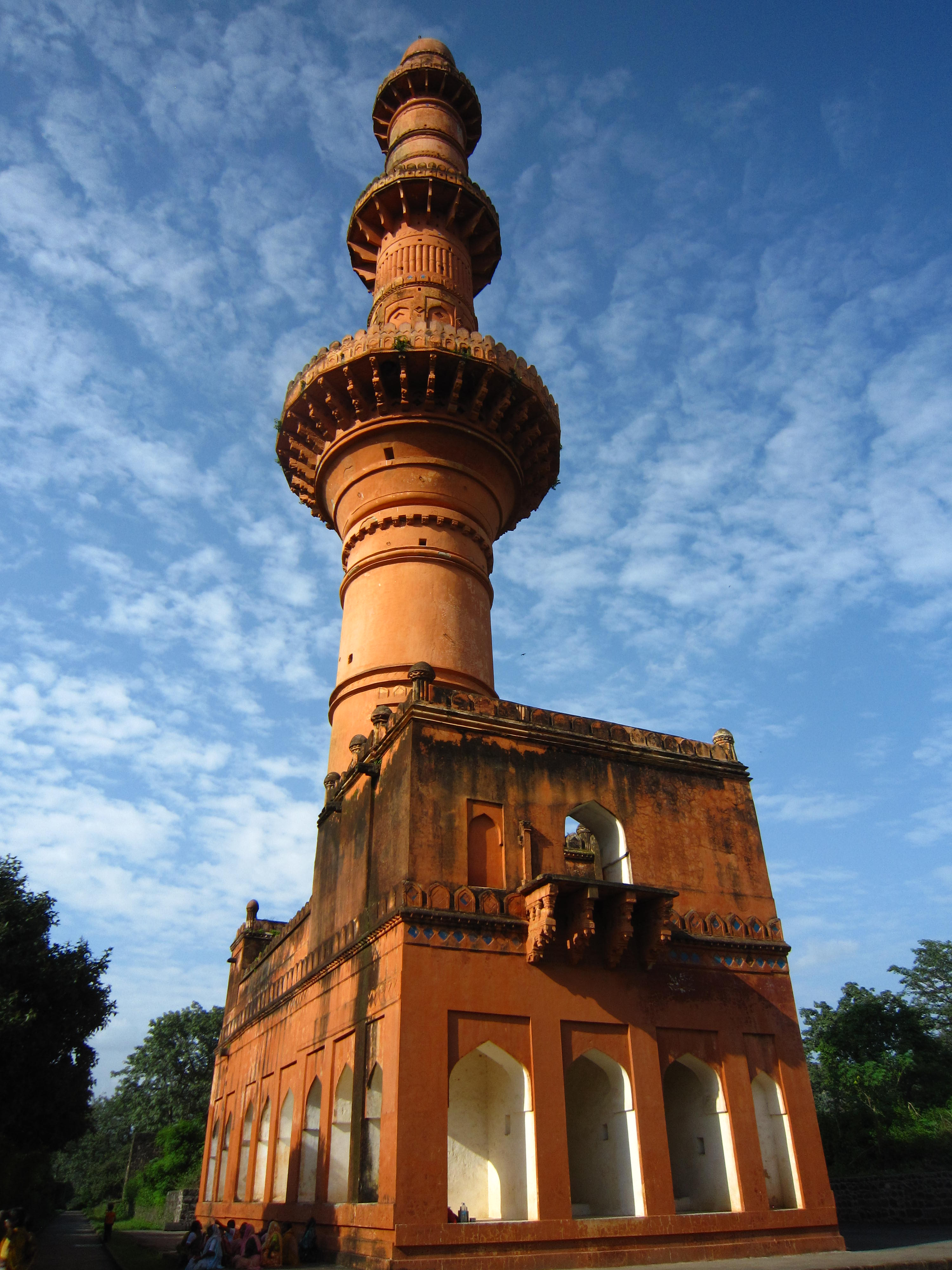
