= Daulat =

Daulat may refer to:

- Daulat (painter), Mughal painter
- Daulat (1949 film), an Indian film by Sohrab Modi
- Daulat (1982 film), an Indian film by Mohan Segal
- Daulat (2020 film), a Malaysian film
- Daulat Beg Oldi, Indian military base in Ladakh

== People with the given name ==
- Daulat Khan Lodi, 16th-century governor of Lahore
- Daulat Rao Sindhia, Maharaja of Gwalior (d. 1827)
- Daulat Singh Kothari (1905–1993), Indian scientist

== See also ==
- Daula (disambiguation)
- Daulatabad (disambiguation)
- Daulatpur (disambiguation)
- al-Dawla
