= Daulatpur, Saptari =

Former Village Development Committee in Nepal

Daulatpur Surunga Nagarpalika 3 दौलतपुर लक्ष्मीपुर
- Village development committee
- Nickname: लक्ष्मीपुर
- Location in Nepal
- Coordinates: 26.72°N 86.53°E
- Country: Nepal
- Zone: Sagarmatha Zone
- District: Saptari District

Government
  - Type: Chair person : Ram Narayan Chaudhary Basanta Kumar Neupane

Population (2011)
  - Total: 4,775
- Time zone: UTC+5:45 (Nepal Time)

Daulatpur is a village development committee in Saptari District in the Sagarmatha Zone of south-eastern Nepal. At the time of the 2011 Nepal census it had a population of 4,775 people living in 999 individual households.
