= Daulatpur, Kapurthala =

Daulatpur
- Village
- Location in Punjab, India Daulatpur (India)
- Coordinates: 31.429793°N 75.627355°E
- Country: India
- State: Punjab
- District: Kapurthala

Government
  - Type: Panchayati raj (India)
  - Body: Gram panchayat

Population (2011)
  - Total: 128
- Sex ratio 68/60♂/♀

Languages
  - Official: Punjabi
  - Other spoken: Hindi
- Time zone: UTC+5:30 (IST)
- PIN: 144620
- Telephone code: 01822
- ISO 3166 code: IN-PB
- Vehicle registration: PB-09
- Website: kapurthala.gov.in

Daulatpur is a village in Kapurthala district of Punjab State, India. It is located 8 kilometres (5.0 mi) from Kapurthala, which is both district and sub-district headquarters of Daulatpur. The village is administrated by a Sarpanch.

== Demography ==
According to the report published by Census India in 2011, Daulatpur has a total number of 26 houses and population of 128 of which include 68 males and 60 females. Literacy rate of Daulatpur is 79.41%, higher than state average of 75.84%. The population of children under the age of 6 years is 26 which is 20.31% of total population of Daulatpur, and child sex ratio is approximately 1000, higher than state average of 846.

== Caste ==
The village has schedule caste (SC) constitutes 39.06% of total population of the village and it doesn't have any Schedule Tribe (ST) population,

== Population data ==
Particulars	Total	Male	Female
Total No. of Houses	26	-	-
Population	128	68	60
Child (0-6)	26	13	13
Schedule Caste	50	27	23
Schedule Tribe	0	0	0
Literacy	79.41%	80.00%	78.72%
Total Workers	34	29	5
Main Worker	30	0	0
Marginal Worker	4	2	2

== Air travel connectivity ==
The closest airport to the village is Sri Guru Ram Dass Jee International Airport.
