= Daulatabad Fort =

12th-century fort in Maharashtra, India

- Daulatabad, Aurangabad District, Maharashtra
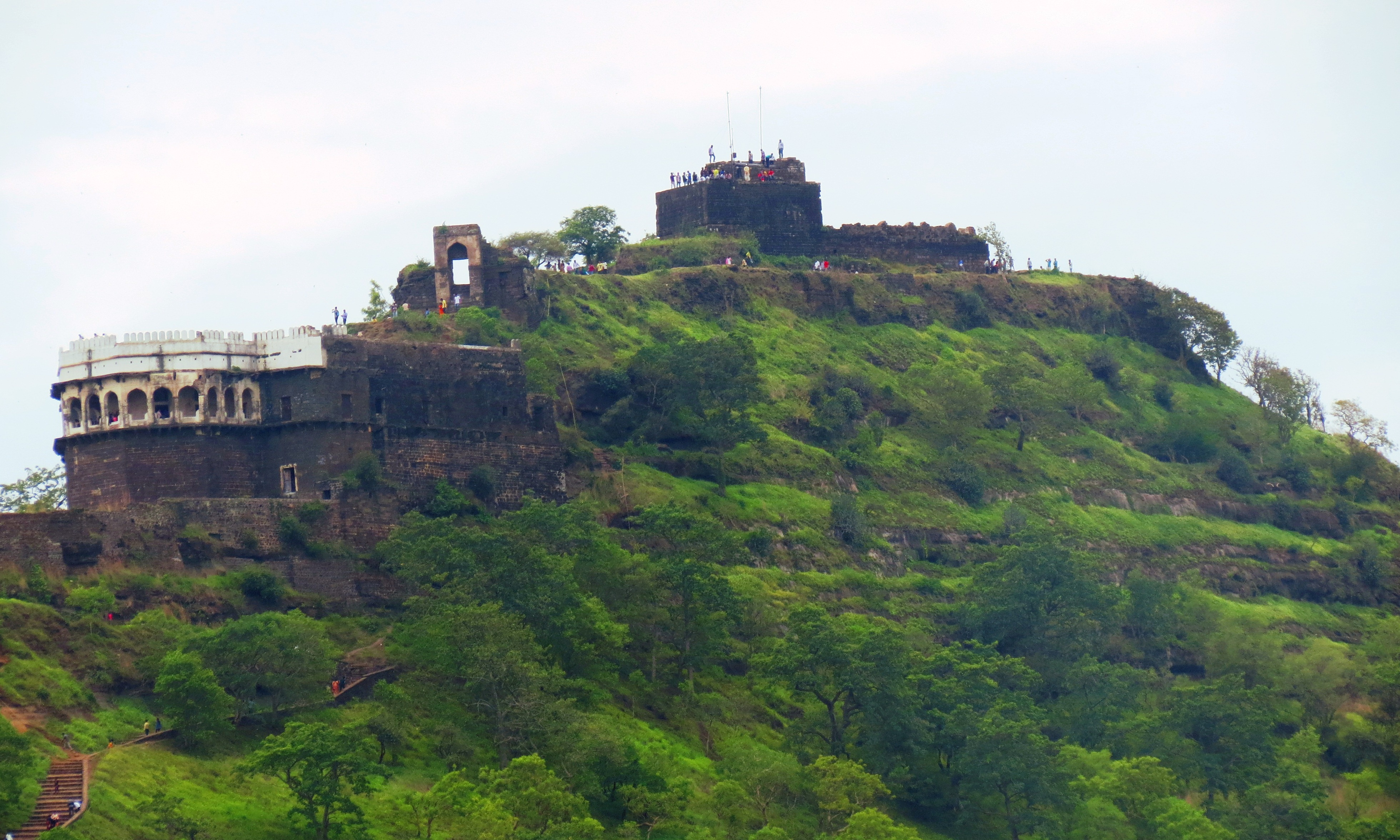

Site information
- Type: Fort
- Owner: Government of India
- Open to the public: Yes

Location
- Coordinates: 19.942724°N 75.213164°E

Site history
- Built: 1187

Daulatabad Fort, originally Devagiri Fort, is a historic fortified citadel located in Daulatabad village near Aurangabad, Maharashtra, India. It was the capital of the Yadavas (9th century – 14th century CE), for a brief time the capital of the Delhi Sultanate (1327–1334), and later a secondary capital of the Ahmadnagar Sultanate (1499–1636).

Around the 6th century CE, Devagiri emerged as an important uplands town near present-day Aurangabad, along caravan routes going towards western and southern India. The historical triangular fortress in the city was initially built around 1187 by the first Yadava monarch, Bhillama V. In 1308, the city was annexed by Alauddin Khalji of the Delhi Sultanate, which ruled over some parts of northern India. In 1327, Muhammad bin Tughluq of the Delhi Sultanate renamed Devagiri as Daulatabad and shifted his imperial capital to the city from Delhi, ordering a mass migration of Delhi's population to the now Daulatabad. However, Muhammad bin Tughluq reversed his decision in 1334 and the capital of the Delhi Sultanate was shifted back to Delhi.

In 1499, Devagiri, already renamed Daulatabad, became part of the Ahmadnagar Sultanate, who used it as their secondary capital. In 1610, near Daulatabad Fort, the new city of Aurangabad, then named Khadki, was established to serve as the capital of the Ahmadnagar Sultanate by the Ethiopian military leader Malik Ambar, who was brought to India as a slave but rose to become a popular Prime Minister of the Ahmadnagar Sultanate. Most of the present-day fortifications at Daulatabad Fort were constructed under the Ahmadnagar Sultanate.

== Fort ==
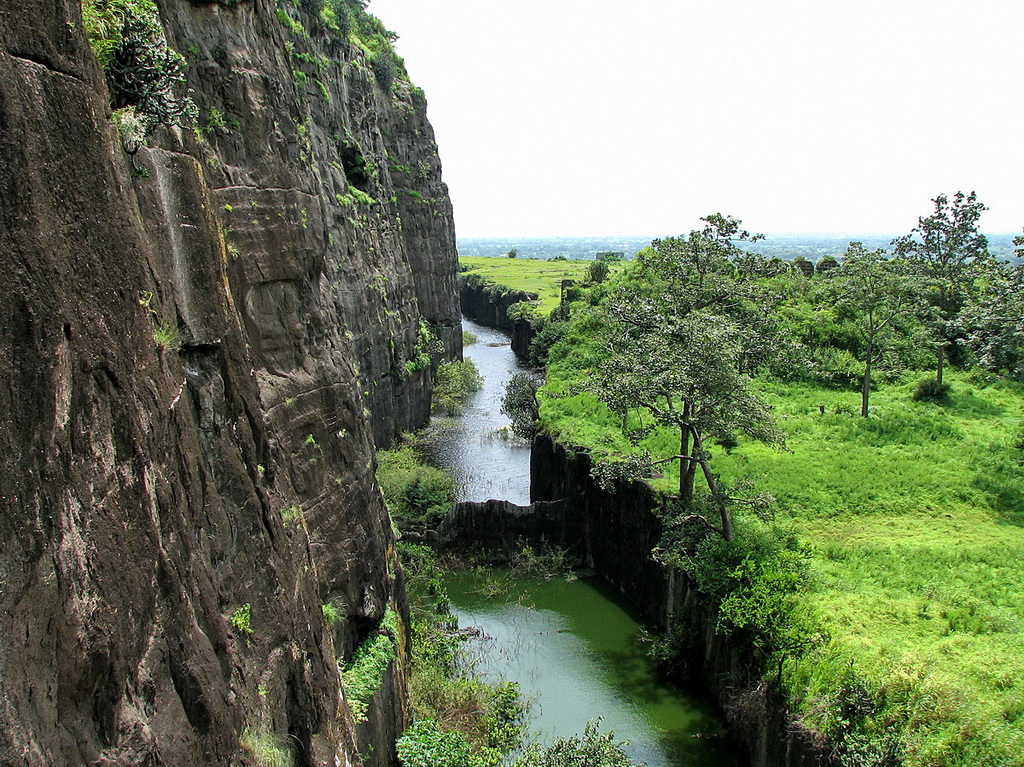
Daulatabad Fort surrounded by a moat (Khandak) filled with water. In ancient times, crocodiles were said to have been kept in the moat for protection from enemy attacks.

The area of the city is the hill-fortress of Devagiri (sometimes Latinised to Deogiri). It stands on a conical hill, about 200 metres high. Much of the lower slopes of the hill have been cut away by the Yadava dynasty rulers to leave 50-metre vertical sides to improve defences. The only means of access to the summit is by a narrow bridge, with the passage for no more than two people abreast, and a long gallery, excavated in the rock, which has, for the most part, a very gradual upward slope.

About midway along this gallery, the access gallery has steep stairs, the top of which is covered by a grating intended to form the hearth of a huge fire kept burning by the garrison above in times of war. At the summit, and at intervals on the slope, are specimens of massive old cannon facing out over the surrounding countryside. Also at the midway, there is a cave entrance meant to confuse the enemies.

The fort had the following specialties which are listed along with their advantages:

1. No separate exit from the fort, only one entrance/exit - This is designed to confuse the enemy soldiers to drive deep into the fort in search of an exit, at their own peril.
2. No parallel gates - This is designed to break the momentum of the invading army. Also, the flag mast is on the left hill, which the enemy will try to capture, thus will always turn left. But the real gates of the fort are on the right & the false ones on the left, thus confusing the enemy.
3. Spikes on the gates - In the era before gunpowder, intoxicated war elephants were used as battering rams to break open the gates. The presence of spikes ensured that the elephants died of injury.
4. Complex arrangement of entryways, curved walls, false doors - designed to confuse the enemy. False, but well-designed gates on the left side lured the enemy soldiers in & trapped them inside, eventually feeding them to crocodiles.
5. The hill is shaped to discourage climbing, though historical sources on its specific design features are unclear.

== City ==
Daulatabad (19°57'N 75°15'E) is located at a distance of 16 km northwest of Aurangabad, the district headquarters and midway to the Ellora Caves. The original widespread capital city is now mostly unoccupied and has been reduced to a village. Much of its survival depends on the tourists to the old city and the adjacent fort.

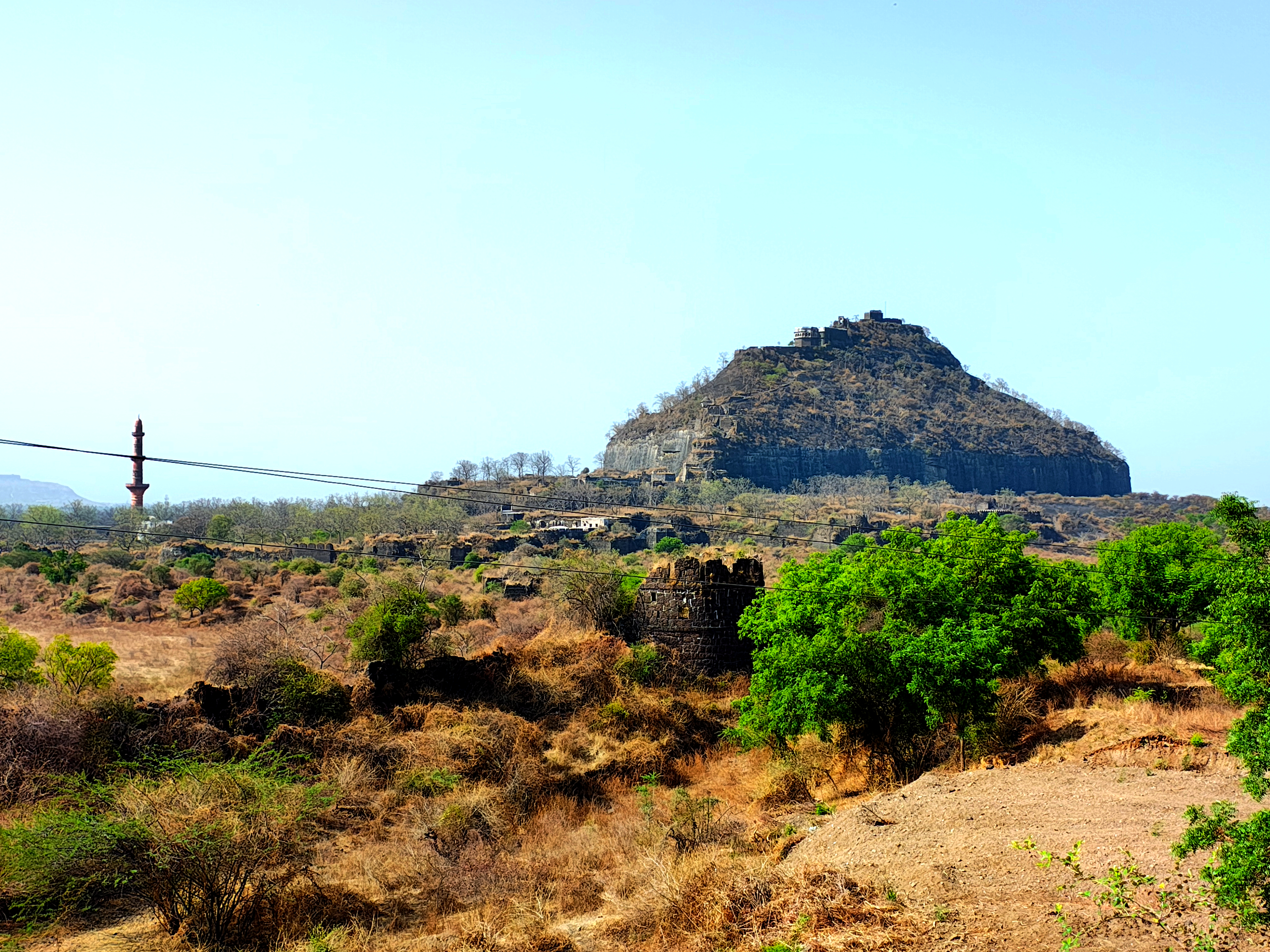
Daulatabad Fort from MH SH 22 View Point

== History ==
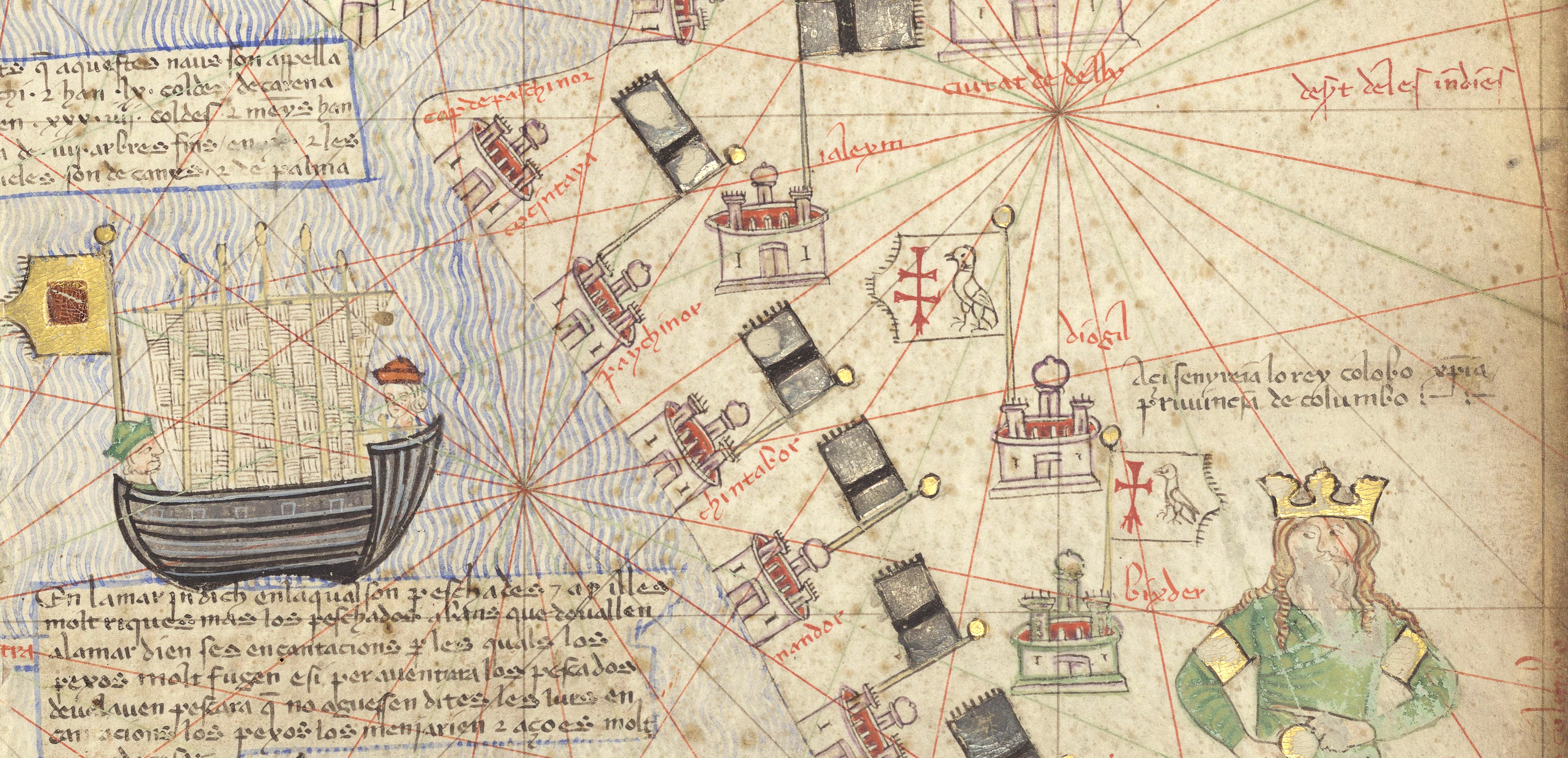
Western coast of India, with the traditional Yadava capital of Diogil ("Deogiri", or Devagiri) at the center, in the Catalan Atlas (1375). On top of the city of Diogil floats a peculiar flag, while coastal cities are under the black flag of the Delhi Sultanate. Devagiri was ultimately captured by Alauddin Khalji in 1307. The trading ship raises the flag of the Ilkhanate.

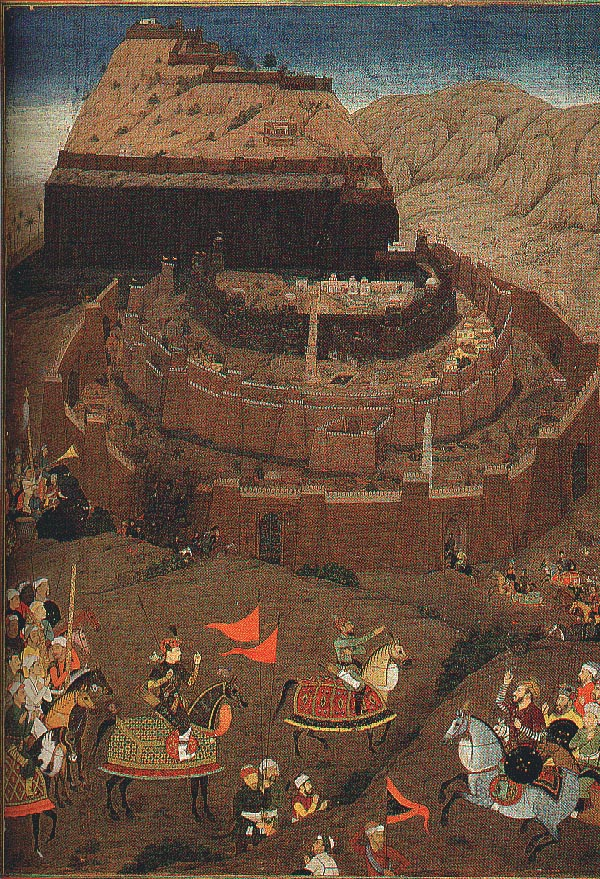
The Mughal Army captures Daulatabad Fort in the Siege of Daulatabad.

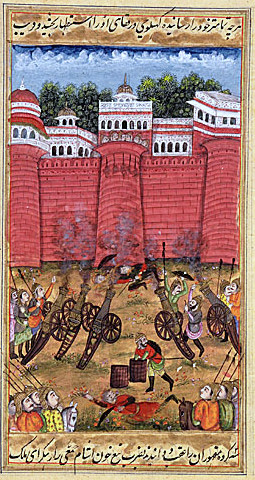
Capture of Daulatabad Fort in 1633.

The site had been occupied since at least 100 BC, and now has remains of Hindu and Jain temples similar to those at Ajanta and Ellora. A series of niches carved with Jain Tirthankara in cave 32.

The city is said to have been founded c. 1187 by Bhillama V, a Yadava prince who renounced his allegiance to the Chalukyas and established the power of the Yadava dynasty in the west. During the rule of the Yadava king Ramachandra, Alauddin Khalji of the Delhi Sultanate raided Devagiri in 1296, forcing the Yadavas to pay a hefty tribute. When the tribute payments stopped, Alauddin sent a second expedition to Devagiri in 1308, forcing Ramachandra to become his vassal.

In 1328, Muhammad bin Tughluq of the Delhi sultanate transferred the capital of his kingdom to Devagiri, and renamed it Daulatabad. The sultan made Daulatabad (Devagiri) his second capital in 1327. Some scholars argue that the idea behind transferring the capital was rational, because it lay more or less in the centre of the kingdom, and geographically secured the capital from the north-west frontier attacks.

In the Daulatabad fort, Tughluq found the area arid and dry. His capital-shift strategy failed miserably. Hence he shifted back to Delhi and earned the moniker "Mad King".

The next important event in the Daulatabad fort time-line was the construction of the Chand Minar by the Bahmani Sultan Hasan Gangu Bahmani, also known as Ala-ud-Din Bahman Shah (r. 3 August 1347 – 11 February 1358).

Hasan Gangu built the Chand Minar as a replica of the Qutb Minar of Delhi, of which he was a great fan. He employed Iranian architects to build the Minar, who used lapis lazuli and red ocher for coloring. Currently, the Minar is out of bounds for tourists, because of a suicide case.

The Chini Mahal, located further inside the fort, is believed to date back to the Ahmadnagar Sultanate. Later, it was repurposed as a prison by the Mughals, reputedly holding Abul Hasan Qutb Shah of the Sultanate of Golconda of Hyderabad.

Most of the present-day fortification was constructed under the Bahmani Kingdom and the Ahmadnagar Sultanate. The Mughal Governor of the Deccan under Shah Jahan, captured the fortress in 1632 and imprisoned the Ahmadnagar Sultanate prince.

It was captured by the Maratha Empire in 1760.

== Legend ==
In Hindu lore, Lord Shiva is believed to have stayed on the hills surrounding this region. Hence the fort was originally known as Devagiri, literally meaning "hills of god".

== Structure ==
Daulatabad is a fortified city that is the cumulative result of 1000 years of building history, overseen by successive rulers of the Deccan. It can be divided into three distinct zones: Balakot, the innermost fortification atop the conical hill itself; Kataka, the intermediate fortification; and Ambarkot, the outermost defense wall which encloses most of the historic city.

=== Balakot ===
Balakot is the name given to the rock fort upon the conical Deogiri hill, and was termed so by the Tughluqs. The Yadavas initiated this fortification by scarping the slopes of the hill until they were vertical, rising 50m above ground, and excavated a deep moat at the base of the hill. The Balakot site contains a number of palatial buildings. The most notable is the Chini Mahal, dating to the Nizam Shahi dynasty. There is no evidence tying it to any specific builder; it likely originates from the early days of the dynasty, and takes its name from blue/white tiles set into its facade. The palace is in a crumbling state, and currently survives as a long hall, with an entrance on one side. The palace may have been larger in the past, but was destroyed by the Mughals and converted into a prison.

Beneath the northern flank of Balakot is a derelict palace building of the Mughal emperor Shah Jahan, built after the Mughal capture of the fort in 1633. It consists of two large courts, an apartment building towards the west, and a hammam. Another pavilion of Shah Jahan is found beneath the summit of Balakot. Balakot also contains a ruined royal residence dating to the 15th century, built by the Bahmani dynasty during its early days.

=== Kataka ===
Kataka is a circular, intermediary fort at the Daulatabad site. It was built by Tughluq commanders as an expansion to Balakot, occupying its northern and eastern flanks, adjoining the base of the Devagiri hill. The defensive wall is a massive double rampart, featuring bastions and moats. Lying just outside the eastern entrance of the wall is a Mughal-era hammam. A notable structure within Kataka is the large Jami mosque of Daulatabad, which dates to 1318. A short distance away is the Chand Minar. Located within a sector of the fort called Mahakot, it is an exceptionally tall tower built by Alauddin Bahmani in 1446 to commemorate his capture of Daulatabad. Its base is concealed by a small structure, which contains a mosque.

=== Ambarkot ===
Ambarkot is the outermost defence wall at the Daulatabad site, enclosing most of the historic city. It is typically attributed to Malik Ambar, minister of the Nizam Shahis, but may have been built by the Tughluqs. It is elliptical in shape, and spans two kilometres north to south. Similar to Kataka, the Ambarkot rampart consists of two defence walls. Scholar Pushkar Sohoni notes that there are a number of historic structures around the Ambarkot walls that have not been investigated yet.

== Transport ==
=== Road Transport ===
Daulatabad is in the outskirts of Aurangabad, and is on the Aurangabad - Ellora road (National Highway 2003). Aurangabad is well connected by road and 20 km away from Devagiri.

=== Rail Transport ===
Daulatabad railway station is located on the Manmad-Purna section of South Central Railways and also on the Mudkhed-Manmad section of the Nanded Division of South Central Railway. Until reorganisation in 2005, it was a part of the Hyderabad Division Aurangabad is a major station near Daulatabad. The Devagiri Express regularly operates between Mumbai and Secunderabad, Hyderabad, via the city of Aurangabad.

== Gallery ==
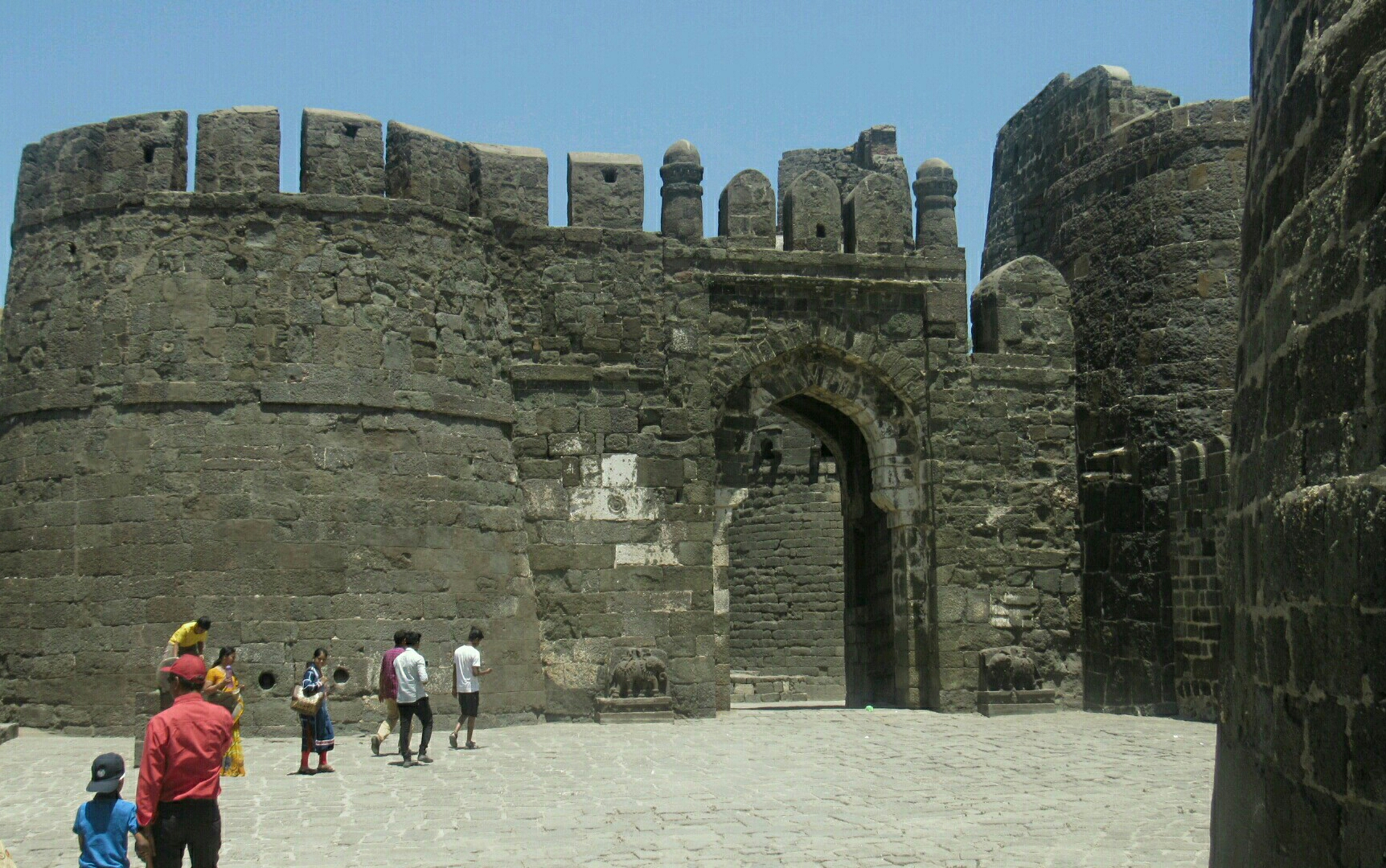
Front view of Daulatabad fort

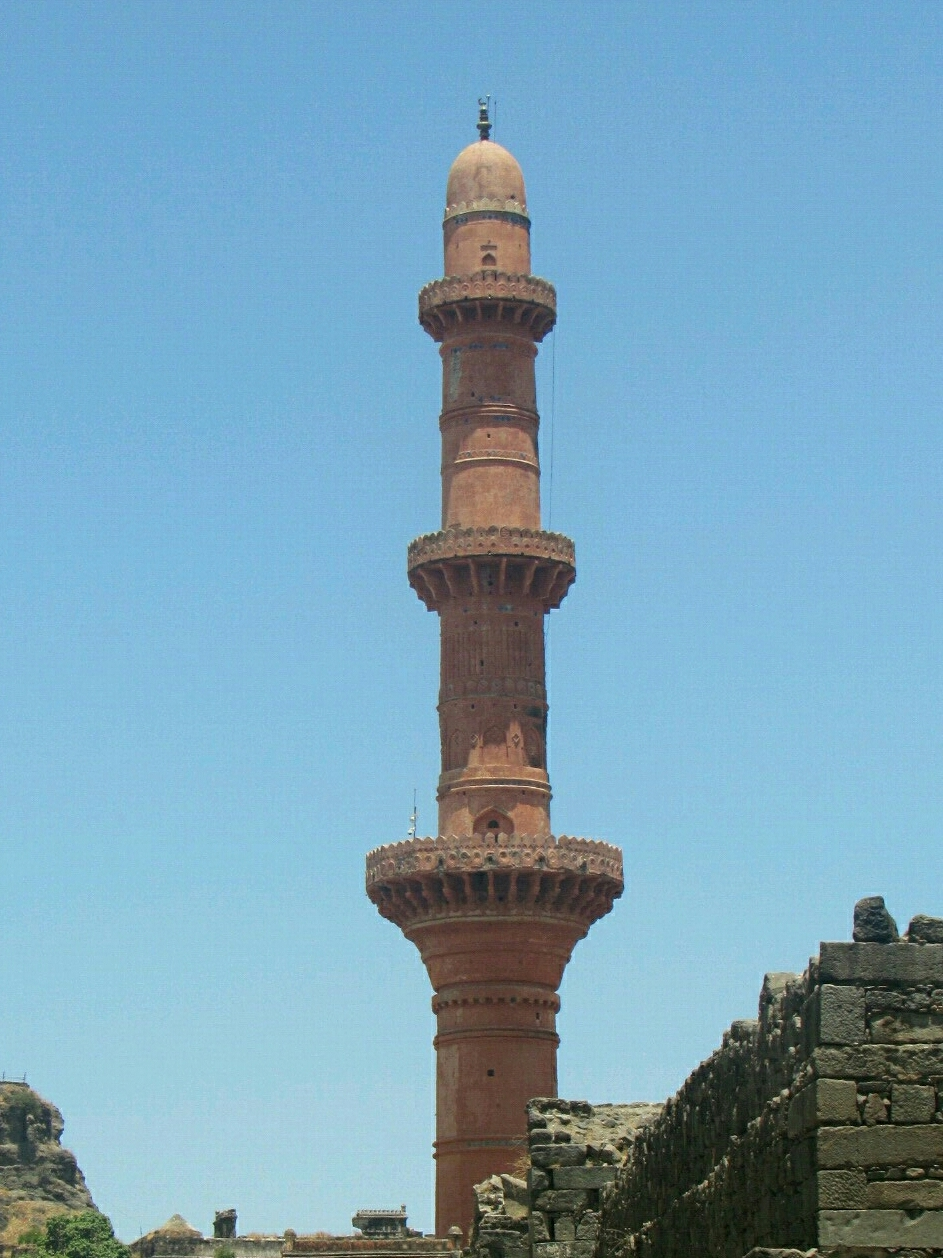
Chand Minar

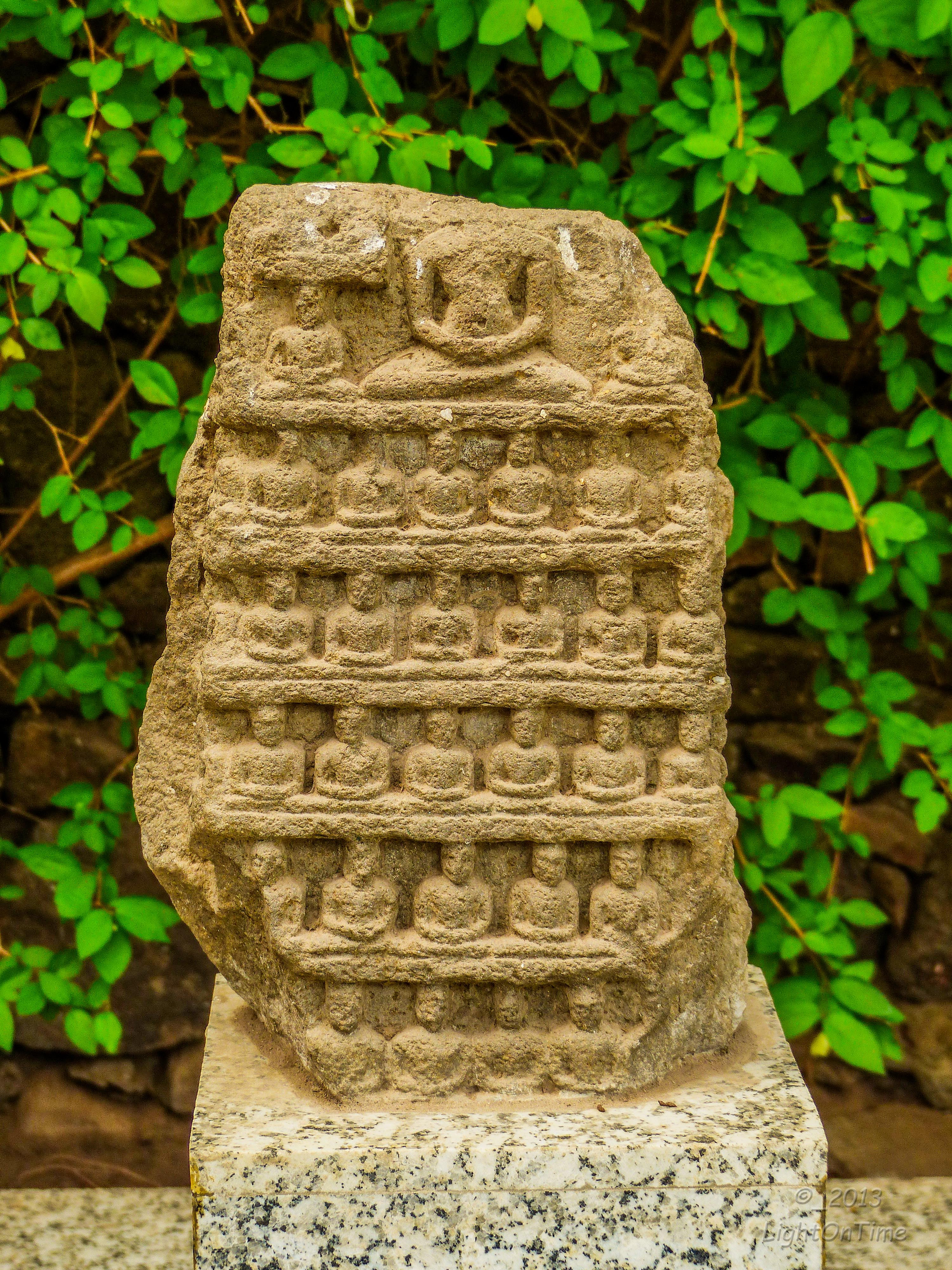
Jain relics

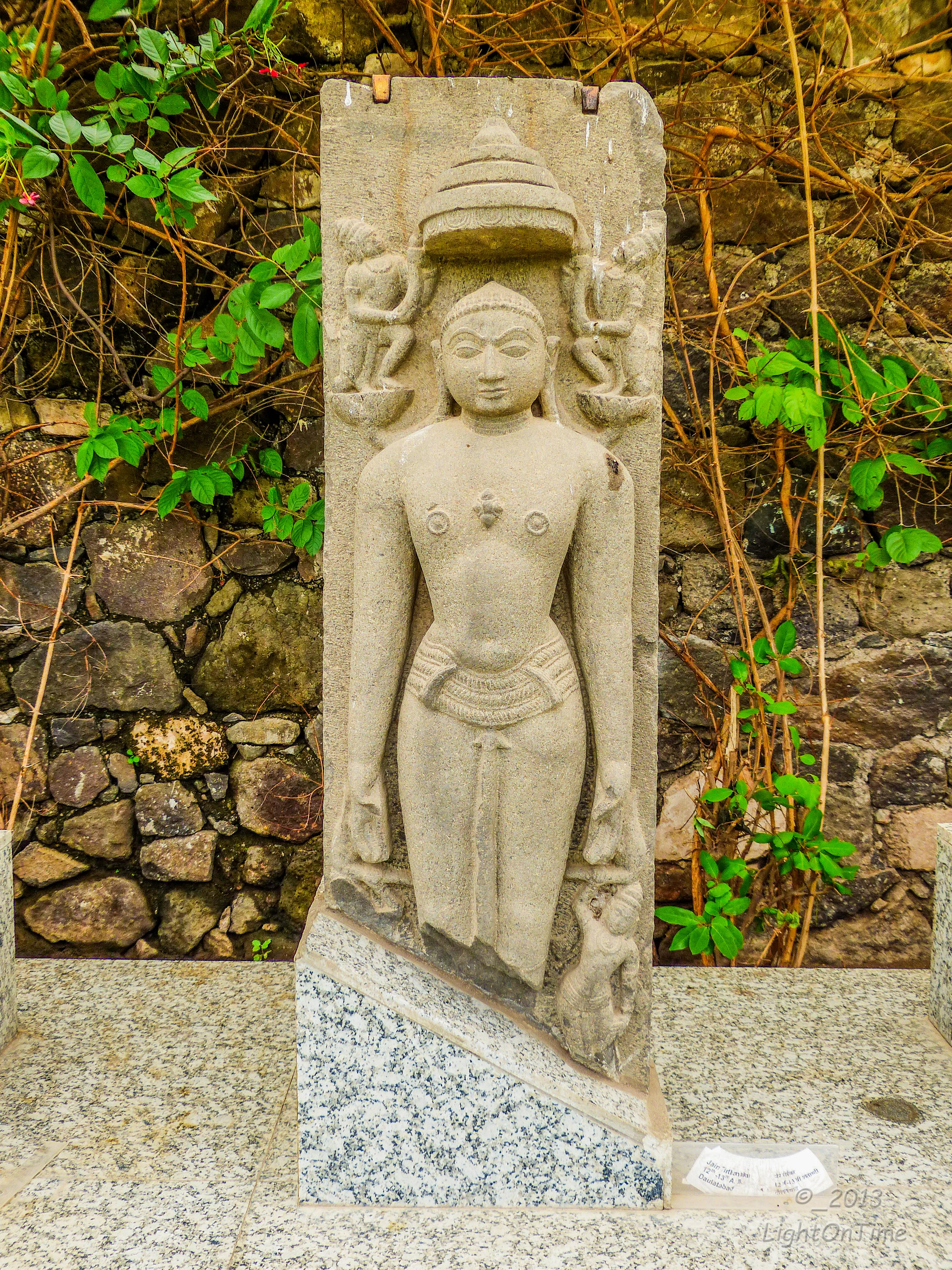
Jain Relics

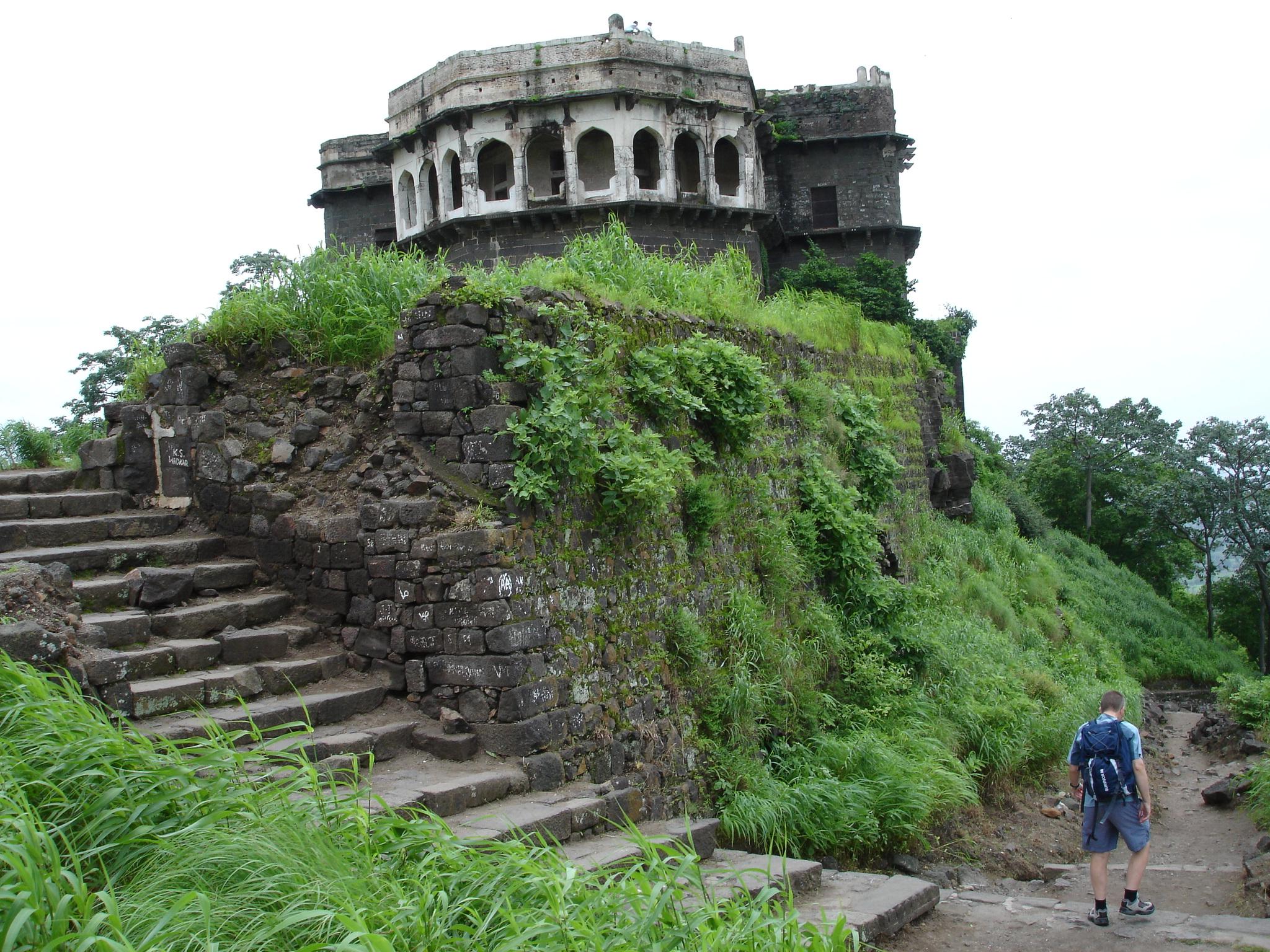
Daulatabad Fort

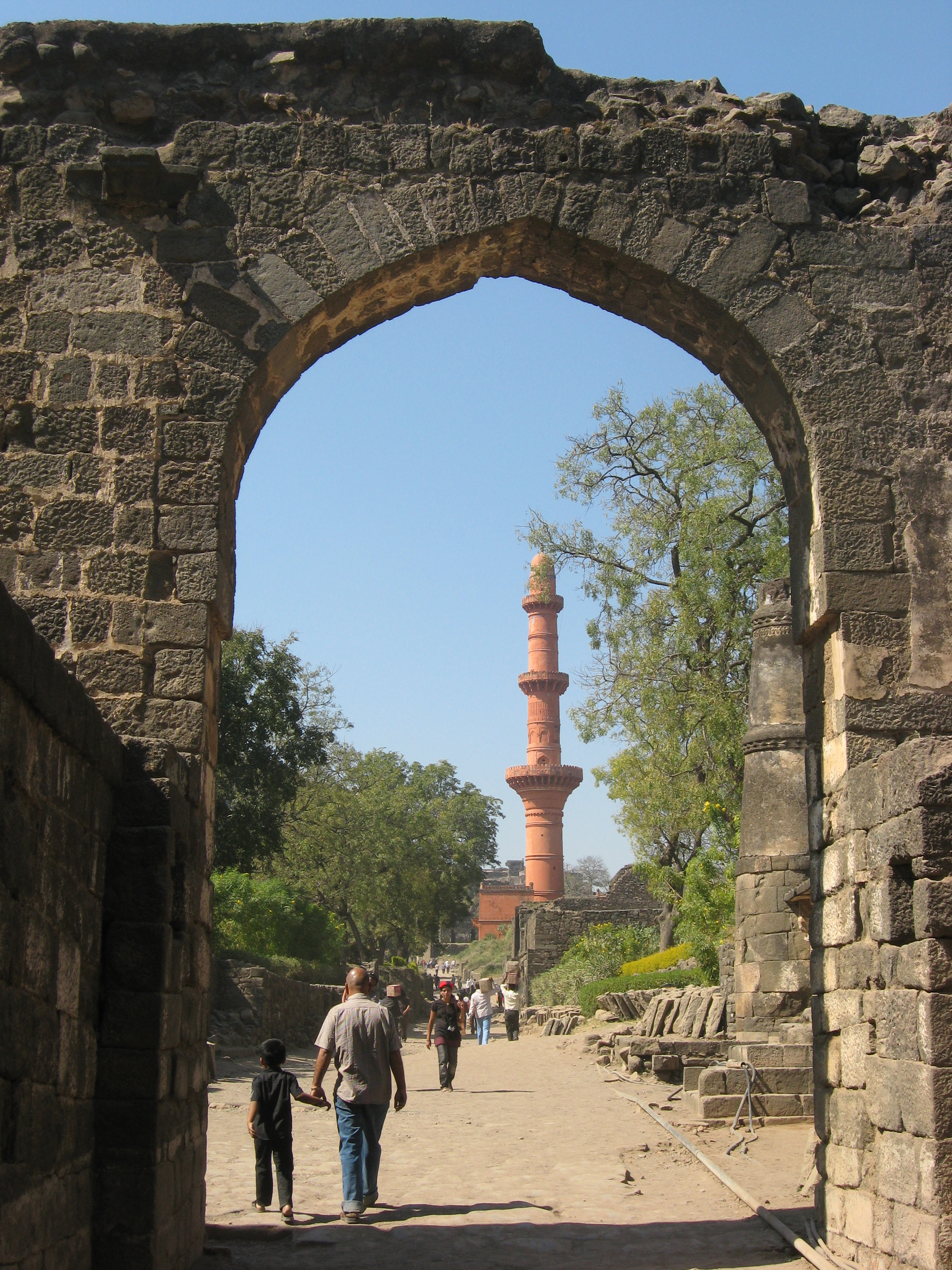
Daulatabad Fort

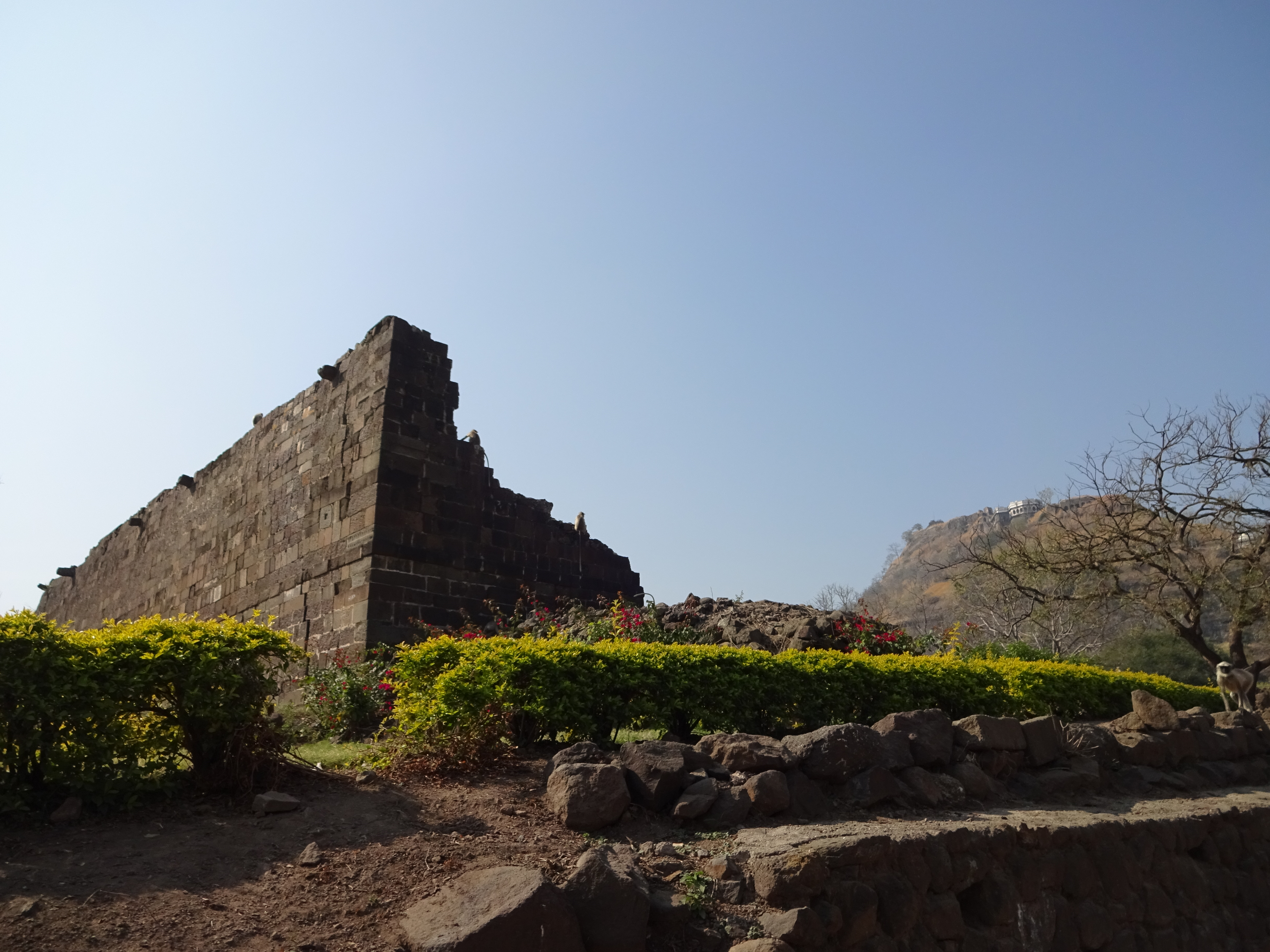
Daulatabad, Aurangabad

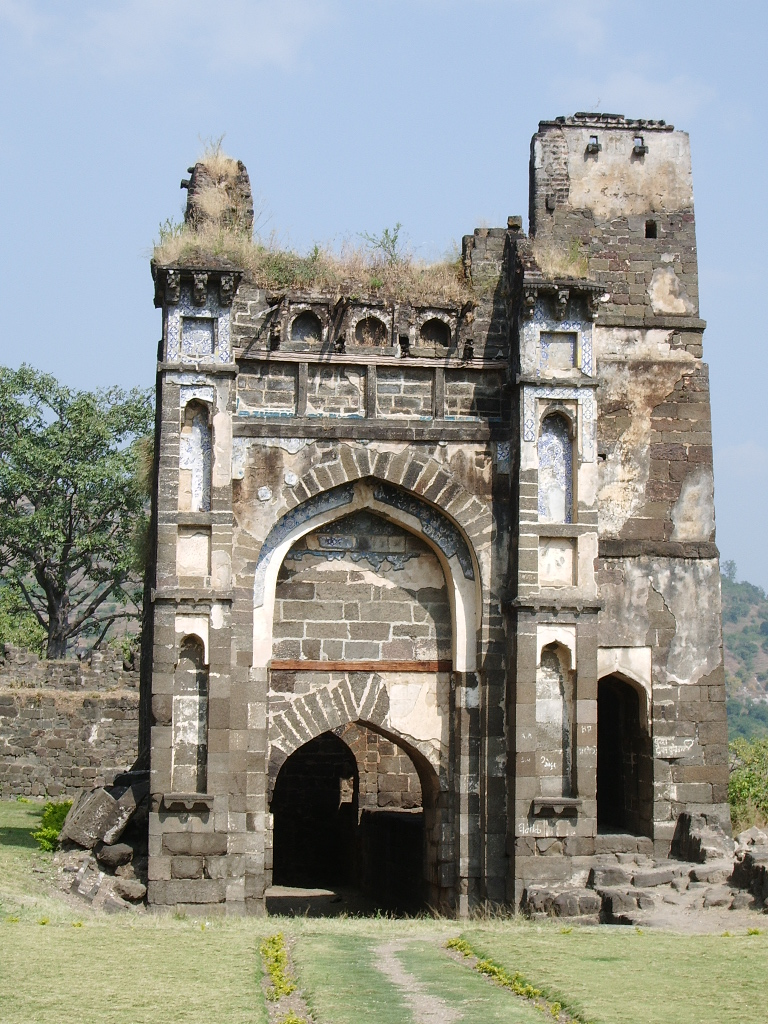
Daulatabad Prison

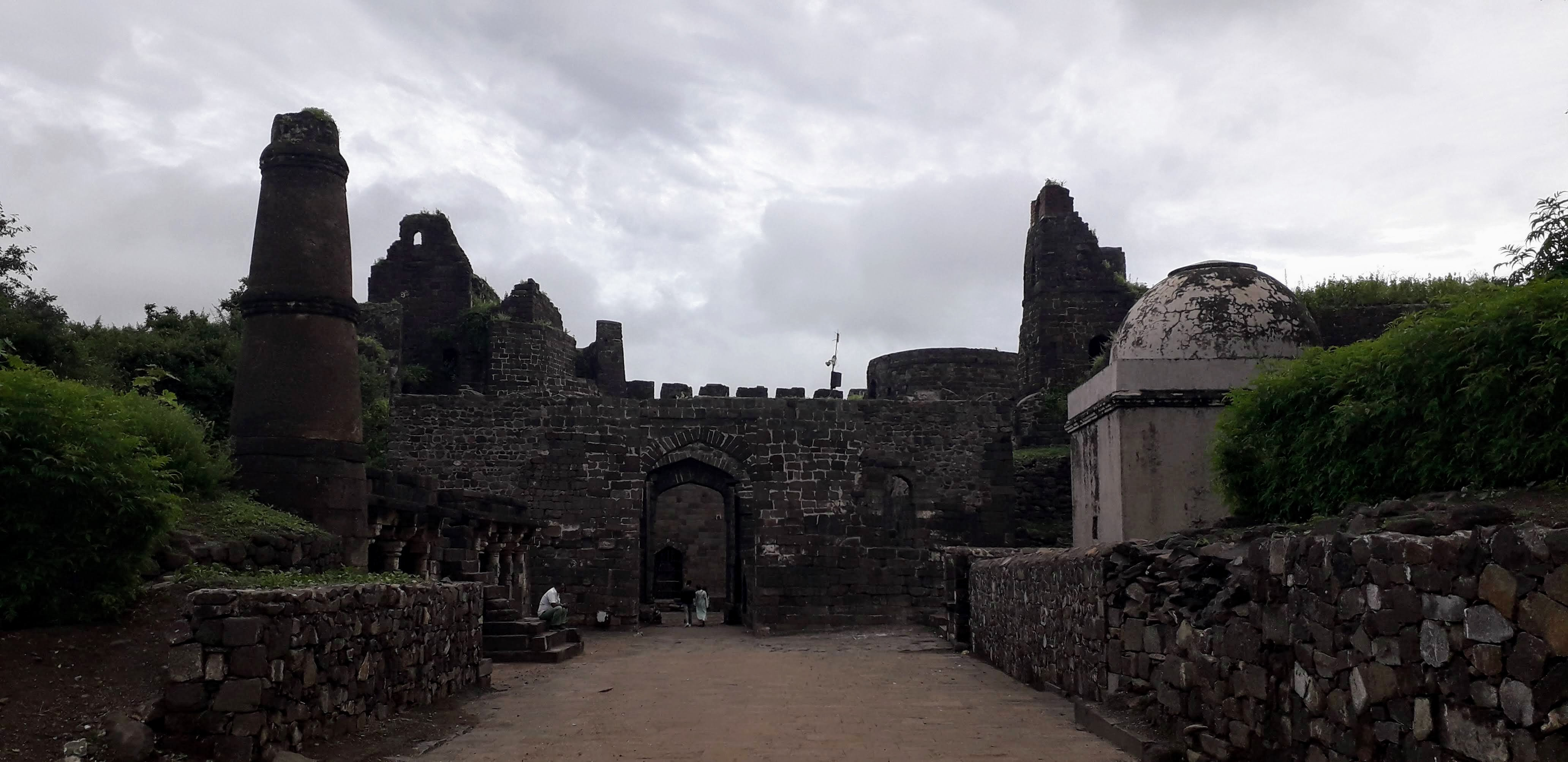
Gateway to Daulatabad Fort

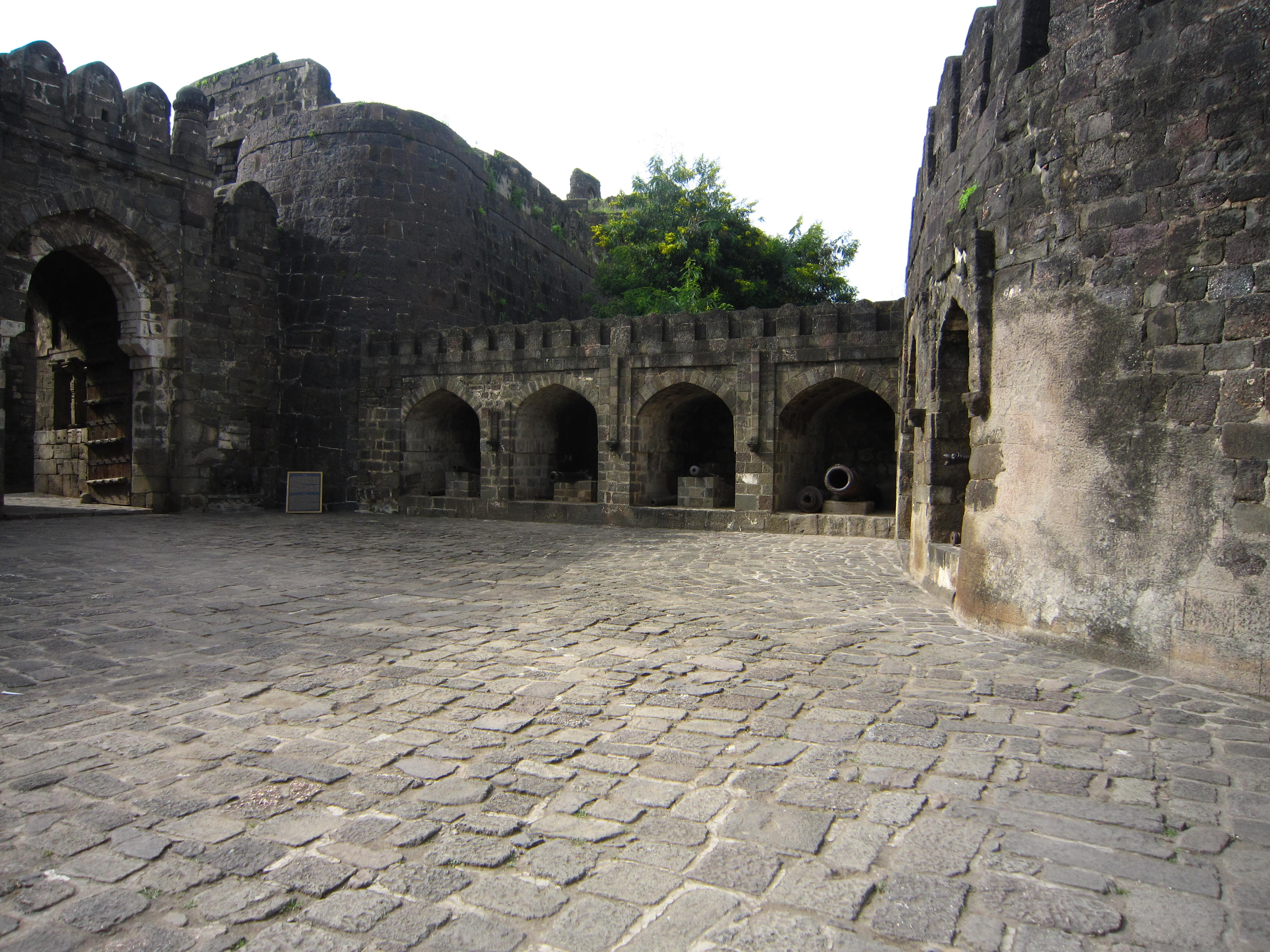
Daulatabad fort entrance

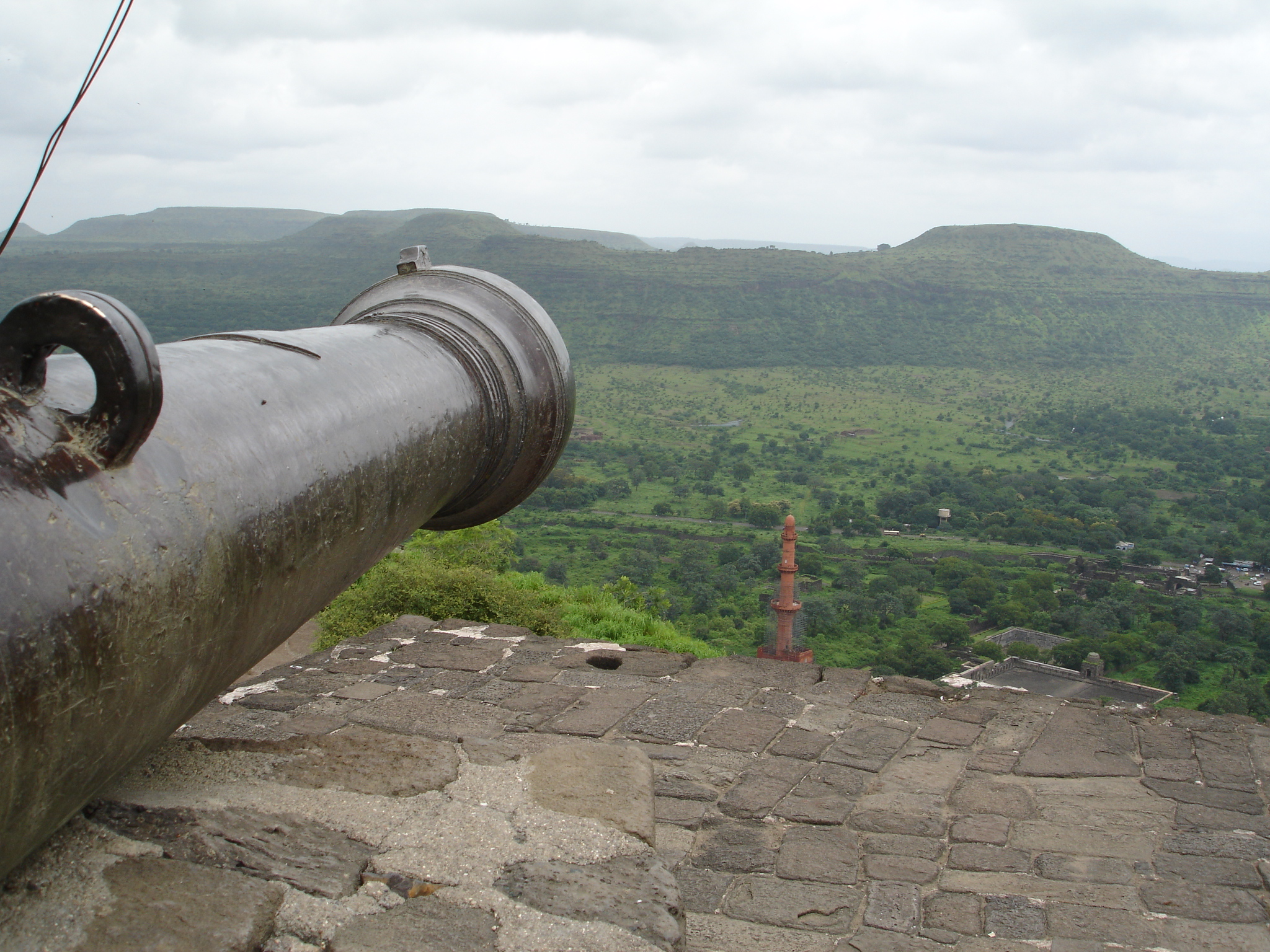
Aurangabad-Daulatabad Fort

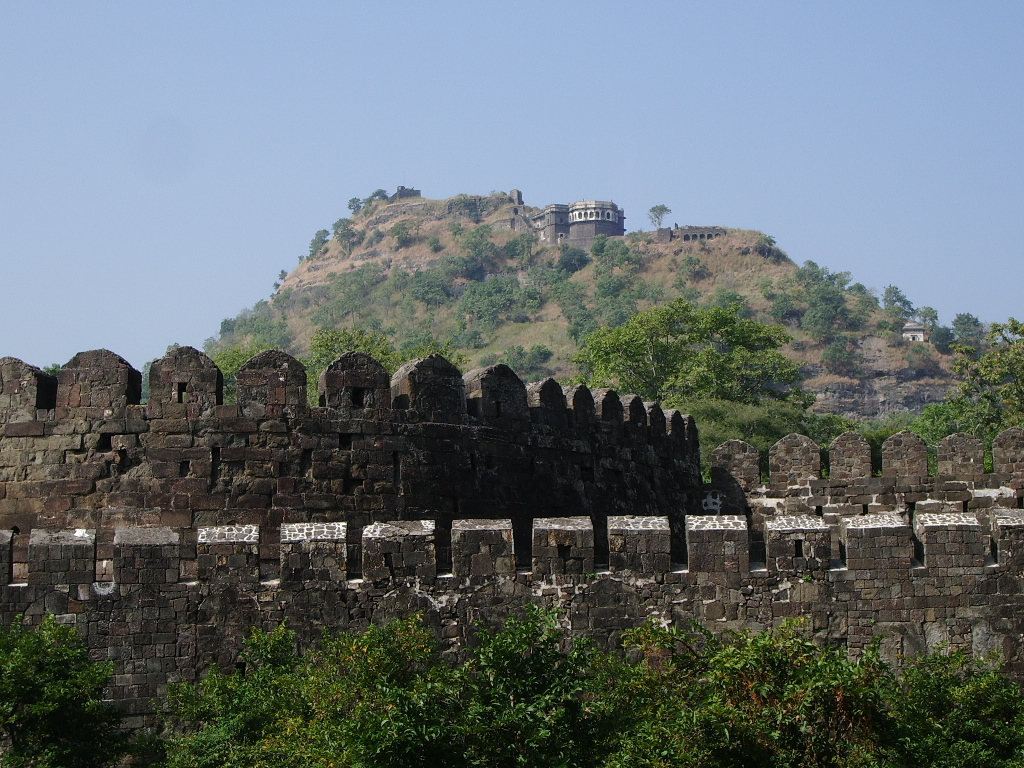
Dualatabad Fort

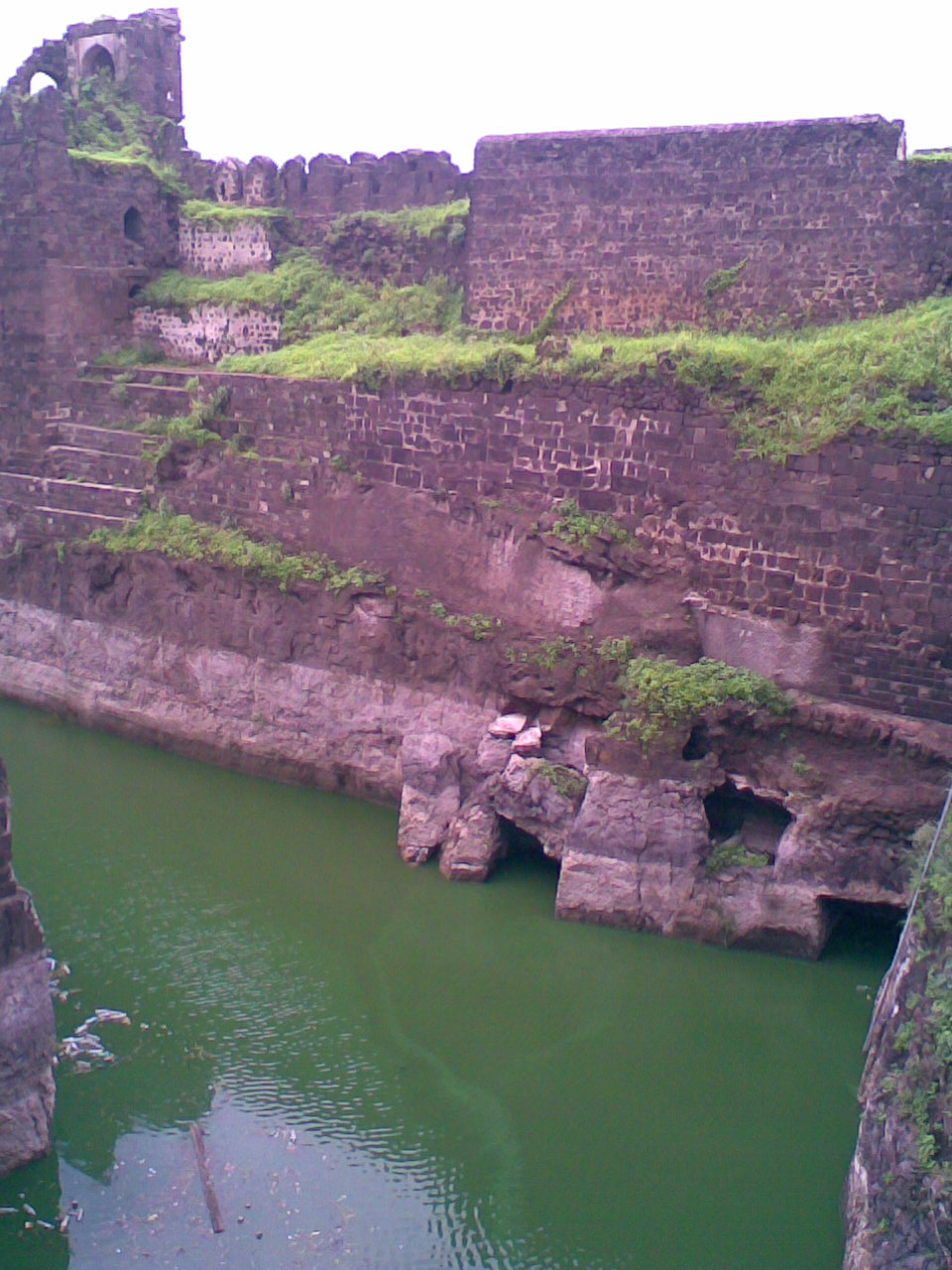
Daulatabad Fort

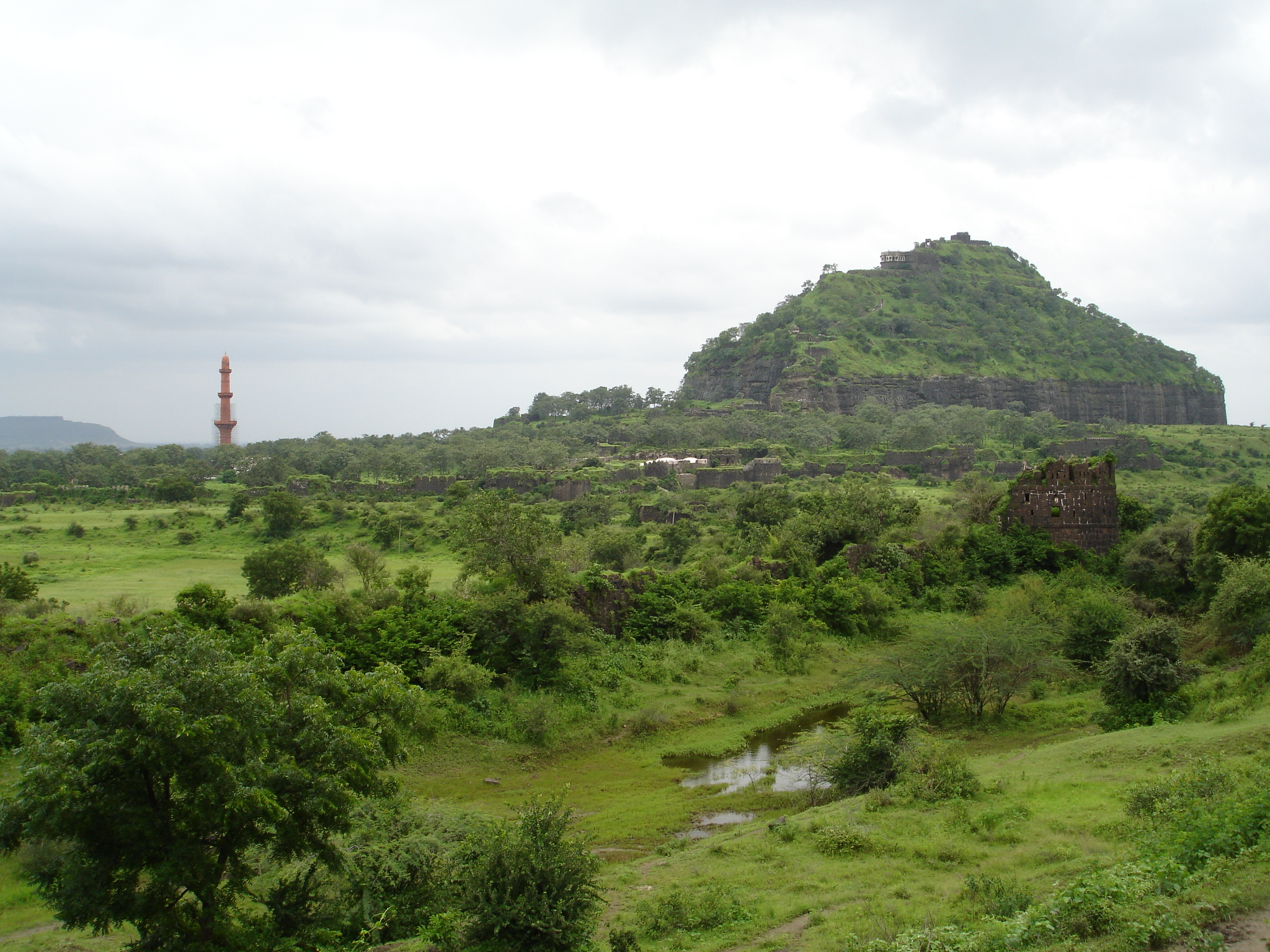
Aurangabad - Daulatabad Fort

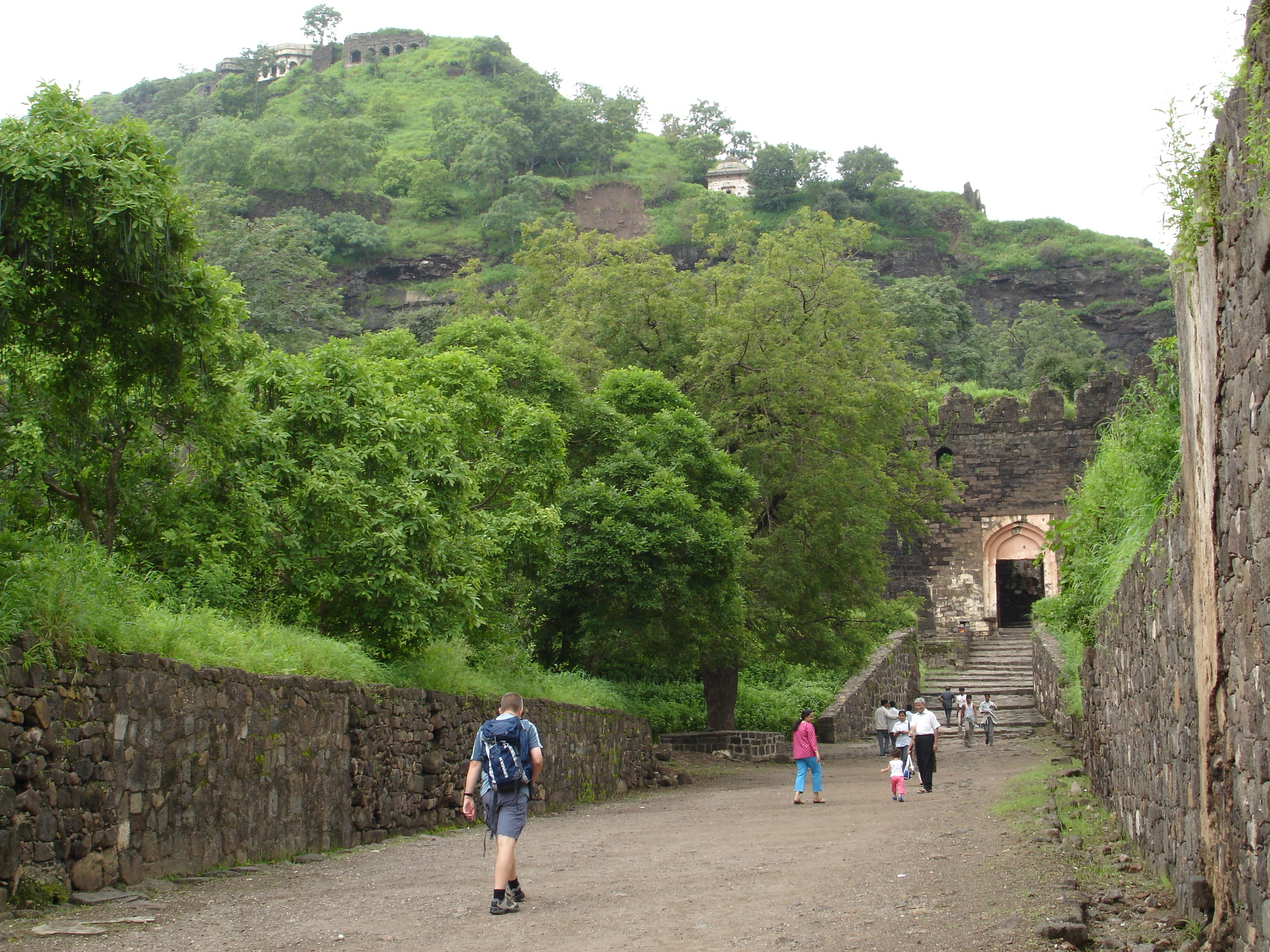
Aurangabad - Daulatabad Fort

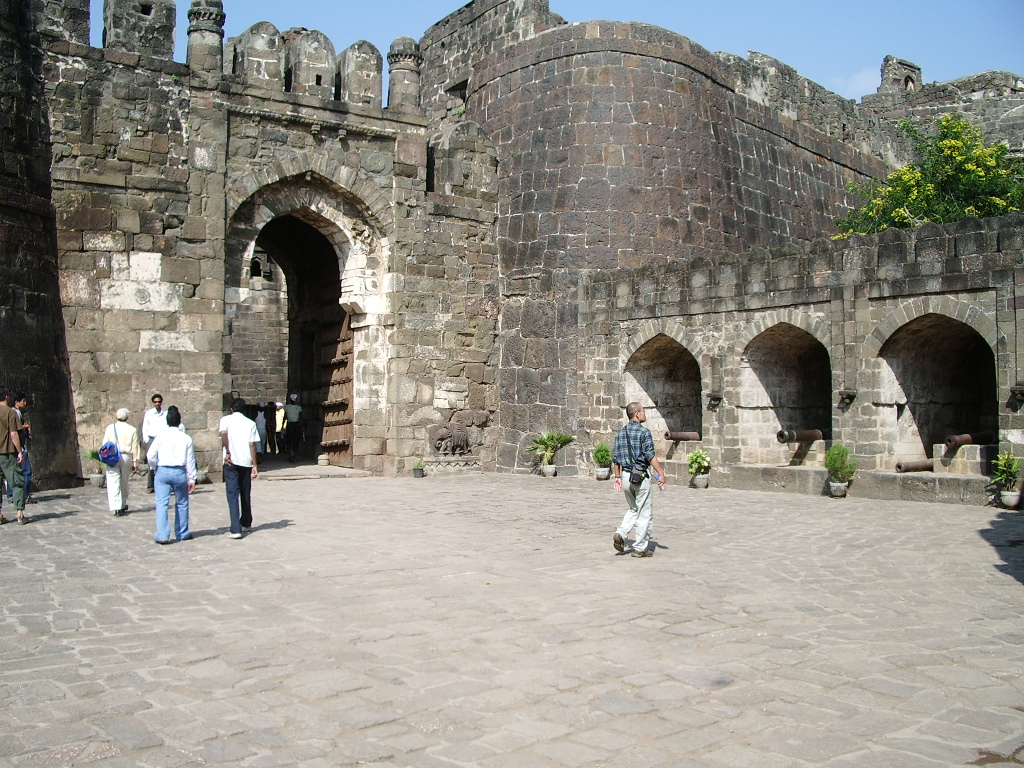
Daulatabad Fort Gate

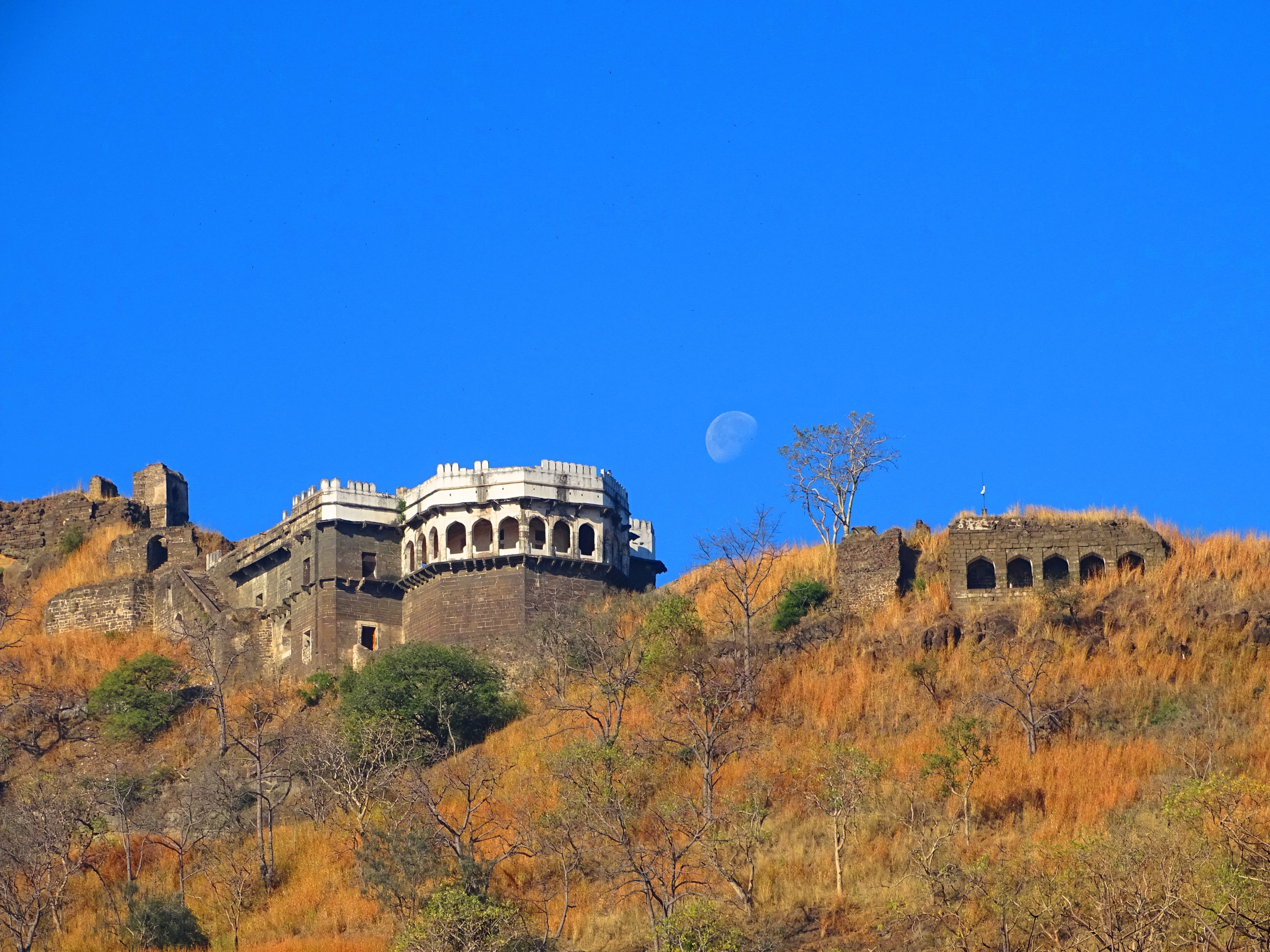
Daulatabad Fort -Aurangabad

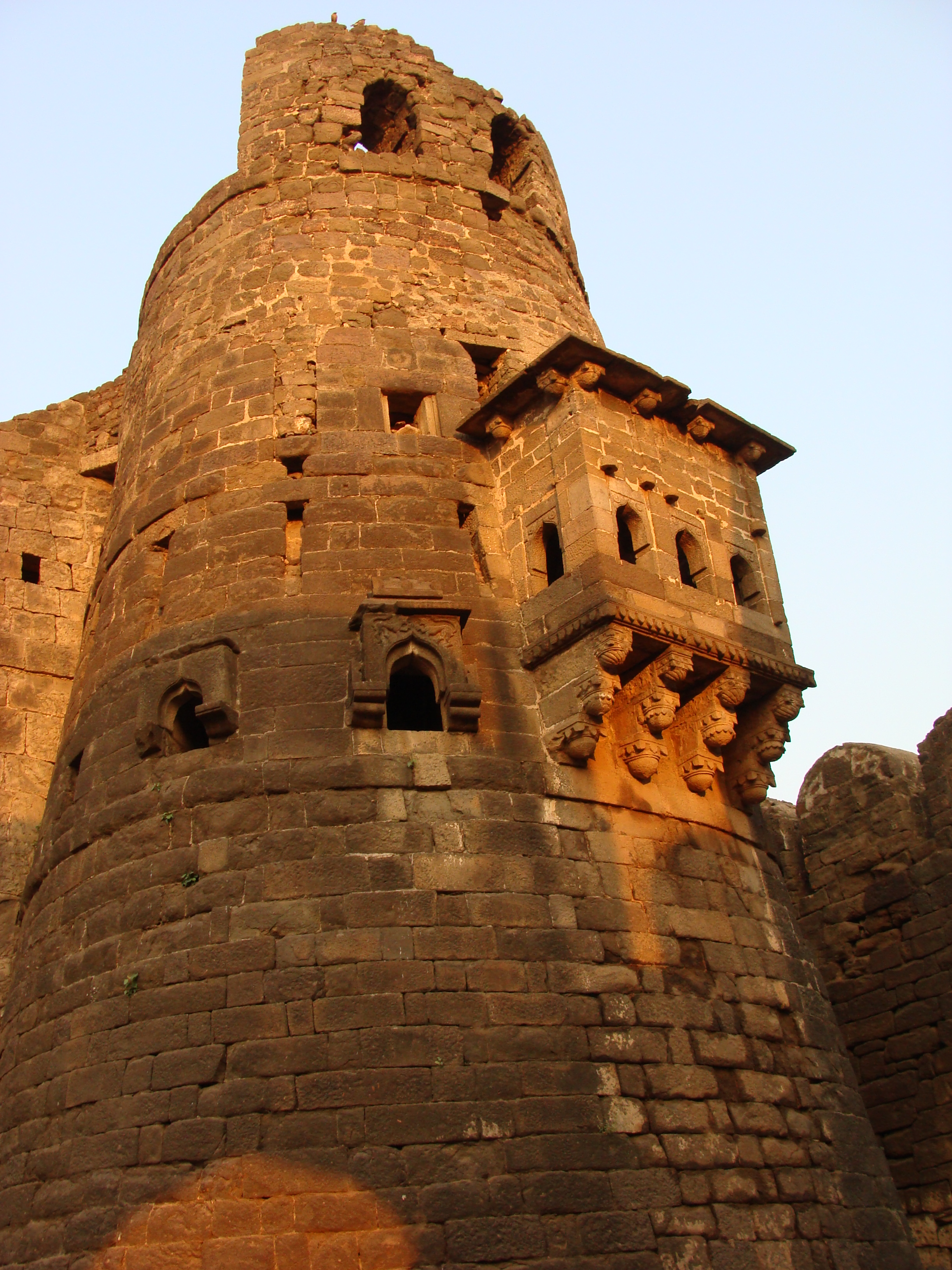
Daulatabad Fort

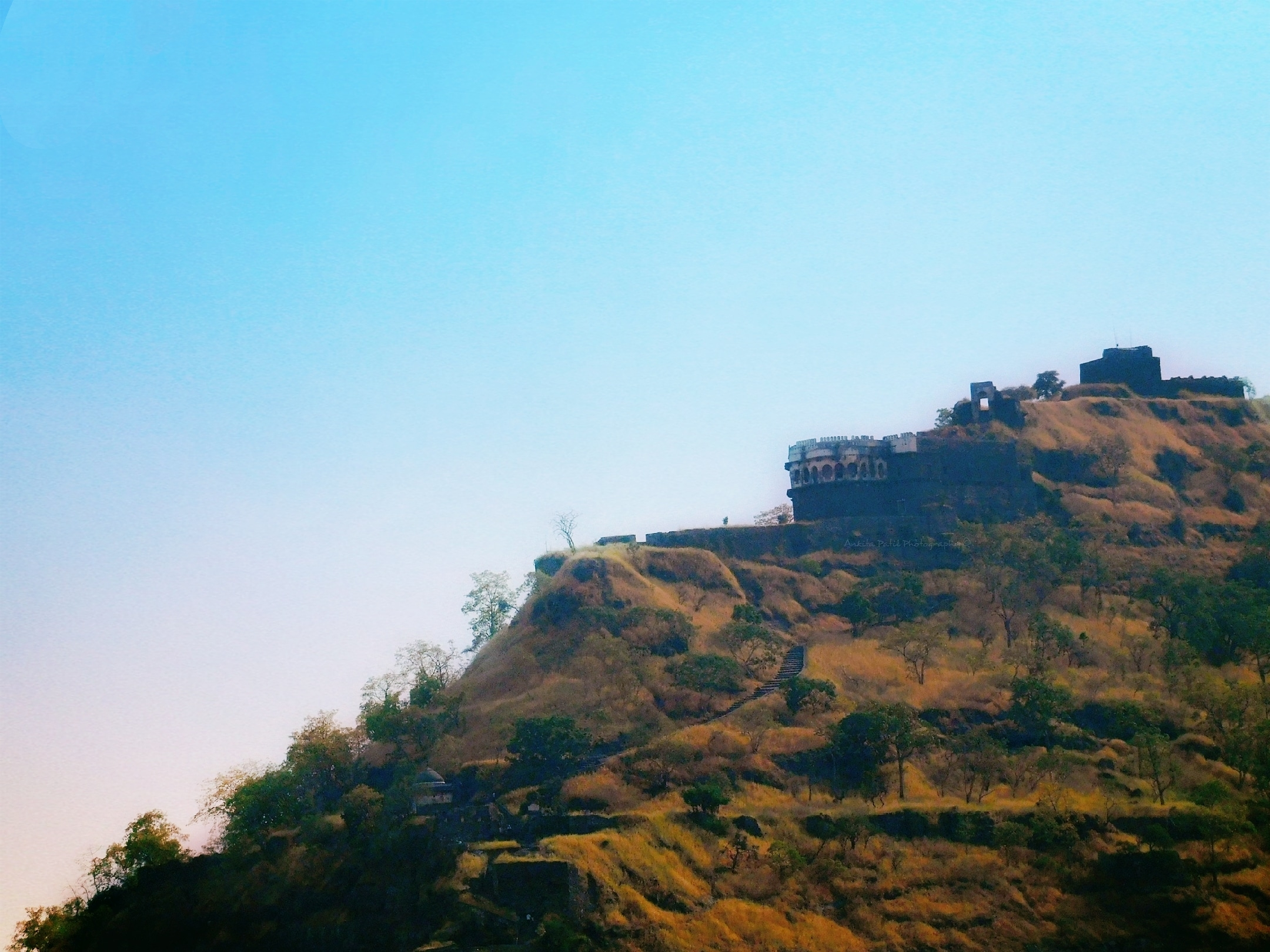
Daulatabad Fort, Aurangabad

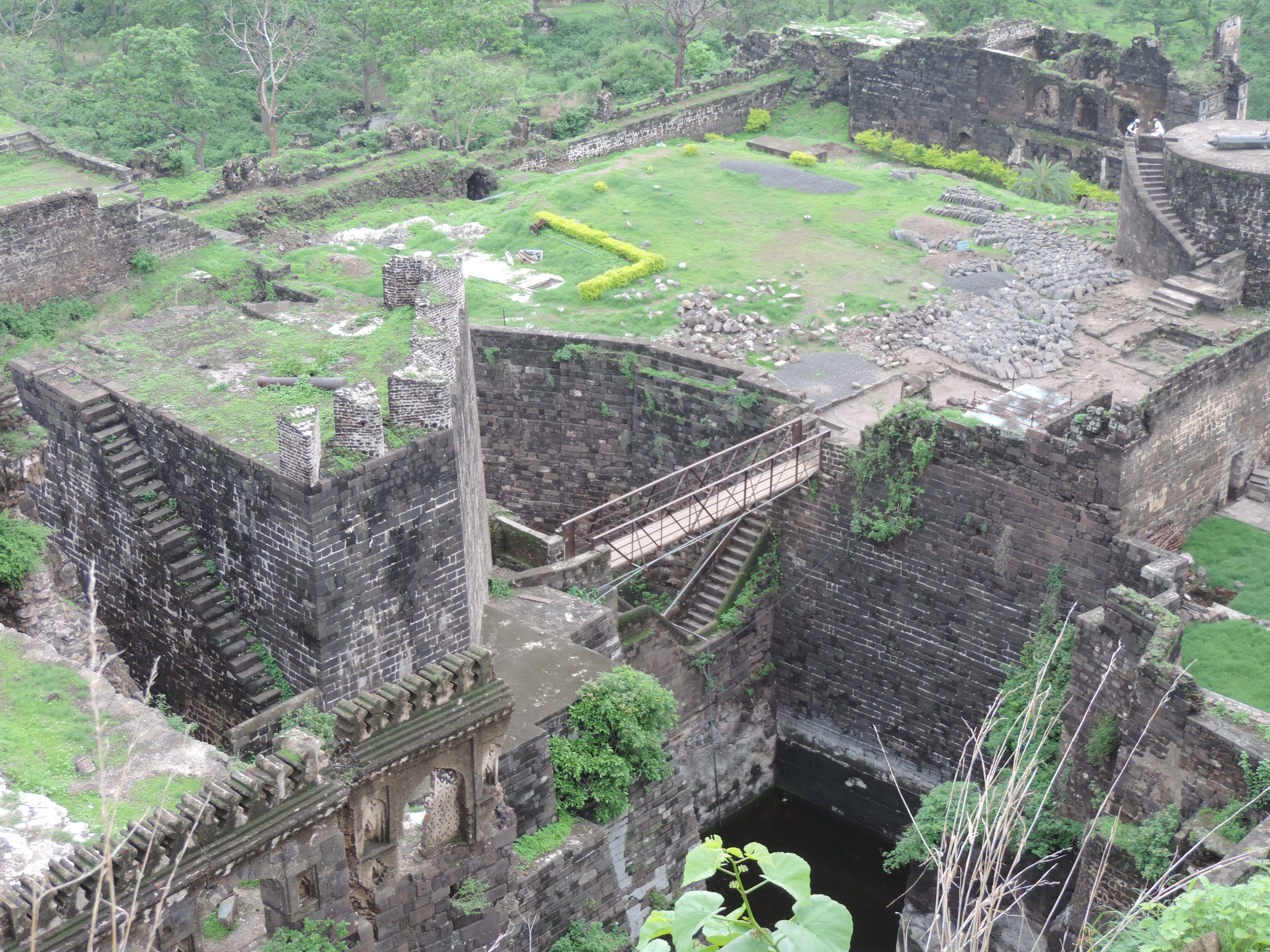
Daulatabad Fort

== See also ==
- Tourism in Marathwada
- Tourist attractions in Aurangabad, Maharashtra
