= History of South India =

The history of southern India covers a span of over four thousand years, during which the region saw the rise and fall of a number of dynasties and empires.

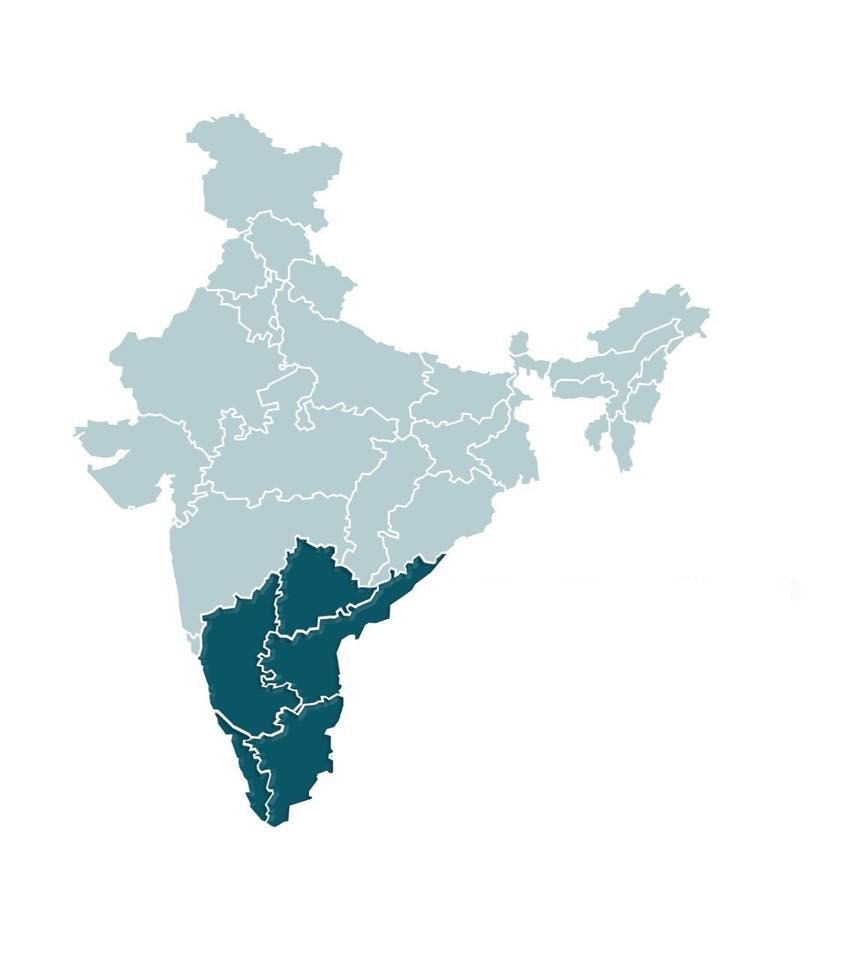
Location of South India

The period of known history of southern India begins with the Iron Age (c. 1200 BCE – 200 BCE), Sangam period (c. 600 BCE – 300 CE) and Medieval southern India until the 15th century CE. Dynasties of Chera, Chola, Pandyan, Pallava, Travancore, Cochin, Zamorin, Kolathunadu, Chalukya, Satavahana, Rashtrakuta, Western Ganga, Kakatiya, Hoysala, Seuna, Bhonsle, Gaekwad, Scindia, Holkar, Patwardhan, Sangama, Saluva, Tuluva, Aravidu and Bahmani were at their peak during various periods of history.

The Vijayanagara Empire rose in response to the Islamic intervention and covered most of southern India. It acted as a bulwark against the Deccan Sultanate and Mughal expansion into the south. When the European powers arrived during the 16th and 18th centuries CE, the southern kingdoms, most notably Tipu Sultan's Kingdom of Mysore, resisted the new threats, but many parts eventually succumbed to British conquest. The British created the Madras Presidency which acted as an administrative centre for the rest of southern India, with them being princely states. After Indian independence, southern India was linguistically divided into the states of Andhra Pradesh, Tamil Nadu, Karnataka, Telangana and Kerala.

== Prehistoric period to Iron Age ==
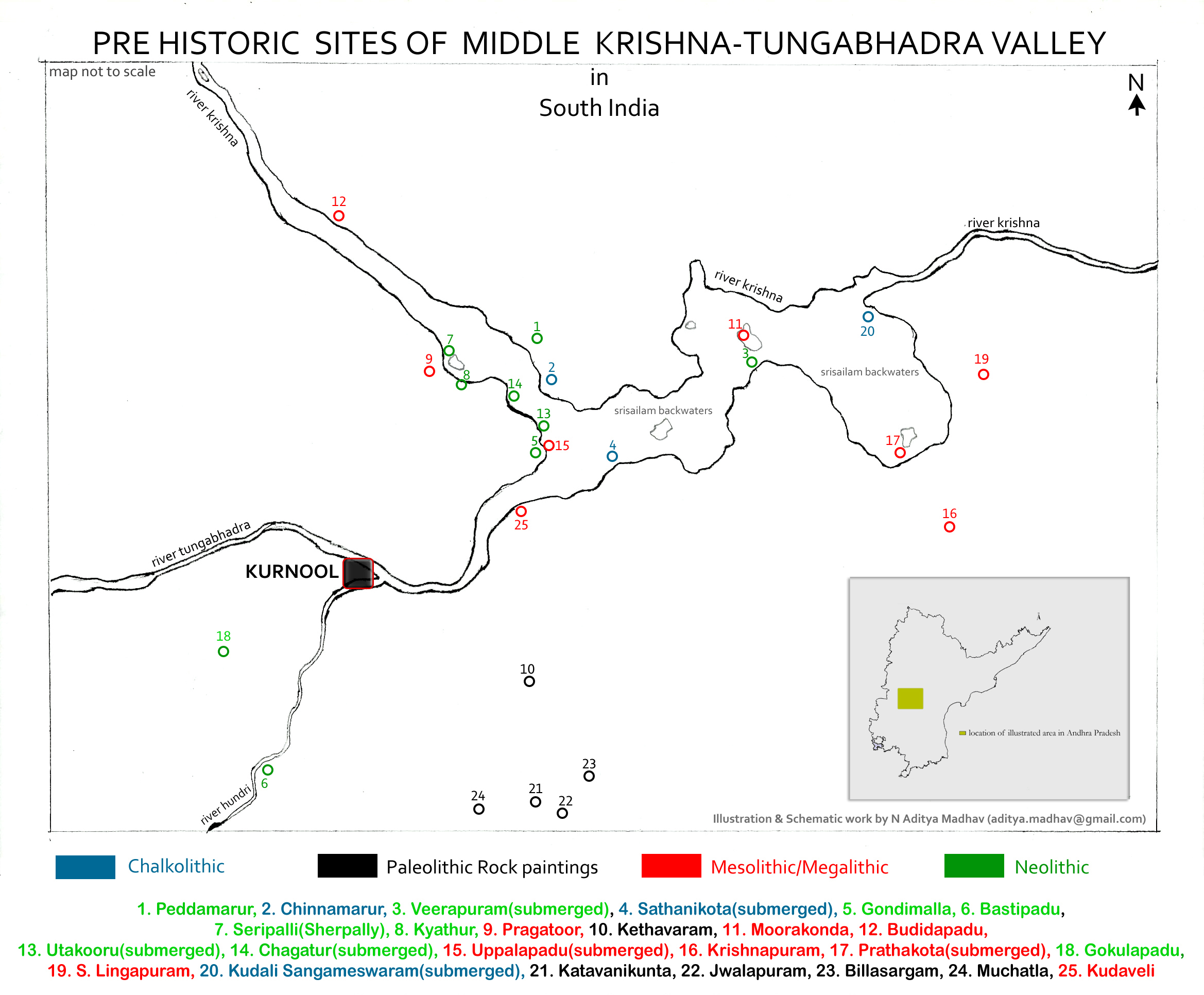
Pre-historic sites of Mid Krishna-Tungabhadra Valley in southern Indian state of Andhra Pradesh

South India remained in the Mesolithic until 2500 BCE. Microlith production is attested for the period 6000 to 3000 BCE. The Neolithic period lasted from 2500 BCE to 1000 BCE, followed by the Iron Age, characterized by megalithic burials. Comparative excavations carried out in Adichanallur in the Tirunelveli district and in northern India have provided evidence of a southward migration of the Megalithic culture. The Krishna Tungabhadra valley was also a place for Megalithic culture in South India.Archaeologists have discovered iron objects at six sites in Tamil Nadu, dating back to 2,953–3,345 BCE, or between 5,000 and 5,400 years old, which suggest that an Iron Age might have begun in Tamil Nadu.

=== Beginning of Iron Age ===
The earliest Iron Age sites in southern India date from c. 1200 to 200 BCE, and some of the sites are contemporary with the Sangam period.

Hallur in Karnataka and Adichanallur in Tamil Nadu are notable Iron Age sites of ancient southern India.

== Ancient period ==
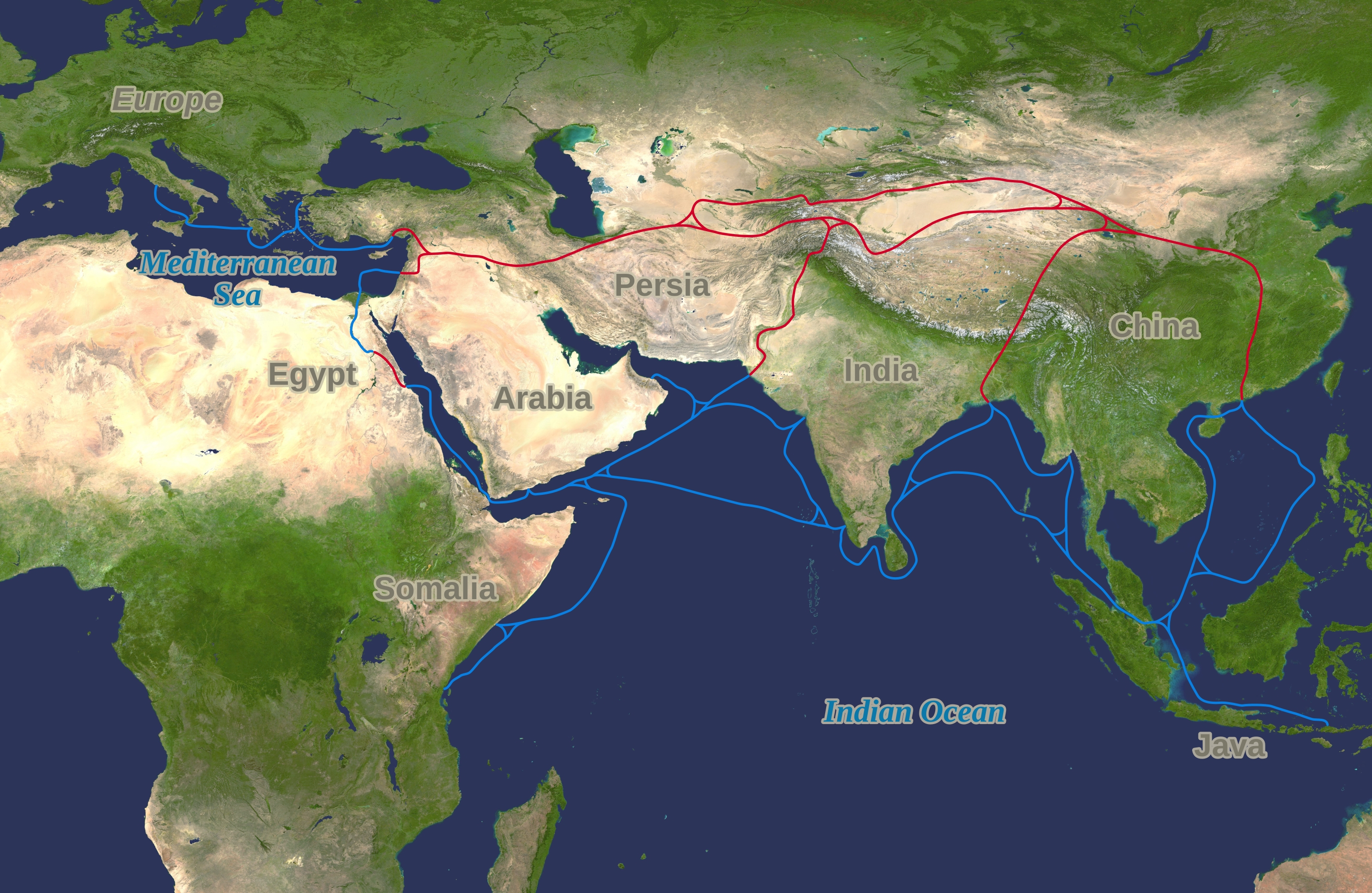
Ancient Silk Road map. The Spice trade was mainly along the water routes (blue).

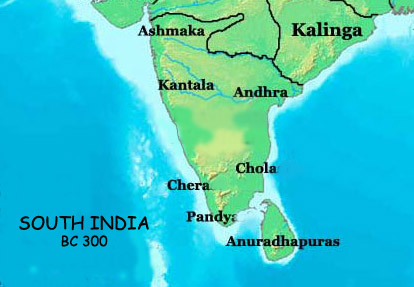
South India in 300 BCE, showing the Chera, Pandya, and Chola tribes.

Evidence in the form of documents and inscriptions do not appear often in the history of ancient southern India. Although there are signs that the history dates back to several centuries BCE, we only have an authentic archaeological evidence from the early centuries of the common era. Until about 600 BC, literature composed to the north of the Vindhyas do not display any cognizance of the region to the south. During the reign of Ashoka (c. 268–232 BCE) the three Tamil dynasties of Chola, Chera and Pandya were ruling the south.

=== Pandyan dynasty ===
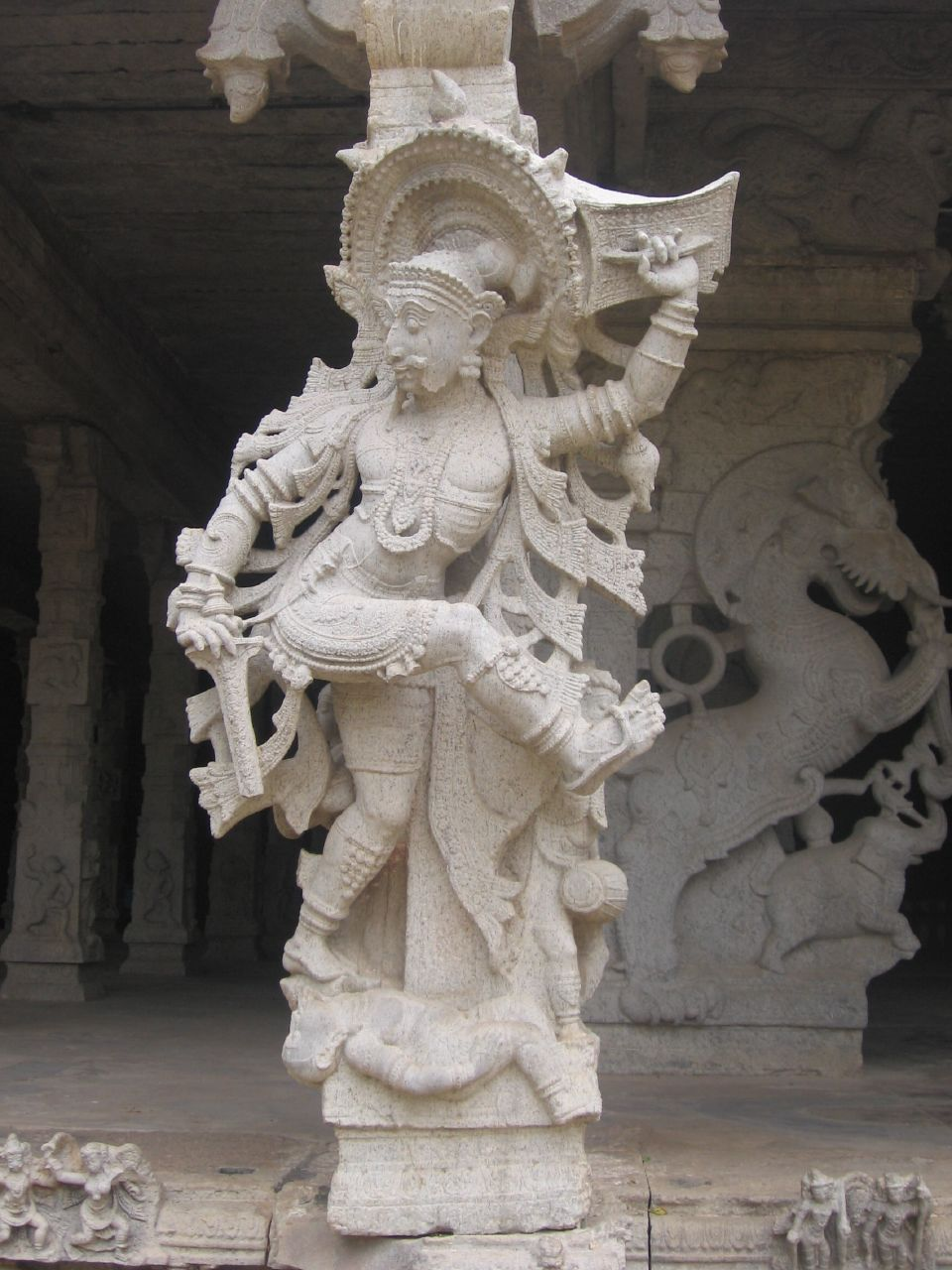
Stone sculpture, Srivaikuntanathan Permual temple, Srivaikuntam, Tuticorin, Tamil Nadu

The Pandyas were one of the three ancient Tamil dynasties (the Chola and Chera being the other two), who ruled the Tamil country from prehistoric times, until the end of the 15th century. They ruled initially from Korkai, a seaport on the southernmost tip of the Indian peninsula, and in later times moved to Madurai. Pandyas are mentioned in Sangam literature (c. 400 BCE – 300 CE) as well as by Greek and Roman sources during this period.

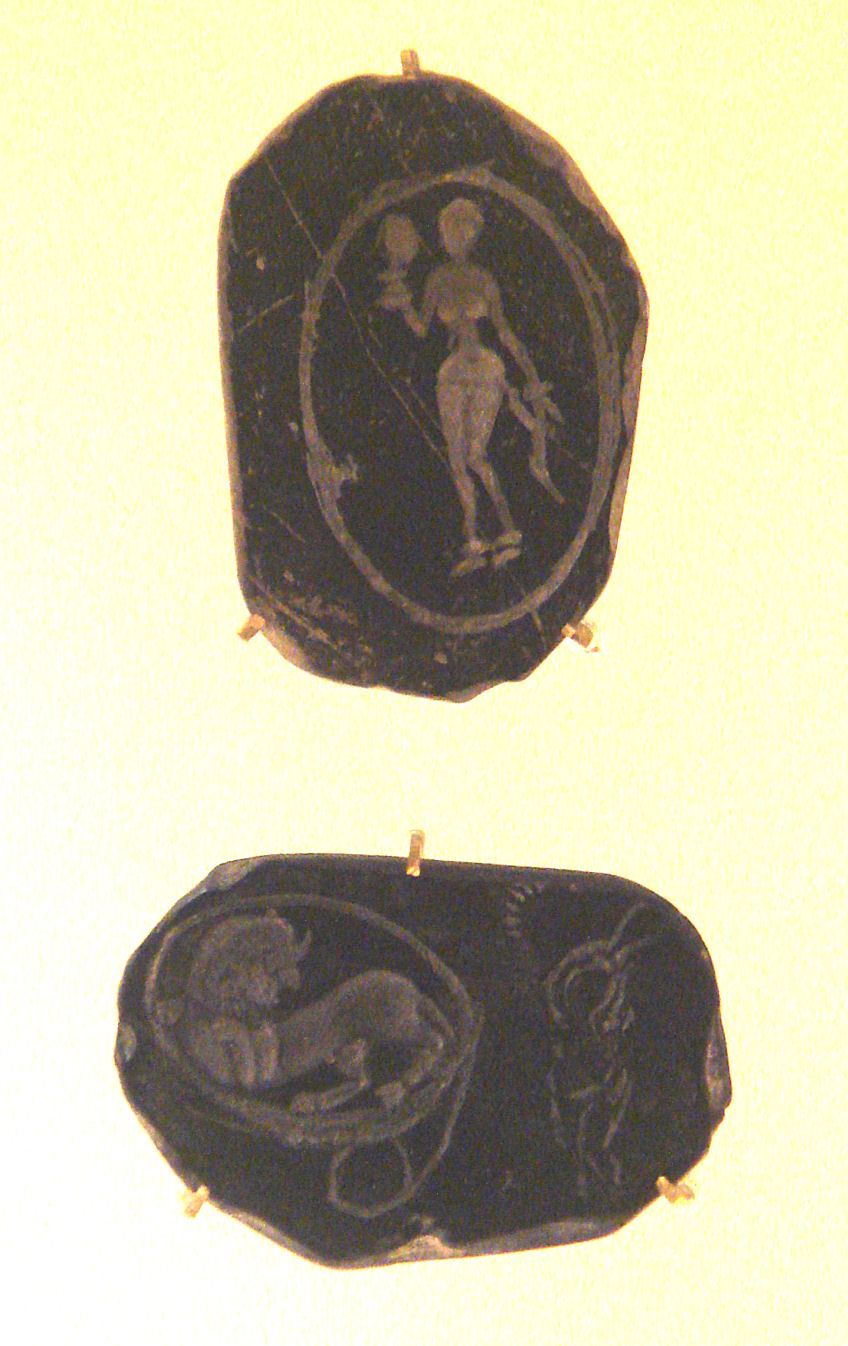
Grey pottery with engravings, Arikamedu

The early Pandya dynasty described in Sangam literature went into obscurity during the invasion of the Kalabhras. The dynasty revived under Kadungon in the early 6th century CE, pushed the Kalabhras out of the Tamil country and ruled from Madurai. They again went into decline with the rise of the Cholas in the 9th century CE, and were in constant conflict with them. The Pandyas allied themselves with the Sinhalese and the Cheras in harassing the Chola empire until they found an opportunity for reviving their fortunes during the late 13th century. Jatavarman Sundara Pandyan (c. 1251 CE) expanded their empire into the Telugu country and invaded Sri Lanka, conquering the northern half of the island. They also had extensive trade links with the Southeast Asian maritime empires of Srivijaya and their successors. During their history, the Pandyas were repeatedly in conflict with the Pallavas, Cholas, Hoysalas and finally the Muslim invaders from the Delhi Sultanate. The Pandyan Kingdom finally became extinct after the establishment of the Madurai Sultanate in the 14th century CE. The Pandyas excelled in both trade and literature. They controlled the pearl fisheries along the south Indian coast, between Sri Lanka and India, which produced the finest pearls known in the ancient world.

=== Chola Empire ===
The Chola Empire at its greatest extent, during the reign of Rajendra Chola I in 1030 CE

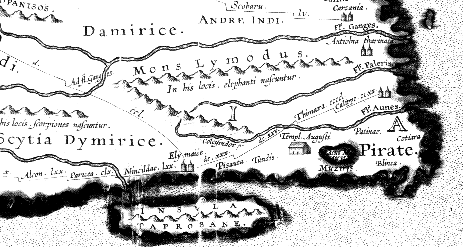
Section of Tabula Peutingeriana, the Roman map from 300 CE, depicting South Indian peninsula and Sri Lanka (Insula Taprobane)

Names, routes and locations of the Periplus of the Erythraean Sea (1st century CE)

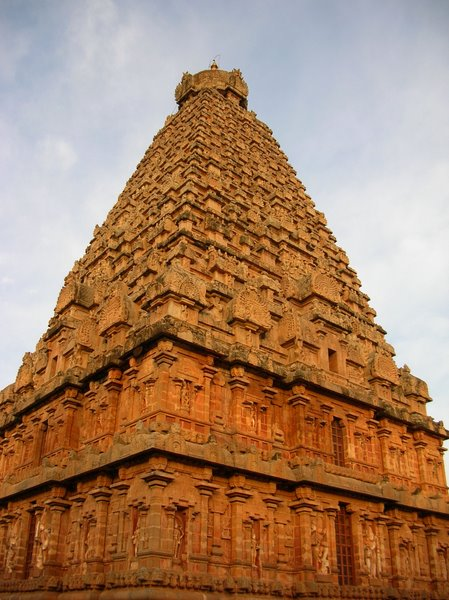
The Brihadisvara temple at Thanjavur, Tamil Nadu is one of the largest monolithic temple complexes in the world – a UNESCO World Heritage Site.

The Cholas were one of the three main dynasties to rule southern India from ancient times. Karikala Chola (late 1st century CE) was the most famous king during the early years of the dynasty and managed to gain ascendency over the Pandyas and Cheras. The Chola dynasty, however, went into a period of decline from the 4th century CE. This period coincided with the ascendency of the Kalabhras, who moved down from the northern Tamil country, displacing the established kingdoms, and ruled over most of southern India for almost 300 years.

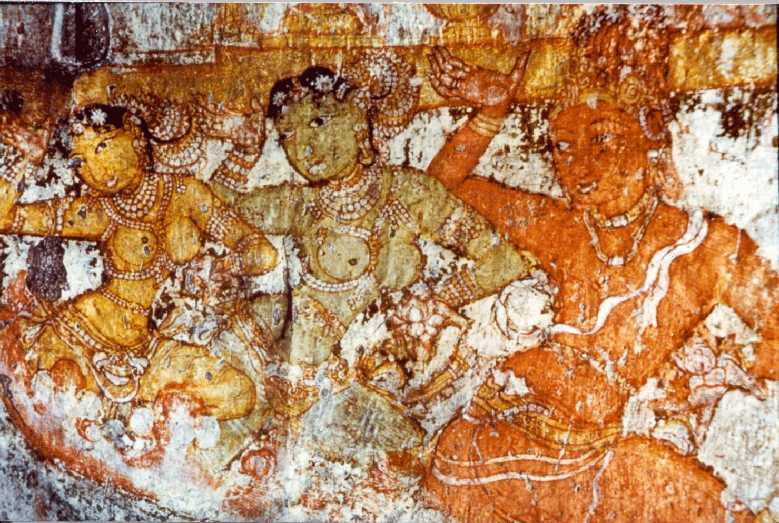
Chola Fresco of Dancing girls. Peruvudaiyaar Temple c. 1100 C.E., Thanjavur, Tamil Nadu.

Vijayalaya Chola revived the Chola dynasty in 850 CE by conquering Thanjavur, defeating Ilango Mutharaiyar, and making it his capital. His son Aditya defeated the Pallava king Aparajita and extended the Chola territories to Tondaimandalam. The centres of the Chola realm were at Kanchi (Kanchipuram) and Thanjavur. One of the most powerful Chola monarchs was Raja Raja Chola, who reigned from 985 to 1014 CE. His army defeated the navy of the Cheras at Thiruvananthapuram, and annexed Anuradhapura and the northern province of Ceylon. Rajendra Chola I completed the conquest of Sri Lanka, invaded Bengal, and undertook a great naval campaign that occupied parts of Malaya, Burma, and Sumatra. The Chola dynasty began declining by the 13th century and ended in 1279 CE. The Cholas were great builders and have left some of the most beautiful examples of early Tamil temple architecture. Brihadisvara Temple in Thanjavur is a fine example and has been listed as one of the UNESCO World Heritage Sites.

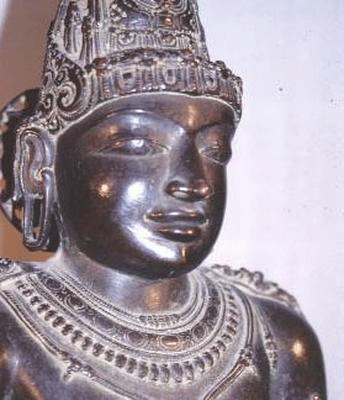
Detail of the statue of Rajaraja Chola at Brihadisvara Temple at Thanjavur, Tamil Nadu.

=== Chera dynasty ===
The Chera kingdom was one of the Tamil dynasties who ruled southern India from ancient times until around the 12th century CE. The Early Cheras ruled over the Malabar Coast, Coimbatore, Erode, Namakkal, Karur and Salem Districts in South India, which now form part of the modern day Indian states of Kerala and Tamil Nadu. Throughout the reign of the Early Cheras, trade continued to bring prosperity to their territories, with spices, ivory, timber, pearls and gems being exported to the Middle East and to southern Europe. Evidence of extensive foreign trade from ancient times can be seen throughout the Malabar coast (Muziris), Karur and Coimbatore districts.

==== Trade relations ====
The region of Kerala (Cheras) was possibly engaged in trading activities from the 3rd millennium BCE with Arabs, Sumerians and Babylonians. Phoenicians, Greeks, Egyptians, Romans, and Chinese were attracted by a variety of commodities, especially spices and cotton fabrics. Arabs and Phoenicians were the first to enter Malabar Coast to trade Spices. The Arabs on the coasts of Yemen, Oman, and the Persian Gulf, must have made the first long voyage to Kerala and other eastern countries. They must have brought the Cinnamon of Kerala to the Middle East. The Greek historian Herodotus (5th century BCE) records that in his time the cinnamon spice industry was monopolized by the Egyptians and the Phoenicians.

Muziris, Tyndis, Naura, Berkarai, and Nelcynda were among the principal trading port centres of the Chera kingdom. Megasthanes, the Greek ambassador to the court of Magadhan king Chandragupta Maurya (4th century BCE) mentions Muziris and a Pandyan trade centre. Pliny mentions Muziris as India's first port of importance. According to him, Muziris could be reached in 40 days from the Red Sea ports of Egypt purely depending on the south west monsoon winds. Later, the unknown author of the Periplus of the Erythraean Sea notes that "both Muziris and Nelcynda are now busy places". There were harbours of Naura near Kannur, Tyndis near Kozhikode, and Barace near Alappuzha, which were also trading with Rome and Palakkad pass (churam) facilitated migration and trade. Tyndis was a major center of trade, next only to Muziris, between the Cheras and the Roman Empire.

Roman establishments in the port cities of the region, such as a temple of Augustus and barracks for garrisoned Roman soldiers, are marked in the Tabula Peutingeriana; the only surviving map of the Roman cursus publicus. Pliny the Elder (1st century CE) states that the port of Tyndis was located at the northwestern border of Keprobotos (Chera dynasty). The North Malabar region, which lies north of the port at Tyndis, was ruled by the kingdom of Ezhimala during Sangam period. The port of Tyndis which was on the northern side of Muziris, as mentioned in Greco-Roman writings, was somewhere near Kozhikode. Its exact location is a matter of dispute. The suggested locations are Ponnani, Tanur, Beypore-Chaliyam-Kadalundi-Vallikkunnu, and Koyilandy.

According to the Periplus of the Erythraean Sea, a region known as Limyrike began at Naura and Tyndis. However, Ptolemy mentions only Tyndis as the Limyrikes starting point. The region probably ended at Kanyakumari; it thus roughly corresponds to the present-day Malabar Coast. The value of Rome's annual trade with the region was estimated at 50,000,000 sesterces. Pliny the Elder mentioned that Limyrike was prone by pirates. The Cosmas Indicopleustes mentioned that the Limyrike was a source of Malabar peppers. Contemporary Tamil literature, Puṟanāṉūṟu and Akanaṉūṟu, speak of the Roman vessels and the Roman gold that used to come to the Kerala ports in search of Malabar pepper and other spices, which had enormous demand in the West. The contact with Middle East and Romans might have given rise to small colonies of Cochin Jews, Mappila Muslims, and Syrian Christians in the chief harbour towns of Kerala.

=== Satavahana Empire ===
The Śātavāhana Empire was a royal Indian dynasty based at present-day Amaravati in Andhra Pradesh as well as Junnar (Pune) and Pratisthana (Paithan) in present-day Maharashtra. The territory of the empire covered much of India from 300 BCE onward. Although there is some controversy about when the dynasty came to an end, the most liberal estimates suggest that it lasted about 450 years, until around 220 CE. The Satavahanas are credited for establishing peace in the country, resisting the onslaught of foreigners after the decline of Mauryan Empire.

Sātavāhanas started out as feudatories to the Mauryans, but declared independence with its decline. They are known for their patronage of Hinduism. The Sātavāhanas were one of the first Indian states to issue coins struck with their rulers embossed. They formed a cultural bridge and played a vital role in trade as well as the transfer of ideas and culture to and from the Indo-Gangetic Plain to the southern tip of India.

They had to compete with the Shungas and then the Kanvas of Magadha to establish their rule. Later, they played a crucial role to protect huge swathes of India against foreign invaders like the Sakas, Yavanas and Pahlavas. In particular their struggles with the Western Kshatrapas went on for a long time. The great Satavahana emperors Gautamiputra Satakarni and Sri Yajna Sātakarni repulsed foreign invasions from the likes of the Western Kshatrapas and stopped their expansion. In the 3rd century CE, the empire was split into smaller states.

=== Pallava dynasty ===
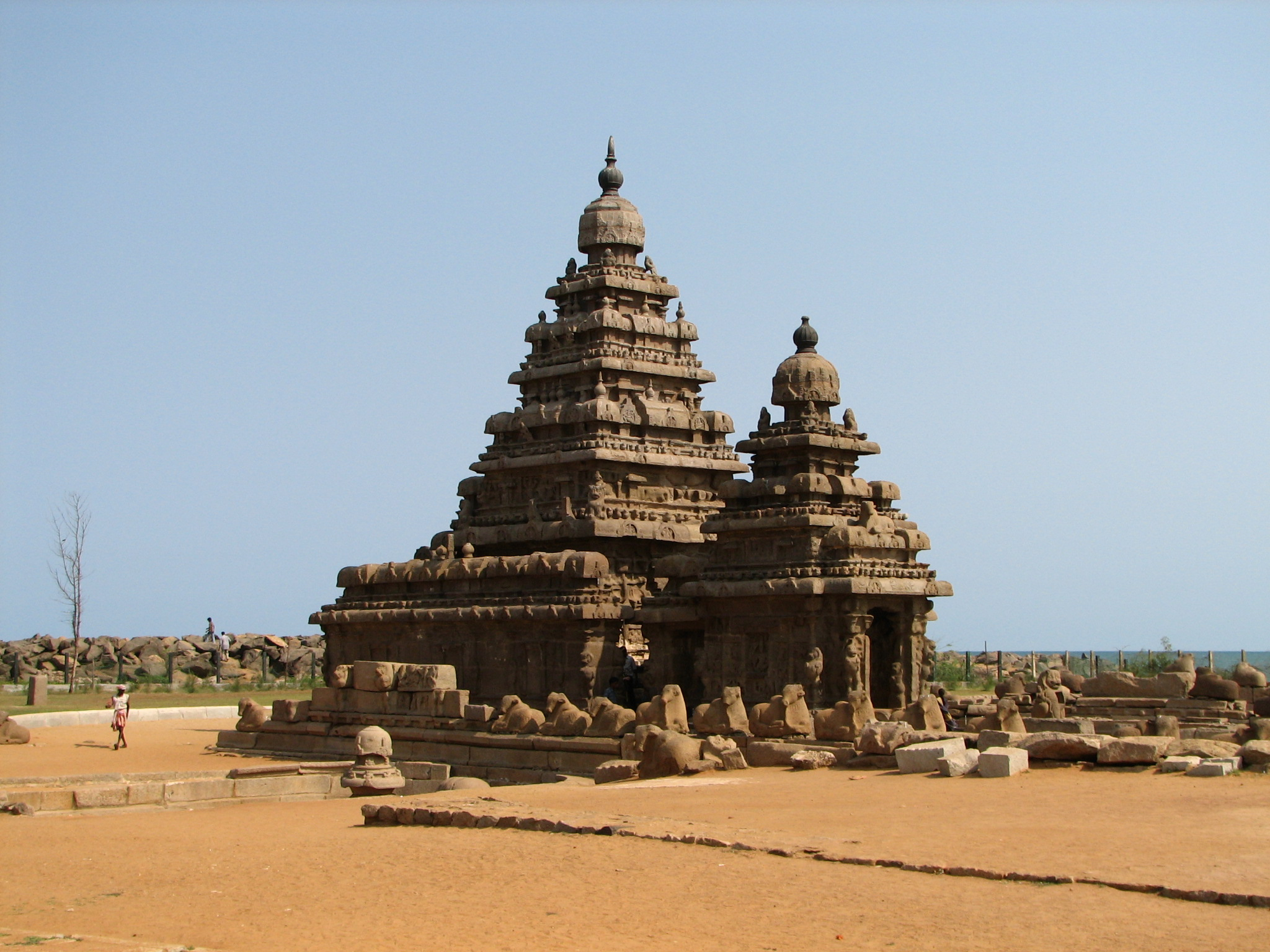
The Shore Temple in Mahabalipuram, Tamil Nadu, India. built by the Pallavas – a UNESCO World Heritage Site.

The Pallavas were a great Indian dynasty who ruled in southern India between the 3rd century CE until their final decline in the 9th century CE. Their capital was Kanchipuram in present-day Tamil Nadu. Their origins are not clearly known. However, it is surmised that they were Yadavas and they probably were feudatories of Satavahanas. Pallavas started their rule from Krishna River valley, known today as Palnadu, and subsequently spread to present-day southern Andhra Pradesh and northern Tamil Nadu. Mahendravarman I was a prominent Pallava monarch who began work on the rock-cut temples of Mahabalipuram. His son Narasimhavarman I ascended to the throne in 630 CE. He defeated the Chalukya emperor Pulakeshin II in 632 CE and burned the Chalukyan capital Vatapi. Pallavas and Pandyas dominated the southern regions of southern India between the 6th and the 9th centuries CE.

=== Kadambas of Banavasi ===
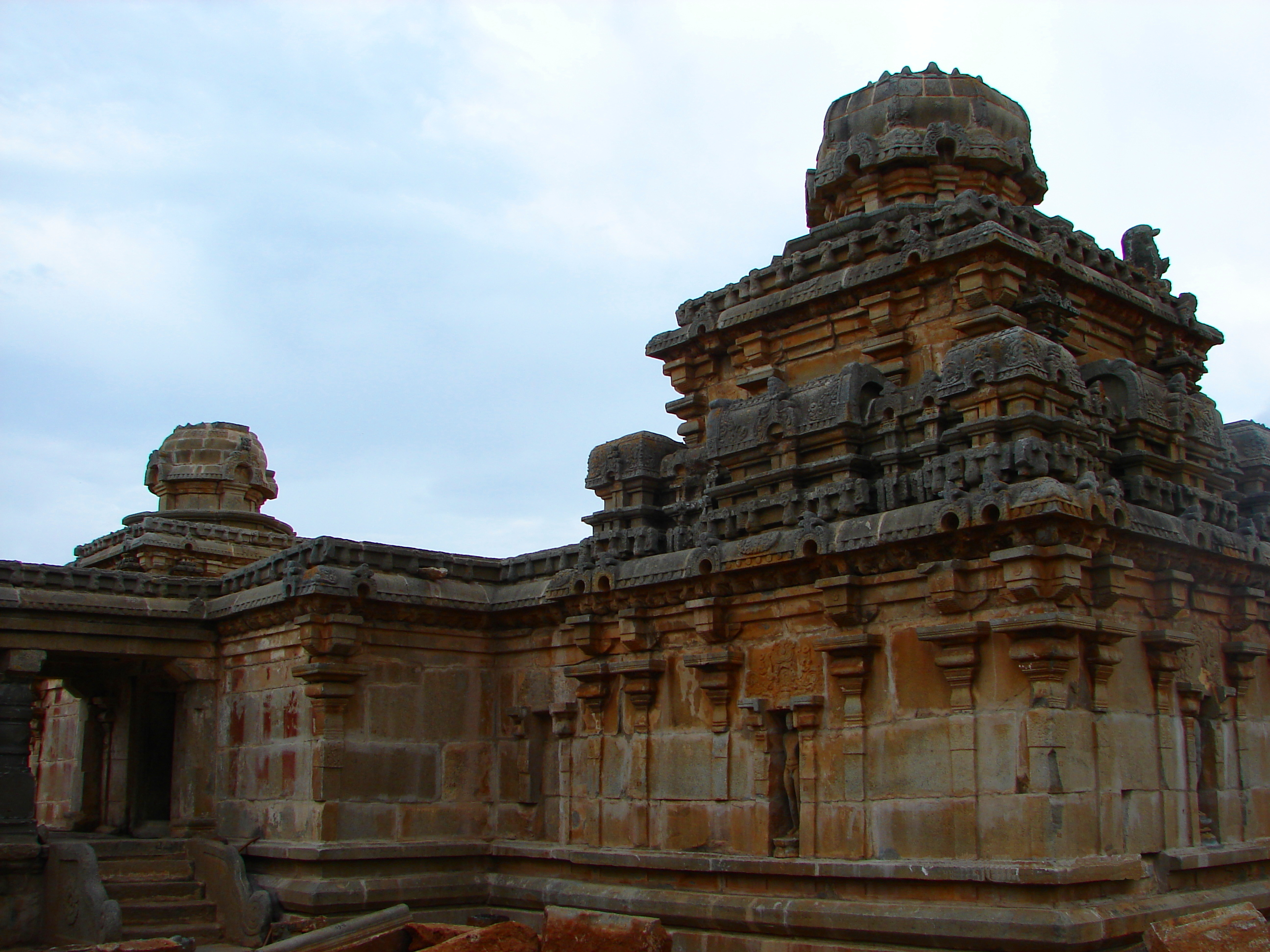
Panchakuta Basadi, 9th century, Jain, Kambadahalli, Mandya District, Karnataka.

Kadambas were one of the greatest kingdoms which ruled south India. Kadambas ruled during 345–525 CE. Their kingdom spanned the present day Karnataka state. Banavasi was their capital. They expanded their territories to cover Goa, Hanagal. The dynasty was founded by Mayura Sharma c. 345 CE. They built fine temples in Banavasi, Belgavi, Halsi and Goa. Kadambas were the first rulers to use Kannada as an administrative language as proven by the Halmidi inscription (450 CE) and Banavasi copper coin. With the rise of the Chalukya dynasty of Badami, the Kadambas ruled as their feudatory from 525 CE for another five hundred years.

=== Gangas of Talkad ===
The Western Ganga dynasty ruled southern Karnataka region during 350–550 CE. They continued to rule until the 10th century as feudatories of Rashtrakutas and Chalukyas. They rose from the region after the fall of the Satavahana empire and created a kingdom for themselves in Gangavadi (south Karnataka) while the Kadambas, their contemporaries, did the same in north Karnataka. The area they controlled was called Gangavadi which included the present-day districts of Mysore, Chamrajanagar, Tumkur, Kolar, Mandya and Bangalore. They continued to rule until the 10th century as feudatories of Rashtrakutas and Chalukyas. Gangas initially had their capital at Kolar, before moving it to Talakad near Mysore. They made a significant contribution to Kannada literature with such noted writers as King Durvinita, King Shivamara II and Chavundaraya. The famous Jain monuments at Shravanabelagola were built by them.

== Early Middle Ages ==
=== Chalukya Empire ===
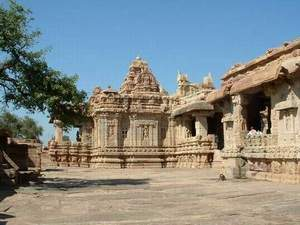
Badami Chalukya architecture, Virupaksha Temple, Pattadkal, Karnataka.

The Chalukyas ruled large parts of southern and central India between the 6th and the 12th centuries. During this period, they ruled as three related yet individual dynasties: Badami Chalukyas, Eastern Chalukyas, Western Chalukyas. The Badami Chalukyas were the earliest dynasty which ruled from Vatapi (modern Badami) from the middle of the 6th century. The Badami Chalukyas began to assert their independence at the decline of the Kadamba dynasty of Banavasi and rapidly rose to prominence during the reign of Pulakeshin II. After the death of Pulakeshin II, the Eastern Chalukyas became an independent kingdom in the eastern Deccan region. They ruled from Vengi until about the 11th century. In the western Deccan, the rise of the Rashtrakutas in the middle of the 8th century eclipsed the Badami Chalukyas before being revived by their descendants, the Western Chalukyas, in the late 10th century. The Western Chalukyas ruled from Kalyani (modern Basavakalyan) until the end of the 12th century.

One of the first kings of the Chalukyan dynasty was Pulakeshin I. He ruled from Badami in Karnataka. His son Pulakeshin II became the monarch of the Chalukyan empire in 610 CE and ruled until 642 CE. Pulakeshin II is most remembered for the battle he fought and won against Emperor Harshavardhana in 637 CE. He also defeated the Pallava king Mahendravarman I. The Chalukya empire existed from 543 to 757 CE and an area stretching from Kaveri to Narmada rivers. The Chalukyas created the Chalukyan style of architecture. Great monuments were built in Pattadakal, Aihole and Badami. These temples exhibit the evolution of the Vesara style of architecture.

The Eastern Chalukyas ruled along the eastern coast of southern India around the present-day Vijayawada. The Eastern Chalukya dynasty was created by Kubja Vishnuvardhana, a brother of emperor Pulakeshin II. The Eastern Chalukyas continued to rule for over five hundred years and were in close alliance with the Cholas.

=== Rashtrakuta Empire ===
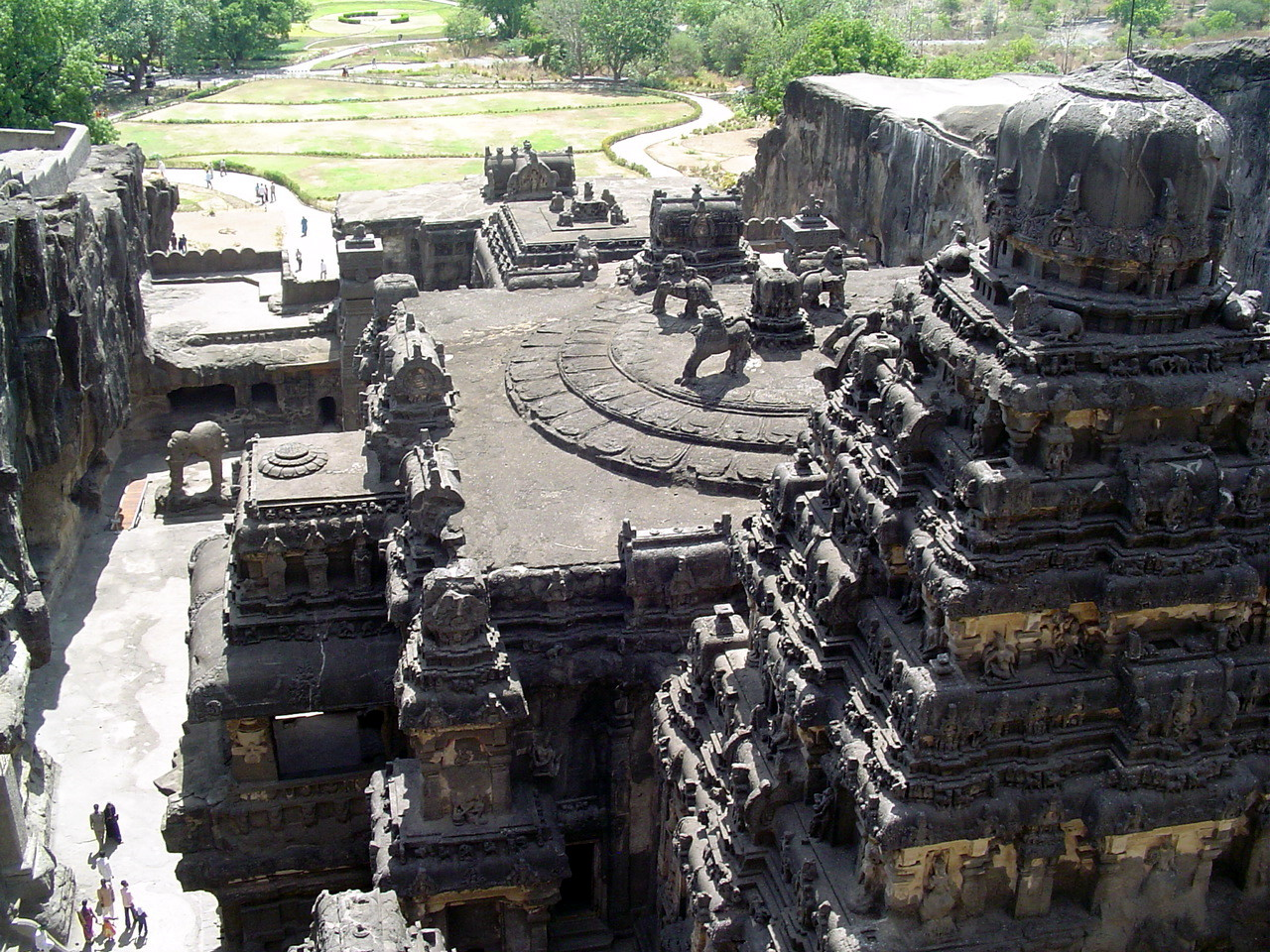
Rashtrakuta architecture, Kailasanatha Temple, in Ellora Caves, Maharashtra.

The Rashtrakuta Empire ruled from Manyaketha in Kalaburagi from 735 CE until 982 CE and reached its peak under Amoghavarsha I (reign. 814 – 878 CE), considered Ashoka of South India. The Rashtrakutas came to power at the decline of the Badami Chalukyas and were involved in a three-way power struggle for control of the Gangetic plains with the Prathihara of Gujarat and Palas of Bengal. The Rashtrakutas commissioned some of the beautiful rock-cut temples of Ellora including the Kailasa temple. Kannada language literature flourished during this period of Adikavi Pampa, Sri Ponna and Shivakotiacharya. Emperor Amoghavarsha I wrote the earliest extant Kannada classic Kavirajamarga.

=== Second Cheras of Mahodayapuram ===
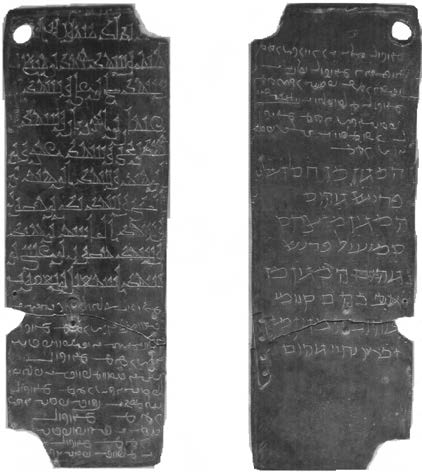
Quilon Syrian copper plates granted to Saint Thomas Christians testify the role of merchant guilds and trade corporations in Early Medieval Kerala. The sixth plate also contains a number of signatures of the witnesses to the grant in Arabic (Kufic script), Middle Persian (cursive Pahlavi script) and Judeo-Persian (standard square Hebrew script).

Much of history of the region of Kerala from the 6th to the 8th century is obscure. From the Kodungallur line of the Cheras rose the Kulasekhara dynasty, which was established by Kulasekhara Varman. At its zenith these Later Cheras ruled over a territory comprising the whole of modern Kerala and a smaller part of modern Tamil Nadu. During the early part of Kulasekhara period, the southern region from Nagercoil to Thiruvananthapuram was ruled by Ay kings, who lost their power in the 10th century and thus the region became a part of the Cheras. Kerala witnessed a flourishing period of art, literature, trade and the Bhakti movement of Hinduism. A Keralite identity, distinct from the Tamils, became linguistically separate during this period. The origin of Malayalam calendar dates back to year 825 CE. For the local administration, the empire was divided into provinces under the rule of Nair Chieftains known as Naduvazhis, with each province comprising a number of Desams under the control of chieftains, called as Desavazhis. The era witnessed also a shift in political power, evidenced by a gradual increase of Namboothiri Brahmin settlements, who established the caste hierarchy in Kerala by assigning different groups separate positions. As a result, many temples were constructed across Kerala, which according to M. T. Narayanan "became cornerstones of the socio-economic society". Mamankam festival, which was the largest native festival, was held at Tirunavaya near Kuttippuram, on the bank of river Bharathappuzha. Athavanad, the headquarters of Azhvanchery Thamprakkal, who were also considered as the supreme religious chief of the Nambudiri Brahmins of Kerala, is also located near Tirunavaya.

Sulaiman al-Tajir, a Persian merchant who visited Kerala during the reign of Sthanu Ravi Varma (9th century CE), records that there was extensive trade between Kerala and China at that time, based at the port of Kollam. A number of foreign accounts have mentioned about the presence of considerable Muslim population in the coastal towns. Arab writers such as Al-Masudi of Baghdad (896–956 CE), Muhammad al-Idrisi (1100–1165 CE), Abulfeda (1273–1331 CE), and Al-Dimashqi (1256–1327 CE) mention the Muslim communities in Kerala. Some historians assume that the Mappilas can be considered as the first native, settled Muslim community in South Asia.

The inhibitions, caused by a series of Chera-Chola wars in the 11th century, resulted in the decline of foreign trade in Kerala ports. In addition, Portuguese invasions in the 15th century caused two major religions, Buddhism and Jainism, to disappear from the land. It is known that the Menons in the Malabar region of Kerala were originally strong believers of Jainism. The social system became fractured with divisions on caste lines. The Kulasekhara dynasty was finally subjugated in 1102 by the combined attack of the Pandyas and Cholas. However, in the 14th century, Ravi Varma Kulashekhara (1299–1314) of the southern Venad kingdom was able to establish a short-lived supremacy over southern India. After his death, in the absence of strong central power, the state was fractured into about thirty small warring principalities under Nair Chieftains; the most powerful of them were the kingdom of Samuthiri in the north, Venad in the south and Kochi in the middle. The port at Kozhikode held the superior economic and political position in Kerala, while Kollam (Quilon), Kochi, and Kannur (Cannanore) were commercially confined to secondary roles.

=== Western Chalukya Empire ===
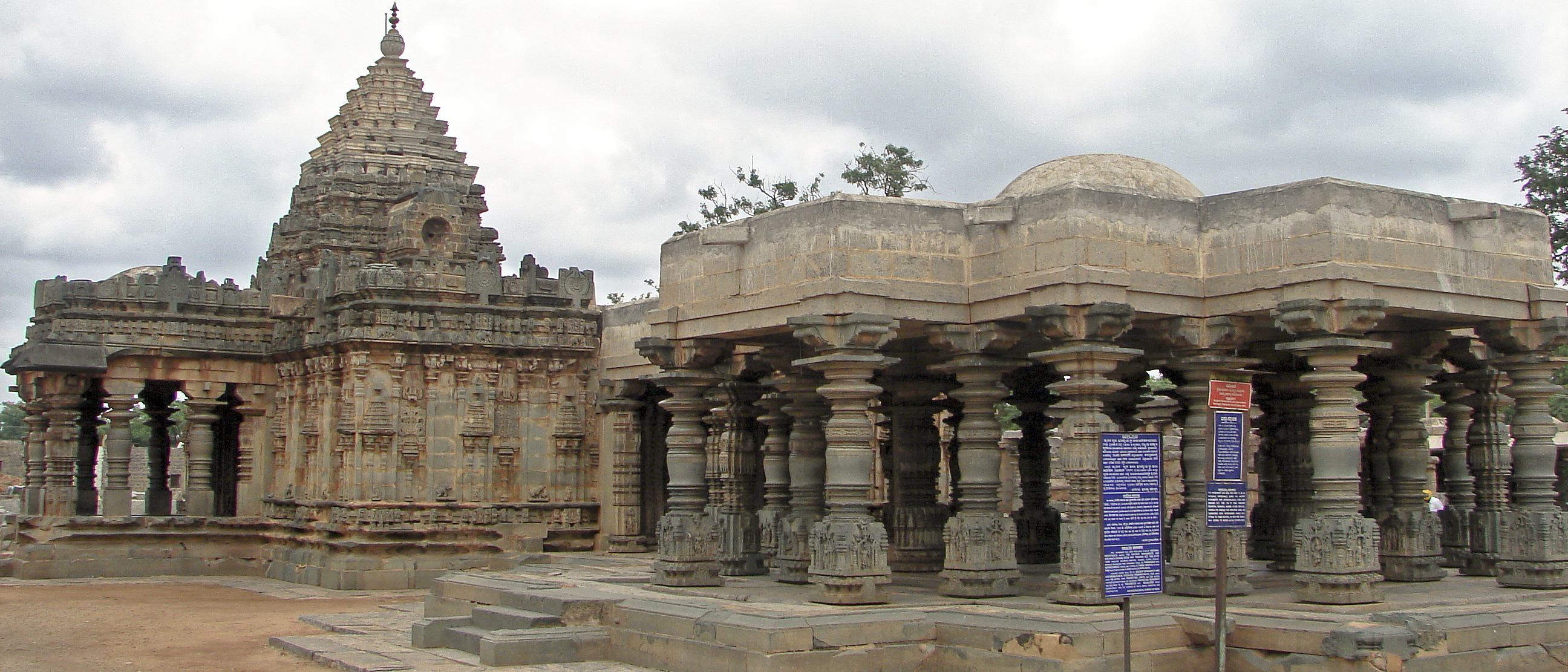
Mahadeva Temple at Itagi in the Koppal district, 1112 CE, an example of dravida articulation with a nagara superstructure

The Western Chalukya Empire was created by the descendants of the Badami Chalukya clan and ruled from 973 to 1195 CE. Their capital was Kalyani, present day Basava Kalyana in Karnataka. They came to power at the decline of the Rashtrakutas. They ruled from the Kaveri in the South to Gujarat in the north. The empire reached its peak under Vikramaditya VI. The Kalyani Chalukyas promoted the Gadag style of architecture, excellent examples of which are present in Gadag, Dharwad, Koppal and Haveri districts of Karnataka. They patronised great Kannada poets such as Ranna and Nagavarma II and is considered as a golden age of Kannada literature. The Vachana Sahitya style of native Kannada poetry flourished during these times.

=== Hoysala dynasty ===
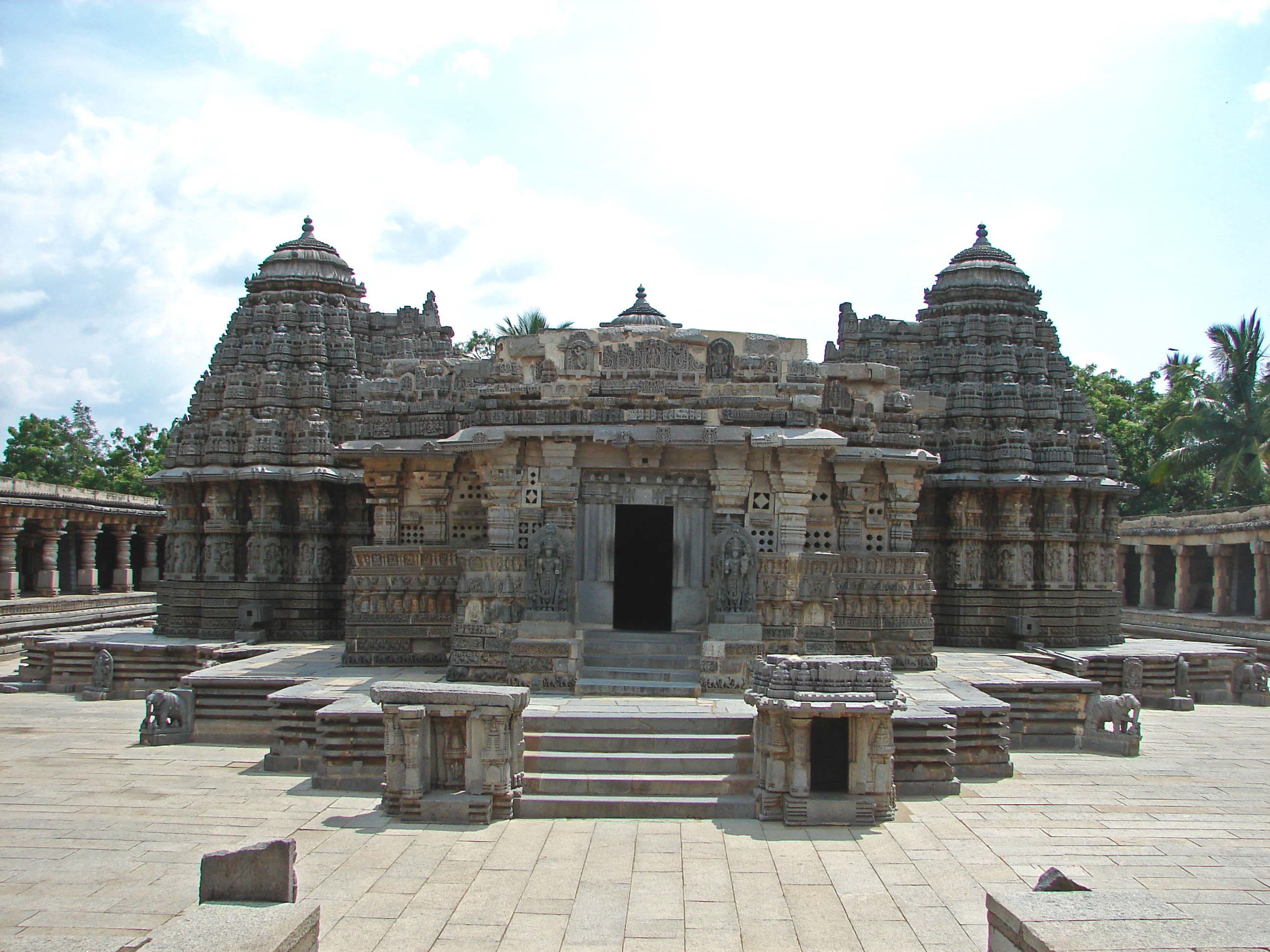
Keshava temple, Somanathapura, Karnataka.

Hoysalas began their rule as subordinates of the Chalukyas of Kalyani and gradually established their own empire. Nripa Kama Hoysala who ruled in the western region of Gangavadi, founded the Hoysala dynasty. His later successor Ballala I reigned from his capital at Belur. Vishnuvardhana Hoysala (1106–1152 CE) conquered the Nolamba region earning the title Nolambavadi Gonda. Some of the most magnificent specimens of South Indian temples are those attributed to the Hoysala dynasty of Karnataka. Vesara style reached its peak in their period. Hoysalas period is remembered today as one of the brightest periods in the history of Karnataka. They ruled Karnataka for over three centuries from c. 1000 to 1342 CE. The most famous kings among the Hoysalas were Vishnuvardhana, Veera Ballala II and Veera Ballala III. Jainism flourished during the Hoysala period. Ramanuja, the founder of Shri Vaishnavism or Vishishtadvaita Vedanta, came to Hoysala kingdom to spread his school of qualified-monism Hindu thought. Hoysalas encouraged both Kannada and Sanskrit literature and earned a great name as builders of temples at Belur, Halebidu, Somanathapura, Belavadi and Amrithapura. Such famous poets as Rudrabhatta, Janna, Raghavanka and Harihara wrote many classics in Kannada during this time.

=== The Kakatiyas ===
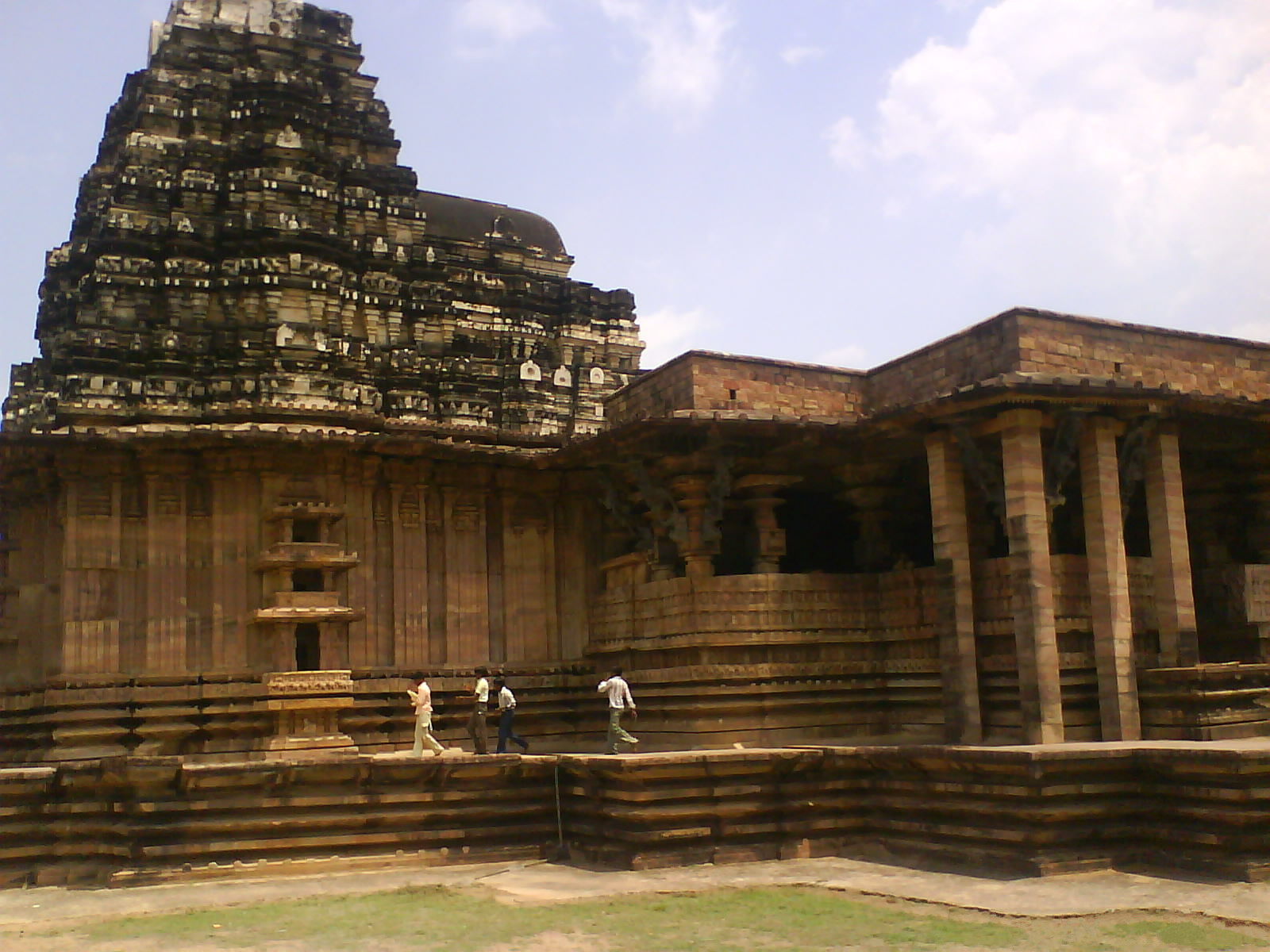
Ramappa temple in Warangal

The Kakatiya dynasty rose to prominence in the 11th century with the decline of the Chalukyas. By the early 12th century, the Kakatiya Durjaya clan declared independence and began expanding their kingdom. By the end of the century, their kingdom had reached the Bay of Bengal and it stretched between the Godavari and the Krishna rivers. The empire reached its zenith under Ganapatideva who was its greatest ruler, responsible for uniting the upper and lower regions of eastern Deccan that spoke the Telugu language, for the first time. At its largest, the empire included most of modern-day Andhra Pradesh, Telangana and parts of Odisha, Tamil Nadu, Chhattisgarh, Maharashtra and Karnataka. Ganapatideva was succeeded by his daughter Rudramba who became the famous warrior-queen Rudrama Devi. The Kakatiya dynasty lasted for three centuries, but their existence can be dated back to the 7th century as per inscriptions although they only served as local chieftains to Chalukyas and Rashtrakutas. Warangal was their capital which was founded in the 12th century. Marco Polo visited Warangal in 1289 and wrote extensively on the kingdom, the city, the queen Rudrama Devi, the prosperity and wealth of the kingdom and the way people live. By the early 14th century, the Kakatiya dynasty attracted the attention of the Delhi Sultanate under Alauddin Khalji. Despite defeating the first attempt in 1303, it paid tribute to the Khaljis for a few years from 1310 after a successful siege by Malik Kafur and was besieged again in 1318 by Khusrau Khan. But they refused to pay tribute to the new Tughluq regime in 1320, which prompted annexation of the Telugu country by the Sultan Ghiyath al-Din Tughluq. The Kakatiyas were eventually conquered by the forces of his successor Muhammad bin Tughluq in 1323. The Kakatiyas were well-versed in administrative duties, military affairs, social policy and diplomatic affairs, developing a unique social structure which differed from other medieval Hindu kingdoms of the subcontinent. Their encouragement of cultural influences from the neighbouring Andhra region in Telangana and vice versa ushered in an era of prosperity and standard of living in both regions. It was made possible due to extensive building of irrigation tanks, artificial lakes and other kinds of small and large reservoirs, interconnected through linking techniques, which helped in converting the dry, arid and rugged areas of Kakatiya territory into a strong, wealthy and stable abode for people who migrated and settled in Telangana. The system of employing capable military officers (nayakas) from any background as part of earning new loyalists for the kings was pursued by them first and then implemented by the Vijayanagara Empire. They were egalitarian rulers who despite adhering to the varna system rewarded those who served the kingdom with loyalty. Their encouragement of inland and maritime trade with safety incentives and exemptions for merchants who faced loss in their sea-borne journey greatly developed commerce with other nations and faraway kingdoms, bringing vast amounts of riches. The Kakatiya legacy is preserved in the form of arts, literature and architecture as well as reservoirs which survive in Telangana. Their patronage of artisans, poets and musicians, also followed by subordinate kings, led to an extensive growth of Telugu language, customs and the overall culture associated with it. Their architectural legacy, borrowed from Western Chalukyas and later developing it into a distinctive style identified with the kingdom, is preserved in the form of forts, temples and gateways. Notable among these are the Warangal Fort, Kakatiya Kala Thoranam, Thousand Pillar Temple, Ramappa Temple, Kota Gullu, Elgandal Fort, Medak Fort and the temples at Pillalamarri in Suryapet. They built large reservoirs like the Pakhal Lake, Ramappa Lake, Bhadrakali Lake and Laknavaram Lake along with other bigger and smaller yet significant ones. They were also very likely to be the original holders of the Koh-i-Noor diamond which was mined in Kollur, Andhra Pradesh and the existence of diamond trade and markets were also mentioned in the writings of Marco Polo.

=== Kolathunadu ===
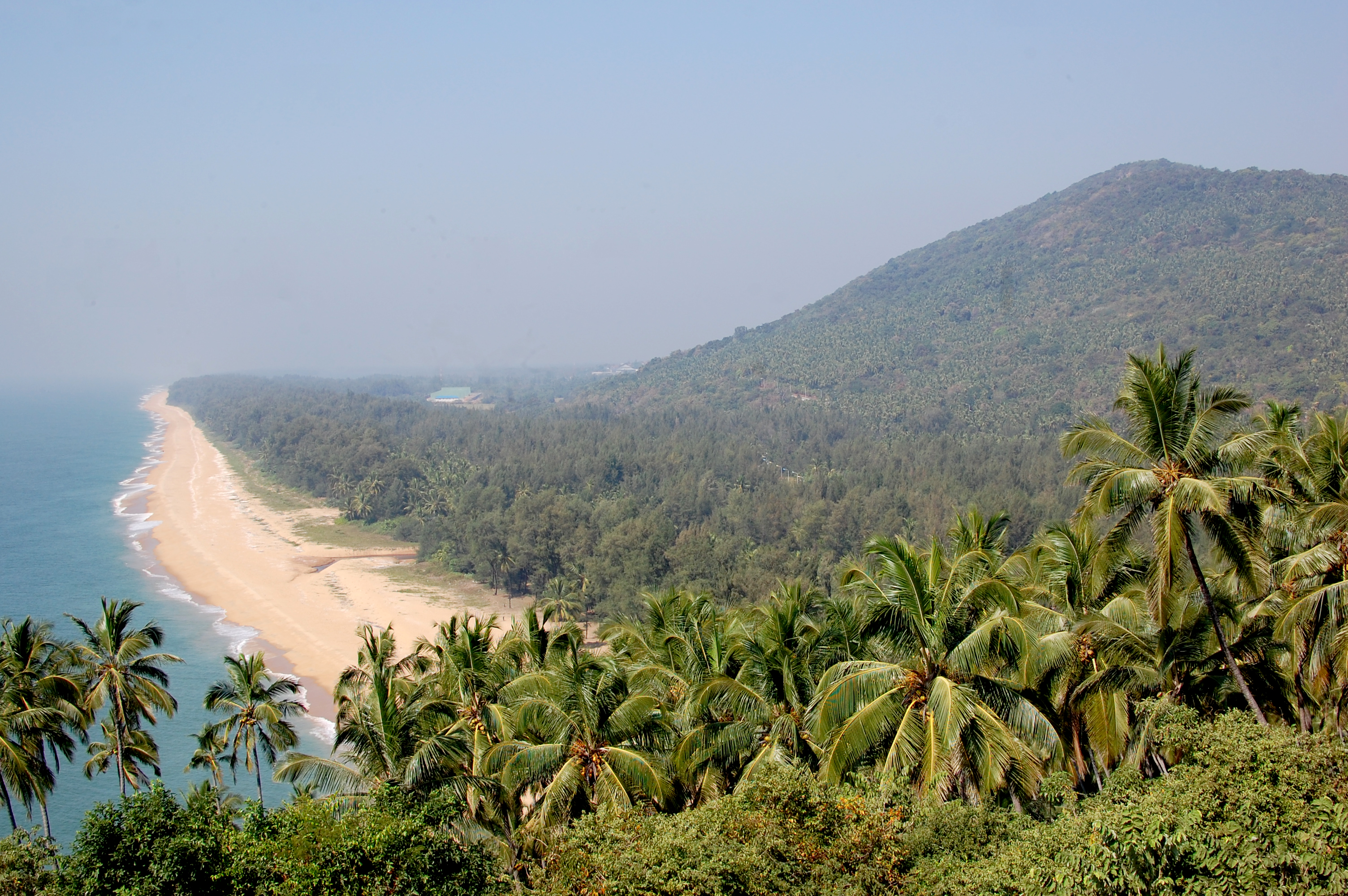
Ezhimala, the early headquarters of the Mushika dynasty of North Malabar

The ancient kingdom of Ezhimala in Northern Kerala had jurisdiction over the North Malabar which consisted of two Nadus (regions)- The coastal Poozhinadu and the hilly eastern Karkanadu. According to the works of Sangam literature, Poozhinadu consisted much of the coastal belt between Mangalore and Kozhikode. Karkanadu consisted of Wayanad-Gudalur hilly region with parts of Kodagu (Coorg). It is said that Nannan, the most renowned ruler of Ezhimala dynasty, took refuge at Wayanad hills in the 5th century CE when he was lost to Cheras, just before his execution in a battle, according to the Sangam works. Ezhimala kingdom was succeeded by Mushika dynasty in the early medieval period, most possibly due to the migration of Tuluva Brahmins from Tulu Nadu. The Mushika-vamsha Mahakavya, written by Athula in the 11th century, throws light on the recorded past of the Mushika royal family up until that point. The Indian anthropologist Ayinapalli Aiyappan states that a powerful and warlike clan of the Bunt community of Tulu Nadu was called Kola Bari and the Kolathiri Raja of Kolathunadu was a descendant of this clan.

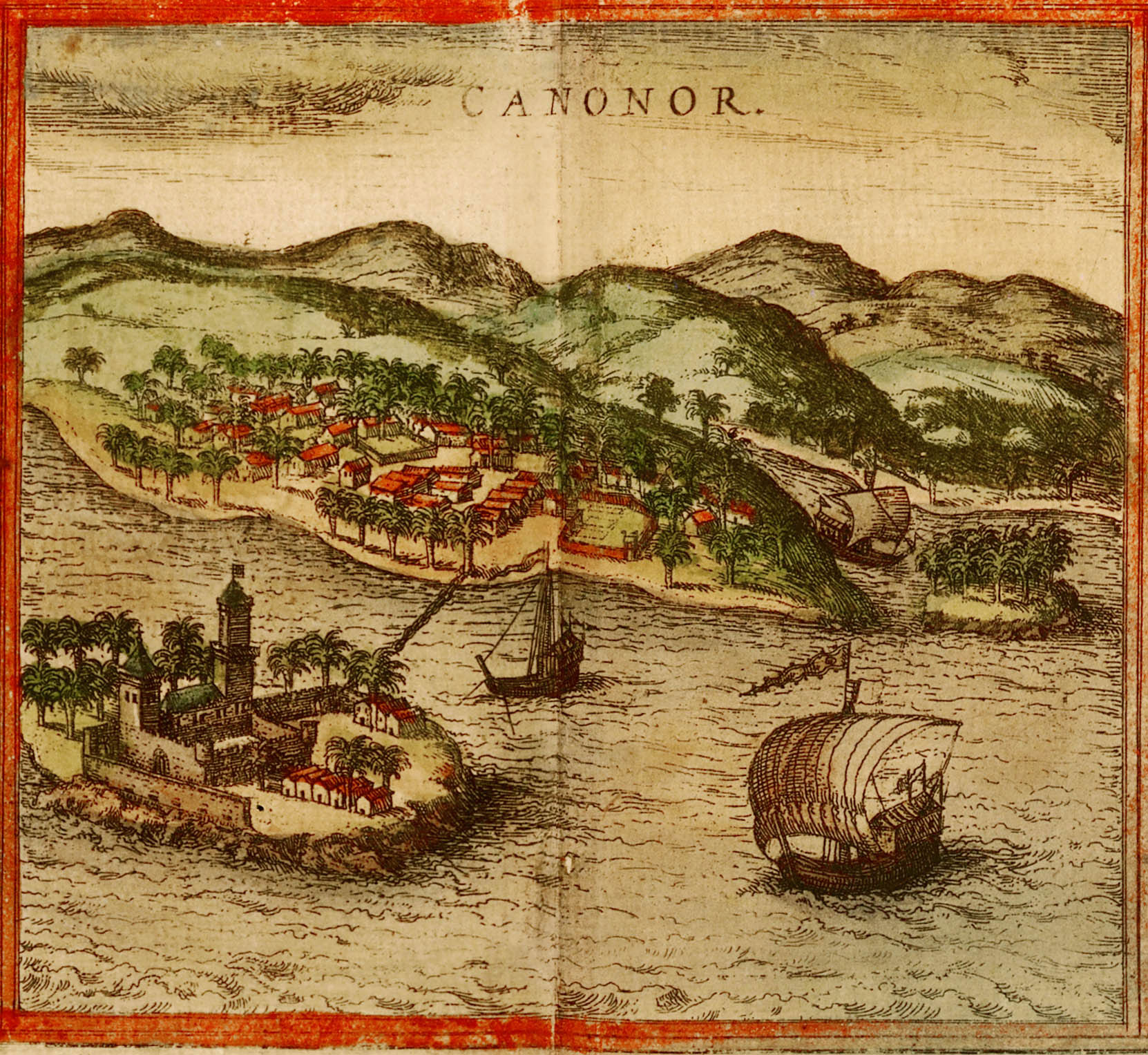
A portrait of Kannur, the largest city of North Malabar, drawn in 1572, from Georg Braun and Frans Hogenberg's atlas Civitates orbis terrarum, Volume I

The kingdom of Kolathunadu, who were the descendants of Mushika dynasty, at the peak of its power reportedly extended from Netravati River (Mangalore) in the north to Korapuzha (Kozhikode) in the south with Arabian Sea on the west and Kodagu hills on the eastern boundary, also including the isolated islands of Lakshadweep in Arabian Sea. An Old Malayalam inscription (Ramanthali inscriptions), dated to 1075 CE, mentioning king Kunda Alupa, the ruler of Alupa dynasty of Mangalore, can be found at Ezhimala near Kannur. The Arabic inscription on a copper slab within the Madayi Mosque in Kannur records its foundation year as 1124 CE. In his book on travels (Il Milione), Marco Polo recounts his visit to the area in the mid 1290s. Other visitors included Faxian, the Buddhist pilgrim and Ibn Batuta, writer and historian of Tangiers. The Kolathunadu in the late medieval period emerged into independent 10 principalities i.e., Kadathanadu (Vadakara), Randathara or Poyanad (Dharmadom), Kottayam (Thalassery), Nileshwaram, Iruvazhinadu (Panoor), Kurumbranad etc., under separate royal chieftains due to the outcome of internal dissensions. The Nileshwaram dynasty on the northernmost part of Kolathiri dominion, were relatives to both Kolathunadu as well as the Zamorin of Calicut, in the early medieval period. The kingdom of Kumbla in the northernmost region of the modern state of Kerala, who had jurisdiction over the Taluks of Manjeshwar and Kasaragod, and parts of Mangalore in Southern Tulu Nadu, were also vassals to the kingdom of Kolathunadu until the Carnatic conquests of the 15th century CE.

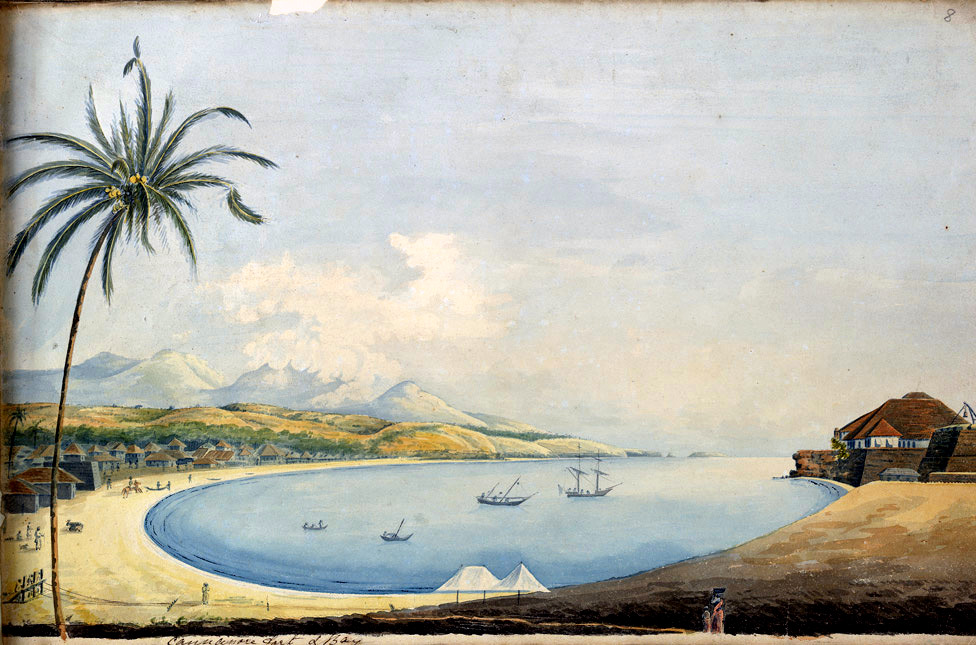
Kannur fort and Bay; a watercolor by John Johnston (1795–1801)

According to Kerala Muslim tradition, the North Malabar region was also home to several oldest mosques in the Indian subcontinent. According to the Legend of Cheraman Perumals, the first Indian mosque was built in 624 CE at Kodungallur with the mandate of the last the ruler (the Cheraman Perumal) of Chera dynasty, who left from Dharmadom near Kannur to Mecca and converted to Islam during the lifetime of Muhammad (c. 570–632). According to Qissat Shakarwati Farmad, the Masjids at Kodungallur, Kollam, Madayi, Barkur, Mangalore, Kasaragod, Kannur, Dharmadam, Panthalayani, and Chaliyam, were built during the era of Malik Dinar, and they are among the oldest Masjids in the Indian subcontinent. It is believed that Malik Dinar died at Thalangara in Kasaragod town. The Koyilandy Jumu'ah Mosque in the erstwhile Kolathunadu contains an Old Malayalam inscription written in a mixture of Vatteluttu and Grantha scripts which dates back to the 10th century CE. It is a rare surviving document recording patronage by a Hindu king (Bhaskara Ravi) to the Muslims of Kerala.

=== Musunuri ===
After the downfall of Kakatiya empire, two cousins known as Musunuri Nayaks rebelled against the Delhi Sultanate and recaptured Warangal and brought the whole of Telugu-speaking areas under their control. Although short lived (50 years), the Nayak rule is considered a watershed in the history of southern India. Their rule inspired the establishment of Vijayanagara empire.

=== Reddy dynasty ===
The Reddy dynasty was established by Prolaya Vema Reddy. The region that was ruled by the Reddy dynasty is now in Andhra Pradesh except some areas of Chitoor, Anantapur and Kurnool districts. Prolaya Vema Reddy was part of the confederation that started a movement against the invading Turkic Muslim armies of the Delhi Sultanate in 1323 CE and succeeded in repulsing them from Warangal. Reddys ruled coastal and central Andhra for over a hundred years from 1325 to 1448 CE. At its maximum extent, the Reddy kingdom stretched from Cuttak, Odisha to the north, Kanchi to the south and Srisailam to the west. The initial capital of the kingdom was Addanki. Later, it was moved to Kondavidu and subsequently to Rajahmundry. The Reddis were known for their fortifications. Two major hill forts, one at Kondapalli, 20 km north west of Vijayawada and another at Kondaveedu about 30 km west of Guntur stand testimony to the fort building skill of the Reddi kings. The forts of Bellamkonda, Vinukonda and Nagarjunakonda in the Palnadu region were also part of the Reddi kingdom.

The dynasty remained in power until the middle of the 15th century and was supplanted by the Gajapatis of Odisha, who gained control of coastal Andhra. The Gajapatis eventually lost control of coastal Andhra after Gajapati Prataprudra Deva was defeated by Emperor Krishna Deva Raya of Vijayanagara. The territories of the Reddi kingdom eventually came under the control of the Vijayanagara Empire.

== Late Middle Ages ==
=== Rise of Islamic dynasties ===
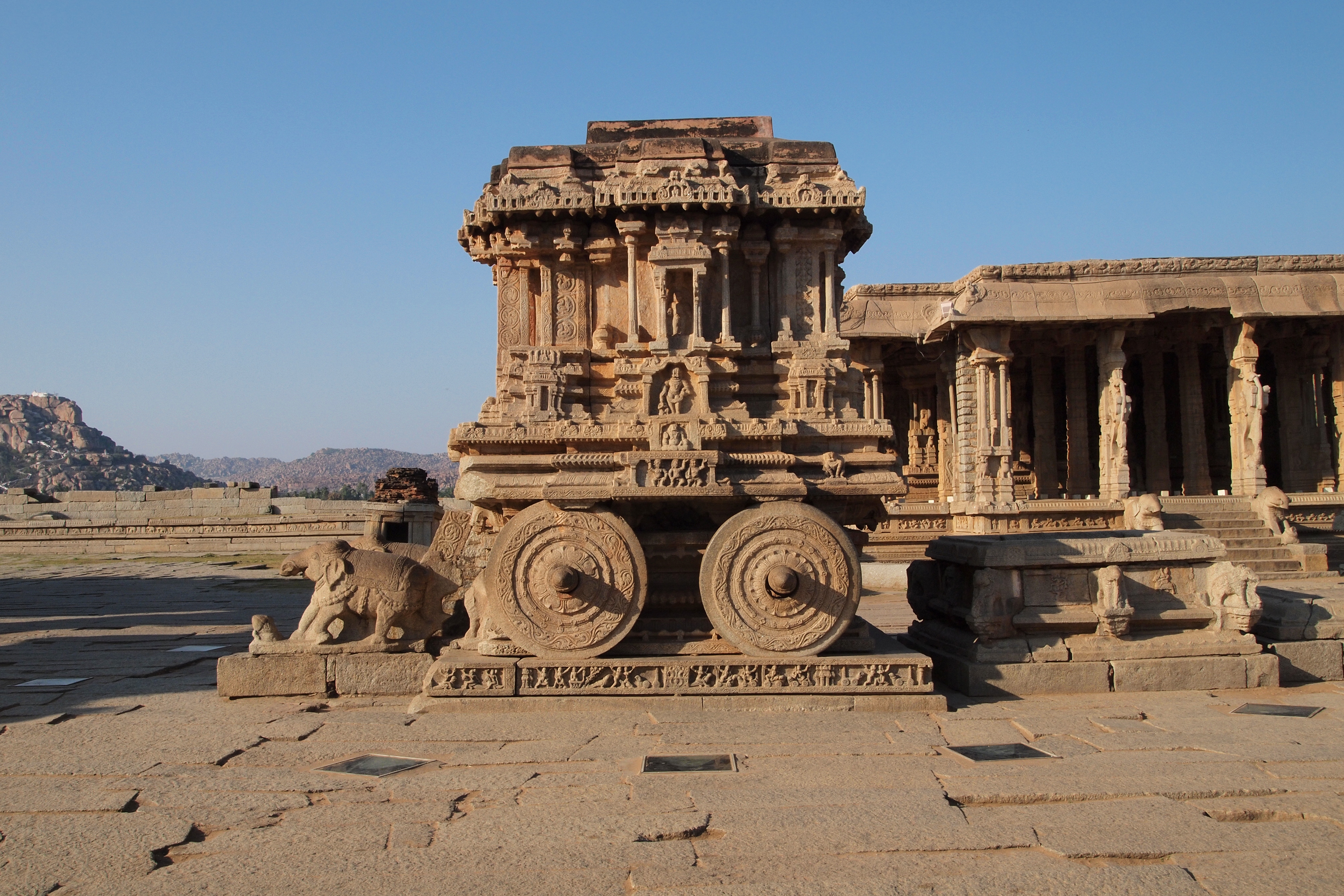
Vijayanagara architecture, Stone chariot in Vittala temple, Hampi, Karnataka

The early medieval period saw the rise of Muslim dynasties in peninsular India. The defeat of the Kakatiyas of Warangal by the forces of the Delhi Sultanate in 1323 CE and the defeat of the Hoysalas in 1333 CE heralded a new chapter in southern Indian history. The grand struggle of the period was between the Vijayanagara Empire with its imperial capital in Vijayanagara and the Bahmani Sultanate based in Gulbarga in present-day Karnataka. By the early 16th century, the Bahmani sultanate fragmented into five different sultanates based in Ahmednagar, Berar, Bidar, Bijapur and Golconda, together called the Deccan Sultanates.

On the southwestern coast of India, a new local economic and political power arose into the vacuum created by the disintegration of Chera power. The Zamorins of Calicut, in collaboration with Arab-Muslim merchants, dominated the maritime trade on Malabar Coast for the next few centuries.

=== Vijayanagara Empire ===
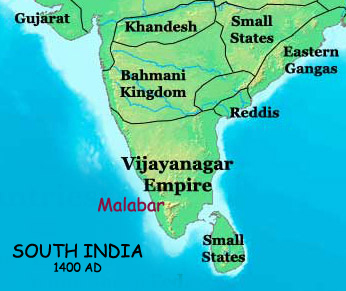
Map of South India in the 15th century

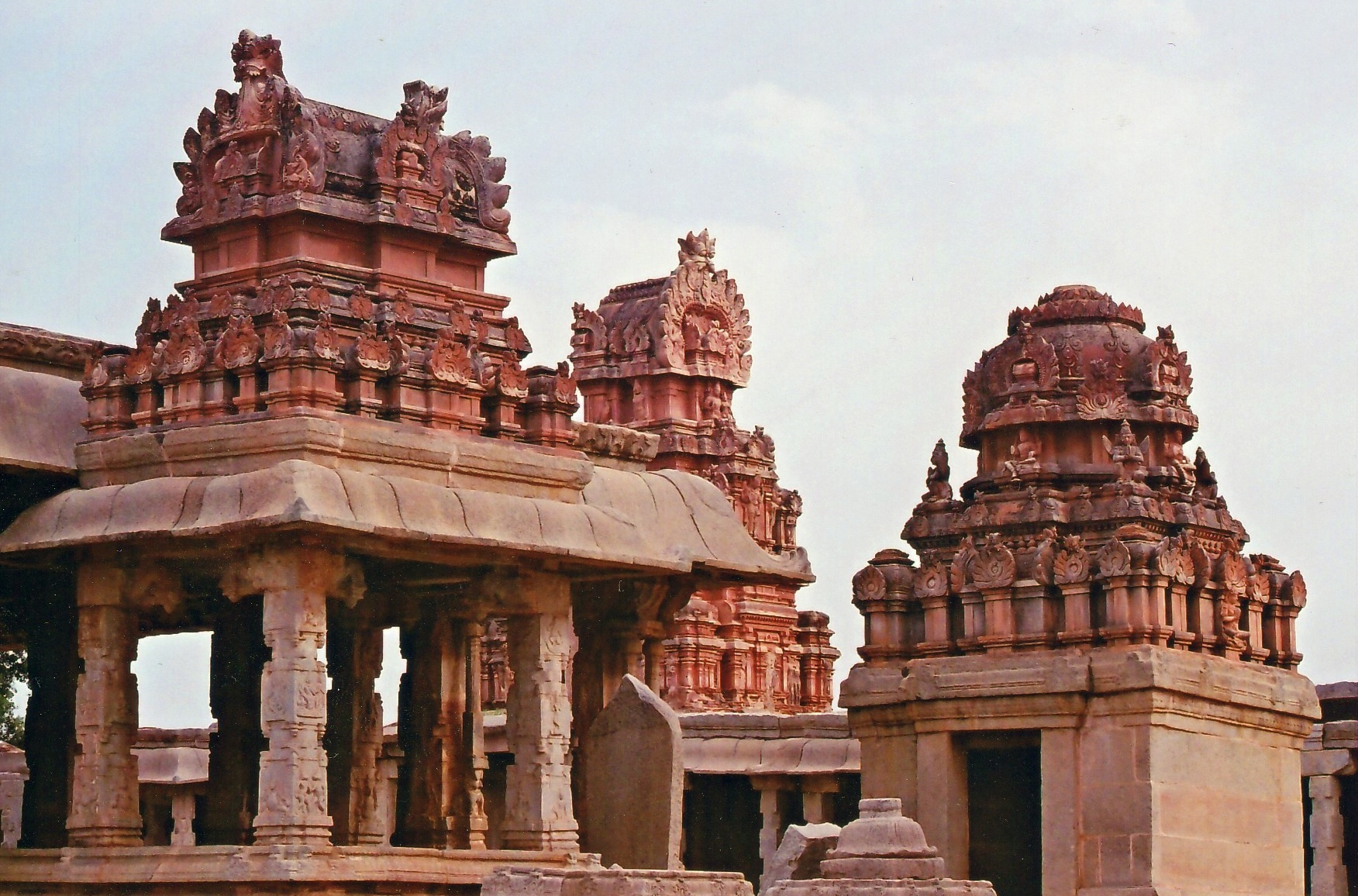
Chalukya influence in pillar design, and Dravida Vimana, at Krishna temple in Hampi

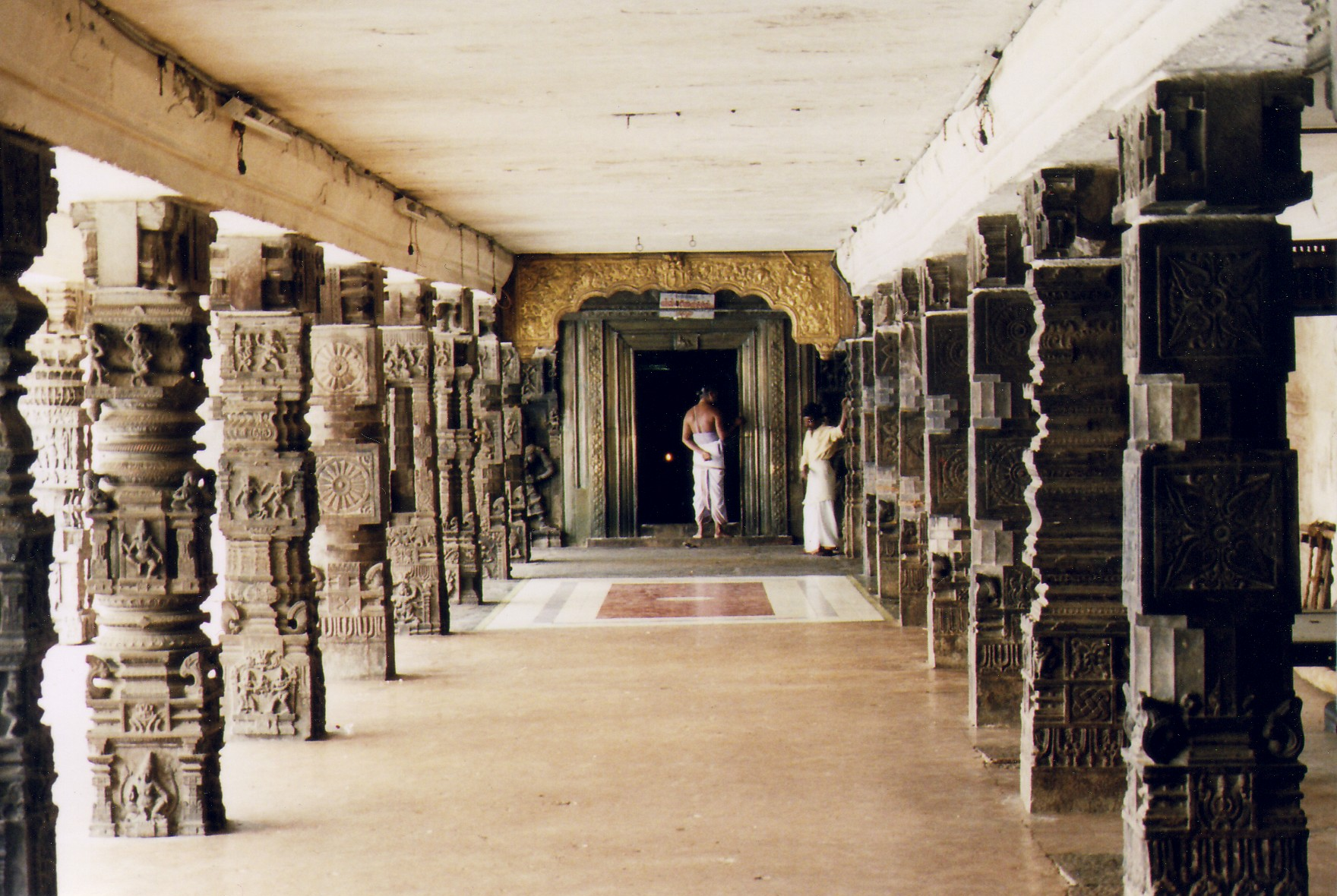
Kalyanamantapa in Cheluva Narayanaswamy temple in Melkote

Differing theories have been proposed regarding the Vijayanagara empire's origins. Many historians propose Harihara I and Bukka Raya I, the founders of the empire, were Kannadigas and commanders in the army of the Hoysala Empire stationed in the Tungabhadra region to ward off Muslim invasions from the Northern India. Others claim that they were Telugu people first associated with the Kakatiya kingdom who took control of the northern parts of the Hoysala Empire during its decline. Irrespective of their origin, historians agree the founders were supported and inspired by Vidyaranya, a saint at the Sringeri monastery to fight the Muslim invasions of southern India. Writings by foreign travelers during the late medieval era combined with recent excavations in the Vijayanagara principality have uncovered much-needed information about the empire's history, fortifications, scientific developments and architectural innovations.

Before the early 14th-century rise of the Vijayanagara Empire, the Indian-Hindu states of the Deccan, the Yadava Empire of Devagiri, the Kakatiya Kingdom of Warangal, the Pandyan Empire of Madurai, and the tiny kingdom of Kampili had been repeatedly invaded by Muslims from the north, and by 1336 they had all been defeated by Alauddin Khalji and Muhammad bin Tughluq, the Sultans of Delhi. The Hoysala Empire was the sole remaining Hindu state in the path of the Islamic invasion. After the death of Hoysala monarch Veera Ballala III during a battle against the Sultan of Madurai in 1343, the Hoysala Empire merged with the growing Vijayanagara empire.

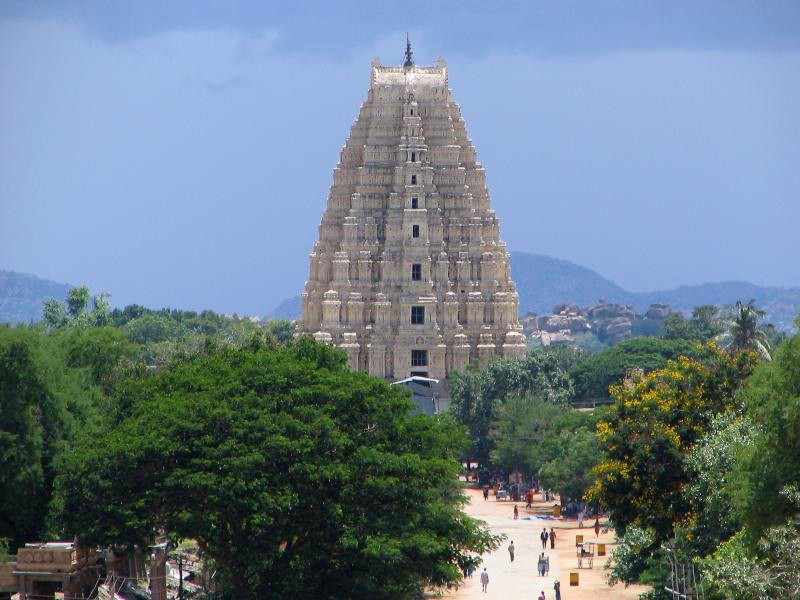
Virupaksha temple, Hampi

In the first two decades after the founding of the empire, Harihara I gained control over most of the area south of the Tungabhadra river and earned the title of Purvapaschima Samudradhishavara ("master of the eastern and western seas"). By 1374 Bukka Raya I, successor to Harihara I, had defeated the chiefdom of Arcot, the Reddys of Kondavidu, the Sultan of Madurai and gained control over Goa in the west and the Tungabhadra-Krishna River doab in the north. The original capital was in the principality of Anegondi on the northern banks of the Tungabhadra River in today's Karnataka. It was later moved to nearby Vijayanagara on the river's southern banks during the reign of Bukka Raya I.

With the Vijayanagara Kingdom now imperial in stature, Harihara II, the second son of Bukka Raya I, further consolidated the empire beyond the Krishna River and brought the whole of southern India under the Vijayanagara umbrella. The next emperor, Deva Raya I, emerged successful against the Gajapatis of Odisha and undertook important works of fortification and irrigation. Deva Raya II (called Gajabetekara) succeeded to the throne in 1424 and was possibly the most capable of the Sangama emperors. He quelled rebelling feudal lords as well as the Zamorin of Calicut and Quilon in the south. He conquered the island of Lanka and became overlord of the kings of Burma at Pegu and Tanasserim. The empire was in decline in the late 15th century until the serious attempts by general Saluva Narasimha Deva Raya in 1485 and by general Tuluva Narasa Nayaka in 1491 to reconsolidate the empire.

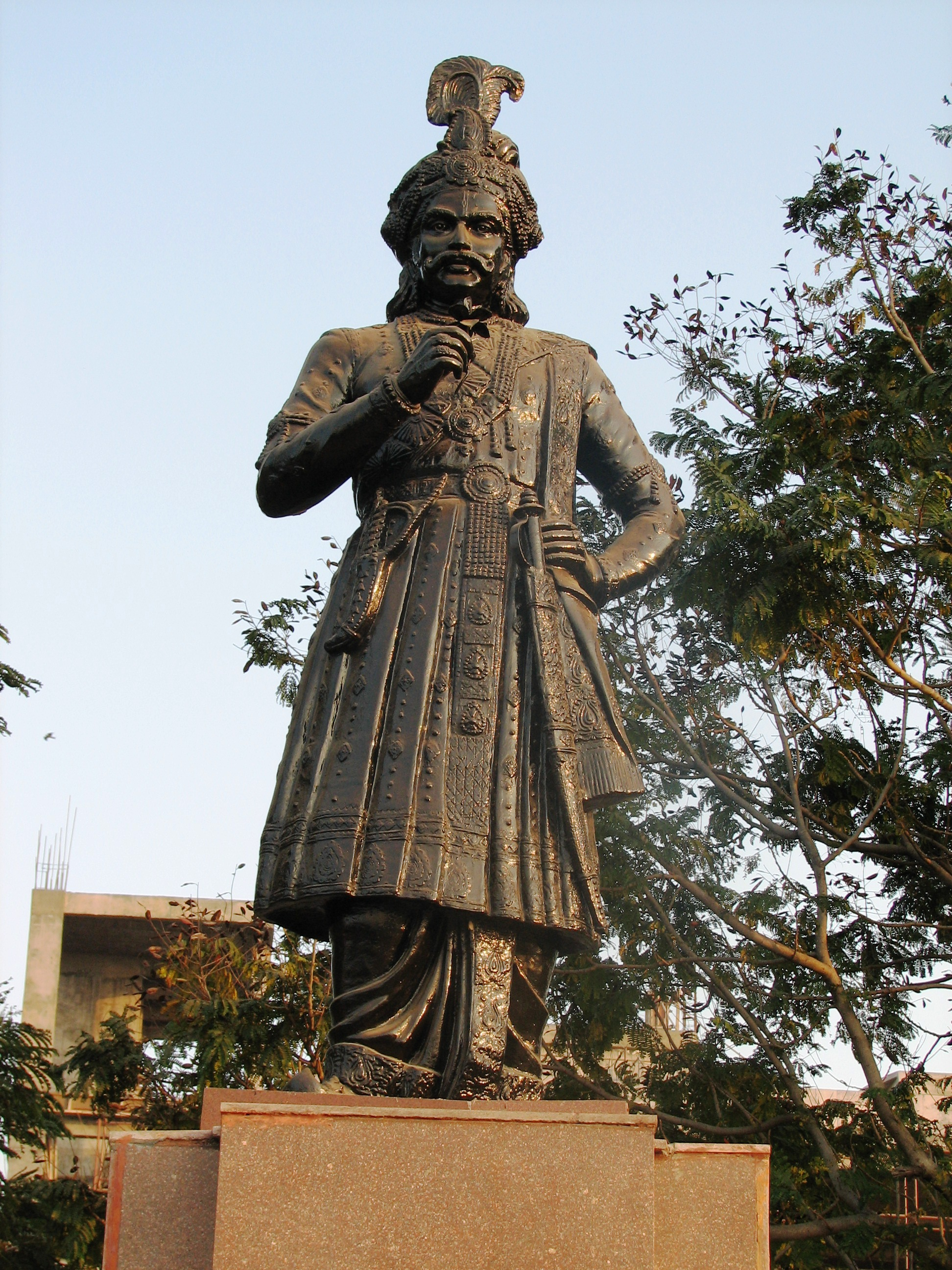
Krishna Deva Raya

After nearly two decades of conflict with rebellious chieftains, the empire eventually came under the rule of Krishna Deva Raya, the son of Tuluva Narasa Nayaka. In the following decades the Vijayanagara empire dominated all of southern India and fought off invasions from the five established Deccan Sultanates. The empire reached its peak during the reign of Krishna Deva Raya when Vijayanagara armies were consistently victorious. The empire annexed areas formerly under the Sultanates in the northern Deccan and the territories in the eastern Deccan, including Kalinga, while simultaneously maintaining control over all its subordinates in the south. Many important monuments were either completed or commissioned during the reign of Krishna Deva Raya.

Krishna Deva Raya was succeeded by his younger brother Achyuta Deva Raya in 1529 and in 1542 by Sadashiva Raya while the real power lay with Aliya Rama Raya, the son-in-law of Krishna Deva Raya, whose relationship with the Deccan Sultans who allied against him has been debated.

The sudden capture and beheading of Aliya Rama Raya in 1565 at the Battle of Talikota by his own Muslim generals, against an alliance of the Deccan sultanates, after a seemingly easy victory for the Vijayanagara armies, created havoc and confusion in the Vijayanagara ranks, which were then completely routed. The Sultanates' army later plundered Hampi, razed and reduced the imperial capital to the ruinous state in which it remains; it was never re-occupied. Tirumala Deva Raya, Rama Raya's younger brother who was the sole surviving commander, left Vijayanagara for Penukonda with vast amounts of treasure on the back of 1500 elephants.

The empire went into a slow decline regionally, although trade with the Portuguese continued, and the British were given a land grant for the establishment of Madras. Tirumala Deva Raya was succeeded by his son Sriranga I later followed by Venkata II who was the last monarch of Vijayanagara empire, made his capital Chandragiri and Vellore, repulsed more invasions from the Deccan Sultanates and saved Penukonda from being captured.

His successor Rama Deva Raya took power and ruled until 1632, after whose death Venkata III became monarch and ruled for about ten years. The empire was finally conquered by the Sultanates of Bijapur and Golkonda. The largest feudatories of the Vijayanagara empire – the Nayaks of Gandikota, the Mysore Kingdom, Keladi Nayaka, Nayaks of Madurai, Nayaks of Tanjore, Nayakas of Chitradurga and Nayak Kingdom of Gingee palegars of gummanayakanapalya – declared independence and went on to have a significant impact on the history of southern India in the coming centuries. These Nayaka kingdoms lasted into the 18th century while the Mysore Kingdom remained a princely state until Indian Independence in 1947 although they came under the British Raj in 1799 after the death of Tipu Sultan.

=== Kingdom of Kozhikode ===
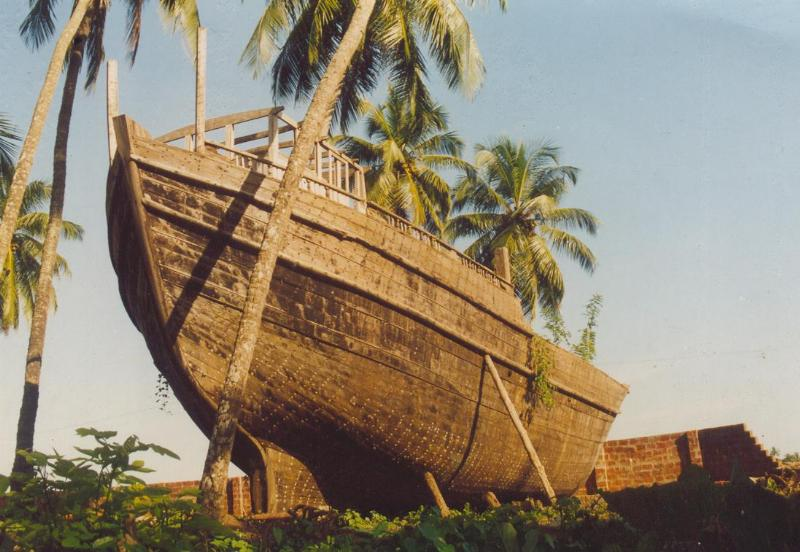
Uru, a type of ship that was historically used for maritime trade, built at Beypore, Kozhikode

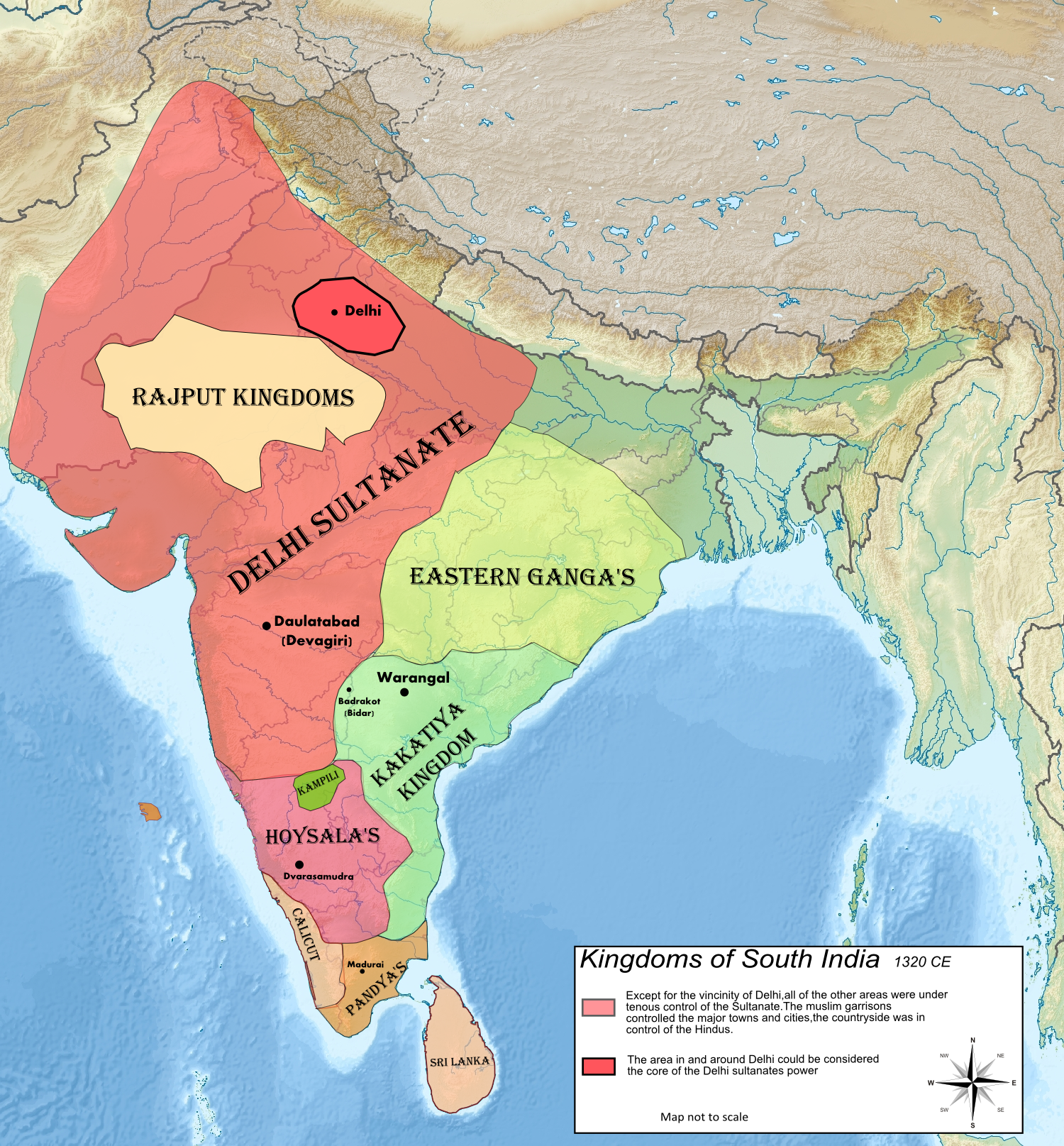
A political map of India in 1320 CE. Note that most of the present-day state of Kerala had been under the sovereignty of the Zamorin of Calicut.

Historical records regarding the origin of the Samoothiri of Kozhikode is obscure. However, its generally agreed that the Samoothiri were originally the Nair chieftains of Eralnadu region of the Later Chera Kingdom and were known as the Eradis. Eralnadu (Eranad) province was situated in the northern parts of present-day Malappuram district and was landlocked by the Valluvanad and Polanadu in the west. Legends such as Keralolpathi tell the establishment of a local ruling family at Nediyiruppu, near present-day Kondotty by two young brothers belonging to the Eradi clan. The brothers, Manikkan and Vikraman were the most trusted generals in the army of the Cheras. M.G.S. Narayanan, a Kerala-based historian, in his book, Calicut: The City of Truth states that the Eradi was a favourite of the last Later Chera king and granted him, as a mark of favor, a small tract of land on the sea-coast in addition to his hereditary possessions (Eralnadu province). Eradis subsequently moved their capital to the coastal marshy lands and established the kingdom of Kozhikode. They later assumed the title of Samudrāthiri ("one who has the sea for his border") and continued to rule from Kozhikode.

Samoothiri allied with Muslim Arab and Chinese merchants and used most of the wealth from Kozhikode to develop his military power. They became the most powerful king in the Malayalam speaking regions during the Middle Ages. In the 14th century, Kozhikode conquered large parts of central Kerala following the seize of Tirunavaya from Valluvanad, which was under the control of the king of Perumbadappu Swaroopam. He was forced to shift his capital (c. CE 1405) further south from Kodungallur to Kochi. In the 15th century, Cochin was reduced in to a vassal state of Kozhikode. The ruler of Kolathunadu (Kannur) had also came under the influence of Zamorin by the end of the 15th century.

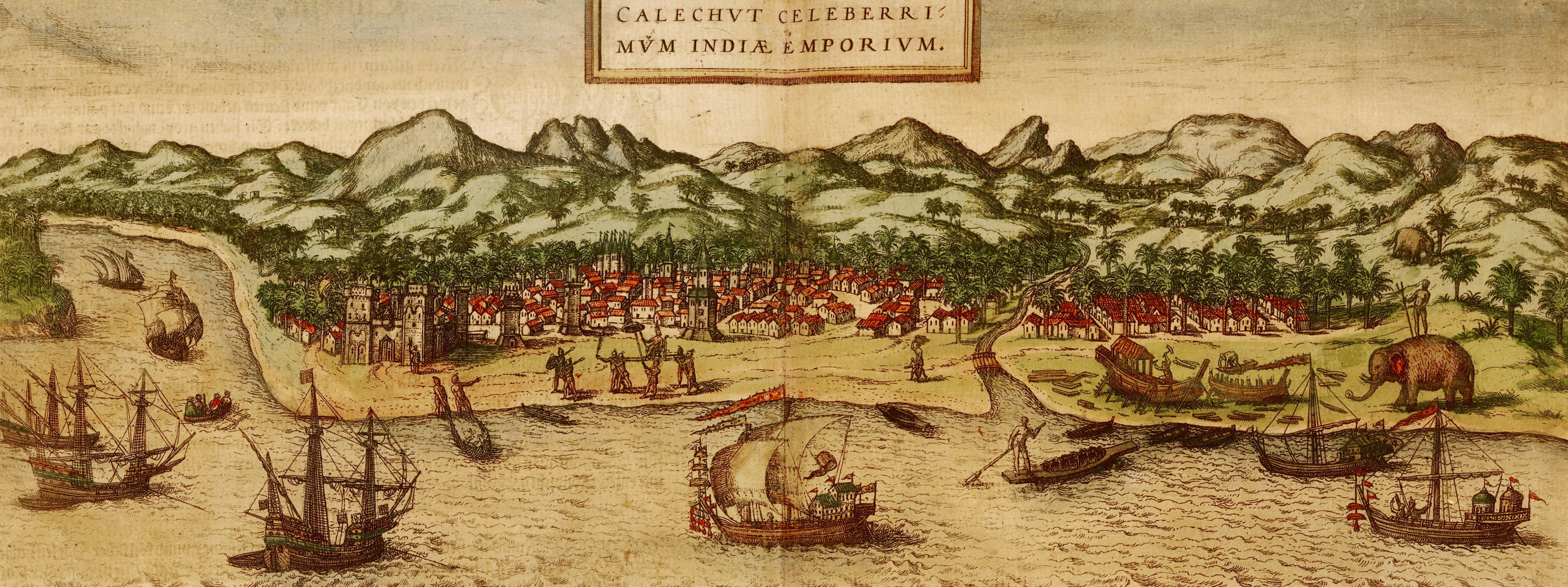
A panorama of port Kozhikode, shows several types of ships, shipbuilding, net fishing, dinghy traffic and a rugged, sparsely populated interior (Georg Braun and Frans Hogenberg's atlas Civitates orbis terrarum, 1572)

At the peak of their reign, the Zamorins of Kozhikode ruled over a region from Kollam (Quilon) in the south to Panthalayini Kollam (Koyilandy) in the north. Ibn Battuta (1342–1347), who visited the city of Kozhikode six times, gives the earliest glimpses of life in the city. He describes Kozhikode as "one of the great ports of the district of Malabar" where "merchants of all parts of the world are found". The king of this place, he says, "shaves his chin just as the Haidari Fakeers of Rome do... The greater part of the Muslim merchants of this place are so wealthy that one of them can purchase the whole freightage of such vessels put here and fit-out others like them". Ma Huan (1403 AD), the Chinese sailor part of the Imperial Chinese fleet under Cheng Ho (Zheng He) states the city as a great emporium of trade frequented by merchants from around the world. He makes note of the 20 or 30 mosques built to cater to the religious needs of the Muslims, the unique system of calculation by the merchants using their fingers and toes (followed to this day), and the matrilineal system of succession. Abdur Razzak (1442–43), Niccolò de' Conti (1445), Afanasy Nikitin (1468–74), Ludovico di Varthema (1503–1508), and Duarte Barbosa witnessed the city as one of the major trading centres in the Indian subcontinent where traders from different parts of the world could be seen.

The emperor Deva Raya II (r. 1424 – 1446) of the Vijayanagara Empire conquered about the whole of present-day state of Kerala in the 15th century. He defeated the Zamorin of Kozhikode, as well as the ruler of Kollam around 1443. Fernão Nunes says that the Zamorin had to pay tribute to the king of Vijayanagara Empire. Later Kozhikode and Venad seem to have rebelled against their Vijayanagara overlords, but Deva Raya II quelled the rebellion. As the Vijayanagara power diminished over the next fifty years, the Zamorin of Kozhikode again rose to prominence in Kerala. He built a fort at Ponnani in 1498.

=== Kingdom of Venad ===
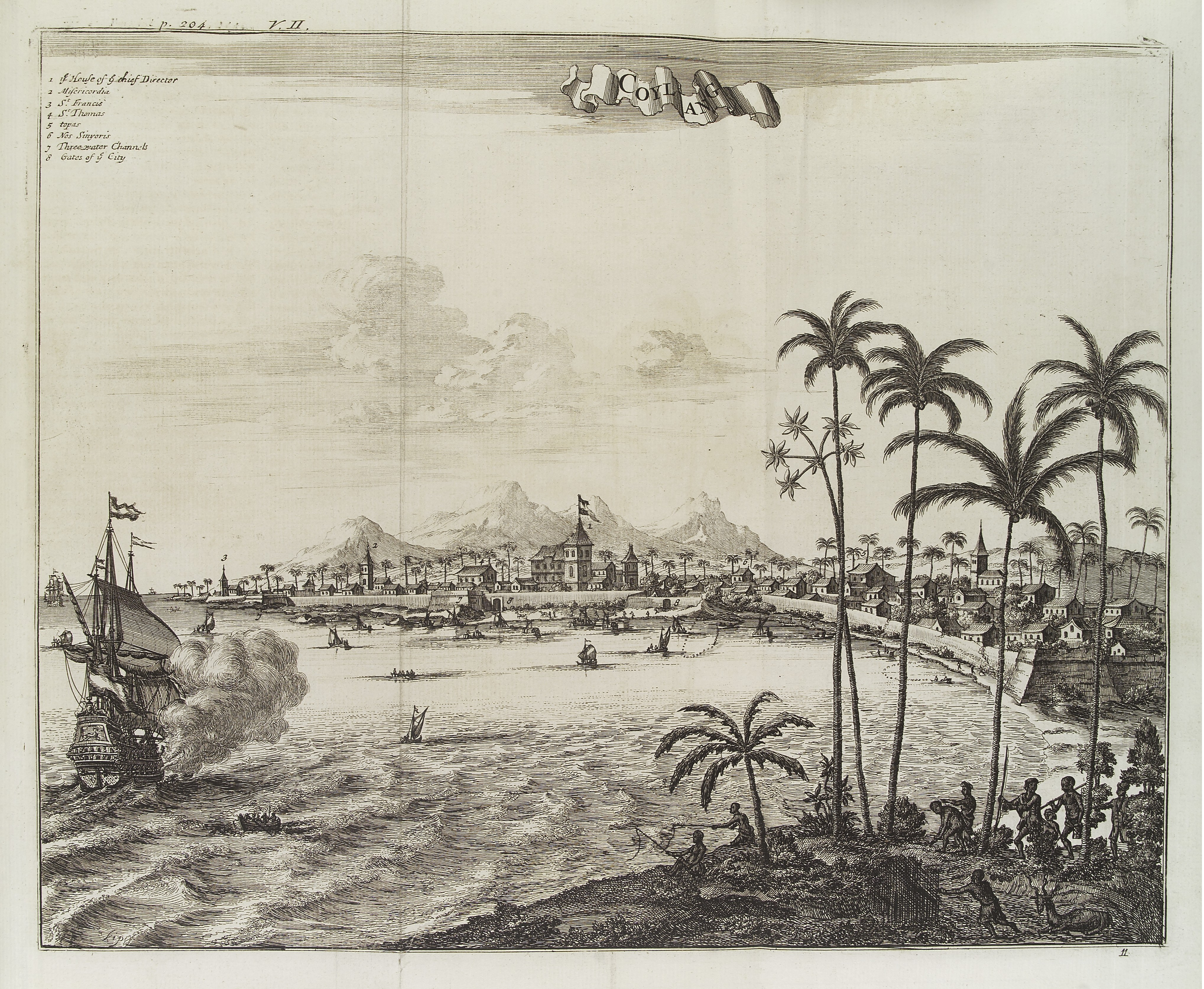
Kollam, the capital of Venad, in 1700s

Venad was a kingdom in the south west tip of Kerala, which acted as a buffer between Cheras and Pandyas. Until the end of the 11th century, it was a small principality in the Ay Kingdom. The Ays were the earliest ruling dynasty in southern Kerala, who, at their zenith, ruled over a region from Nagercoil in the south to Thiruvananthapuram in the north. Their capital was at Kollam. A series of attacks by the Pandyas between the 7th and 8th centuries caused the decline of Ays although the dynasty remained powerful until the beginning of the 10th century. When Ay power diminished, Venad became the southernmost principality of the Second Chera Kingdom Invasion of Cholas into Venad caused the destruction of Kollam in 1096. However, the Chera capital, Mahodayapuram, fell in the subsequent attack, which compelled the Chera king, Rama varma Kulasekara, to shift his capital to Kollam. Thus, Rama Varma Kulasekara, the last king of Chera dynasty, is probably the founder of the Venad royal house, and the title of Chera kings, Kulasekara, was thenceforth adopted by the rulers of Venad. The end of Second Chera dynasty in the 12th century marks the independence of the Venad. The Venadu King then also was known as Venadu Mooppil Nayar.

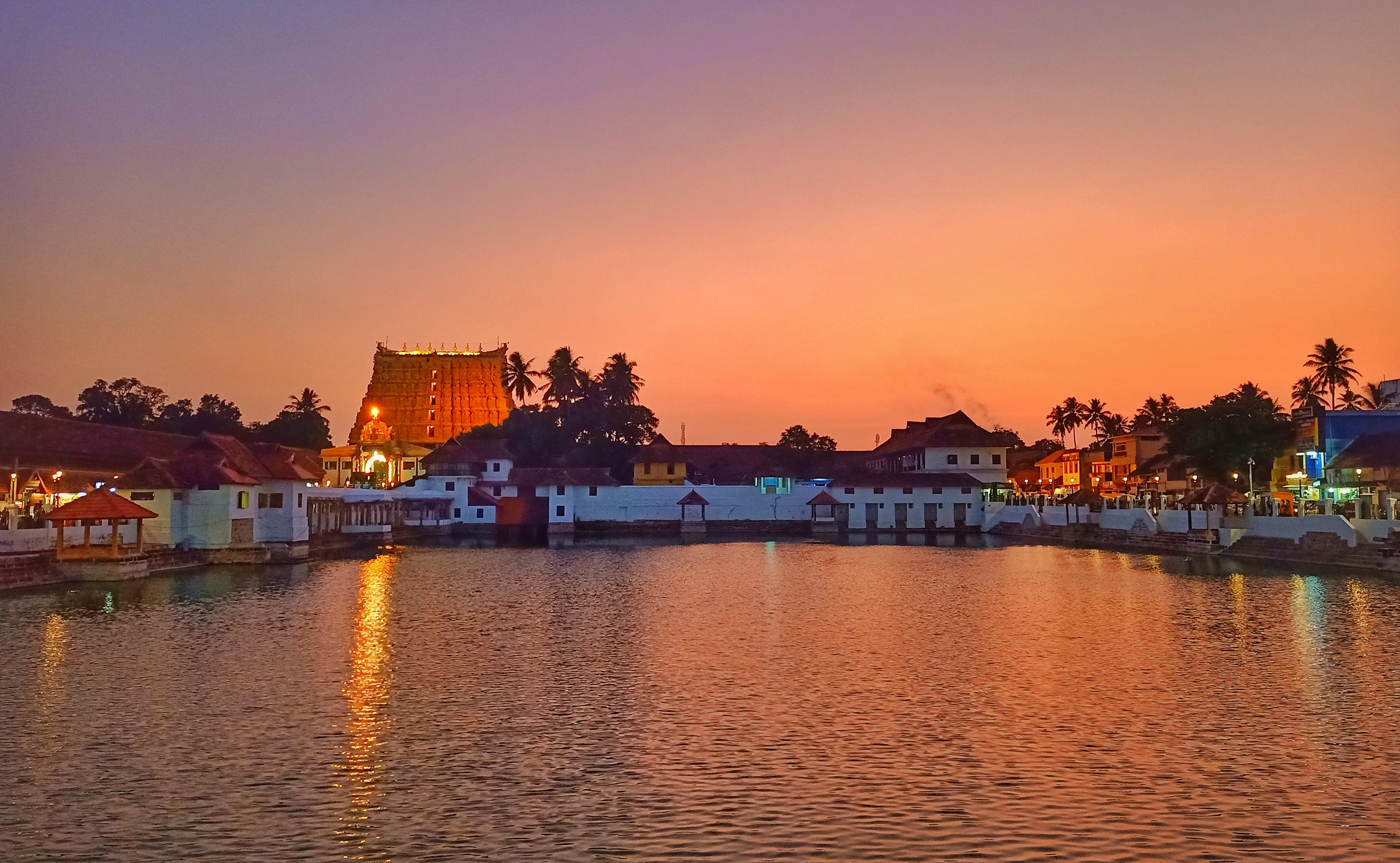
Sree Padmanabha Swamy at Thiruvananthapuram was the largest temple in Venad, which was eventually expanded into the Malayalam kingdom of Travancore in modern period.

In the second half of the 12th century, two branches of the Ay dynasty: Thrippappur and Chirava, merged into the Venad family and established the tradition of designating the ruler of Venad as Chirava Moopan and the heir-apparent as Thrippappur Moopan. While Chrirava Moopan had his residence at Kollam, the Thrippappur Moopan resided at his palace in Thrippappur, 9 miles (14 km) north of Thiruvananthapuram, and was vested with the authority over the temples of Venad kingdom, especially the Sri Padmanabhaswamy temple. The most powerful kingdom of Kerala during the colonial period, Travancore, was developed through the expansion of Venad by Mahahrajah Marthanda Varma, a member of the Thrippappur branch of the Ay dynasty who ascended to the throne in the 18th century.

=== Portuguese discovery of the sea route to India ===
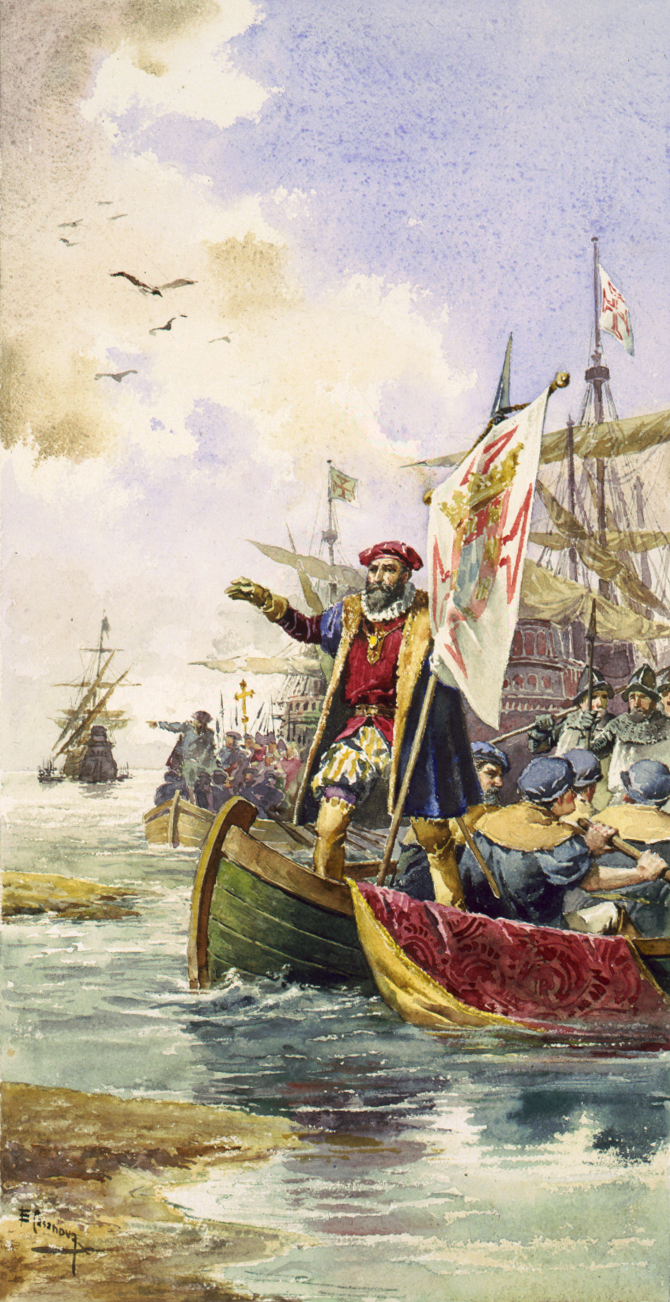
Vasco da Gama landing near Kozhikode in Kerala

The maritime spice trade monopoly in the Indian Ocean stayed with the Arabs during the High and Late Middle Ages. However, the dominance of Middle East traders was challenged in the European Age of Discovery. After Vasco Da Gama's arrival in Kappad Kozhikode in 1498, the Portuguese began to dominate eastern shipping, and the spice-trade in particular. Following the discovery of sea route from Europe to Malabar in 1498, the Portuguese began to expand their territories and ruled the seas between Ormus and the Malabar Coast and south to Ceylon.

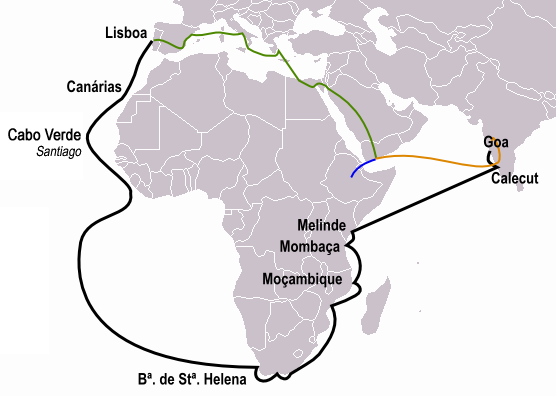
The path Vasco da Gama took to reach Kozhikode (black line)

Vasco da Gama was sent by the King of Portugal Dom Manuel I and landed at Kozhikode in 1497–1499. The Samoothiri Maharaja of Kozhikode permitted the Portuguese to trade with his subjects. Their trade in Kozhikode prospered with the establishment of a factory and fort in his territory. However, Portuguese attacks on Arab properties in his jurisdiction provoked the Samoothiri and finally led to conflict.

The Portuguese took advantage of the rivalry between the Samoothiri and Rajah of Kochi – they allied with Kochi and when Francisco de Almeida was appointed Viceroy of Portuguese India in 1505, he established his headquarters at Kochi. During his reign, the Portuguese managed to dominate relations with Kochi and established a number of fortresses along the Malabar Coast. Nonetheless, the Portuguese suffered severe setbacks due to attacks by Samoothiri Maharaja's forces, especially naval attacks under the leadership of admirals of Kozhikode known as Kunjali Marakkars, which compelled them to seek a treaty. The Kunjali Marakkars are credited with organizing the first naval defense of the Indian coast.

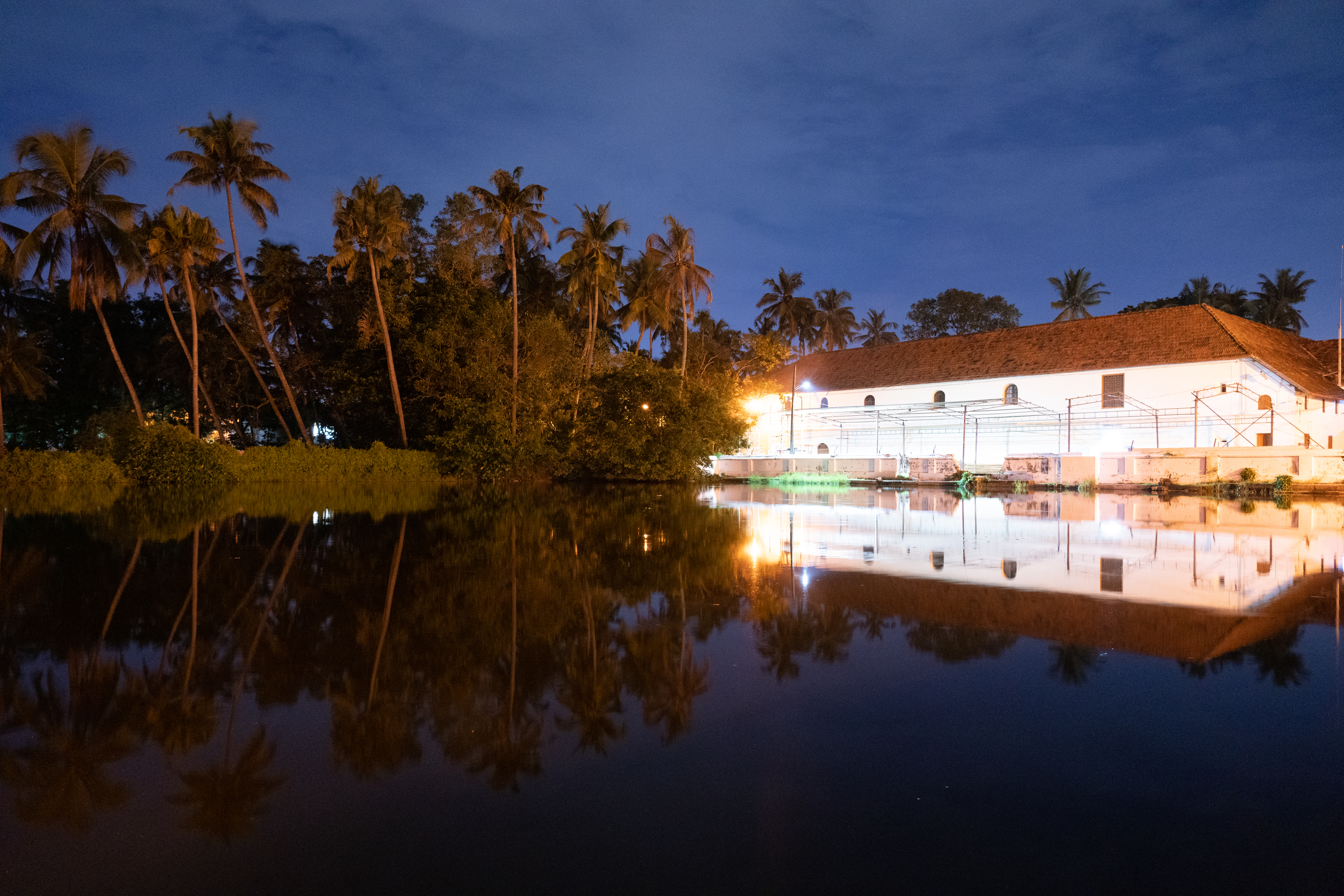
The Mattancherry Palace at Kochi was built and gifted by the Portuguese as a present to the Kingdom of Cochin around 1545

The Portuguese influence got weakened in Kerala when the Zamorin defeated them with the help of Dutch East India Company in the early 17th century. In 1664, the municipality of Fort Kochi was established by Dutch Malabar, making it the first municipality in the Indian subcontinent, which got dissolved when the Dutch authority got weaker in the 18th century. The Dutch Malabar (1661–1795) in turn were weakened by their constant battles with Marthanda Varma of the Travancore royal family, and were defeated at the Battle of Colachel in 1741, resulting in the complete eclipse of Dutch power in Malabar. The Treaty of Mavelikkara was signed by the Dutch and Travancore in 1753, according to which the Dutch were compelled to detach from all political involvements in the region.

In the meantime, Marthanda Varma annexed many smaller northern kingdoms through military conquests, resulting in the rise of Travancore to a position of preeminence in Kerala. Travancore became the most dominant state in Kerala by defeating the powerful Zamorin of Kozhikode in the Battle of Purakkad in 1763. The region of Mahé came under French control by the 18th century CE.

=== Nayak kingdoms ===
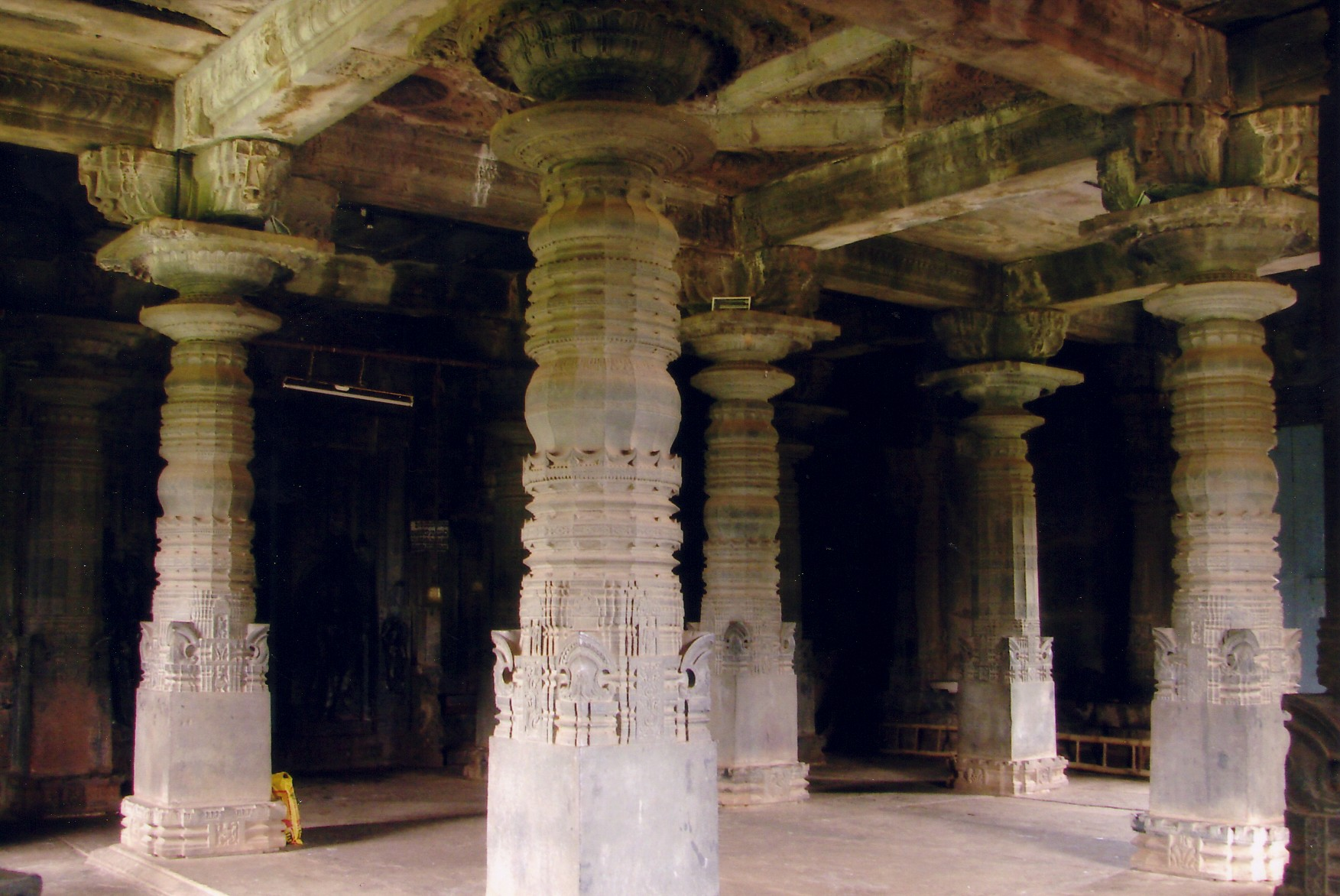
Aghoreshwara temple, mantapa in Keladi Nayaka art Shimoga District, Karnataka.

Vijayangara empire had established military and administrative governors called Nayakas to rule in the various territories of the empire. After the demise of the Vijayanagara empire, the local governors declared their independence and started their rule. The Nayak of Madurai, Nayaks of Tanjore, Keladi Nayakas of Shimoga, Nayakas of Chitradurga and Kingdom of Mysore were the most prominent of them. Raghunatha Nayak (1600–1645) was the greatest of the Tanjavur Nayaks. Raghunatha Nayak encouraged trade and permitted a Danish settlement in 1620 at Danesborg at Tarangambadi. This laid the foundation of future European involvement in the affairs of the country. The success of the Dutch inspired the English to seek trade with Thanjavur, which was to lead to far-reaching repercussions. Vijaya Raghava (1631–1675 CE) was the last of the Thanjavur Nayaks. Nayaks reconstructed some of the oldest temples in the country and their contributions can be seen even today. Nayaks expanded the existing temples with large pillared halls, and tall gateway towers was a striking feature in the religious architecture of this period. Kantheerava Narasaraja Wodeyar and Tipu Sultan from the Kingdom of Mysore, Madhakari Nayaka of Chitradurga Nayaka clan and Venkatappa Nayaka of Keladi dynasty are the most famous among the post Vijayanagara rulers from Kannada country.

In Madurai, Thirumalai Nayak was the most famous Nayak ruler. He patronised art and architecture creating new structures and expanding the existing landmarks in and around Madurai. His landmark buildings are the Meenakshi Temple Gopurams and Thirumalai Nayak Palace in Madurai. On Thirumalai Nayak's death in 1659 CE, other notable ruler was Rani Mangammal. Shivaji Bhonsle, the great Maratha Ruler, invaded the south, as did Chikka Deva Raya of Mysore and other Muslim Rulers, resulting in chaos and instability and the Madurai Nayak Kingdom collapsed in 1736 following internal strife.

The Tanjavur Nayaks ruled till the late 17th century until their dynasty was put to an end by Madurai Rulers, and the Marathas grabbing the opportunity to install their ruler. The Tanjavur Nayak kings were notable for their contribution to Arts and Telugu literature.

=== Maratha Empire ===
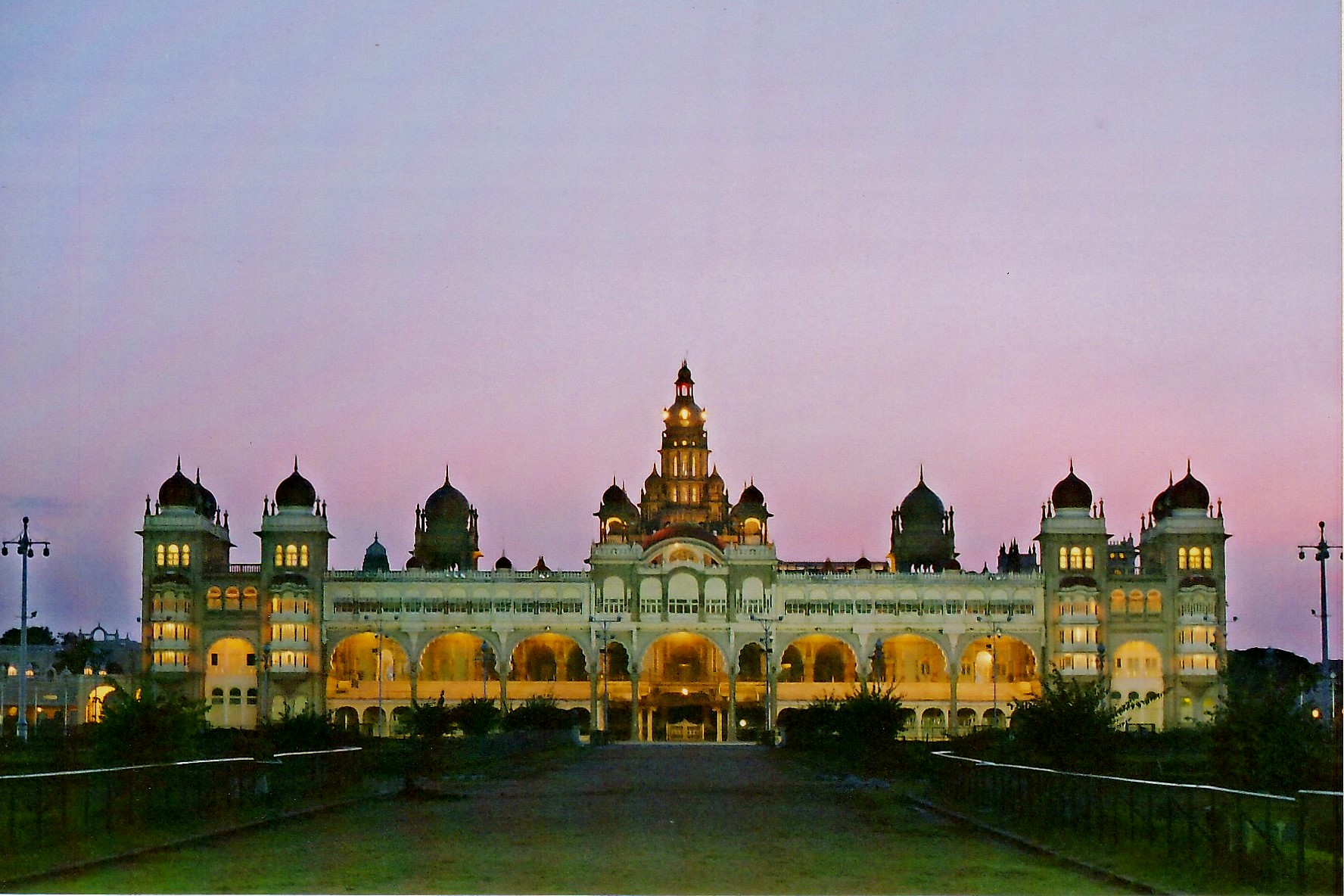
Mysore Palace in Mysore, Karnataka.

The Maratha Empire or the Maratha Confederacy was an Indian imperial power that existed from 1674 to 1818. At its peak, the empire covered much of the subcontinent, encompassing a territory of over 2.8 million km^{2}.

The Marathas were a yeoman Hindu warrior group from the western Deccan (present day Maharashtra) that rose to prominence by establishing 'Hindawi Swarajya'. According to the Encyclopædia Britannica: The Maratha group of castes is a largely rural class of peasant cultivators, landowners, and soldiers. The Marathas became prominent in the 17th century under the leadership of Shivaji Bhosale who revolted against the Bijapur Sultanate, and carved out a rebel territory with Raigad as his stronghold. Known for their mobility, the Marathas were able to consolidate their territory during the Deccan Wars against the Mughal emperor Aurangzeb and, later in time, controlled a large part of India.

Shahu, a grandson of Chhatrapati Shivaji, was released by the Mughals after the death of Aurangzeb. Following a brief struggle with his aunt Tarabai, Shahu became ruler. During this period, he appointed Balaji Vishwanath Bhat and later his descendants as the Deshasth Peshwas (Warriors) or the prime ministers of the Maratha Empire. After the death of the Mughal Emperor Aurangzeb, the empire expanded greatly under the rule of the Peshwas. The empire at its peak stretched from Tamil Nadu in the south Tanjavur of Tamil Nadu, to Peshawar(modern-day Khyber Pakhtunkhwa) in the north, and Bengal and Andaman Islands in east. The rise of Maratha military power under Chatrapathi Shivaji and his heirs in the immediate north of what is today considered South India had a profound influence on the political situation of South India, with Maratha control quickly extending as far east as Ganjam and as far south as Thanjavur. Following the death of Aurangzeb, Mughal power withered, and South Indian rulers gained autonomy from Delhi. The Wodeyar kingdom of Mysore, which was originally in tribute to Vijayanagara and gained in strength over the next few decades, subsequently emerging as the dominant power in the southern part of South India. The Asaf Jahis of Hyderabad controlled the territory north and east of Mysore, while the Marathas controlled portions of Karnataka. By the close of the "medieval" period, most of South India was either autonomy under Maratha ruled directly from, or under tribute to the Nayak dynasty or Wodeyars.

=== Kingdom of Mysore (Mysuru) ===
The Kingdom of Mysore was a realm in southern India, traditionally believed to have been founded in 1399 in the vicinity of the modern city of Mysore. From 1799 until 1950, it was a princely state, until 1947 in a subsidiary alliance with British India. It then became Mysore State (later enlarged and renamed to Karnataka) with its ruler remaining as Rajapramukh until 1956, when he became the first Governor of the reformed state.

The kingdom, which was founded and ruled for most part by the Hindu Wodeyar family, initially served as a vassal state of the Vijayanagara Empire. The 17th century saw a steady expansion of its territory and during the rule of Narasaraja Wodeyar I and Chikka Devaraja Wodeyar, the kingdom annexed large expanses of what is now southern Karnataka and parts of Tamil Nadu to become a powerful state in the southern Deccan. During a brief Muslim rule, the kingdom shifted to a Sultanate style of administration.

During this time, it came into conflict with the Marathas, the Nizam of Hyderabad, the Kingdom of Travancore and the British, which culminated in the four Anglo-Mysore Wars. Success in the first Anglo-Mysore war and a stalemate in the second was followed by defeat in the third and the fourth. Following Tipu's death in the fourth war in the siege of Seringapatam (1799), large parts of his kingdom were annexed by the British, which signalled the end of a period of Mysorean hegemony over South India. The British restored the Wodeyars to their throne by way of a subsidiary alliance and the diminished Mysore was transformed into a princely state. The Wodeyars continued to rule the state until Indian independence in 1947, when Mysore acceded to the Union of India.

Even as a princely state, Mysore came to be counted among the more developed and urbanised regions of India. This period (1799–1947) also saw Mysore emerge as one of the important centres of art and culture in India. The Mysore kings were not only accomplished exponents of the fine arts and men of letters, they were enthusiastic patrons as well, and their legacies continue to influence rocket science, music, and art even today.

== Modern history ==
=== Colonial period ===
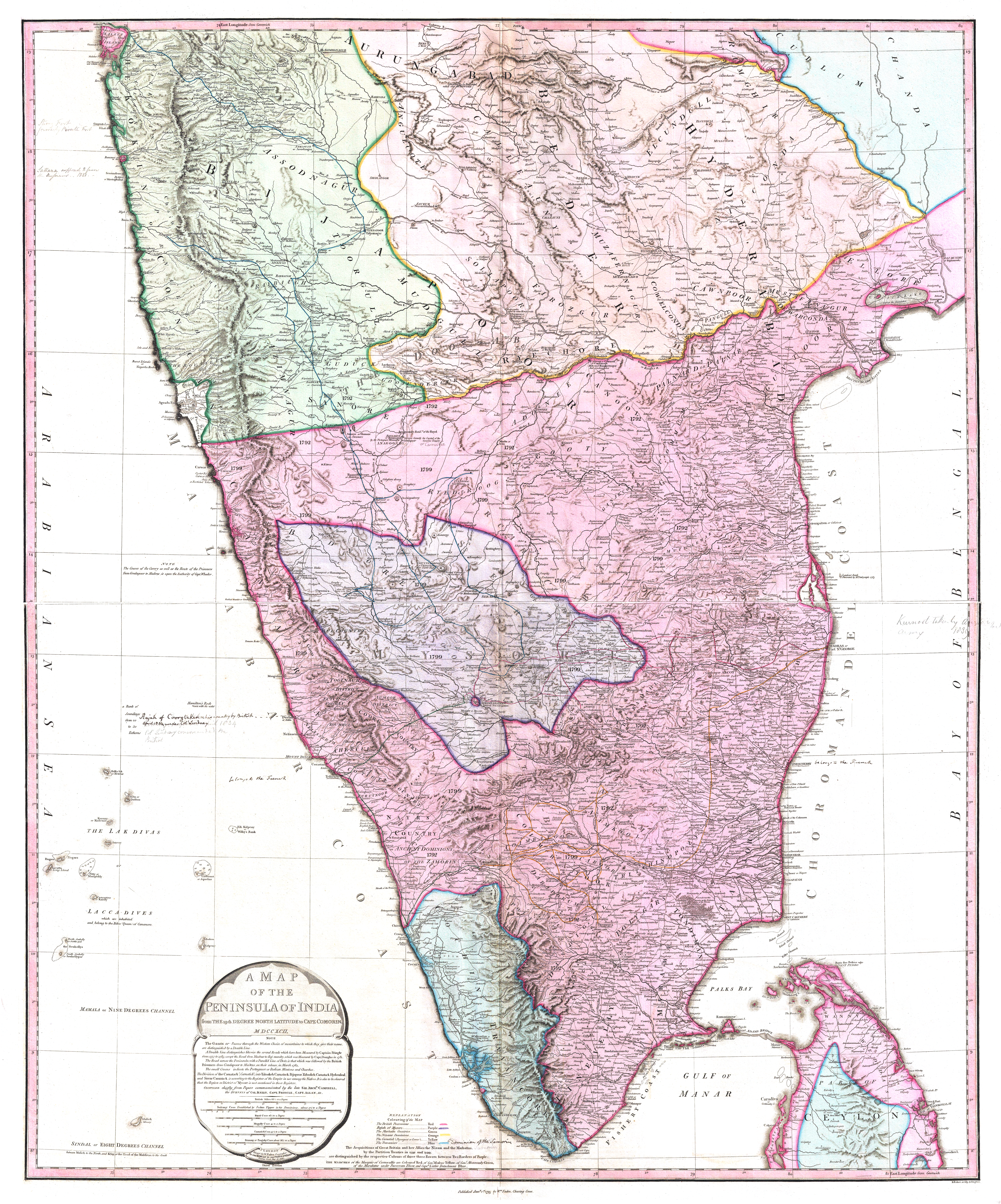
South India in 1800

In the middle of the 18th century, the French and the British East India company initiated a protracted struggle for military control of South India. The period was marked by shifting alliances between the two East India companies and the local powers, mercenary armies employed by all sides, and general anarchy in South India. Cities and forts changed hands many times, and soldiers were primarily remunerated through loot. The four Anglo-Mysore Wars and the three Anglo-Maratha Wars saw Mysore, the Marathas and Hyderabad aligning themselves in turns with either the British or the French. Eventually, British power in alliance with Hyderabad prevailed and Mysore was absorbed as a princely state within British India. The Nizam of Hyderabad sought to retain his autonomy through diplomacy rather than open war with the British. The Maratha Empire that stretched across large swathes of central and northern India was broken up, with most of it annexed by the British.

=== British South India ===
South India during the British colonial rule was divided into the Madras Presidency and Hyderabad, Mysore, Thiruvithamcoore (also known as Travancore), Cochin, Vizianagaram and a number of other minor princely states. The Madras Presidency was ruled directly by the British, while the rulers of the princely states enjoyed considerable internal autonomy. British Residents were stationed in the capitals of the important states to supervise and report on the activities of the rulers. British troops were stationed in cantonments near the capitals to prevent rebellion. The rulers of these states accepted the principle of paramountcy of the British Crown. The larger princely states issued their own currency and built their own railroads—with non-standard gauges which would be incompatible with their neighbors. The cultivation of coffee and tea was introduced to the mountainous regions of South India during the British period, and both remain important cash crops.

=== After independence ===
On 15 August 1947, the former British India achieved independence as the new dominions of India and Pakistan. The rulers of India's princely states acceded to the government of India between 1947 and 1950, and South India was organized into a number of new states. Most of South India was included in Madras state, which included the territory of the former Madras Presidency together with the princely states of Banganapalle, Pudukkottai, and Sandur. The other states in South India were Coorg (the erstwhile Coorg province of British India), Mysore State (the former princely state of Mysore) and Travancore-Cochin, formed from the merger of the princely states of Travancore and Cochin. The former princely state of Hyderabad became Hyderabad State, and erstwhile Bombay Presidency became Bombay State.

In 1953, the Jawaharlal Nehru government yielded to intense pressure from the northern Telugu-speaking districts of Madras State, and allowed them to vote to create India's first linguistic state. Andhra State was created on 1 November 1953 from the northern districts of Madras State, with its capital in Kurnool. Increasing demands for reorganisation of the patchwork of India's states resulted in the formation of a national States Reorganisation Commission. Based on the commission's recommendations, the Parliament of India enacted the States Reorganisation Act of 1956, which reorganized the boundaries of India's states along linguistic lines. Andhra State was renamed Andhra Pradesh, and enlarged by the addition of Telugu-speaking region of Telangana, formerly part of Hyderabad State. Mysore State was enlarged by the addition of Coorg and the Kannada-speaking districts of southwestern Hyderabad State and southern Bombay State. The new Malayalam-speaking state of Kerala was created by the merger of Travancore-Cochin with Malabar and Kasargod districts of Madras State. Madras State, which after 1956 included the Tamil-majority regions of South India, changed its name to Tamil Nadu in 1968, and Mysore State was renamed Karnataka in 1972. Portuguese India, which included Goa, was annexed by India in 1961, and Goa became a state in 1987. The enclaves of French India were ceded to India in the 1950s, and the southern four were organised into the union territory of Puducherry.

== See also ==
- South India
- History of India
- Nayaka dynasties
- List of Tamil monarchs
- Hinduism in South India
- History of Maurya

History by states

- Tamil Nadu, Kerala, Karnataka, Andhra Pradesh, Telangana.
