= Vijayanagara Empire =

Karnata Empire in southern India (1336–1646)

- 1336–1646
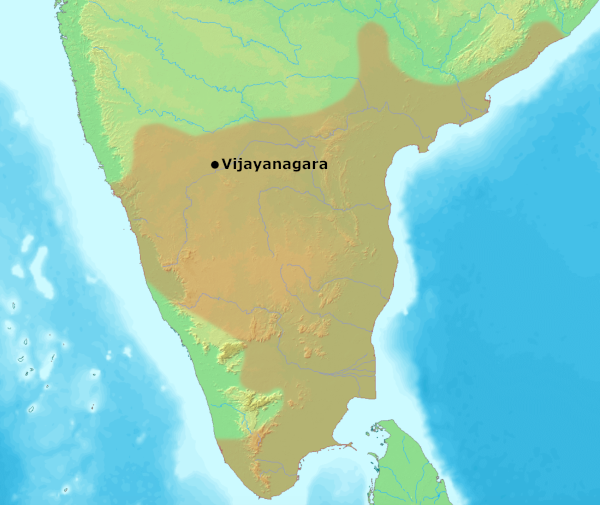
- The Vijayanagara Empire in 1485, tributaries not shown
- Capital: Vijayanagara (1336–1565); Penukonda (1565–1592); Chandragiri (1592–1604); Vellore (1604–1646)
- Common languages: Kannada; Sanskrit; Tamil; Telugu
- Religion: Hinduism
- Government: Monarchy
- Emperor
  - 1336–1356: Harihara I (first)
  - 1356–1377: Bukka Raya I
  - 1423–1446: Deva Raya II
  - 1485–1491: Saluva Narasimha Deva
  - 1509–1529: Krishnadevaraya
  - 1529–1542: Achyuta Deva Raya
  - 1642–1646: Sriranga III (last)
- History
  - Established: 18 April 1336
  - Earliest records: 1343
  - Battle of Talikota: 23 January 1565
  - Disestablished: 1646

Area
- 1500 est.: 880,000 km^{2} (340,000 sq mi)

Population
  - 1500 estimate: 18,000,000
- Currency: Varaha
Succeeded by
Sultanate of Golconda
Sultanate of Bijapur
Kingdom of Mysore
- Today part of: India

The Vijayanagara Empire, (Note: /vɪˌdʒəjəˈnəɡərə/) also known as the Karnāta Empire, was a late medieval Hindu empire that ruled much of Southern India. It was established in 1336 by the brothers Harihara I and Bukka Raya I of the Sangama dynasty.

The empire rose to prominence following the disruption caused by the Delhi Sultanate incursions into the Deccan during the early 14th century. At its territorial peak under Krishnadevaraya (r. 1509–1529), it held primacy across the peninsula, pushing the Deccan sultanates north of the Tungabhadra–Krishna doab and annexing coastal Gajapati territories up to the Krishna River. At its greatest extent, its domain encompassed moddern Karnataka, Andhra Pradesh, Tamil Nadu, Goa, southern Kerala and some parts of Telangana and southern Maharashtra.

The empire survived until 1646, though its central authority diminished sharply following its defeat by allied Deccan Sultanates at the Battle of Talikota in 1565. The empire took its name from the capital city of Vijayanagara (near modern Hampi), whose extensive ruins are designated a UNESCO World Heritage Site. Chronicles by foreign visitors—including Domingo Paes, Fernão Nunes, Niccolò de' Conti, and Abdur Razzak—along with indigenous epigraphy and archeological excavations, form the primary documentary record of the empire.

Its architectural legacy is visible across India, characterized by a synthesis of earlier Chalukya, Hoysala, Pandya, and Chola forms in monumental temple complexes. They feature tall gateway towers (rajagopurams), and pillared halls (mandapas). State-sponsored irrigation canals and reservoirs supported intense agriculture and urban growth. Court patronage also stimulated literary production in Kannada, Telugu, Tamil, and Sanskrit with topics such as astronomy, mathematics, medicine, fiction, musicology, historiography and theater gaining popularity. Carnatic music developed into its classical structural framework during this era.

Vijayanagara ruins, 19th century

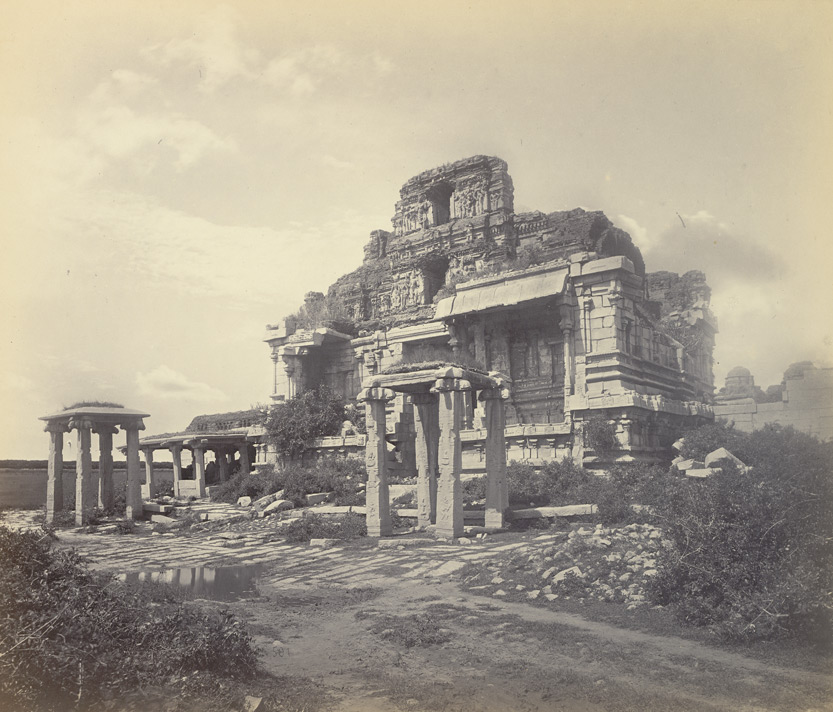
Krishna temple in 1868

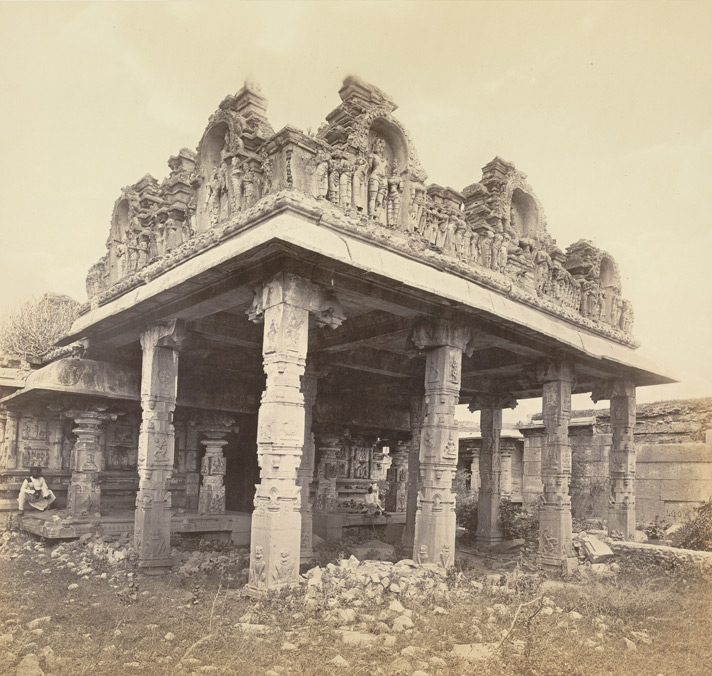
Rama temple in 1868

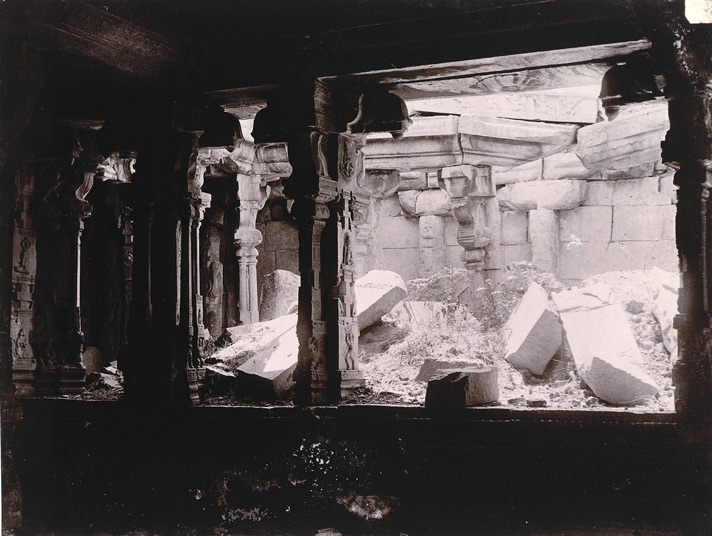
Vitthala temple in 1880

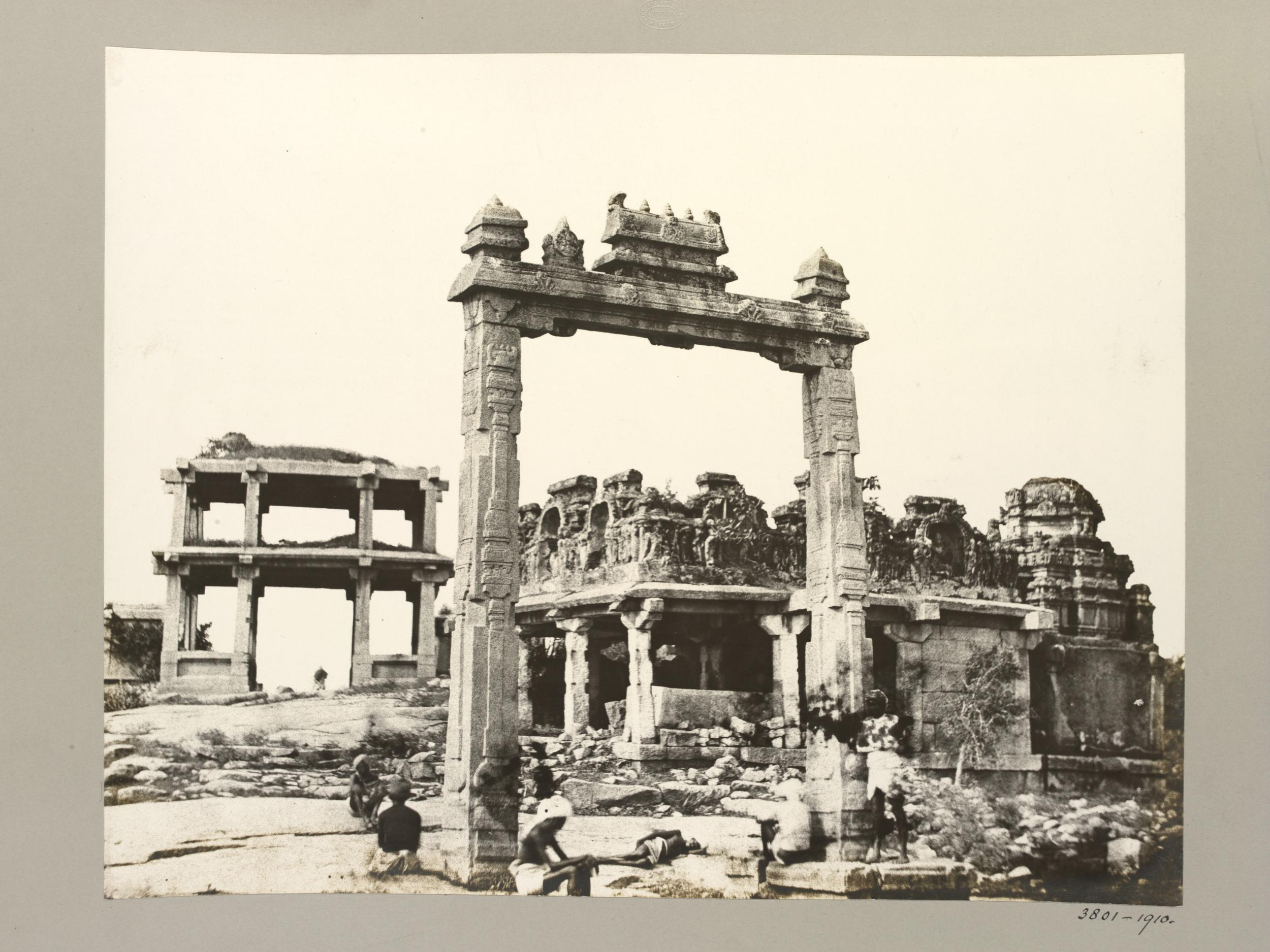
King's balance in 1858

== Name ==
'Vijayanagara' translates as 'City of Victory'. Contemporary inscriptions and literature frequently referred to the kingdom as 'Karnata Rajya' ('Karnata Kingdom'), as seen in Krishnadevaraya's Sanskrit drama Jambavati Kalyanam and Ramarajabhushana's Telugu work Vasu Charitamu. Early Portuguese and European chroniclers commonly designated the realm the "The Kingdom of Narsinga", an epithet derived from the Saluva ruler Narasimha Deva Raya or Narasimha Raya II.

== History ==
=== Background and origin theories ===
Prior to the raise of Vijayanagara, the major Hindu kingdoms of the Deccan and peninsular India—the Seunas (Yadava Empire) of Devagiri, the Kakatiya dynasty of Warangal, the Pandyan Empire of Madurai, and the Hoysalas of Belur—were subjected to repeated raids and territorial annexations by the Delhi Sultanate during the reigns of Alauddin Khalji (his general Malik Kafur) and Muhammad bin Tughluq. In the Tungabhadra basin, local commanders established the short-lived Kampili kingdom in the 1320s, which fell to Tughluq forces around 1327–1328 after its defenders performed jauhar (ritual self-immolation). The administrative and military vacuum created by the collapse of these regional polities provided the context for the establishment of Vijayanagara Kingdom in 1336.

Historians debate the regional and linguistic origins of the founders, Harihara I and Bukka I. One view posits that they were Kannada-speaking officers in the service of the Hoysala Empire stationed on its northern frontier—to defend against Muslim invasions—along the Tungabhadra. (Note: Historians such as P. B. Desai, Henry Heras, B.A. Saletore, G. S. Gai, William Coelho and Kamath in Kamath 2001, pp. 157–160) Alternative thesis holds that they were Telugu commanders initially serving the Kakatiyas of Warangal, who were captured during the Tughluq conquest. (Note: N. Ventakaramanayya; B. Suryanarayana Rao in Kamath 2001, pp. 157–160.) Later literary tradition credits the Advaita sage Vidyaranya of the Sringeri Sharada Peetham with inspiring their return to Hinduism and guiding the founding of the capital. Contemporary inscriptional evidence for Vidyaranya's direct involvement in 1336 remains limited.

=== Early years ===
In the first two decades after the founding of the empire, Harihara I gained control over most of the area south of the Tungabhadra River and earned the title of "master of the eastern and western seas" (Purvapaschima Samudradhishavara). By 1374 Bukka Raya I, successor to Harihara I, defeated the chiefdom of Arcot, the Reddys of Kondavidu, and the Sultan of Madurai, and had gained control over Goa in the west and the Tungabhadra-Krishna River doab in the north. The original capital of the empire was in the principality of Anegondi on the northern banks of the Tungabhadra River in today's Karnataka. It was moved to Vijayanagara during Bukka Raya I's reign because it was easier to defend against the Muslim armies, who were persistently attacking from the northern lands.

With the Vijayanagara Empire now imperial in stature, Harihara II, the second son of Bukka Raya I, further consolidated the empire beyond the Krishna River and South India was controlled by the Vijayanagara Empire. The next ruler, Deva Raya I, was successful against the Gajapatis of Odisha and undertook works of fortification and irrigation. (Note: From the notes of Portuguese Nuniz. Robert Sewell notes that a big dam across was built the Tungabhadra and an aqueduct 15 miles (24 km) long was cut out of rock Nilakanta Sastri 1955, p. 243.) Firuz Bahmani of Bahmani Sultanate entered into a treaty with Deva Raya I in 1407 that required the latter to pay Bahmani an annual tribute of "100,000 huns, five maunds of pearls and fifty elephants". The Sultanate invaded Vijayanagara in 1417 when the latter defaulted in paying the tribute. Such wars for tribute payment by Vijayanagara were repeated in the 15th century.

Deva Raya II (eulogized in contemporary literature as Gajabetekara) (Note: Also deciphered as Gajaventekara, a metaphor for "great hunter of his enemies", or "hunter of elephants" Kamath 2001, p. 163.) succeeded to the throne in 1424. He was possibly the most successful of the Sangama Dynasty rulers. He quelled rebelling feudal lords and the Zamorin of Calicut and Quilon in the south. He invaded Sri Lanka and became overlord of the kings of Burma at Pegu and Tanasserim. (Note: From the notes of Persian Abdur Razzak. Writings of Nuniz confirms that the kings of Burma paid tributes to Vijayanagara Empire (Nilakanta Sastri 1955, p. 245, Kamath 2001, p. 164).) By 1436 the rebellious chiefs of Kondavidu and the Velama rulers were successfully dealt with and had to accept Vijayanagara overlordship. After a few years of tranquility, wars broke out with the Bahmani Sultanate in 1443 with some successes and some reversals. The Persian visitor Firishta attributes Deva Raya II's war preparations, which included augmenting his armies with Muslim archers and cavalry, to be the cause of the conflict. Contemporary Persian ambassador Abdur Razzak attributes the war to the Bahmani Sultan capitalizing on the confusion caused by an internal revolt within the Vijayanagara Empire, including an attempt to assassinate the Raya by his brother.

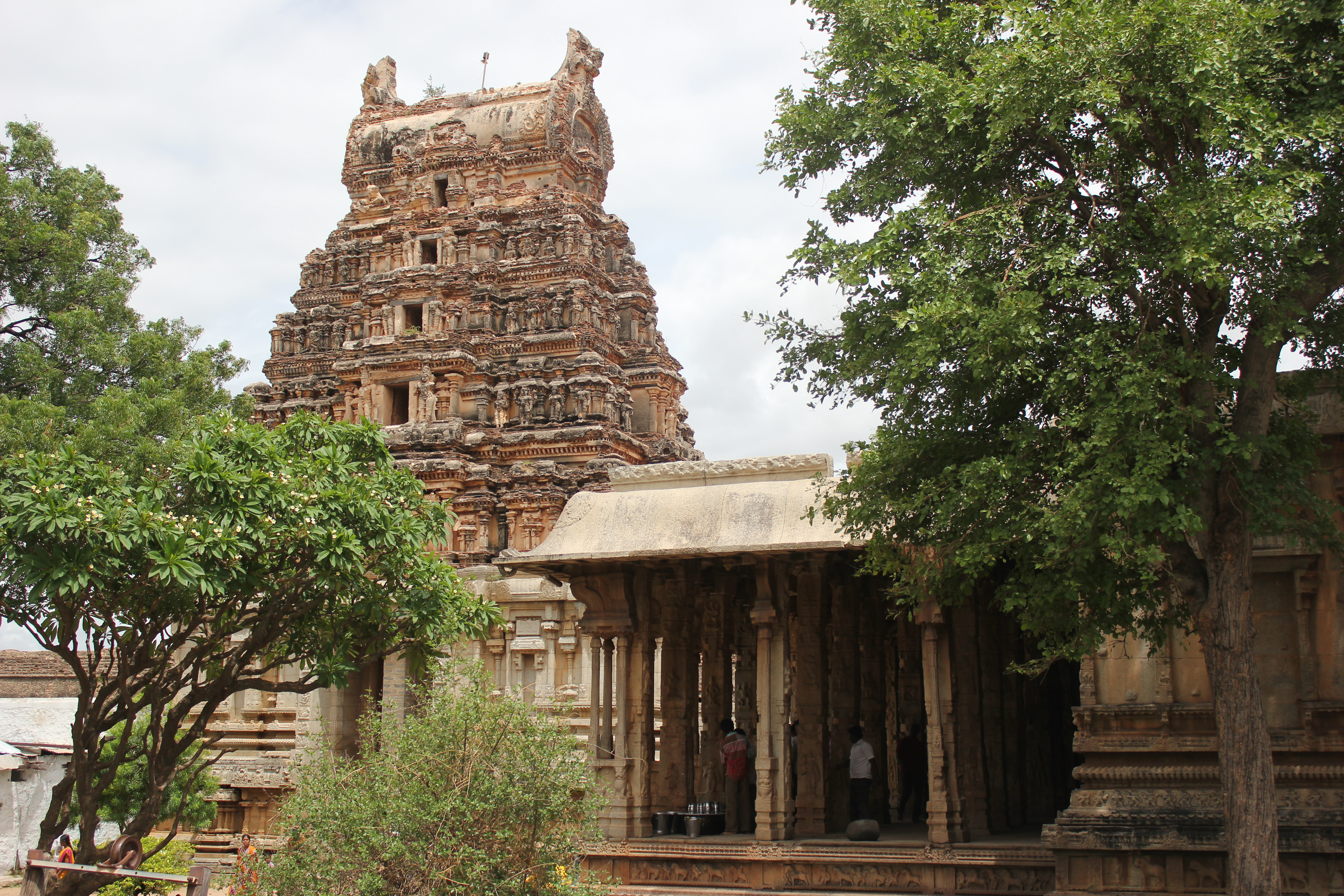
View of tower and mantapa at Ragunatha temple in Hampi

Deva Raya II was succeeded by his elder son Mallikarjuna Raya in 1446. The Gajapati emperor removed the Vijayanagara control over the Tamil country by occupying the Reddi kingdoms of Rajahmundry, Kondaveedu, Kanchipuram, and Tiruchirapalli. These defeats reduced the Vijayanagara Empire's prestige, described by an inscription which described the Gajapati king as "a yawning lion to the sheep of the Karnatak King". Mallikarjuna's successor Virupaksha Raya II led a life of pleasure pursuing wine and women leading to the loss of Goa and much of Karnataka to the Bahmani Sultanate. His governor Saluva Narasimha reduced the loss of territory by holding almost all of coastal Andhra Pradesh south of the Krishna river, Chittoor, the two Arcots and Kolar. Saluva Narashimha defeated the Gajapatis and held Udayagiri, drove out the Pandyas from Tanjore, and took procession of Machilipatnam and Kondaveedu. He later defeated Bahmani forces and recovered most of the empire's earlier losses.

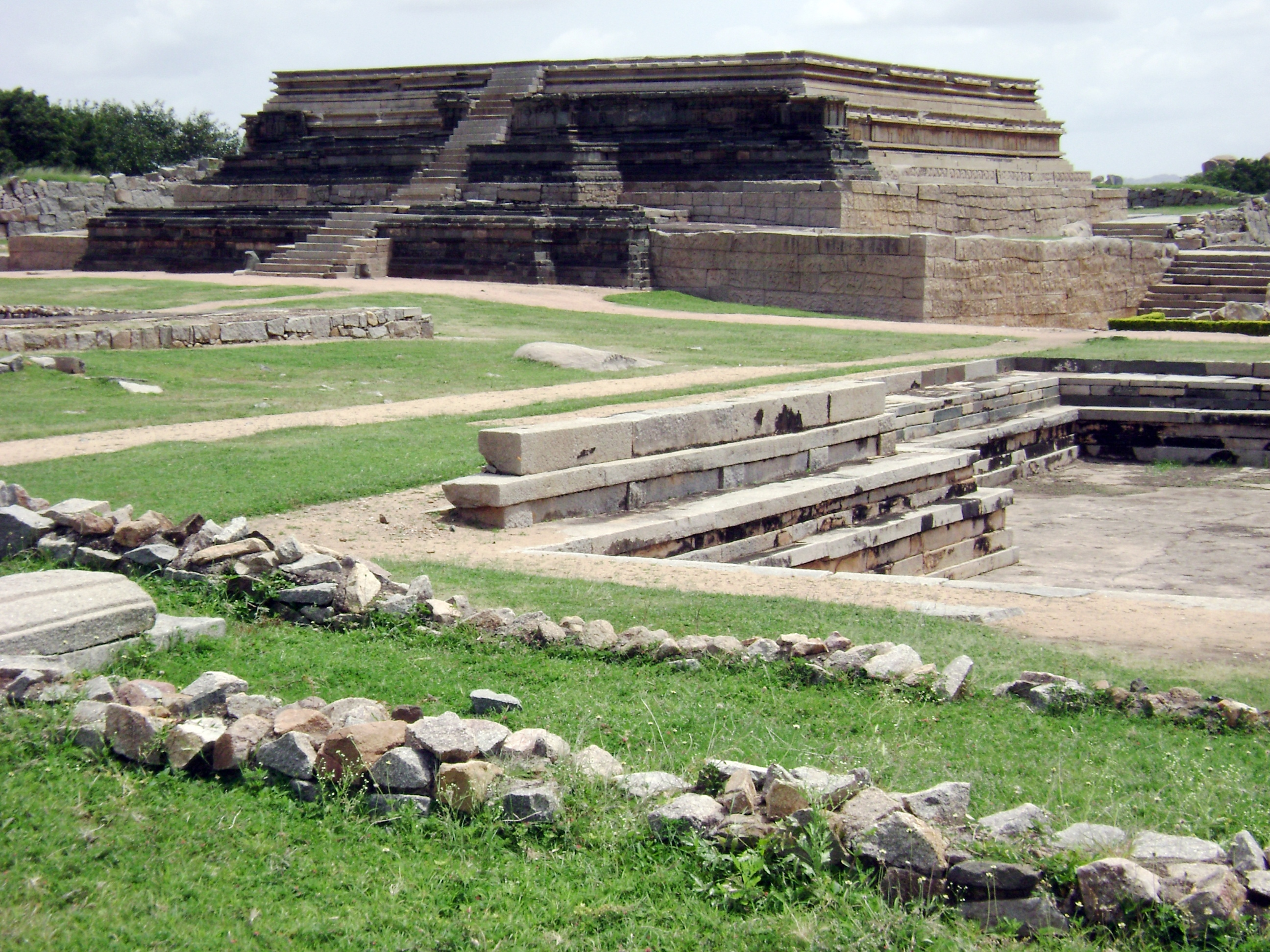
"Throne platform" or "Victory Platform" or "Mahanavami Dibba" or "Dussera Dibba". This surviving structure is in the Royal Enclosure.

After the death of Virupaksha Raya II in 1485, Saluva Narasimha led a coup that ended the dynastic rule while continuing to defend the empire from raids by the Sultanates created from the continuing disintegration of the Bahmani Sultanate in its north. Saluva Narasimha left his two adolescent sons under the care of general Tuluva Narasa Nayaka who ably defended the empire from their traditional enemies, the Gajapati king and the Bahmani Sultan. He also subdued rebelling chiefs of the Chera, the Chola and the Pandya territories. Despite many attempts by nobles and members of the royal family to overthrow him, Narasa Nayaka retained control as regent till 1503.

In 1503, Narasa Nayaka's son Vira Narasimha had prince Immadi Narasimha of the Saluva dynasty assassinated and took over the rule in a coup thus becoming the first of the Tuluva dynasty rulers. This did not go well with the nobles who revolted. Seeing internal troubles grow, the Gajapati king and the Bahmani Sultan began to encroach on the empire even as the governors of Ummattur, Adoni, and Talakad colluded to capture the Tungabhadra-Krishna river doab region from the empire. The empire came under the rule of Krishna Deva Raya in 1509, another son of Tuluva Narasa Nayaka. Initially Krishnadevaraya faced many obstacles including dissatisfied nobles, the rebellious chief of Ummattur in the south, a resurgent Gajapati kingdom under King Prataparudra, a growing threat from the newly formed Adil Shahi Sultanate of Bijapur under Yusuf Adil Khan and Portuguese interest in controlling the west coast. Not one to be unnerved by these pressures he strengthened and consolidated the empire, one victory at a time. He was an astute ruler who hired both Hindus and Muslims into his army. In the following decades, the empire covered Southern India and successfully defeated invasions from the five established Deccan sultanates to its north.

=== Empire's peak ===
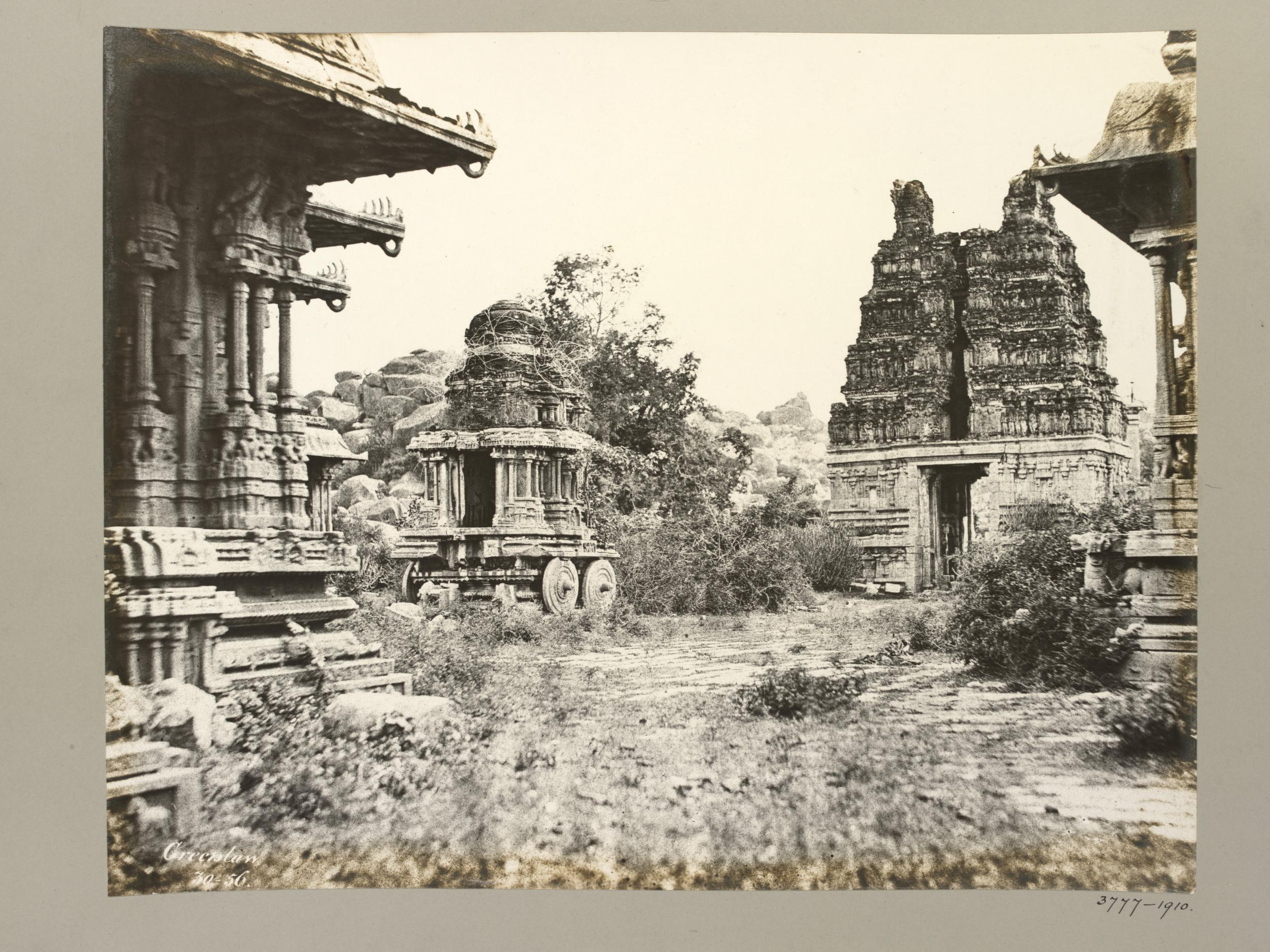
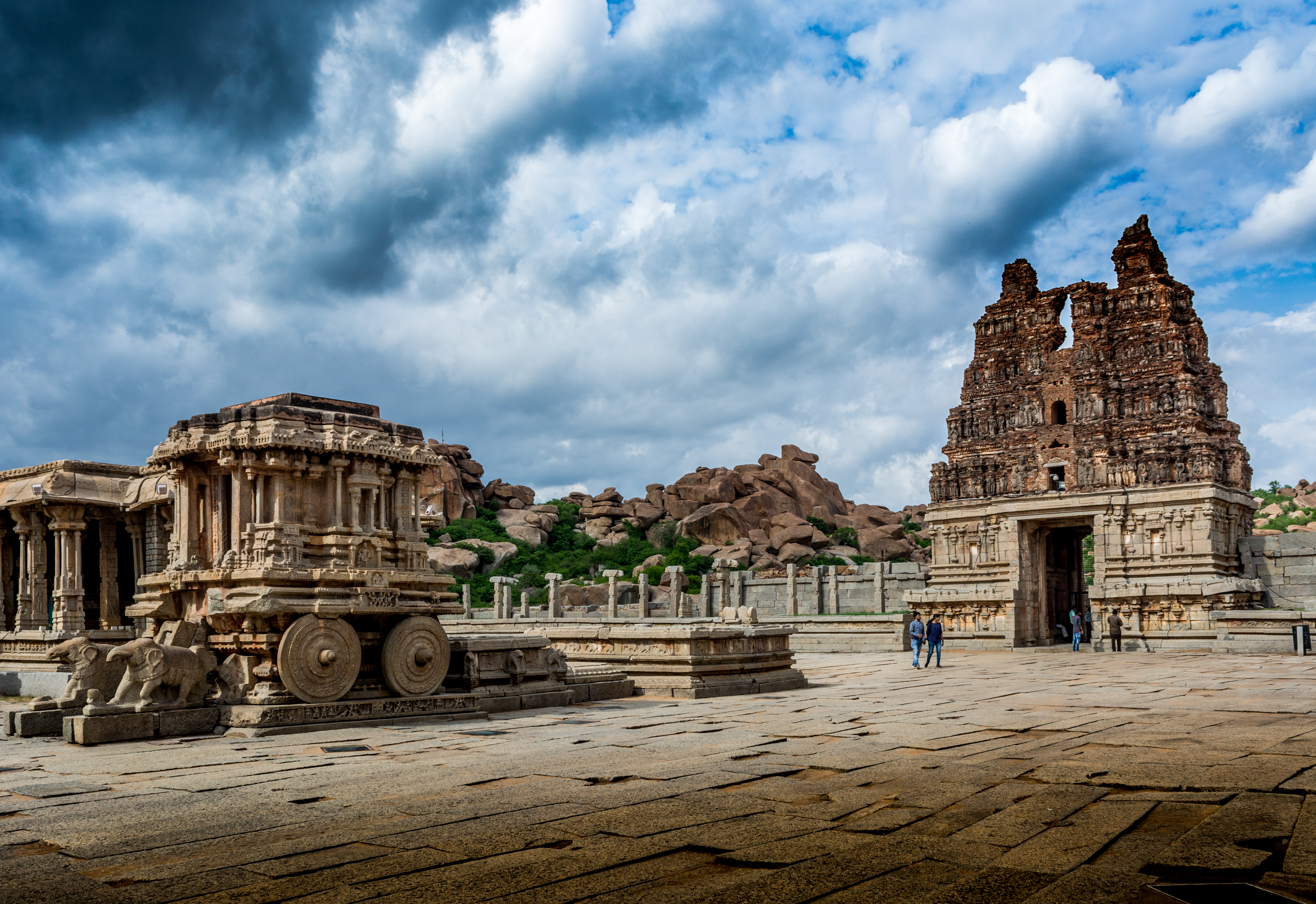
The Garuda stone chariot and Vitthala temple gopuram in 1856 (left) and 2016

The empire reached its peak during the rule of Krishna Deva Raya (1509–1529) when Vijayanagara armies were consistently victorious. The empire gained territory from the Deccan sultanates, including Raichur in 1520 and Gulbarga in the central Deccan, and from wars with Sultan Quli Qutb Shah of Golconda in the eastern Deccan; the Kalinga region as well was gained from the Gajapatis of Odisha. This was in addition to the already established presence in the southern Deccan. (Note: The notes of Portuguese Barbosa confirms a very rich and well provided Vijayanagara city Kamath 2001, p. 186.) Many important monuments were either completed or commissioned during the time of Emperor Krishna Deva Raya.

Krishna Deva Raya was succeeded by his younger half-brother Achyuta Deva Raya in 1529. When Achyuta Deva Raya died in 1542, Sadashiva Raya, the teenage nephew of Achyuta Raya, was appointed emperor, with Rama Raya, Krishna Deva Raya's son-in-law, becoming the caretaker. When Sadashiva Raya was old enough to assert his independent claim over the throne, Rama Raya made him a virtual prisoner and became the de facto ruler. He hired Muslim generals in his army from his previous diplomatic connections with the Deccan sultanates and called himself "Sultan of the World". This included both Deccani Muslims recruited from anywhere in the Deccan or Westerners from beyond the Persian Gulf. He was keenly interfering in the internal affairs of the various sultanates in the Deccan and on playing off the Muslim powers against one another, while making himself the ruler of the most powerful and influential regional power. This worked for a while but eventually made him very unpopular among his people and the Muslim rulers. He made a commercial treaty with the Portuguese to stop the supply of horses to Bijapur, then defeated the Bijapur sultan and inflicted humiliating defeats on Golconda and Ahmadnagar.

=== Civil War ===
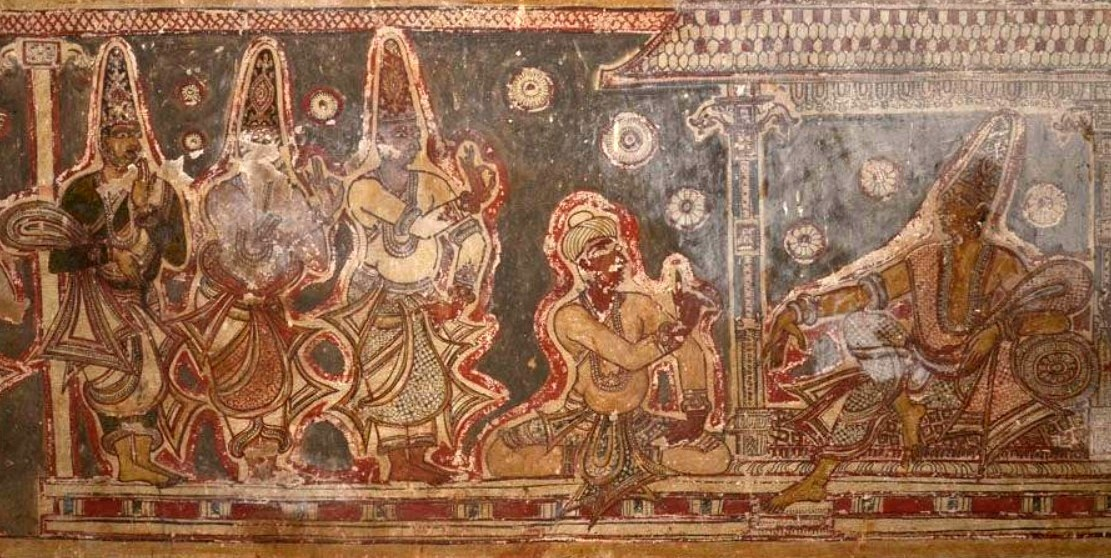
King Achyuta Deva Raya giving audience at his court, from the Tiruppudaimarudur murals, 1600s

Vijayanagara Civil War (1542–1543) was a chaotic succession conflict right after the death of Emperor Achyuta Deva Raya (r. 1529–1542), the younger brother of the former Emperor Krishnadevaraya. Achyuta Deva Raya succeeded his elder brother Krishnadevaraya in 1529. He was a capable ruler who defended the empire against external threats from the Bijapur Sultanate and conducted successful southern campaigns during the Battle of Tamraparni in 1532, with his trusted general Salakaraju Tirumala, who was his brother-in-law.

Achyuta died in June 1542. His young son, Venkata I (a minor), became the nominal successor. Salakaraju Tirumala acted as regent for young Venkata I but quickly turned ambitious. Salakaraju Tirumala usurped real power, imprisoned and sidelined rivals. He had Venkata I (his own nephew) assassinated. He murdered other members of the royal family to eliminate competition. Salakaraju Tirumala briefly crowned himself, ruled as a tyrant from 1542–1543. In desperation, he invited the Bijapur Sultan for military help, allowed him to sit on the throne symbolically, an extremely unpopular move that outraged the Vijayanagara nobility, sparking the civil war.

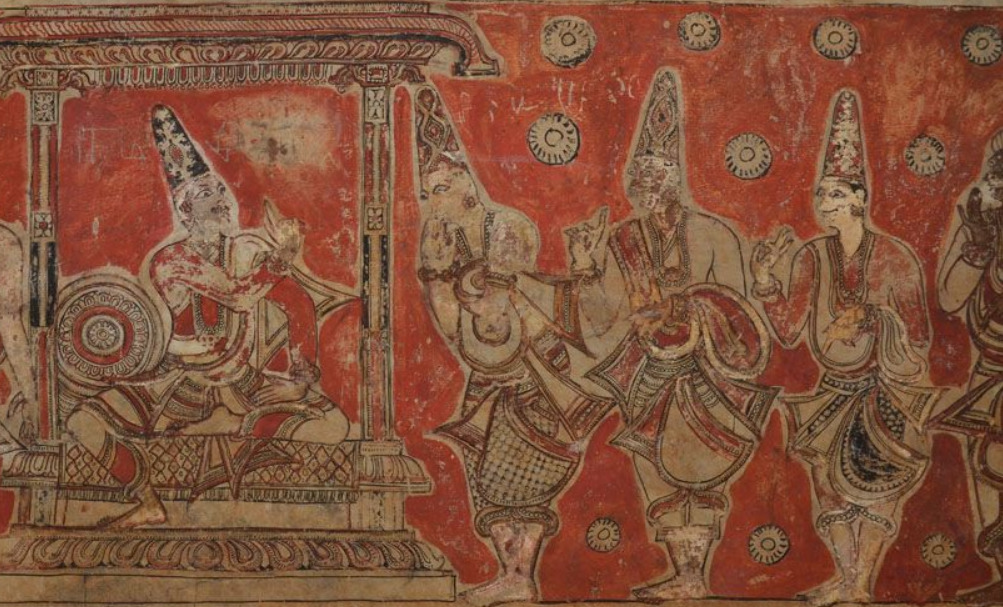
Salakaraju Tirumala with Vijayanagara courtiers as depicted in the Tiruppudaimarudur murals, 1600s

Rama Raya, former Emperor Krishnadevaraya's son-in-law and a powerful noble opposed Salakaraju. He supported Sadasiva Raya, a young nephew of Achyuta for the throne. Rama Raya gathered support from nobles disgusted by Salakaraju's tyranny and foreign alliances. Salakaraju was defeated and killed, along with some of his close supporters like his brother Pedda Tirumala by Rama Raya's forces at the Battle of the Tungabadhra in 1543.

Sadasiva Raya was placed on the throne (r. ~1543–1570s) though mostly nominal. Rama Raya became the de facto ruler/regent and dominated Vijayanagara politics for the next two decades until the catastrophic Battle of Talikota in 1565. The civil war weakened the empire internally through factionalism, assassinations, and inviting Deccan Sultans into internal affairs, setting the stage for its later decline.

=== Defeat and decline ===
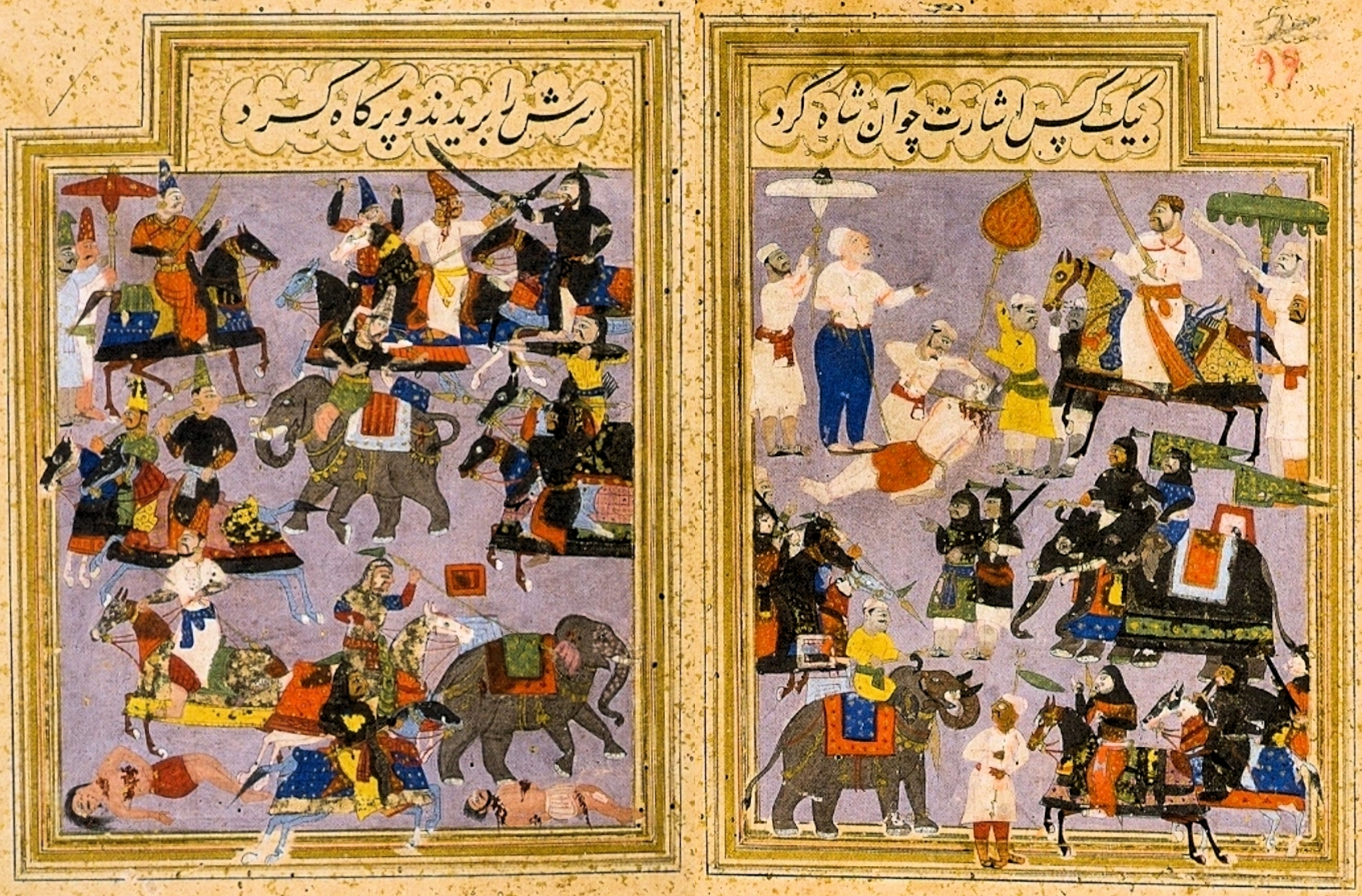
Panorama of the Battle of Talikota (1565). In the right panel, Husain Shah (riding a horse) orders the decapitation of Rama Raya (reigned 1542–1565), the defeated ruler of Vijayanagar. Ta'rif-i Husain Shahi (Chronicle of Husain Shah).

Eventually the Deccan sultanates to the north of Vijayanagara united and attacked Rama Raya's army in January 1565 in the Battle of Talikota. Regarding the Vijayanagara defeat in battle, Kamath opines that the Sultanate armies, though numerically disadvantaged, were better equipped and trained. Their artillery was manned by expert Turkish gunmen while the Vijayanagara army depended on European mercenaries using outdated artillery. The Sultanate cavalry rode fast moving Persian horses and used spears that were fifteen to sixteen feet long giving them a greater reach, and their archers used metal crossbows which enabled their arrows to reach longer distances. In comparison, the Vijayanagara army depended on slow-moving war elephants, a cavalry riding mostly locally bred weaker horses (Rama Raya had stopped buying Persian horses for his army) wielding shorter-reach javelins, and their archers used traditional bamboo bows with a shorter range. Richard Eaton argues that Vijayanagara's inferiority was due to Krishna Raya's failure to invest in military technology in the years since Raichur because his victory against a technologically superior army led him to underestimate technology's value.

Despite these disadvantages, Kamath, Hermann Kulke and Dietmar Rothermund concur that the vast Vijayanagara army appeared to have the upper hand until two Muslim generals (identified as the mercenary Gilani brothers according to Kamath) switched sides and joined forces with the Deccan sultanates turning the tide decisively in favor of them. The generals captured Rama Raya and beheaded him, and Sultan Hussain had the severed head stuffed with straw for display. Rama Raya's beheading created confusion and havoc in the Vijayanagara army, which were then completely routed. The Deccan sultanates' army plundered Hampi and reduced it to the ruinous state in which it remains today.

After Rama Raya's death, Tirumala Deva Raya started the Aravidu dynasty, founded a new capital of Penukonda to replace the destroyed Hampi, and attempted to reconstitute the remains of Vijayanagara Empire. Tirumala abdicated in 1572, dividing the remains of his empire to his three sons. The Aravidu dynasty successors ruled the region but the empire collapsed in 1614, and the final remains ended in 1646, from continued wars with the Bijapur sultanate and others. The end of the empire led to the formation of the Anegundi kingdom by the last emperor's successors.

During this period, more kingdoms in South India became independent and separate from Vijayanagara, including the Nayakas of Chitradurga, Keladi Nayaka, Mysore Kingdom, Nayak Kingdom of Gingee, Nayaks of Tanjore, and Nayaks of Madurai.

== Governance ==
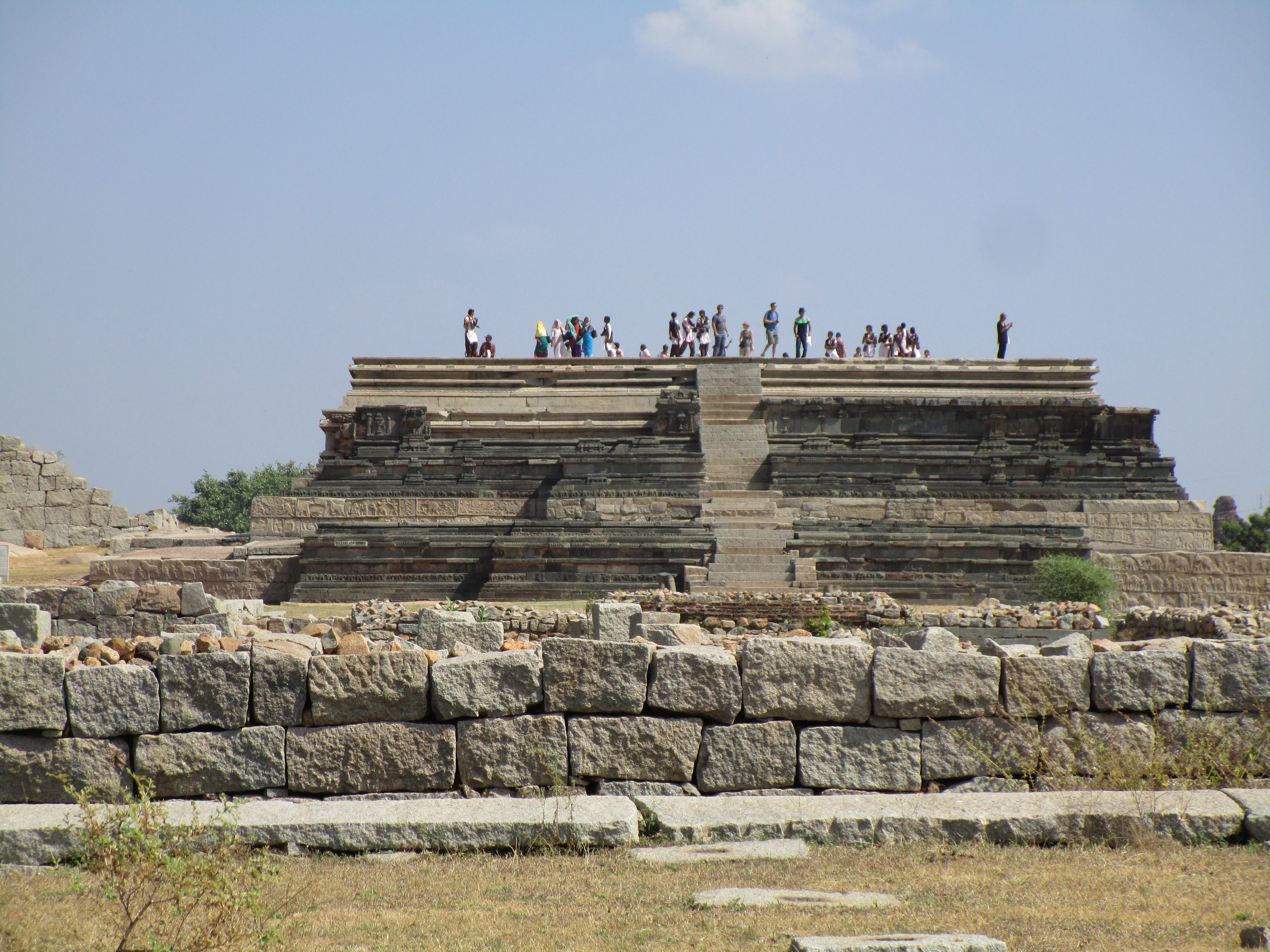
Tourists on top of Mahanavami Platform in Royal Enclosure

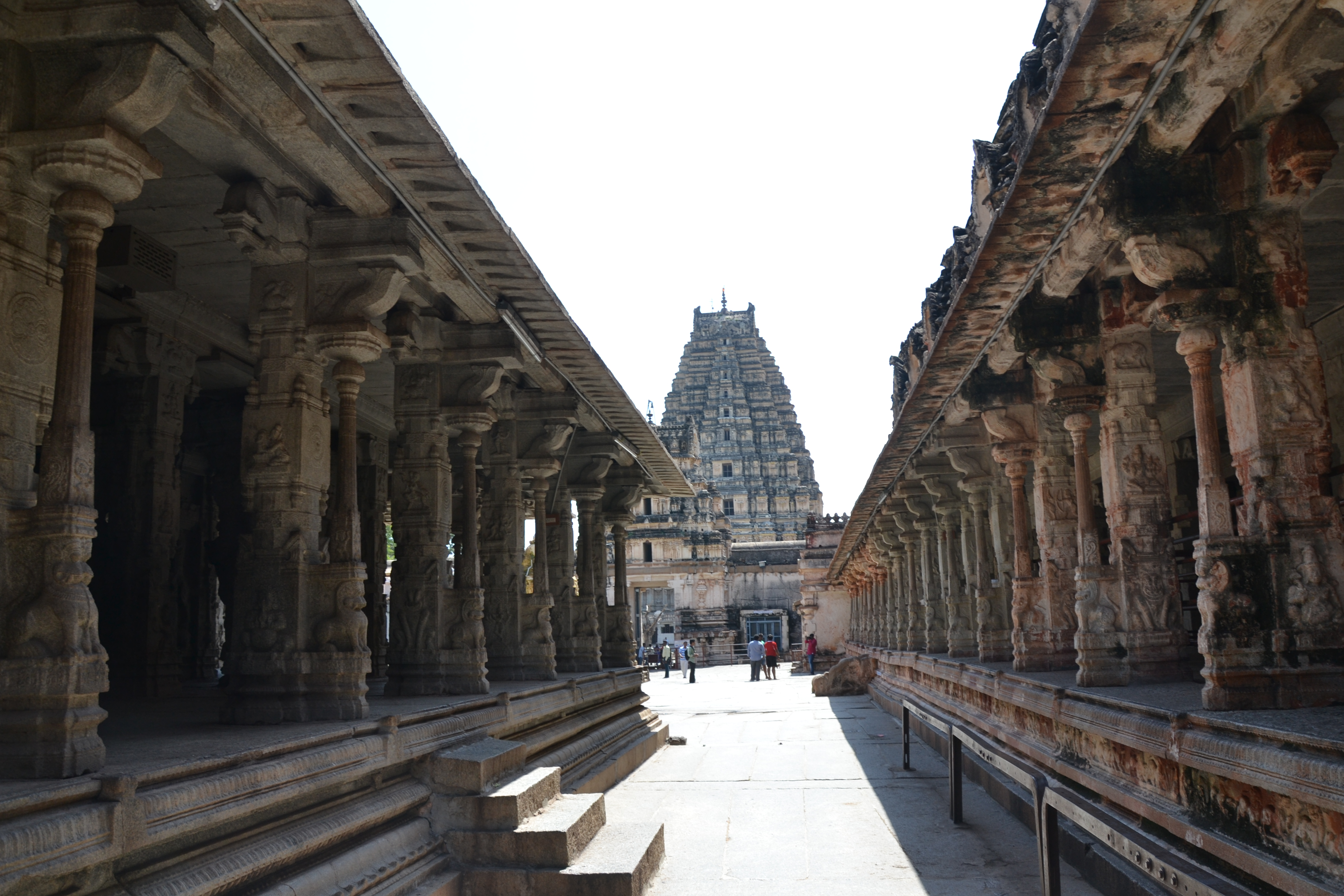
Corridor at Temple from Vijayanagara capital Hampi

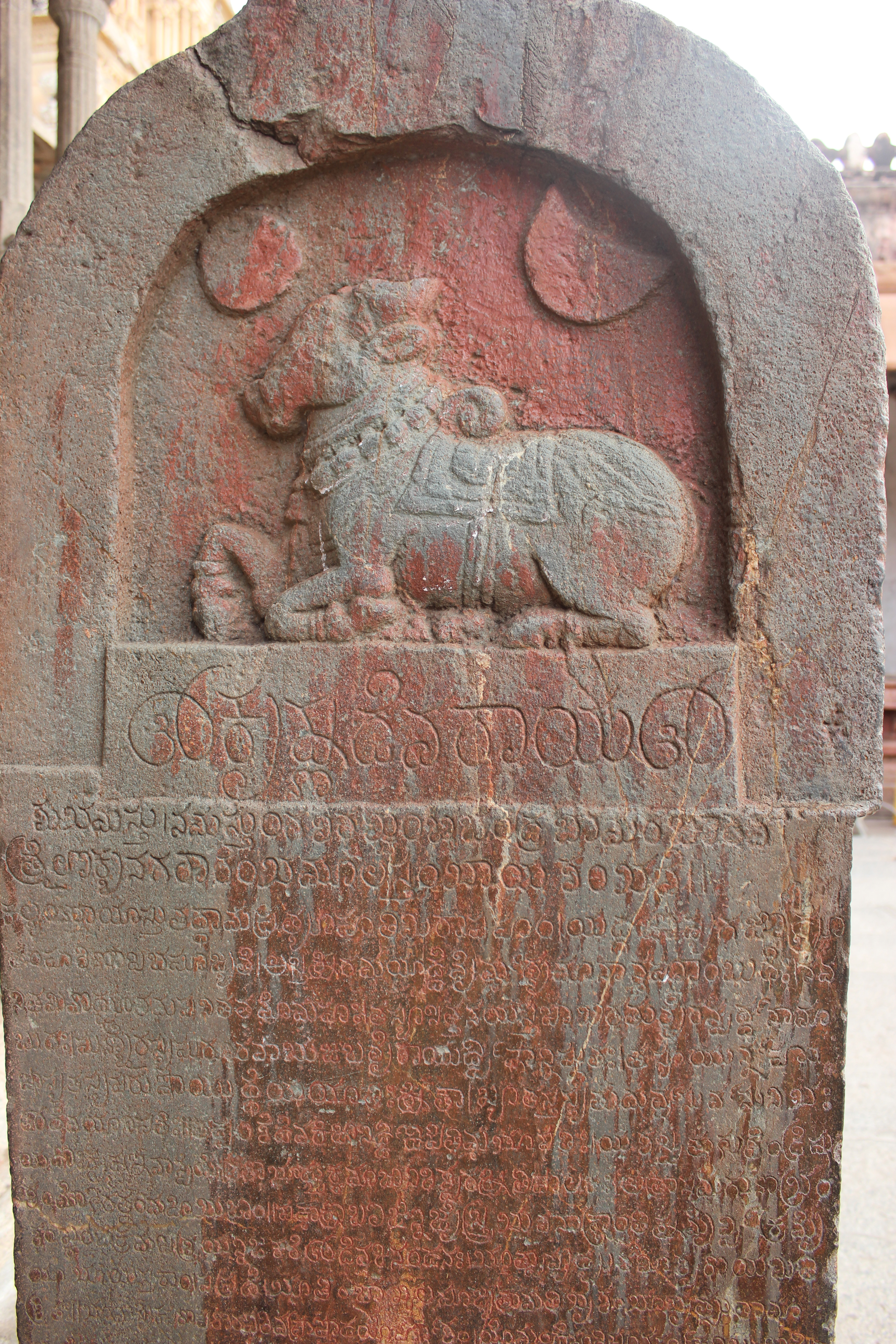
Kannada inscription of Emperor Krishna Deva Raya, dated 1509, at the Virupaksha temple in Hampi, describing his coronation and the construction of the large open mantapa

The rulers of the Vijayanagara Empire maintained the administrative methods developed by their predecessors, the Hoysala, Kakatiya and Pandya kingdoms. (Note: K.M. Panikkar in Kamath 2001, p. 174) The emperor, ministry, territory, fort, treasury, military, and ally formed the seven critical elements that influenced every aspect of governance. (Note: Svamin, Amatya, Janapada, Durga, Kosa, Daiufa, Mitra respectively.) The emperor was the ultimate authority, assisted by a cabinet of ministers (Pradhana) headed by the prime minister (Mahapradhana). Other important titles recorded were the chief secretary (Karyakartha or Rayaswami) and the imperial officers (Adhikari). All high-ranking ministers and officers were required to have military training. (Note: From the notes of Persian Abdur Razzak and research by B.A. Saletore in Kamath 2001, p. 175) A secretariat near the emperor's palace employed scribes and officers to maintain records made official by using a wax seal imprinted with the ring of the monarch. (Note: From the notes of Nuniz in Kamath 2001, p. 175) At the lower administrative levels, wealthy feudal landlords (Gowdas) supervised accountants (Karanikas or Karnam) and guards (Kavalu). The palace administration was divided into 72 departments (Niyogas), each having several female attendants chosen for their youth and beauty (some imported or captured in victorious battles) who were trained to handle minor administrative matters and to serve men of nobility as courtesans or concubines.

The empire was mentioned to be divided into main provinces (Rajya), each under a commander (Dandanayaka or Dandanatha) and headed by a governor, often from the royal family, who used the native language for administrative purposes. (Note: From the notes of Duarte Barbosa in Kamath 2001, p. 176, the Vijayanagara empire had 5 provinces. However, the empire may have had nine provinces (T. V. Mahalingam in Kamath 2001, p. 176)) A Rajya was divided into regions (Vishaya, Vente or Kottam) and further divided into counties (Sime or Nadu), themselves subdivided into municipalities (Kampana or Sthala). Hereditary families ruled their respective territories and paid tribute to the empire, while some areas, such as Keladi and Madurai, came under the direct supervision of a commander.

The main provinces (Rājya) in the latter half of the 14th century were the following:

1. Udayagiri rājya
2. Penugoṇḍa rājya
3. Candragiri rājya
4. Paḍaivīḍu rājya – seat in present-day Padavedu in Tiruvannamalai District
5. Tiruvadi rājya
6. Muḷuvāyi rājya – generally was the vice-regal seat of the government of the eldest son of the reigning Vijayanagara monarch
7. Śāntalige rājya
8. Āraga rājya – capital: Chandragutti in Shimoga district
9. Tuḷuva rājya – capital: Mangalore

Because of the rapid expansion of the empire, over the years, several new provinces were created. Other rajyas mentioned along the years included: Barkur rājya (division of Tulu rajya), Tiruchirappalli rājya, Gutti rājya, Valudilambattu rājya, Nagamangala rājya, Hoysala rājya (Seat in Srirangapatna), Nidugal rājya, Haive rājya (Seat: Banavasi), Konkana rājya (Seat: Gove), Kandanavolu rājya, Rayadurgam rājya, Kondapalli rājya and Kondavidu rājya.

The explorer Duarte Barbosa mentioned that the Vijayanagara empire was divided into five vast provinces; each one with its own language, which were: 1- Tolinate (Tulu Nadu), 2- Danseam Rayen (Unidentified), 3- Telingu (Telangana), 4- Bisnaga (Vijayanagara) proper or Canarim (Karnataka) and 5- Charamandel (Coromandel, which came from Chola-Mandalam).

On the battlefield, the emperor's commanders led the troops. The empire's war strategy rarely involved massive invasions; more often it employed small-scale methods such as attacking and destroying individual forts. The empire was among the first in India to use long-range artillery, which were commonly manned by foreign gunners. Army troops were of two types: the emperor's personal army directly recruited by the empire and the feudal army under each feudatory. Emperor Krishnadevaraya's personal army consisted of 100,000 infantry, 20,000 cavalrymen, and over 900 elephants. The whole army was claimed to number over 1.1 million soldiers, with up to 2 million having been recorded, along with a navy led by a Navigadaprabhu (commander of the navy). (Note: From the notes of Abdur Razzaq and Paes in Kamath 2001, p. 176) The army recruited from all classes of society, supported by the collection of additional feudal tributes from feudatory rulers, and consisted of archers and musketeers wearing quilted tunics, shieldmen with swords and poignards in their girdles, and soldiers carrying shields so large that armour was not necessary. The horses and elephants were fully armoured and the elephants had knives fastened to their tusks to do maximum damage in battle. (Note: From the notes of Nuniz in Nilakanta Sastri 1955, p. 288)

The capital city was dependent on water supply systems constructed to channel and store water, ensuring a consistent supply throughout the year. The remains of these hydraulic systems have given historians a picture of the prevailing surface water distribution methods in use at that time in the semiarid regions of South India. Contemporary records and notes of foreign travellers describe huge tanks constructed by labourers. (Note: From the notes of Domingo Paes and Nuniz in Davison-Jenkins 2001, p. 98) Excavations uncovered the remains of a well-connected water distribution system existing solely within the royal enclosure and the large temple complexes (suggesting it was for the exclusive use of royalty, and for special ceremonies) with sophisticated channels using gravity and siphons to transport water through pipelines. In the fertile agricultural areas near the Tungabhadra River, canals were dug to guide the river water into irrigation tanks. These canals had sluices that were opened and closed to control the water flow. In other areas, the administration encouraged digging wells, which were monitored by administrative authorities. Large tanks in the capital city were constructed with royal patronage while smaller tanks were funded by wealthy individuals to gain social and religious merit.

== Economy ==
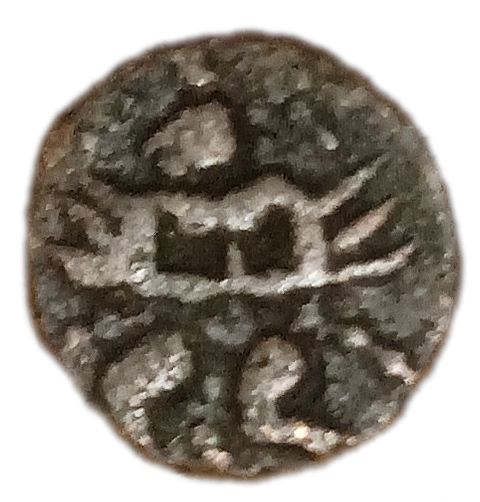
Copper Jital coin of the Vijayanagar Empire, struck during the reign of Krishnadevaraya, having the Garuda motif on obverse

The economy of the empire was largely dependent on agriculture. Wheat, sorghum (jowar), cotton, and pulse legumes grew in semi-arid regions, while sugarcane and rice thrived in rainy areas. Betel leaves, areca (for chewing), and coconut were the principal cash crops, and large-scale cotton production supplied the weaving centers of the empire's vibrant textile industry. Spices such as turmeric, pepper, cardamom, and ginger grew in the remote Malnad hill region and were transported to the city for trade. The empire's capital city was a thriving business centre that included a burgeoning market in large quantities of precious gems and gold. Prolific temple-building provided employment to thousands of masons, sculptors, and other skilled artisans. (Note: From the notes of Duarte Barbosa. Kamath 2001, p. 181)

According to Abdur Razzak, much of the empire was fertile and well cultivated. (Note: From the notes of Abdur Razzak in Nilakanta Sastri 1955, p. 304) Most of the growers were tenant farmers and were given the right of part ownership of the land over time. Tax policies encouraging needed produce made distinctions between land use to determine tax levies. For example, the daily market availability of rose petals was important for perfumers, so cultivation of roses received a lower tax assessment. Salt production and the manufacture of salt pans were controlled by similar means. The making of ghee (clarified butter), which was sold as an oil for human consumption and as a fuel for lighting lamps, was profitable. Exports to China intensified and included cotton, spices, jewels, semi-precious stones, ivory, rhino horn, ebony, amber, coral, and aromatic products such as perfumes. Large vessels from China made frequent visits and brought Chinese products to the empire's 300 ports, large and small, on the Arabian Sea and the Bay of Bengal. The ports of Mangalore, Honavar, Bhatkal, Barkur, Cochin, Cannanore, Machilipatnam, and Dharmadam were important for they not only provided secure harbors for traders from Africa, Arabia, Aden, the Red sea, China and Bengal but some also served as ship building centers.

When merchant ships docked, the merchandise was taken into official custody and taxes levied on all items sold. The security of the merchandise was guaranteed by the administration officials. Traders of many nationalities (Arabs, Persians, Guzerates, Khorassanians) settled in Calicut, drawn by the thriving trade business. Ship building prospered and keeled ships between 1000 and 1200 bahares (burden) were built without decks by sewing the entire hull with ropes rather than fastening them with nails. Ships sailed to the Red Sea ports of Aden and Mecca with Vijayanagara goods sold as far away as Venice. The empire's principal exports were pepper, ginger, cinnamon, cardamom, myrobalan, tamarind timber, anafistula, precious and semi-precious stones, pearls, musk, ambergris, rhubarb, aloe, cotton cloth and porcelain. Cotton yarn was shipped to Burma and indigo to Persia. Chief imports from Palestine were copper, quicksilver (mercury), vermilion, coral, saffron, coloured velvets, rose water, knives, coloured camlets, gold and silver. Persian horses were imported to Cannanore before a two-week land trip to the capital. Silk arrived from China and sugar from Bengal.

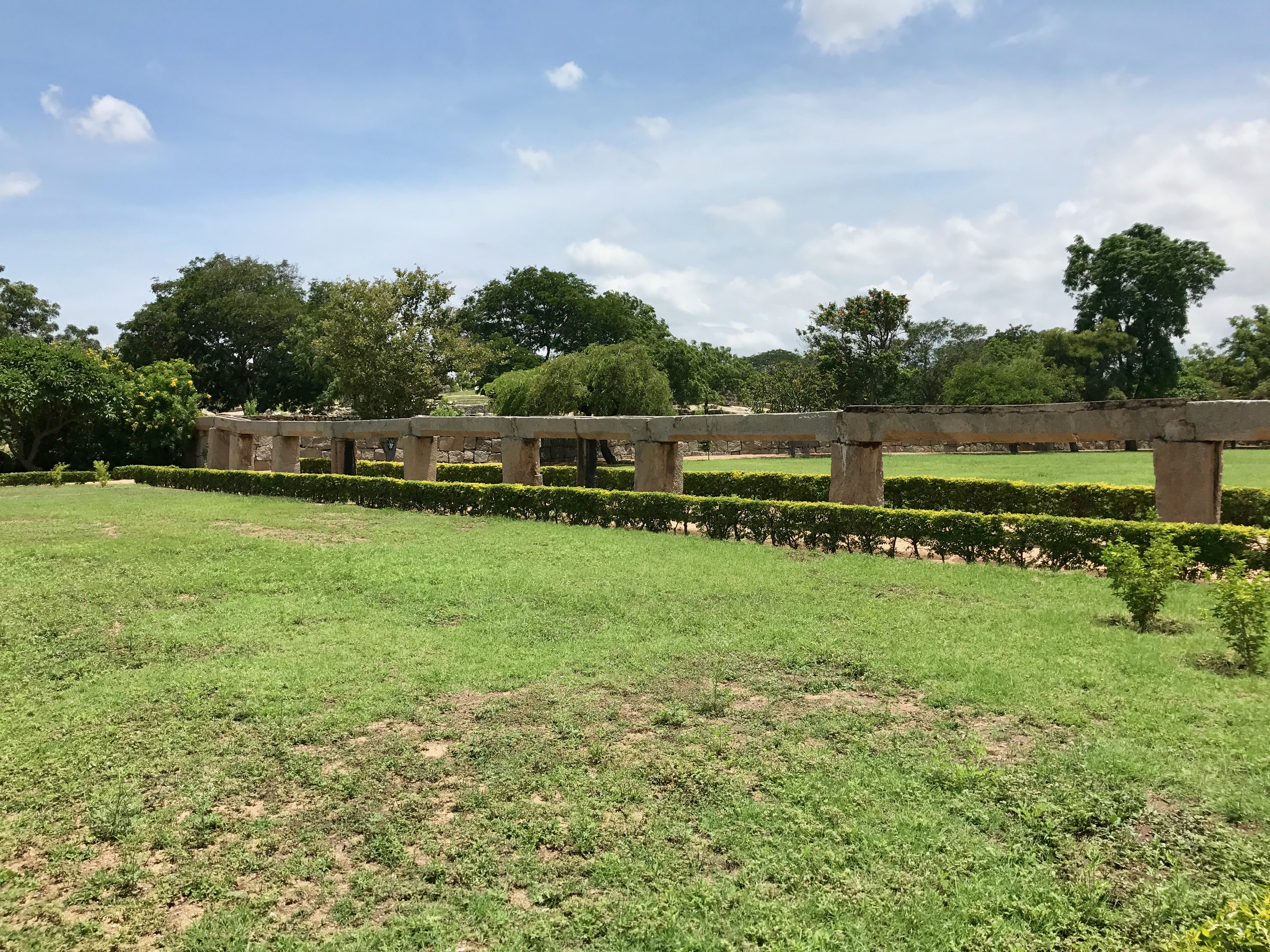
Raised water-channel or aqueduct for city.

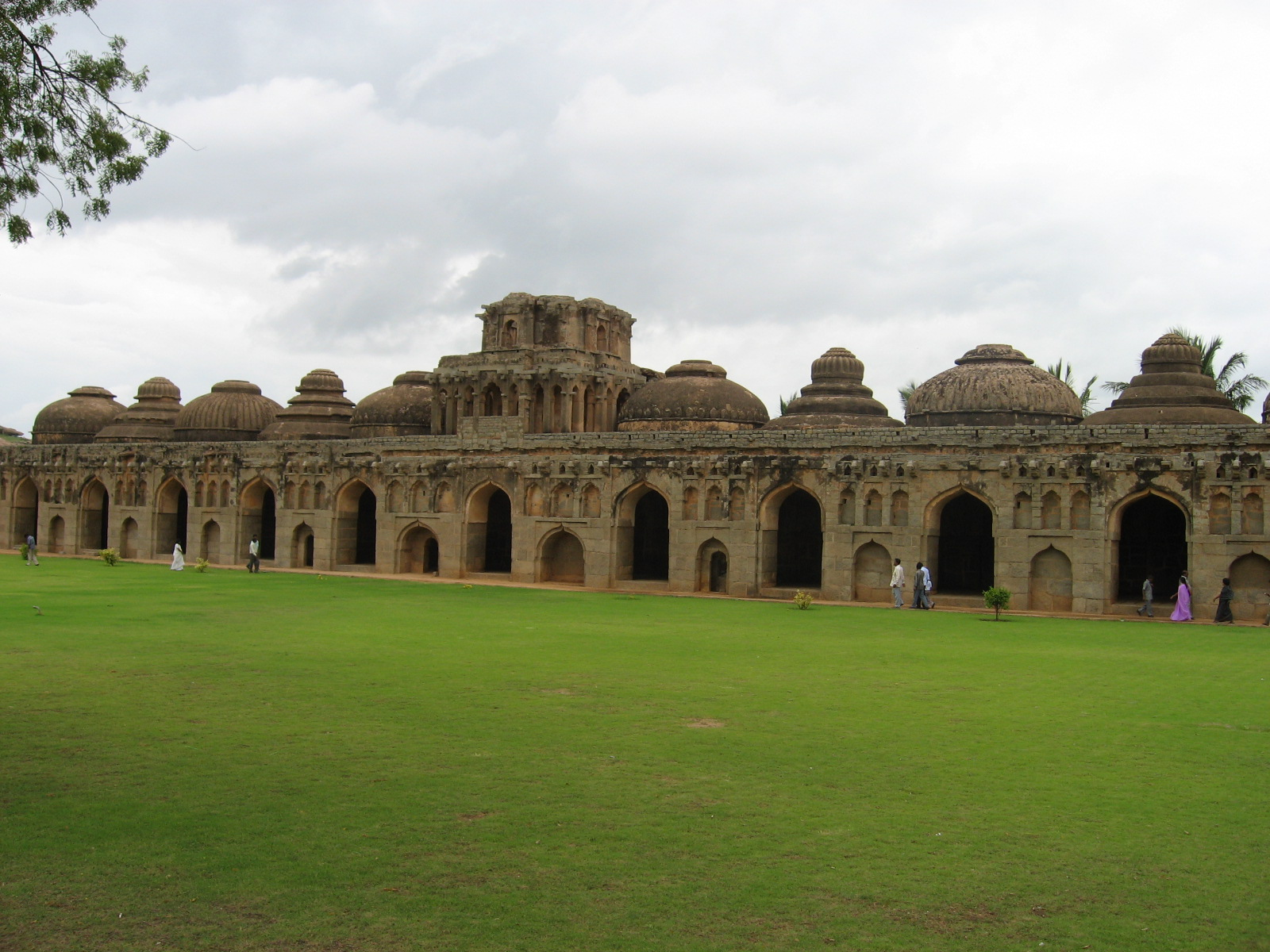
Gajashaala or elephant's stable, built by the Vijayanagara rulers for their war elephants

East coast trade routes were busy, with goods arriving from Golkonda where rice, millet, pulses and tobacco were grown on a large scale. Dye crops of indigo and chay root were produced for the weaving industry. A mineral rich region, Machilipatnam was the gateway for high quality iron and steel exports. Diamond mining was active in the Kollur region. The cotton weaving industry produced two types of cottons, plain calico and muslin (brown, bleached or dyed). Cloth printed with coloured patterns crafted by native techniques were exported to Java and the Far East. Golkonda specialised in plain cotton and Pulicat in printed. The main imports on the east coast were non-ferrous metals, camphor, porcelain, silk and luxury goods.

Mahanavami festival marked the beginning of a financial year from when the state treasury accounted for and reconciled all outstanding dues within nine days. At this time, an updated annual assessment record of provincial dues, which included rents and taxes, paid on a monthly basis by each governor was created under royal decree.

Temples were taxed for land ownership to cover military expenses. In the Telugu districts the temple tax was called Srotriyas, in the Tamil speaking districts it was called as Jodi. Taxes such as Durgavarthana, Dannayivarthana and Kavali Kanike were collected towards protection of movable and immovable wealth from robbery and invasions. Jeevadhanam was collected for cattle graze on non-private lands. Popular temple destinations charged visitor fees called Perayam or Kanike. Residential property taxes were called Illari.

== Culture ==
=== Social life ===
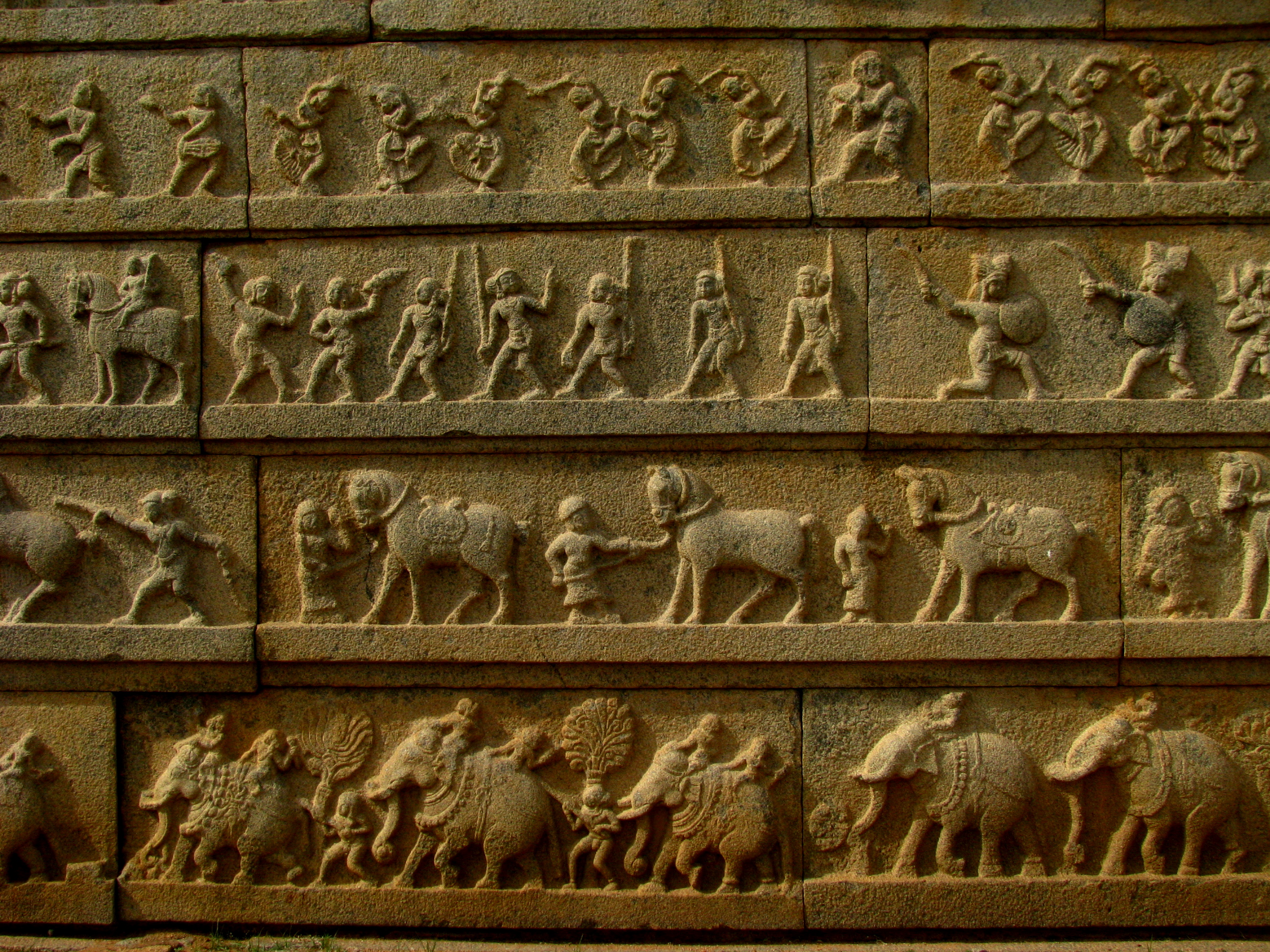
Horizontal friezes in relief on the outer wall enclosure of Hazara Rama temple, depicting life in the empire

The Hindu social order was prevalent and it influenced daily life in the empire. The rulers who occupied the top of this hierarchy assumed the honorific Varnasramadharma (lit, "helpers of the four classes and four stages"). According to Talbot, caste was more importantly determined by occupation or the professional community people belonged to, although the family lineage (Gotra) and the broad distinction described in sacred Hindu texts were also factors. The structure also contained sub-castes and caste clusters ("Jati"). According to Vanina, caste as a social identity was not fixed and was constantly changed for reasons including polity, trade and commerce, and was usually determined by context. Identification of castes and sub-castes was made based on temple affiliations, lineage, family units, royal retinues, warrior clans, occupational groups, agricultural and trade groups, devotional networks, and even priestly cabals. It was also not impossible for a caste to lose its position and prestige and slip down the ladder while others rose up the same. Epigraphy studies by Talbot suggests that members within a family could have different social status based on their occupation and the upward movement of a caste or sub-caste was not uncommon based on the breakthroughs achieved by an individual or a group of individuals from the community.

Caste affiliation was closely tied to craft production and members of a common craft formed collective memberships. Often members of related crafts formed inter-caste communities. This helped them consolidate strength and gain political representation and trade benefits. According to Talbot, terminology such as Setti was used to identify communities across merchant and artisan classes while Boya identified herders of all types. Artisans consisted of blacksmiths, goldsmiths, brasssmiths and carpenters. These communities lived in separate sections of the city to avoid disputes, especially when it came to social privileges. Conquests led to large-scale migration of people leading to marginalisation of natives of a place. The Tottiyans were shepherds who later gained marginal ruling status (poligars), Saurashtrans were traders who came from present-day Gujarat and rivalled the Brahmins for some benefits, the Reddys were agriculturists and the Uppilia were salt farmers.

According to Chopra et al., in addition to their monopoly over priestly duties, Brahmins occupied high positions in political and administrative fields. The Portuguese traveler Domingo Paes observed an increasing presence of Brahmins in the military. The separation of the priestly class from material wealth and power made them ideal arbiters in local judicial matters, and the nobility and aristocracy ensured their presence in every town and village to maintain order. Vanina notes that within the warrior class was a conglomerate of castes, kinship and clans that usually originated from landholding and pastoral communities. They ascended the social ladder by abandoning their original occupations and adopting to a martial code of living, ethics and practices. In South India they were loosely called the Nayakas.

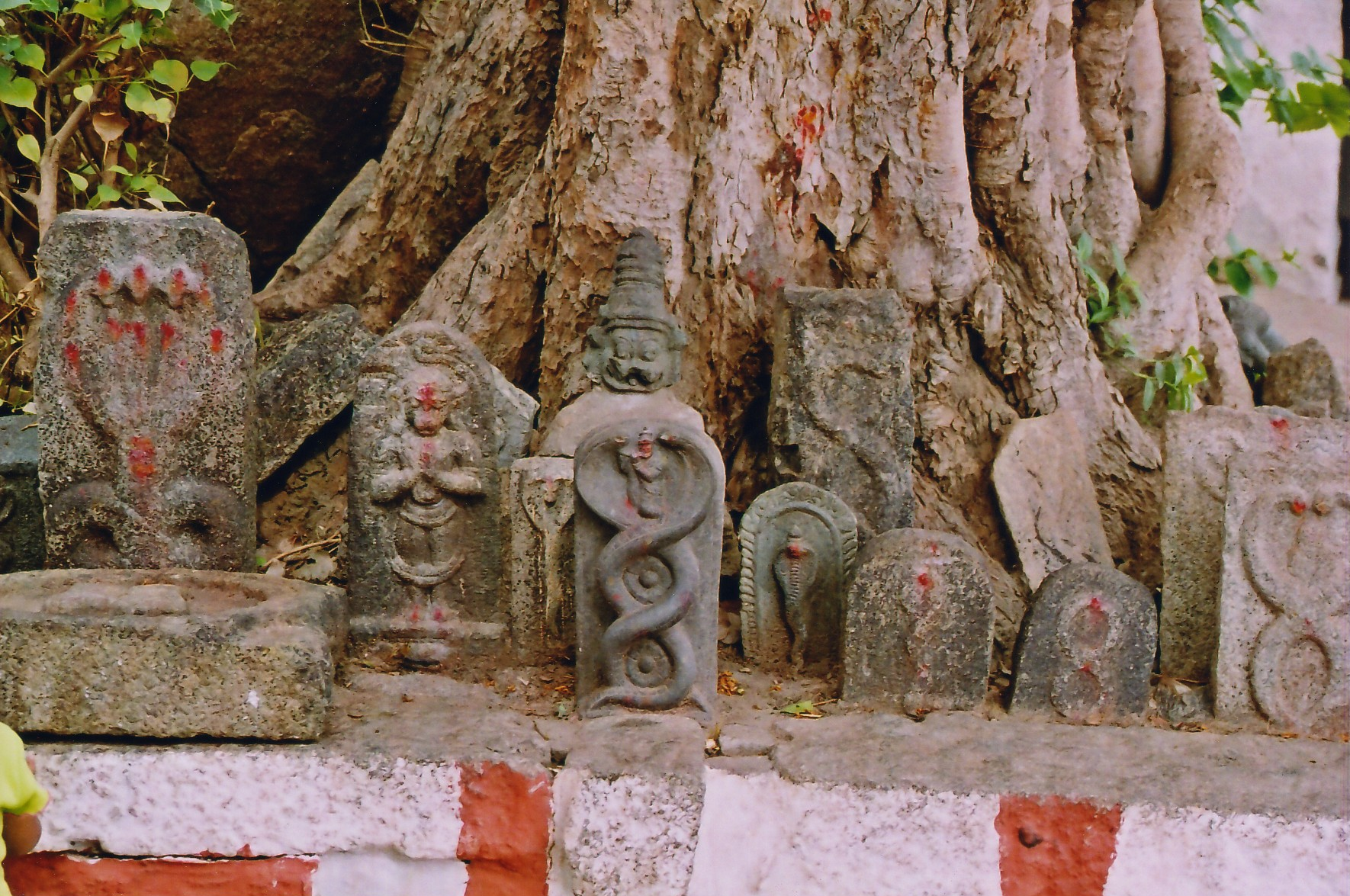
Nāga, snake worship in Hampi

Sati practice is evidenced in Vijayanagara ruins by several inscriptions known as Satikal (Sati stone) or Sati-virakal (Sati hero stone). There are controversial views among historians regarding this practice including religious compulsion, marital affection, martyrdom or honor against subjugation by foreign intruders.

The socio-religious movements that gained popularity in the previous centuries, such as Lingayatism, provided momentum for flexible social norms that helped the cause of women. By this time South Indian women had crossed most barriers and were actively involved in fields hitherto considered the monopoly of men such as administration, business, trade and the fine arts. (Note: B.A. Saletore in Kamath 2001, p. 179) Tirumalamba Devi who wrote Varadambika Parinayam and Gangadevi the author of Madhuravijayam were among the notable women poets of the Sanskrit language. Early Telugu women poets such as Tallapaka Timmakka and Atukuri Molla became popular. Further south the provincial Nayaks of Tanjore patronised several women poets. The Devadasi system, as well as legalized prostitution, existed and members of this community were relegated to a few streets in each city. The popularity of harems among men of the royalty and the existence of seraglio is well known from records.

Well-to-do men wore the Petha or Kulavi, a tall turban made of silk and decorated with gold. As in most Indian societies, jewellery was used by men and women and records describe the use of anklets, bracelets, finger-rings, necklaces and ear rings of various types. During celebrations men and women adorned themselves with flower garlands and used perfumes made of rose water, civet musk, musk, or sandalwood. In stark contrast to the commoners whose lives were modest, the lives of royalty were full of ceremonial pomp. Queens and princesses had numerous attendants who were lavishly dressed and adorned with fine jewellery. Their numbers ensured their daily duties were light. (Note: From the writings of Portuguese Domingo Paes Nilakanta Sastri 1955, p. 296.)

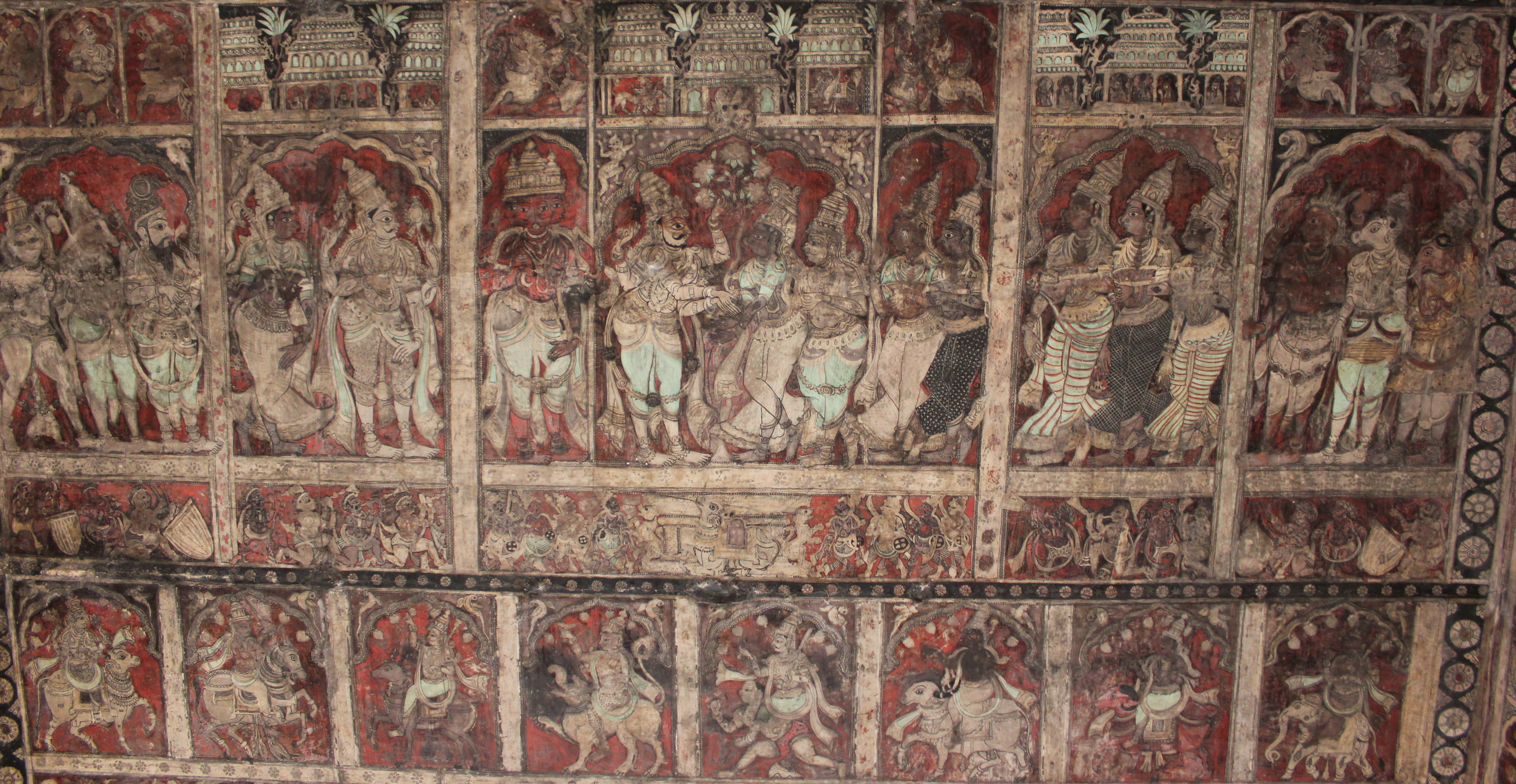
Painted ceiling from the Virupaksha temple depicting Hindu mythology, 14th century

Physical exercises were popular with men and wrestling was an important male preoccupation for sport and entertainment, and women wrestlers are also mentioned in records. Gymnasiums have been discovered inside royal quarters and records mention regular physical training for commanders and their armies during peacetime. Royal palaces and marketplaces had special arenas where royalty and common people amused themselves by watching sports such as cock fight, ram fight and female wrestling. Excavations within the Vijayanagara city limits have revealed the existence of various community-based gaming activities. Engravings on boulders, rock platforms and temple floors indicate these were popular locations of casual social interaction. Some of these are gaming boards similar to the ones in use today and others are yet to be identified.

Dowry was in practice and can be seen in both Hindu and Muslim royal families. When a sister of Sultan Ibrahim Adil Shah of Bijapur was married to Burhan Nizam Shah I of Ahmednagar, the town of Sholapur was given to the bride by her family. Ayyangar notes that when the Gajapati King of Kalinga gave his daughter in marriage honoring the victorious Krishnadevaraya he included several villages as dowry. Inscriptions of the 15th and 16th centuries record the practice of dowry among commoners as well. The practice of putting a price on the bride was a possible influence of the Islamic Mahr system. To oppose this influence, in the year 1553, the Brahmin community passed a mandate under royal decree and popularized the kanyadana within the community. According to this practice money could not be paid or received during marriage and those who did were liable for punishment. There is a mention of Streedhana ("woman's wealth") in an inscription and that the villagers should not give away land as dowry. These inscriptions reinforce the theory that a system of social mandates within community groups existed and were widely practiced even though these practices did not find justification in the family laws described in the religious texts.

=== Religion ===
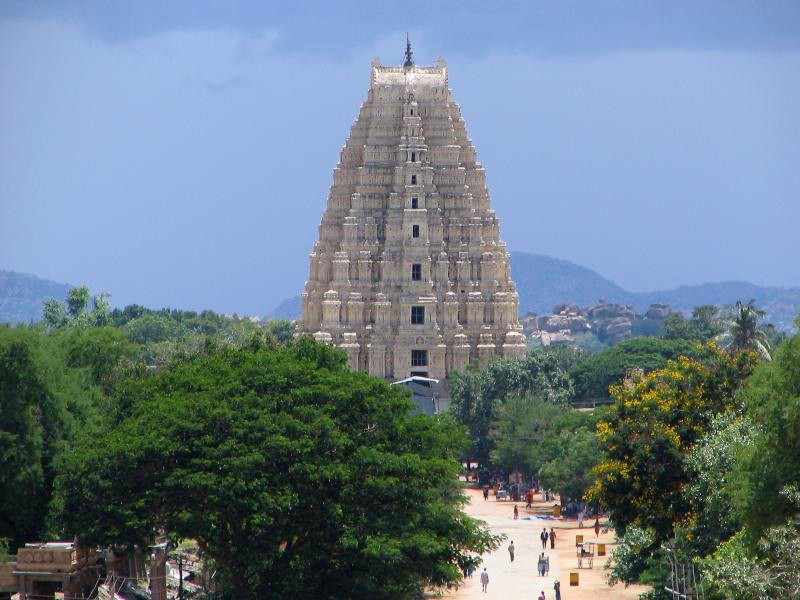
Virupaksha Temple, Hampi

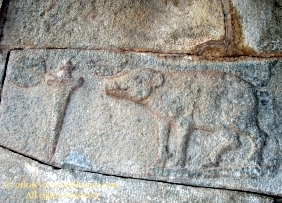
Royal insignia at Varaha Temple

The Vijayanagara emperors were tolerant of all religions and sects, as writings by foreign visitors show. (Note: From the notes of Duarte Barbosa in Kamath 2001, p. 178) The emperors used titles such as Gobrahamana Pratipalanacharya (literally, "protector of cows and Brahmins") that testified to their intention of protecting Hinduism. The Nāgarī script inscription at Hampi includes the term Hinduraya Suratrana, which historian Benjamin Lewis Rice translates as "the Suratrana of Hindu Rayas". Some scholars have interpreted this to mean "the Sultan among Hindu kings" and state this to be evidence of some Islamic political traditions being adopted by Hindu monarchs, (Note: The Hinduraya suratrana term in inscriptions has been coupled with long brocaded headdress (kullayi) and others shown in some royalty-related reliefs found in Hampi as additional support for the hypothesis that 'Islamicization of Hindu culture' in 14th-century.) The long headdress are also seen in the royalty-related and secular artwork in Pattadakal dated from the 7th and 8th century, about 5 centuries before the first Sultanate was formed in South Asia. Similar conical headdress is seen in other sites such as the Ajanta Caves, Ellora Caves, Aihole and Badami, variously dated from the 2nd century to 10th century. as well as that Indian kingdoms recognized their religious identity of being Hindu by the early 14th century. Others interpret the term Hinduraya Suratrana to mean "protectors of the gods of (or among) the Hindu kings". The empire's founders, the Sangama brothers (Harihara I and Bukka Raya I), came from a pastoral cowherd background, possibly the Kuruba people, that claimed Yadava lineage in an attempt to claim Kshatriya status like the rest of South Indian dynasties who originated from a pastoral background. (Note: Dhere 2011, p. 243: "We can deduce that Sangam must have become a Yadava through his pastoralist, cowherd community.") The founders of the empire were devout Shaivas (worshippers of the Hindu god Shiva) but made grants to Vishnu temples. Their patron saint Vidyaranya was from the Advaita order at Sringeri. The Varaha (the boar avatar of Vishnu) was the emblem of the empire. Over one-fourth of the archaeological dig found an "Islamic Quarter" not far from the "Royal Quarter". Nobles from Central Asia's Timurid kingdoms also came to Vijayanagara. The later Saluva and Tuluva kings were Vaishnava (followers of Vishnu) by faith, but also worshipped Venkateshwara (Vishnu) at Tirupati as well as Virupaksha (Shiva) at Hampi. A Sanskrit work, Jambavati Kalyanam by Emperor Krishnadevaraya, refers to Virupaksha as Karnata Rajya Raksha Mani ("protective jewel of Karnata Empire"). The kings patronised the saints of the dvaita order (philosophy of dualism) of Madhvacharya at Udupi. Endowments were made to temples in the form of land, cash, produce, jewellery and constructions.

The Bhakti (devotional) movement was active during this time, and involved well known Haridasas (devotee saints) of that time. Like the Virashaiva movement of the 12th century, this movement presented another strong current of devotion, pervading the lives of millions. The Haridasas represented two groups, the Vyasakuta and Dasakuta, the former being required to be proficient in the Vedas, Upanishads and other Darshanas, while the Dasakuta merely conveyed the message of Madhvacharya through the Kannada language to the people in the form of devotional songs (Devaranamas and Kirthanas). The philosophy of Madhvacharya was spread by eminent disciples such as Naraharitirtha, Jayatirtha, Sripadaraya, Vyasatirtha, Vadirajatirtha and others. Vyasatirtha, the guru (teacher) of Vadirajatirtha, Purandaradasa (Pitamaha or "Father of Carnatic music") and Kanakadasa earned the devotion of Emperor Krishnadevaraya. The emperor considered the saint his Kuladevata (family deity) and honoured him in his writings. During this time, another great composer of early carnatic music, Annamacharya composed hundreds of Kirthanas in Telugu at Tirupati in present-day Andhra Pradesh.

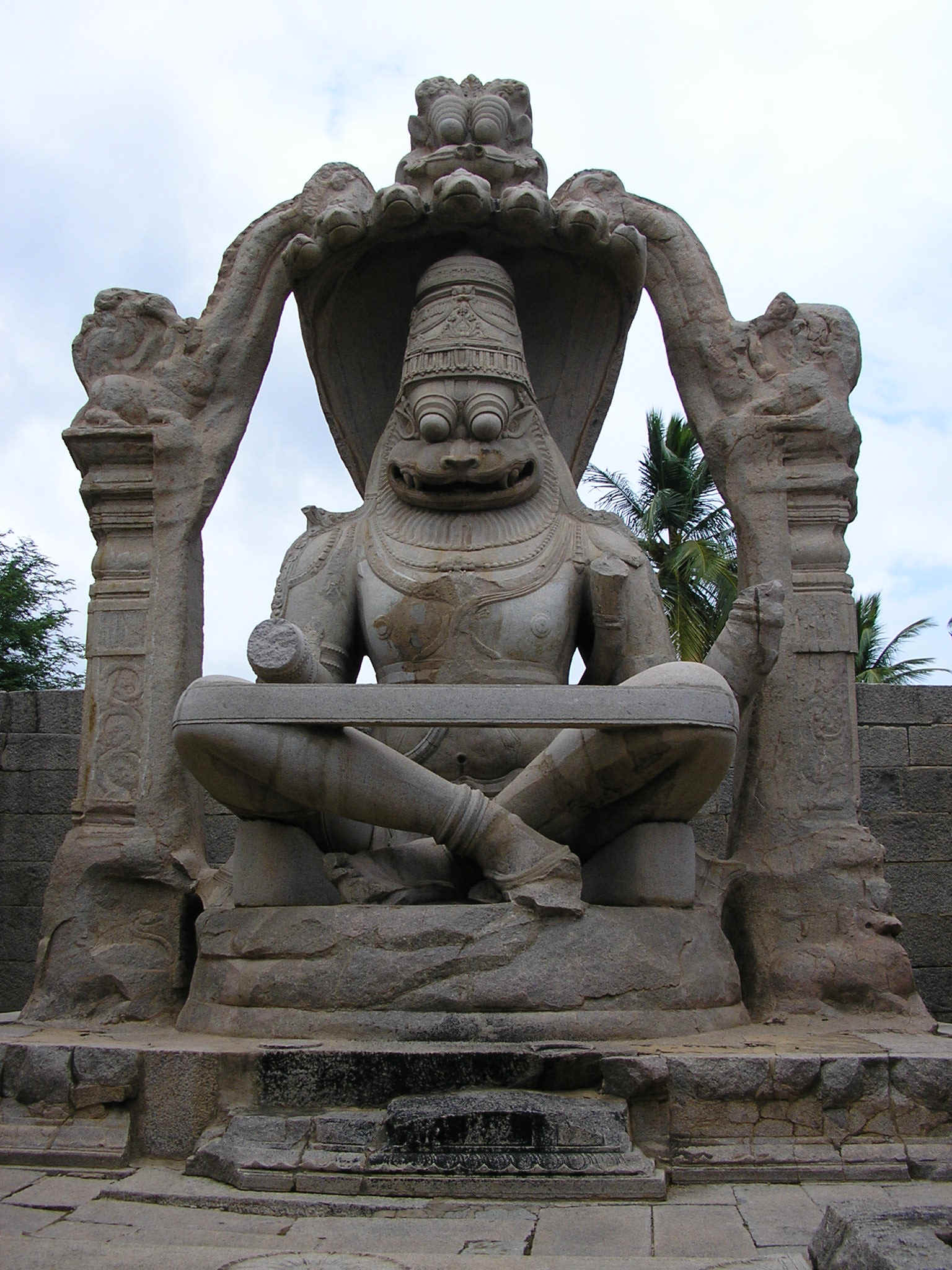
Ugra Narasimha monolith at Hampi

The defeat of the Jain Western Ganga Dynasty by the Cholas in the early 11th century and the rising numbers of followers of Vaishnava Hinduism and Virashaivism in the 12th century was mirrored by a decreased interest in Jainism. The conversion of the Hoysalas, originally Jains, to Vaishnavism around the 12th century, also contributed to this trend. However, the Vijayanagara kingdom saw the sustain of a sizeable Jain community, established on the Mysore plateau and the Canara coast, chiefly adhering to the Digambara tradition. Two notable locations of Jain worship in the Vijayanagara territory were Shravanabelagola and Kambadahalli.

Islamic contact with South India began as early as the seventh century, a result of trade between the Southern kingdoms and Arab lands. Jumma Masjids existed in the Rashtrakuta empire by the tenth century (Note: From the notes of Arab writer Al-Ishtakhri Nilakanta Sastri 1955, p. 396.) and many mosques flourished on the Malabar coast by the early 14th century. (Note: From the notes of Ibn Batuta Nilakanta Sastri 1955, p. 396.) Muslim settlers married local women; their children were known as Mappillas (Moplahs) and were actively involved in horse trading and manning shipping fleets. The interactions between the Vijayanagara Empire and the Bahmani Sultanate to the north increased the presence of Muslims in the south. Bringing on also a Persianate and Central Asian colouration to the local religious practices, with the growth of Hanafism and the rise of an urbanite Shia presence. In the early 15th century, Deva Raya built a mosque for the Muslims in Vijayanagara and placed a Quran before his throne.

The introduction of Christianity began as early as the eighth century as shown by the finding of copper plates inscribed with land grants to Malabar Christians, from the Syriac Orthodox tradition. Christian travelers wrote of the scarcity of Christians in South India in the Middle Ages, promoting its attractiveness to missionaries. (Note: From the notes of Jordanus in 1320–21 Nilakanta Sastri 1955, p. 397.) The arrival of the Portuguese in the 15th century and their connections through trade with the empire, the propagation of the Catholic faith by Francis Xavier (1545), peculiarly in areas of Lusitanian influence (Cochin, Goa, Madura), and later, to a lesser extent, the presence of Reformed Dutch settlements, fostered localised growth of Christianity in the south.

More restricted Jewish communities were also established along the Malabar coast, particularly in the surroundings of Cochin and Cranganore, at least from the 11th century. The commercial and colonial Portuguese expansion, coinciding with the anti-Jewish policies conducted in the Iberian Peninsula (Spain and Portugal), contributed to the migration of Marranos and Conversos towards the overseas territories, where their presence is attested in Goa in the 16th century. Judeo-Portuguese merchants were also recorded among the Europeans based in Vijayanagara city.

=== Epigraphs and monetization ===
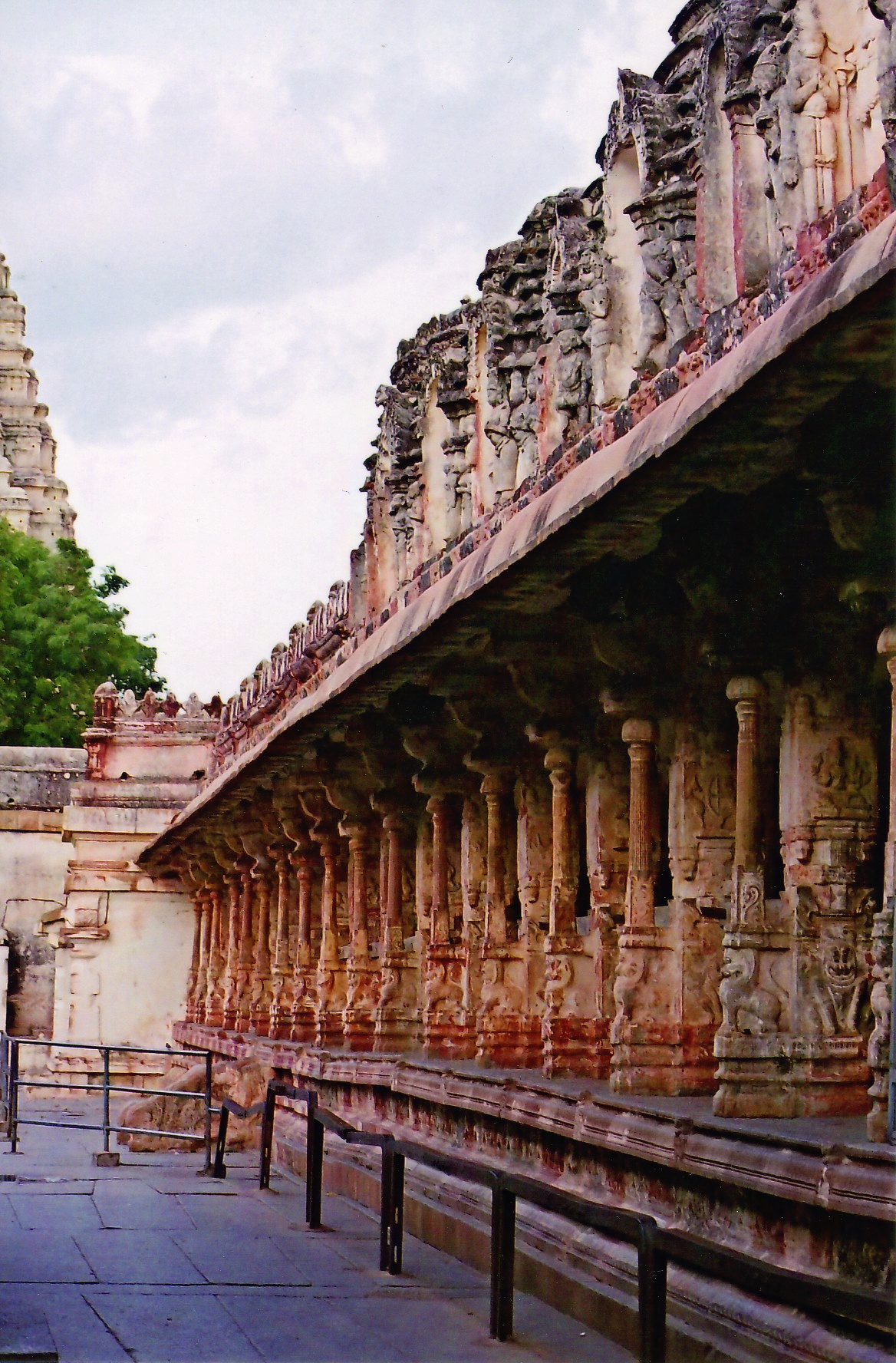
Ornate pillars, Virupaksha temple Hampi

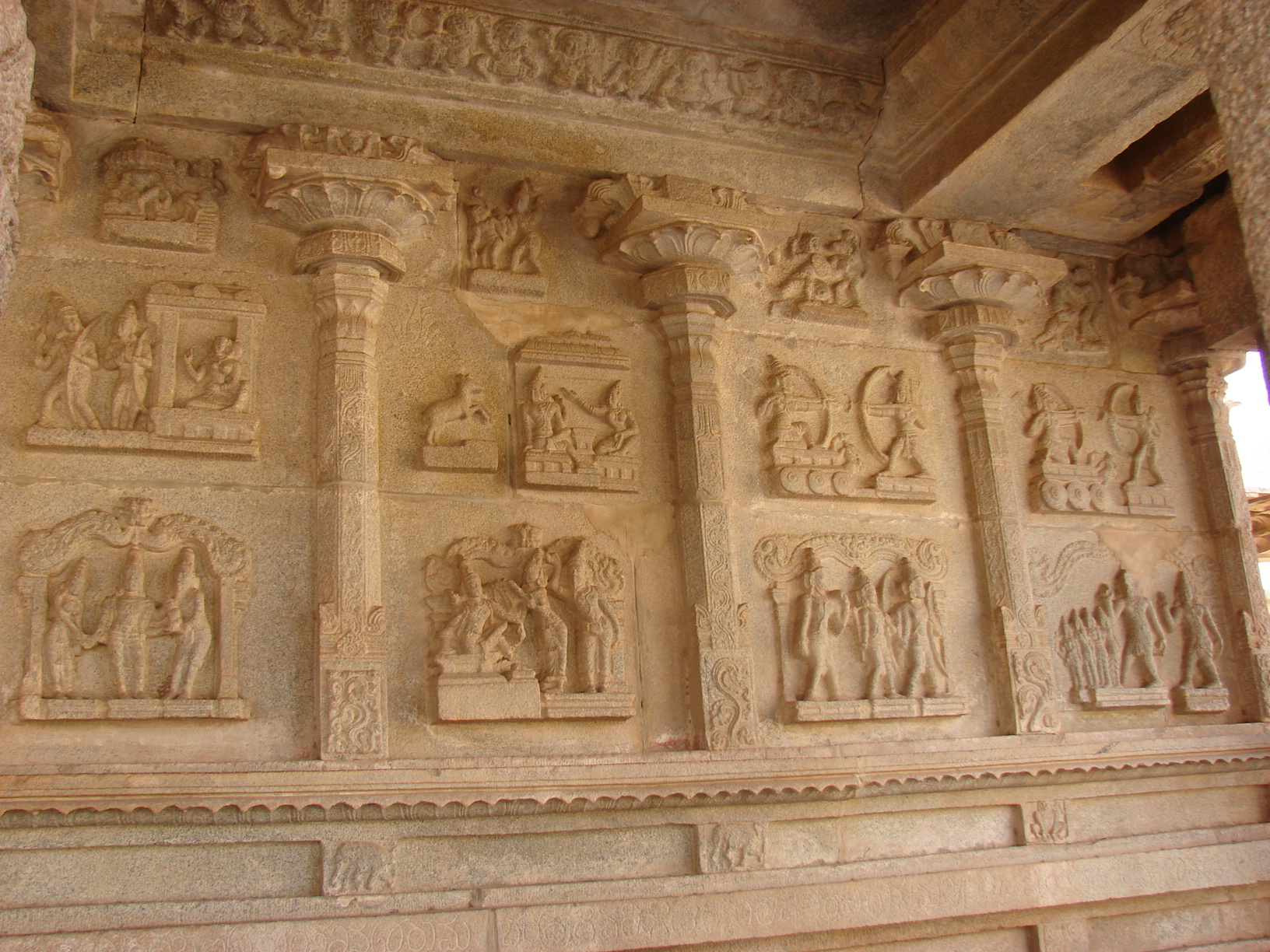
Wall panel relief in Hazare Rama Temple at Hampi

Stone inscriptions were the most common form of documents used on temple walls, boundary of properties and open places for public display. Another form of documentation was on copper plates that were meant for record keeping. Usually verbose inscriptions included information such as a salutation, a panegyric of the emperor or local ruler, the name of the donor, nature of the endowment (generally either cash or produce), the manner in which the grant would be used, obligations of the donee, share received by the donor and a concluding statement that officiated the entire donation and its obligations. Some inscriptions record an instance of victory in war or religious festival, and retribution or a curse on those who do not honor the grant.

Most Vijayanagara inscriptions recovered so far are in Kannada, Telugu and Tamil, and a few in Sanskrit. According to Suryanath U. Kamath about 7000 stone inscriptions, half of which are in Kannada, and about 300 copper plates which are mostly in Sanskrit, have been recovered. Bilingual inscriptions had lost favor by the 14th century. According to Mack, the majority of the inscriptions recovered are from the rule of the Tuluva dynasty (from 1503 to 1565) with the Saluva dynasty (from 1485 to 1503) inscribing the least in its brief control over the empire. The Sangama dynasty (from 1336 to 1485) which ruled the longest produced about one third of all epigraphs inscribed during the Tuluva period. Despite the popularity of Telugu language as a literary medium, the majority of the epigraphs in the language were inscribed in the limited period from 1500 to 1649. Talbot explains this scenario as one of shifting political solidarity. The Vijayanagara Empire was originally founded in Karnataka, with Andhra Pradesh serving as a province of the empire. After its defeat to the Deccan sultanates in 1565 and the sacking of the royal capital Vijayanagara, the diminished empire moved its capital to Southern Andhra Pradesh, creating an enterprise dominated by Telugu language.

The Persian visitor Abdur Razzak wrote in his travelogues that the empire enjoyed a high level of monetization. This is especially evident from the number of temple cash grants that were made. Coins were minted using gold, silver, copper and brass and their value depended on material weight. Coins were minted by the state, in the provinces and by merchant guilds. Foreign currency was in circulation. The highest denomination was the gold Varaha (or Hun/Honnu, Gadyana) weighted 50.65–53 grains. The Partab or Pratapa was valued at half a Varaha. The Fanam ( or Phanam, Hana), an alloy of gold and copper was the most common currency valued at a third of the Varaha. A Tar made of pure silver was a sixth of a Phanam and a Chital made of brass was a third of the Tar. Haga, Visa and Kasu were also coins of lower denominations.

=== Literature ===
During the rule of the Vijayanagara Empire, poets, scholars and philosophers wrote primarily in Kannada, Telugu and Sanskrit, and also in other regional languages such as Tamil and covered such subjects as religion, biography, Prabandha (fiction), music, grammar, poetry, medicine and mathematics. The administrative and court language of the empire was Kannada. However, Telugu language gained cultural and literary prominence during the reign of the last Vijayanagara emperors, especially Krishnadevaraya. (Note: Nagaraj 2003, p. 378, Asher & Talbot 2006, pp. 74–75: Royal patronage was also directed to the support of literature in several languages: Sanskrit (the pan-Indian literary language), Kannada (the language of the Vijayanagara home base in Karnataka), and Telugu (the language of Andhra). Works in all three languages were produced by poets assembled at the courts of the Vijayanagara kings [...] The Telugu language became particularly prominent in the ruling circles by the early 16th century, because of the large number of warrior lords who were either from Andhra or had served the kingdom there.)

Most Sanskrit works were commentaries either on the Vedas or on the Ramayana and Mahabharata epics, written by well known figures such as Sayanacharya (who wrote a treatise on the Vedas called Vedartha Prakasha whose English translation by Max Muller appeared in 1856), and Vidyaranya that extolled the superiority of the Advaita philosophy over other rival Hindu philosophies. Other writers were famous Dvaita saints of the Udupi order such as Jayatirtha (earning the title Tikacharya for his polemical writings), Vyasatirtha who wrote rebuttals to the Advaita philosophy and of the conclusions of earlier logicians, and Vadirajatirtha and Sripadaraya both of whom criticized the beliefs of Adi Sankara. Apart from these saints, noted Sanskrit scholars adorned the courts of the Vijayanagara kings and their feudal chiefs. Some members of the royal family were writers of merit and authored important works such as Jambavati Kalyana by Emperor Krishnadevaraya, and Madura Vijayam (also known as Veerakamparaya Charita) by Princess Gangadevi, a daughter-in-law of Emperor Bukka I, dwells on the conquest of the Madurai Sultanate by the Vijayanagara Empire.

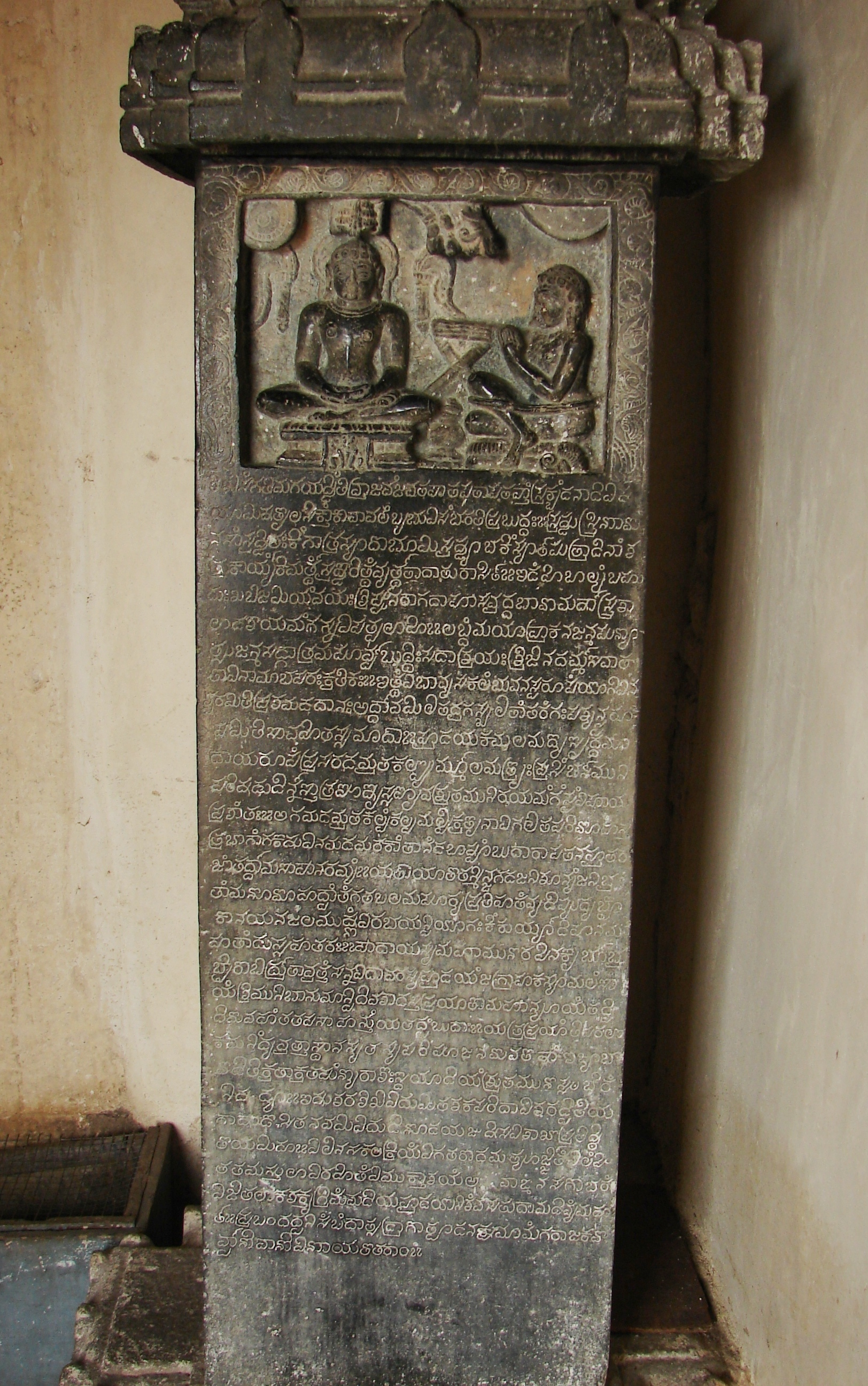
Poetic inscription in Kannada by Vijayanagara poet Manjaraja (c. 1398)

The Kannada poets and scholars of the empire produced important writings supporting the Vaishnava Bhakti movement heralded by the Haridasas (devotees of Vishnu), Brahminical and Veerashaiva (Lingayatism) literature. The Haridasa poets celebrated their devotion through songs called Devaranama (lyrical poems) in the native meters of Sangatya (quatrain), Suladi (beat based), Ugabhoga (melody based) and Mundige (cryptic). (Note: Ayyappapanicker in Shiva Prakash 1997, pp. 164, 193–194, 203) Their inspirations were the teachings of Madhvacharya and Vyasatirtha. Purandaradasa and Kanakadasa are considered the foremost among many Dasas (devotees) by virtue of their immense contribution. Kumara Vyasa, the most notable of Brahmin scholars wrote Gadugina Bharata, a translation of the epic Mahabharata. This work marks a transition of Kannada literature from old Kannada to modern Kannada. Chamarasa was a famous Veerashaiva scholar and poet who had many debates with Vaishnava scholars in the court of Devaraya II. His Prabhulinga Leele, later translated into Telugu and Tamil, was a eulogy of Saint Allama Prabhu (the saint was considered an incarnation of Lord Ganapathi while Parvati took the form of a princess of Banavasi).

At this peak of Telugu literature, the most famous writing in the Prabandha style was Manucharitamu. Emperor Krishnadevaraya was an accomplished Telugu scholar and wrote the Amuktamalyada, (Note: According to Nilakanta Sastri 1955, p. 372, during the rule of Krishnadevaraya, encouragement was given to the creation of original Prabandhas (stories) from Puranic themes.) a story of the wedding of the god Vishnu to Andal, the Tamil Alvar saint poet and the daughter of Periyalvar at Srirangam. In his court were eight famous scholars regarded as the pillars (Ashtadiggajas) of the literary assembly. The most famous among them were Allasani Peddana who held the honorific Andhrakavitapitamaha (lit, "father of Telugu poetry") and Tenali Ramakrishna who authored several notable works. The other six poets were Nandi Thimmana (Mukku Timmana), Ayyalaraju Ramabhadra, Madayyagari Mallana, Bhattu Murthi (Ramaraja Bhushana), Pingali Surana, and Dhurjati. Srinatha, who wrote books such as Marutratcharitamu and Salivahana-sapta-sati, was patronised by Emperor Devaraya II and enjoyed the same status as important ministers in the court.

Most Tamil literature from this period came from Tamil-speaking regions, which were ruled by the feudatory Pandya who gave particular attention to the cultivation of Tamil literature. Although Kannada, Telugu, and Sanskrit dominated the courtly and administrative functions of the empire, Tamil literature also thrived, especially in the southern regions ruled by the Vijayanagara Empire. Many Tamil poets and scholars were patronized by both the kings and regional feudatories. Tamil literature during this period was primarily devotional, reflecting the continuing influence of the Bhakti movement. Both Shaiva and Vaishnava traditions were supported, with temples like Srirangam playing a central role in the propagation of Tamil religious texts. Krishnadevaraya, in particular, was known for his support of Tamil Vaishnava literature. The Vaishnava poet Haridasa composed the Irusamaya Vilakkam, a comparative study of Shaivism and Vaishnavism, highlighting the preference for Vaishnava philosophy under the king's patronage. Other significant Tamil scholars included Svarupananda Desikar, who wrote the Sivaprakasap-perundirattu, an anthology of verses on Advaita philosophy, and his pupil Tattuvarayar, who composed Kurundirattu, a shorter anthology of verses. Additionally, Tamil literature during this period included devotional hymns in praise of Alvars and Nayanmars. Texts such as the Divya Prabandham and Tevaram continued to be revered and performed in temples under the auspices of the empire.

Notable among secular writings on music and medicine were Vidyaranya's Sangitsara, Praudha Raya's Ratiratnapradipika, Sayana's Ayurveda Sudhanidhi and Lakshmana Pandita's Vaidyarajavallabham. The Kerala school of astronomy and mathematics flourished during this period with scholars such as Madhava, who made important contributions to trigonometry and calculus, and Nilakantha Somayaji, who postulated on the orbitals of planets.

=== Architecture ===
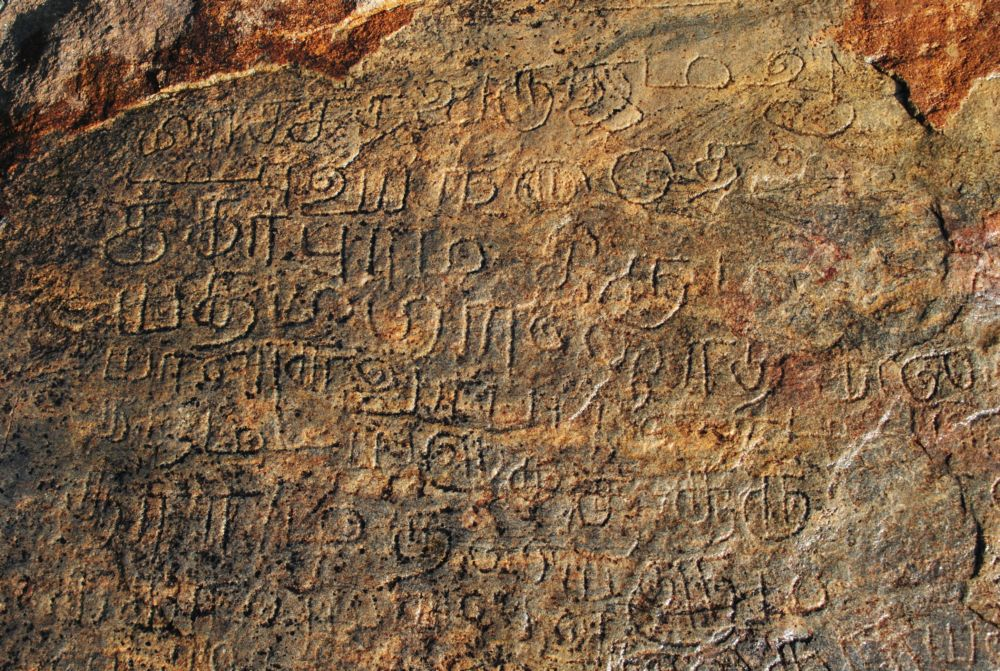
Tamil inscription of Krishnadevaraya, Severappoondi

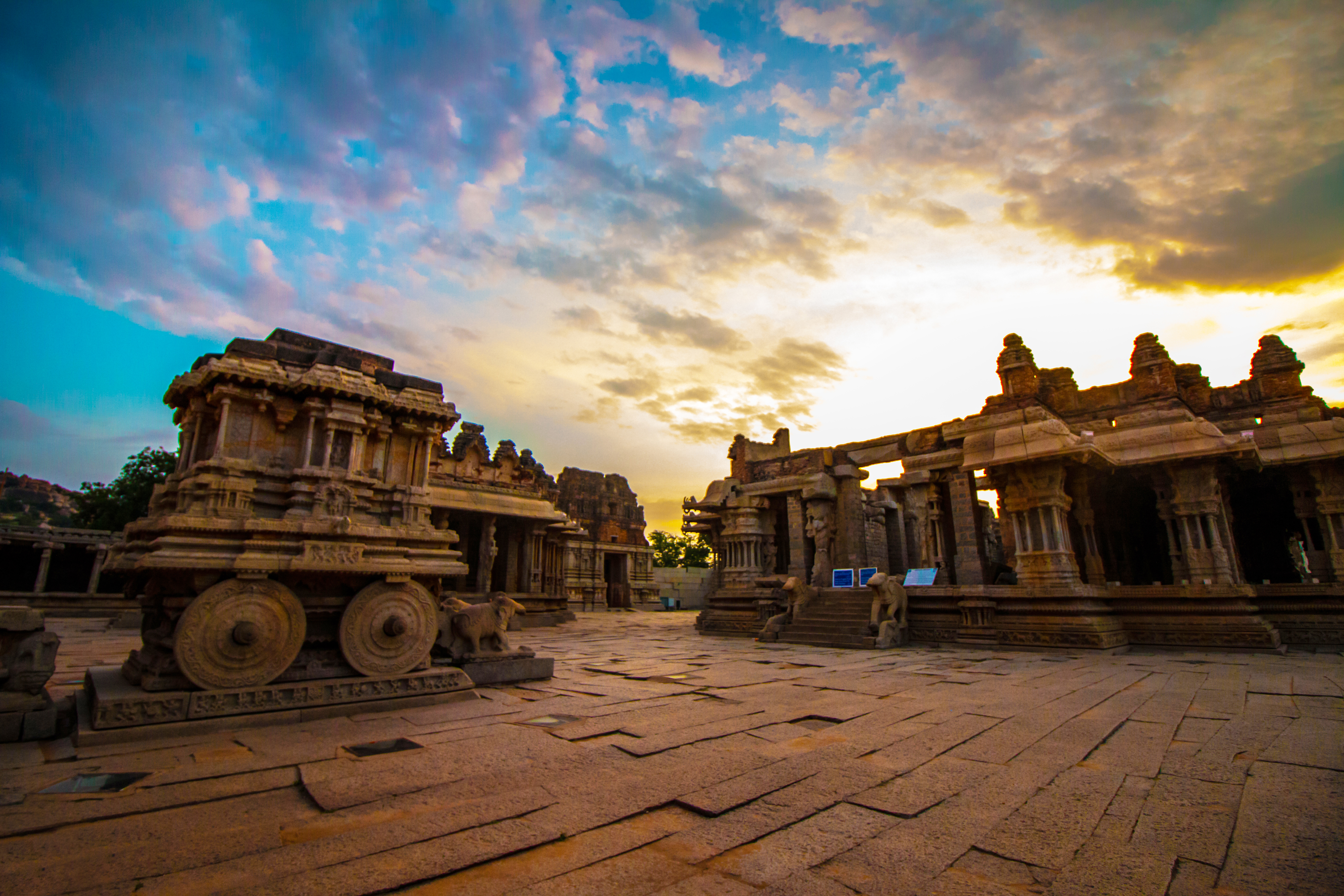
Temple car at the Vittala temple in Hampi

Vijayanagara architecture, according to art critic Percy Brown is a vibrant combination and blossoming of the Chalukya, Hoysala, Pandya and Chola styles, idioms that prospered in previous centuries. Its legacy of sculpture, architecture and painting influenced the development of the arts long after the empire came to an end. Its stylistic hallmark is the ornate pillared Kalyanamantapa (marriage hall), Vasanthamantapa (open pillared halls) and the Rayagopura (tower). Artisans used the locally available hard granite because of its durability since the empire was under constant threat of invasion. An open-air theatre of monuments at its capital at Vijayanagara is a UNESCO World Heritage Site.

In the 14th century, the kings continued to build vesara or Deccan-style monuments but later incorporated Dravida-style gopuras to meet their ritualistic needs. The Prasanna Virupaksha temple (underground temple) of Bukka and the Hazare Rama temple of Deva Raya are examples of Deccan architecture. The varied and intricate ornamentation of the pillars is a mark of their work. (Note: Nilakanta Sastri about the importance of pillars in the Vijayanagara style in Kamath 2001, p. 183) At Hampi, the Vitthala and Hazara Ramaswamy temples are examples of their pillared Kalyanamantapa style. A visible aspect of their style is their return to the simplistic and serene art developed by the Chalukya dynasty. The Vitthala temple took several decades to complete during the reign of the Tuluva kings.

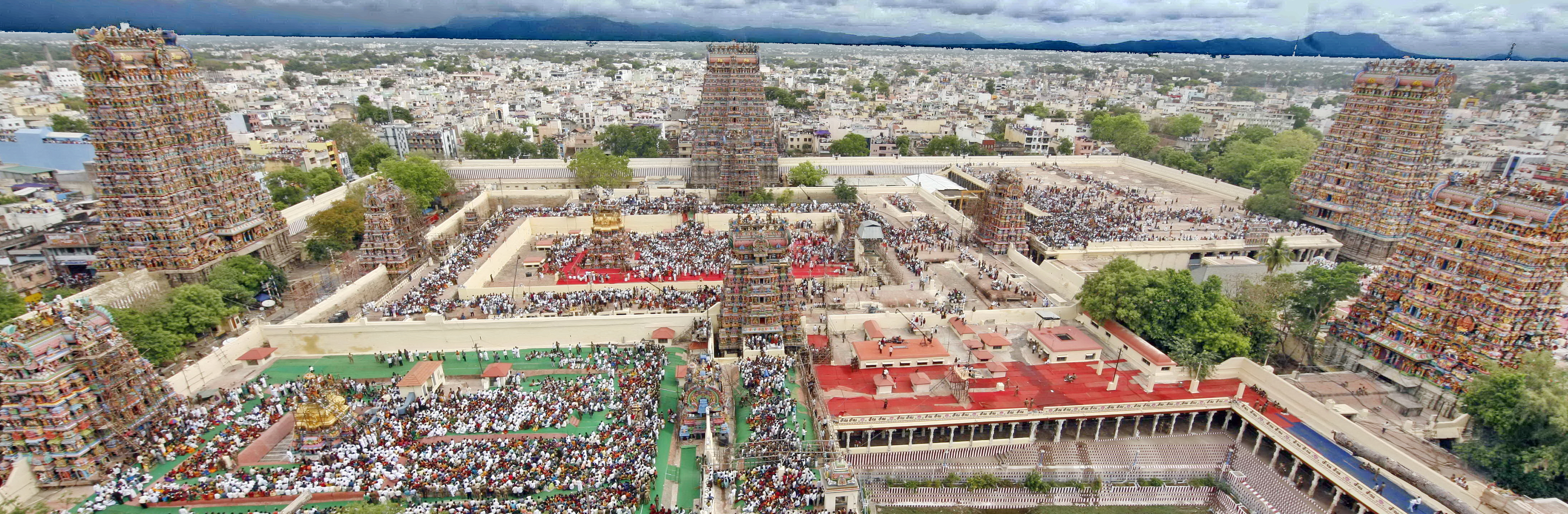
Aerial view of the Meenakshi Temple, Madurai. The temple was rebuilt by the Nayaks rulers under the Vijayanagara Empire.

Another element of the Vijayanagara style is the carving and consecration of large monoliths such as the Sasivekaalu (mustard) Ganesha and Kadalekaalu (ground nut) Ganesha at Hampi, the Gommateshwara (Bahubali) monoliths in Karkala and Venur, and the Nandi bull in Lepakshi. The Vijayanagara temples of Kolar, Kanakagiri, Sringeri and other towns of Karnataka; the temples of Tadpatri, Lepakshi, Ahobilam, Tirumala Venkateswara Temple and Srikalahasti in Andhra Pradesh; and the temples of Vellore, Kumbakonam, Kanchi and Srirangam in Tamil Nadu are examples of this style. Vijayanagara art includes wall-paintings such as the Dashavatara and Girijakalyana (marriage of Parvati, Shiva's consort) in the Virupaksha Temple at Hampi, the Shivapurana murals (tales of Shiva) at the Virabhadra temple at Lepakshi, and those at the Kamaakshi and Varadaraja temples at Kanchi. This mingling of the South Indian styles resulted in a new idiom of art not seen in earlier centuries, a focus on reliefs in addition to sculpture differing from that previously in India.

An aspect of Vijayanagara architecture that shows the cosmopolitanism of the great city is the presence of many secular structures bearing Islamic features. While political history concentrates on the ongoing conflict between the Vijayanagara Empire and the Deccan sultanates, the architectural record reflects a more creative interaction. There are many arches, domes and vaults that show these influences. The concentration of structures like pavilions, stables and towers suggests they were for use by royalty. The decorative details of these structures may have been absorbed into Vijayanagara architecture during the early 15th century, coinciding with the rule of Deva Raya I and Deva Raya II. These kings are known to have employed many Muslims in their army and court, some of whom may have been Muslim architects. This harmonious exchange of architectural ideas must have happened during rare periods of peace between the Hindu and Muslim kingdoms. The "Great Platform" (Mahanavami Dibba) has relief carvings in which the figures seem to have the facial features of central Asian Turks who were known to have been employed as royal attendants.

=== Festivals and court ceremony ===
Festival life at Vijayanagara brought together religion, kingship and public spectacle. The Mahanavami celebrations included worship of the state horse, sacrifices of buffaloes and other animals, dancing, wrestling and processions of decorated horses, elephants, chariots and soldiers. Subordinate rulers and nayakas presented gifts and tribute before the king, who reviewed their armies on the final day. Mahanavami thus became one of the principal public ceremonies through which royal authority was displayed.

The tradition survived in states that emerged from the Vijayanagara political world. Navaratri remained an important royal ritual among its successor states, while Raja Wodeyar I celebrated Dasara at Srirangapatna in 1610. The festival subsequently became a defining ceremony of the Mysore court and developed into the modern Mysore Dasara.

Temple festivals were similarly expanded through imperial patronage. The Brahmotsavam at Tirumala long predated Vijayanagara, but successive rulers added new celebrations and endowments. In 1513, Krishnadevaraya endowed three villages for an additional annual Brahmotsavam in the Tamil month of Thai. Later inscriptions record as many as eleven Brahmotsavams in some years during the late Vijayanagara period. Vijayanagara's influence therefore lay less in creating these traditions than in expanding their resources, frequency and royal visibility.

== Travellers and sources ==
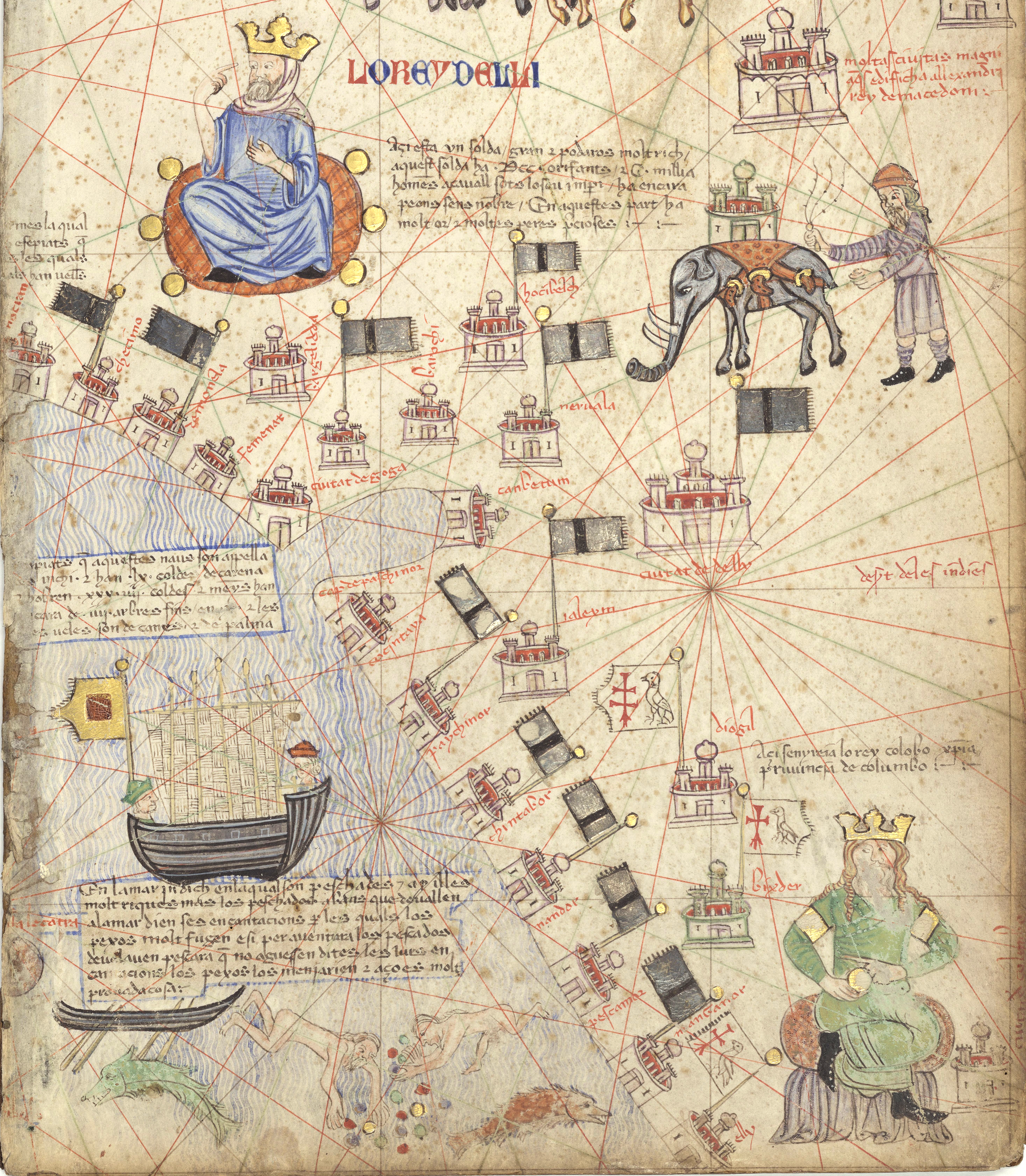
Sultan of Delhi (top, flag:) and Emperor of Vijayanagara (bottom, with "Christian" flag:), named as "King of Colombo" after the city of Kollam. His caption reads: Here rules the king of Colombo, a Christian. He was mistakenly identified as Christian because of the Christian mission established in Kollam by Jordanus since 1329. Detail of the Catalan Atlas of 1375.

The sources of Vijayanagara history (its origin, social and political life and eventual defeat) are the accounts of foreign travelers and contemporary literary sources in Sanskrit, Kannada, Persian and Telugu. The Portuguese visitors to the empire were Domingo Paes (1522), Fernão Nunes (1537), Duarte Barbosa (1516) and Barradas (1616). Afanasy Nikitin (1470) came from Russia, while Niccolò de' Conti (1420), Ludovico di Varthema (1505), Caesar Fredericci (1567) and Filippo Sassetti (1585) were travelers from Italy and Abdul Razzaq (1443) from Persia. Contemporary Muslim writers who were either under the patronage of rival kingdoms (the Deccan sultanates) or were visitors to Vijayanagara and accomplished valuable works are Ziauddin Barani (Tarikh-i-Firuz Shahi, 1357), Isamy (Fatuhat us salatin), Syed Ali Tabatabai (Burhan-i-Maisar, 1596), Nisammuddin Bakshi, Firishta (Tarik-i-Firishta) and Rafiuddin Shirazi (Tazkirat ul Mulk, 1611). Among writings by native authors, the important Sanskrit works that shed light on the empire are Vidyaranya Kalajnana, Dindima's Ramabhyudayam on the life of Emperor Saluva Narasimha, Dindima II's Achyutabhyudayam and Tirumalamba's Varadambika Parinayam. Among Kannada literary works, Kumara Ramana Kathe by Nanjunda Kavi, Mohanatarangini by Kanakadasa, Keladiripavijayam by Linganna and the recently discovered Krishnadevarayana Dinachari are useful sources, and among Telugu works, Srinatha's Kashikanda, Mallayya and Singayya's Varahapuranamu, Vishvanatha Nayani's Rayavachakamu, Nandi Timmanna's Parijathapaharanamu, Durjati's Krishnaraja Vijayamu, Peddanna's Manucharitamu and Emperor Krishnadevaraya's Amuktamalyada are important sources of information.

In the memoirs of Niccolò de' Conti, an Italian merchant and traveller who visited Hampi about 1420, the city had an estimated circumference of 60 miles (97 km) and it enclosed agriculture and settlements in its fortifications. In 1442, Abdul Razzaq described it as a city with seven layers of forts, with outer layers for agriculture, crafts and residence, the inner third to seventh layers very crowded with shops and bazaars.

In 1520, Domingo Paes, a Portuguese traveller, visited Vijayanagara as a part of trade contingent from Portuguese Goa. He wrote his memoir as Chronica dos reis de Bisnaga, in which he stated Vijayanagara was "as large as Rome, and very beautiful to the sight ... the best provided city in the world". According to Paes, "there are many groves within it, in the gardens of the houses, many conduits of water which flow into the midst of it, and in places there are lakes ...".

Cesare Federici, an Italian merchant and traveller, visited a few decades after the 1565 defeat and collapse of the Vijayanagara Empire. According to Sinopoli, Johansen, and Morrison, Federici described it as a very different city. He wrote, "the citie of Bezeneger (Hampi-Vijayanagara) is not altogether destroyed, yet the houses stand still, but emptie, and there is dwelling in them nothing, as is reported, but Tygres and other wild beasts".

The historian Will Durant, in his Our Oriental Heritage: The Story of Civilization recites the story of Vijayanagara and calls its conquest and destruction a discouraging tale. He writes, "its evident moral is that civilization is a precarious thing, whose delicate complex of order and liberty, culture and peace" may at any time be overthrown by war and ferocious violence. (Note: Hampi's history, ruins and temples made it an early site for offbeat tourism in the 1960s and after. Tourists would gather on its hills and midst its ruins, to hold parties and spiritual retreats, and these have been called "Hampi Hippies" and Hampi as the "lost city" in some publications.)

== List of rulers ==
=== Sangama dynasty (1336–1485) ===
Serial no.	Regnal names	Reign
1	Harihara I	1336–1356
2	Bukka Raya I	1356–1377
3	Harihara II	1377–1404
4	Virupaksha Raya	1404–1405
5	Bukka Raya II	1405–1406
6	Deva Raya	1406–1422
7	Ramachandra Raya	1422
8	Vira Vijaya Bukka Raya	1422–1424
9	Deva Raya II	1424–1446
10	Mallikarjuna Raya	1446–1465
11	Virupaksha Raya II	1465–1485
12	Praudha Raya	1485

=== Saluva dynasty (1485–1505) ===
Serial no.	Regnal names	Reign
13	Saluva Narasimha Deva Raya	1485–1491
14	Thimma Bhupala	1491
15	Narasimha Raya II	1491–1505

=== Tuluva dynasty (1491–1570) ===
Serial no.	Regnal names	Reign
16	Tuluva Narasa Nayaka	1491–1503
17	Viranarasimha Raya	1503–1509
18	Krishnadevaraya	1509–1529
19	Achyuta Deva Raya	1529–1542
20	Venkata I	1542
21	Sadasiva Raya	1542–1570

=== Aravidu dynasty (1542–1646) ===
Serial no.	Regnal names	Reign
22	Aliya Rama Raya	1542–1565
23	Tirumala Deva Raya	1565–1572
24	Sriranga I	1572–1586
25	Venkata II	1586–1614
26	Sriranga II	1614
27	Rama Deva Raya	1617–1632
28	Venkata III	1632–1642
29	Sriranga III	1642–1646/1678

== In popular culture ==
- Vijayanagara is a key inspiration for the fictional city and empire of Bisnaga in Salman Rushdie's 2023 novel Victory City.
- Vijayanagara during the rule of Krishnadevaraya is depicted in the 1951 film Malliswari.

== See also ==
- History of India
- History of South India
- Political history of medieval Karnataka
- Vijayanagara military

== Sources ==
- Asher, Catherine B.; Talbot, Cynthia (2006). "Creation of Pan South Indian Culture". India Before Europe. Cambridge: Cambridge University Press. ISBN 978-0-521-00539-5.
- Bang, Peter Fibiger; Kolodziejczyk, Dariusz, eds. (2012). "Ideologies of state building in Vijayanagara India". Universal Empire: A Comparative Approach to Imperial Culture and Representation in Eurasian History. Cambridge University Press. ISBN 978-1-107-02267-6. Archived from the original on 22 August 2024.
- Chopra, P. N.; Ravindran, T. K.; Subrahmanian, N. (2003). "Medieval Period". History of South India. New Delhi: Rajendra Ravindra Printers. ISBN 81-219-0153-7.
- Dallapiccola, Anna L. (2001). "Relief carvings on the great platform". In Fritz, John M.; Michell, George (eds.). New Light on Hampi: Recent Research at Vijayanagara. Mumbai: MARG. ISBN 978-81-85026-53-4.
- Davison-Jenkins, Dominic J. (2001). "The Greater Metropolitan Region". In Fritz, John M.; Michell, George (eds.). New Light on Hampi: Recent Research at Vijayanagara. Mumbai: MARG. ISBN 978-81-85026-53-4.

Devi, Ganga (1924). Sastri, G Harihara; Sastri, V. Srinivasa (eds.). Madhura Vijaya (or Veerakamparaya Charita): An Historical Kavya. Trivandrum, British India: Sridhara Power Press.

- Dhere, Ramchandra (2011). Rise of a Folk God: Vitthal of Pandharpur South Asia Research. Oxford University Press. ISBN 978-0199777648.
- Durga Prasad, J. (1988). History of the Andhras up to 1565 A. D. (PDF). Guntur: P.G. Publisher. Archived from the original (PDF) on 22 April 2006.
- Eaton, Richard M. (2006). A Social History of the Deccan, 1300-1761 : Eight Indian Lives. Cambridge: Cambridge University Press. ISBN 978-0-521-71627-7. OCLC 226973152.
- Fritz, John M.; Michell, George (2001). "Introduction". New Light on Hampi: Recent Research at Vijayanagara. Mumbai: MARG. ISBN 978-81-85026-53-4.
- Goodding, Robert A. (2013), "A Theologian in a South Indian Kingdom: The Historical Context of the Jivanmuktiviveka of Vidyaranya", in Lindquist, Steven E. (ed.), Religion and Identity in South Asia and Beyond: Essays in Honor of Patrick Olivelle, Anthem Press, ISBN 978-0-85728-790-8
- Iyer, Panchapakesa A.S. (2006). Karnataka Sangeeta Sastra. Chennai: Zion Printers. Archived from the original on 22 August 2024.
- Jackson, William (2016). "Reflections on Vidyaranya and the 'Hinduness' of Islamicate Vijayanagara". Vijayanagara Voices: Exploring South Indian History and Hindu Literature. New York: Routledge. ISBN 9780-7546-3950-3.
- Kamath, Suryanath U. (2001) [1980]. A concise history of Karnataka: from pre-historic times to the present. Bangalore: Jupiter books. LCCN 80905179. OCLC 7796041.
- Karmarkar, A.P. (1947). Cultural history of Karnataka: ancient and medieval. Dharwad: Karnataka Vidyavardhaka Sangha. OCLC 8221605.
- Kulke, Hermann; Rothermund, Dietmar (2004). A History of India (4th ed.). Routledge. ISBN 978-0-415-32919-4. Archived from the original on 8 September 2025.
- Mack, Alexandra (2001). "The temple district of Vitthalapura". In John M. Fritz; George Michell (eds.). New Light on Hampi: Recent Research at Vijayanagara. Mumbai: MARG. ISBN 978-81-85026-53-4.
- Mack, Alexandra (2002). "Vijayanagara Inscriptions as History and Archeology". Spiritual Journey, Imperial City: Pilgrimage to the temples of Vijayanagara. New Delhi: Vedams. ISBN 81-7936-004-0. Archived from the original on 22 August 2024.
- Nagaraj, D.R. (2003). "Tensions in Kannada Literary Culture". In Pollock, Sheldon (ed.). Literary Cultures in History: Reconstructions from South Asia. Berkeley and Los Angeles: University of California. ISBN 978-0-520-22821-4. Archived from the original on 1 October 2025.
- Narayan, M.K.V. (2010). Lyrical Musings on Indian Culture: A Sociological Study of the Songs of Sant Purandaradasa. New Delhi: Readworthy. ISBN 978-93-80009-31-5. Archived from the original on 18 September 2023.
- Nilakanta Sastri, K. A. (1955) [reissued 2002]. A History of South India: From Prehistoric Times to the Fall of Vijayanagar. New Delhi: Indian Branch, Oxford University Press. ISBN 978-0-19-560686-7.
- Philon, Helen (2001). "Plaster decoration on Sultanate-styled courtly buildings". In Fritz, John M.; Michell, George (eds.). New Light on Hampi: Recent Research at Vijayanagara. Mumbai: MARG. ISBN 978-81-85026-53-4.
- Pillai, Manu S. (2020). Rebel Sultans:The Deccan from Khilji to Shivaji. New Delhi: Juggernaut Books. pp. 116–118. ISBN 978-9353451066.
- Pollock, Sheldon (1993). "Ramayana and Political Imagination in India". The Journal of Asian Studies. 52 (2). Cambridge University Press: 261–297. doi:10.2307/2059648. JSTOR 2059648. S2CID 154215656.
- Ramaswamy, Vijaya (2007). Historical Dictionary of the Tamils. Scarecrow Press. ISBN 978-0-8108-6445-0.
- Raychaudhuri, Tapan; Habib, Irfan; Kumar, Dharma (1982). The Cambridge Economic History of India: Volume 1, c. 1200–c. 1750. Cambridge University Press. ISBN 978-0-521-22692-9.
- Rice, B. Lewis (2001) [1897]. Mysore Gazetteer Compiled for Government. Vol. 1. New Delhi, Madras: Asian Educational Services. ISBN 978-81-206-0977-8.
- Sattar, Mofarahus; Sharma, S.D.; Pokharia, Anil K. (2010). Sharma, D.S. (ed.). Rice: Origin, Antiquity and History. Boca Raton, Florida: Science Publishers, CRC Press. ISBN 978-1-4398-4056-6. Archived from the original on 22 August 2024.
- Savile, Charles (1996). "vol 5, Asia & Oceania". In Schellinger, Paul E.; Salkin, Robert M. (eds.). International Dictionary of Historical Places. New York: Routledge. ISBN 1-884964-04-4.
- Sen, Sailendra (2013). A Textbook of Medieval Indian History. Primus Books. pp. 103–106. ISBN 978-93-80607-34-4.
- Shiva Prakash, H.S. (1997). "Kannada". In Ayyappapanicker (ed.). Medieval Indian Literature: An Anthology. Sahitya Akademi. ISBN 978-81-260-0365-5.
- Sewell, Robert (2011) [First published 1901]. A Forgotten Empire (Vijayanagar). New Delhi: Asian Educational Services. ISBN 978-8120601253.
- Sinopoli, Carla M.; Morrison, Kathleen D. (2001). "Hydraulic works". In Fritz, John M.; Michell, George (eds.). New Light on Hampi: Recent Research at Vijayanagara. Mumbai: MARG. ISBN 978-81-85026-53-4.
- Sinopoli, Carla M. (2003). The Political Economy of Craft Production Crafting Empire in South India, c. 1350–1650. Cambridge University Press. ISBN 978-1139440745. Archived from the original on 22 August 2024.
- Stein, Burton (1989). The New Cambridge History of India: Vijayanagara. Cambridge University Press. ISBN 978-0-521-26693-2.
- Thapar, Romila (2003). The Penguin History of Early India. New Delhi: Penguin Books. ISBN 978-0-14-302989-2.
- Talbot, Cynthia (2002). Precolonial India in Practice: Society, Region and Identity in Medieval Andhra. New York: Oxford University Press. ISBN 0-19-513661-6.
- Vanina, Eugenia (2012). Medieval Indian Mindscapes – Space. Time. Society. Man. Delhi: Primus Books. ISBN 978-93-80607-19-1.
- Verghese, Anila (2001). "Memorial stones". In Fritz, John M.; Michell, George (eds.). New Light on Hampi: Recent Research at Vijayanagara. Mumbai: MARG. ISBN 978-81-85026-53-4.
- Wagoner, Phillip (2001). "Architecture and Royal Authority under the Early Sangamas". In John M. Fritz; George Michell (eds.). New Light on Hampi: Recent Research at Vijayanagara. Mumbai: MARG. ISBN 978-81-85026-53-4.
