= Yusuf Adil Shah's invasion of Vijayanagara =

Conflict in India

- Part of Deccani–Vijayanagar wars
Date	1505
Location	Kurnool, Adoni, Andhra Pradesh, India
Result	Vijayanagara Empire victory

Belligerents
Vijayanagar Empire	Bijapur Sultanate

Commanders and leaders
Viranarasimha Raya; Aravidu Rama Raja I Aravidu Thimma	Yusuf Adil Shah; Kasappa Odaya (POW)

Yusuf Adil Shah's invasion of Vijayanagara (1505) was a conflict between the Vijayanagara Empire and the Bijapur Sultanate. The invasion led by Yusuf Adil Shah in alliance with governor of Adavani Kasappa Odaya met with strong resistance from the Vijayanagara army, led by Aravidu Rama Raja I and his son Aravidu Chinna Thimma. Aravidu Rama Raja I and his son Chinna Thimma defeated Yusuf Adil Shah in the battles of Kandanavolu and Adavani forcing him to retreat.

== Background ==
=== Assassination of Narasimha Raya II ===
After the death of Tuluva Narasa Nayaka his eldest son, Viranarasimha Raya, succeeded him as the regent of the Vijayanagara kingdom. Although the rightful king, Narasimha Raya II had come of age and was capable of ruling independently, Viranarasimha Raya showed no intention of relinquishing power. Instead, he sought to eliminate the king and seize the throne for himself. Viewing Narasimha Raya II as an obstacle to his ambitions, he had him assassinated in the fort of Penugonda where he had been confined, and declared himself king in A.D. 1505. Narasimha Raya II's life was marked by misfortune the deaths of his father Saluva Narasimha I and elder brother Thimma Bhupala left him vulnerable to the schemes of ambitious men who ultimately orchestrated his downfall. Despite his resistance, he remained powerless against the forces that sought his end, leading to his imprisonment and eventual death. His demise brought an end to the brief rule of the Saluva dynasty.

=== Rebellions Against Vira Narasimha Raya ===
Viranarasimha Raya ruled Vijayanagara for five years, during which the kingdom experienced significant turmoil. His ascent to the throne faced strong opposition, leading to widespread revolts by the nobles. However, he managed to suppress most of these rebellions and forced the nobles to recognize his authority. Although the records do not provide a complete list of his defeated enemies, inscriptions and contemporary Telugu literature mention some of the most significant adversaries he overcame.

Kacha or Kasappa Udaiya, the chief of Adavani (Adoni), held authority over a vast region extending from Adavani on the Tungabhadra to Penugonda in the Anantapur district. While he was not a significant threat on his own, his alliance with Yusuf Adil Shah and potential support from the rebellious Polygars of Ummattur made him a formidable adversary. Since his treacherous attack on Tuluva Narasa Nayaka in 1490, Yusuf Adil Khan had been striving to bring the Krishna-Tungabhadra doab under his control. At his urging, the Bahmani king Mahmood Shah Bahmani II convinced his nobles to launch a religious war against Vijayanagara. The first jihad, known as the Compact of Bidar took place in 1502, the final year of Tuluva Narasa Nayaka’s regency. Facing little resistance, Mahmud Shah successfully conquered the doab including the key strongholds of Raichur and Mudgal and granted the captured territory to Yusuf Adil Khan.

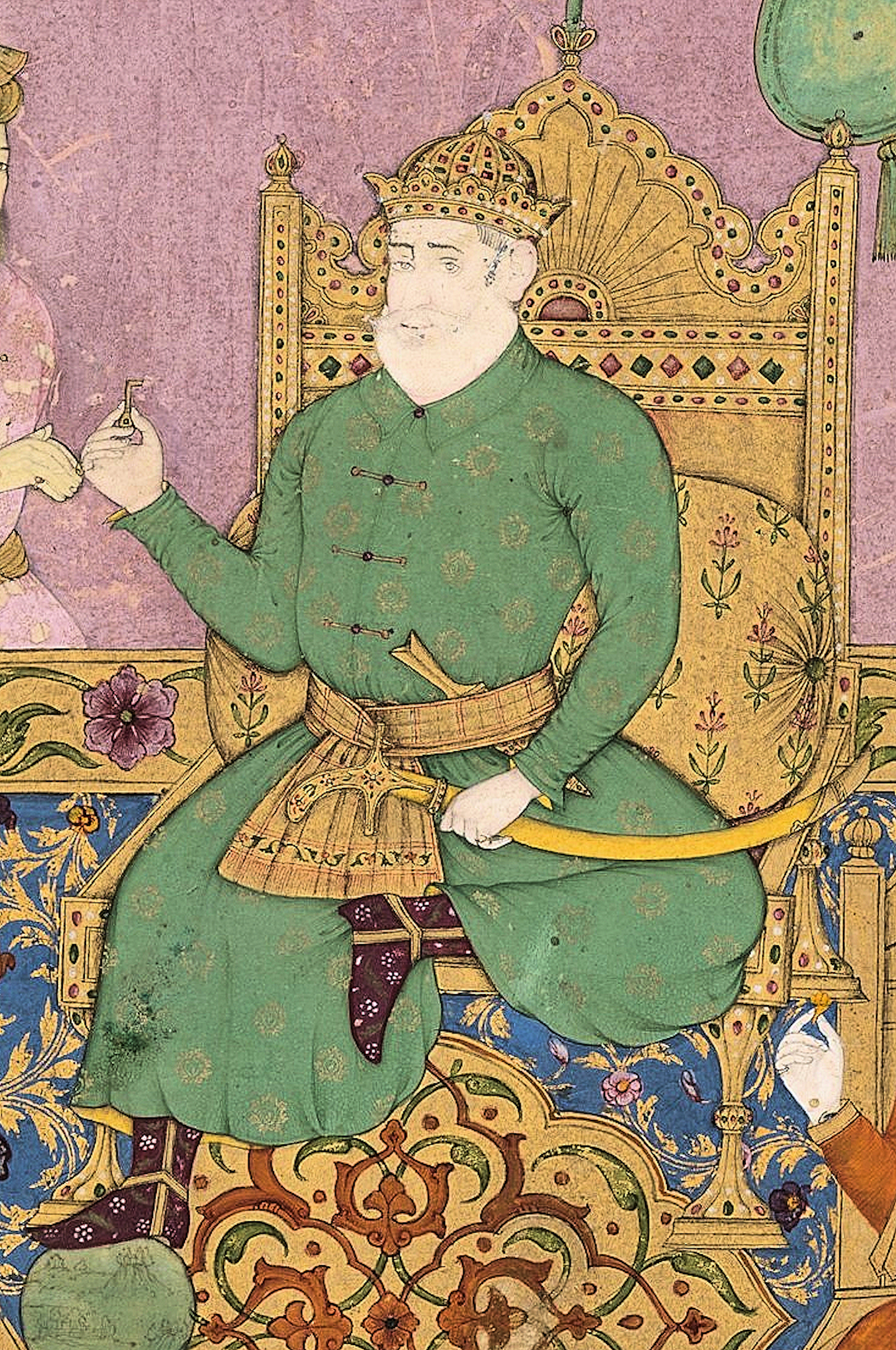
Portrait of Yusuf Adil Shah

== Invasion ==
The conquest of the Krishna-Tungabhadra doab further fueled Yusuf Adil Khan’s ambition for expansion. The political instability caused by Viranarasimha Raya’s usurpation and the ensuing revolts among the Vijayanagara nobles presented an opportunity for him to advance his territorial claims. Forming an alliance with Kasappa Udaiya, the governor of Adoni, Yusuf Adil Khan led his forces into Vijayanagara territory and laid siege to the strategically significant fort of Kandanavolu (Kurnool). His likely aim was to capture Kandanavolu, join forces with Kasappa Udaiya at Adavani, and then march along the Tungabhadra valley toward Vijayanagara. However, his plans were thwarted when Viranarasimha Raya dispatched the Aravidu chief, Ramaraja I, and his son Timma to counter the invasion. In a decisive battle, they inflicted a severe defeat on Yusuf Adil Khan forcing him into a disorderly retreat toward Adoni. As he attempted to regroup, the Vijayanagara forces defeated him again near Adoni and driving him out of their territory. Seizing the momentum, Ramaraja I and Thimma laid siege to Adoni fort and successfully captured it.

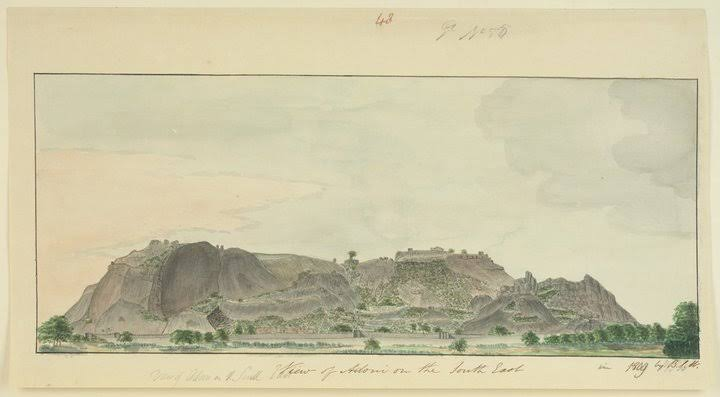
South East View of Adoni Fort (1805)

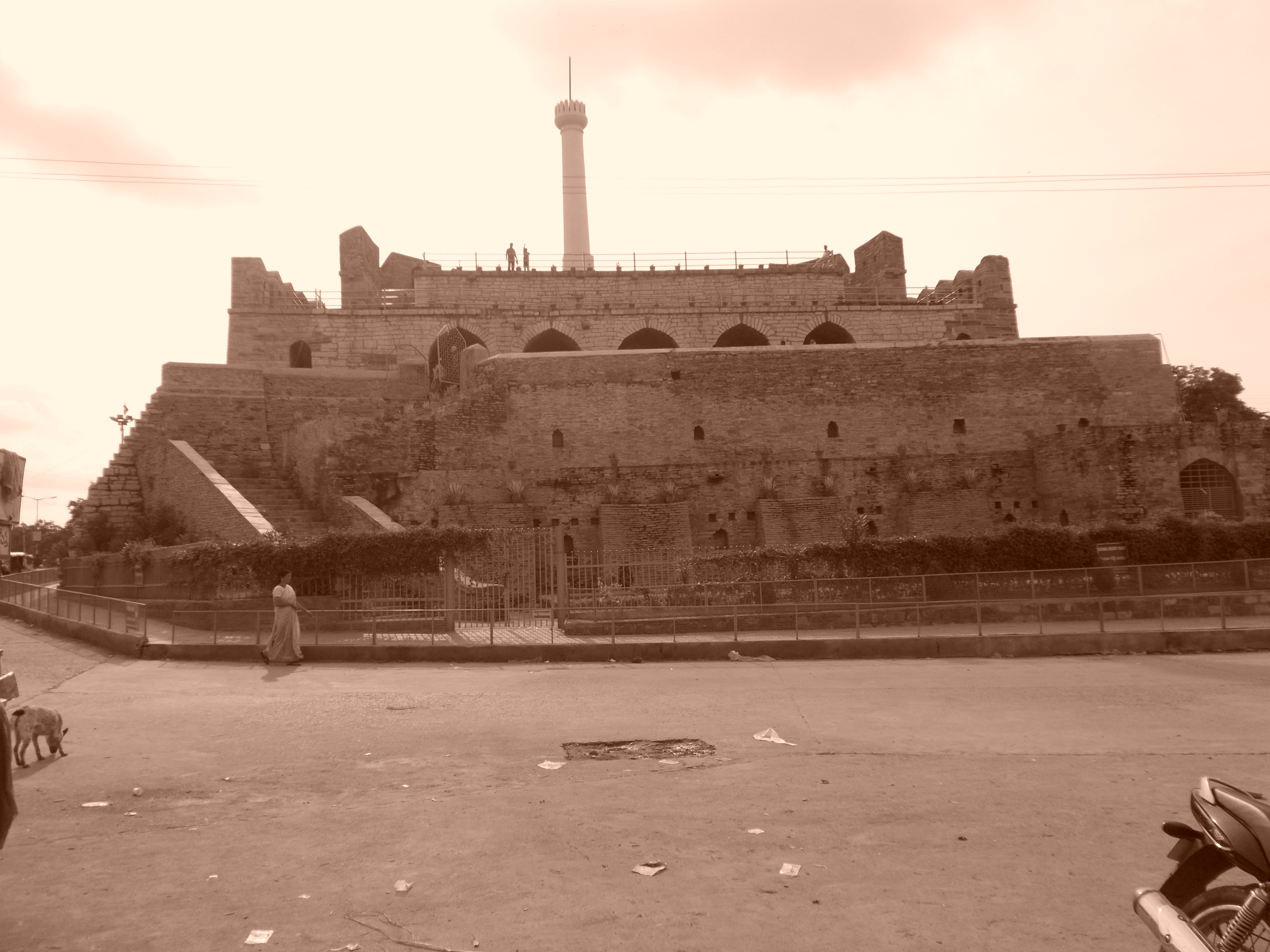
Front View of Kondareddy Buruju in Kurnool

== Aftermath ==
Emperor Viranarasimha Raya, overjoyed by the victory and destruction of his enemies, rewarded the Aravidu chiefs for their valor and loyalty. In recognition of their service, he granted them the fiefs of Kurnool and Adoni, strengthening their position within the kingdom. As a mark of honor, he adorned Thimma with the anklet of heroes.

== See also ==
- Bijapur Sultanate
- Vijayanagara Empire
- Aravidu Rama Raja I
- Yusuf Adil Shah
