= Chamaraja Wodeyar II =

Raja of Mysore from 1478 to 1513

4th Raja of Mysore
- Reign: 7 May 1478 – April 1513
- Predecessor: Timmaraja Wodeyar I (father)
- Successor: Chamaraja Wodeyar III (son)
- Born: 24 May 1463; Puragiri, Mysore
- Died: April 1513 (aged 49)
- Issue: Chamaraja Wodeyar III
- House: Wodeyar
- Father: Timmaraja Wodeyar I

Chamarajara Wodeyar II (Raja Hiriya Abiral Chamarajara Wodeyar II; 24 May 1463 – April 1513) was the fourth raja of the royal dynasty that ruled the Kingdom of Mysore. The rule of Chamarajara Wodeyar II began in 1478 and lasted until 1513.

== Multiple superiors ==
Chamaraja Wodeyar II succeeded his father Timmaraja Wodeyar I after his father's death in 1478. Chamaraja Wodeyar II ruled the Kingdom of Mysore for 35 years. This Raja's long-reigning monarch ensuring therefore the kingdom's survival was challenged by the constant threat from the Mughal Empire as well as European invasion. During his reign, Chamaraja Wodeyar II acted as a feudatory monarch under three families and eight emperors. His era surpassed that of all previous forefathers' reigns under these emperors.

Royal family	Emperors in Vijayanagara during Chamaraja Wodeyar II	Reign of feudal rule
The Sangama dynasty	Virupaksha Raya II	1478–1485
The Sangama dynasty	Praudha Raya	1485
The Saluva dynasty	Saluva Narasimha Deva Raya	1485–1491
The Saluva dynasty	Thimma Bhupala	1491
The Saluva dynasty	Narasimha Raya II	1491–1505
The Tuluva dynasty	Tuluva Narasa Nayaka	1491–1503
The Tuluva dynasty	Vira Narasimha Raya	1503–1509
The Tuluva dynasty	Krishna Deva Raya	1509–1513

== Quick roll-overs and insubordination within Vijayanagara ==
Soon after Virupaksha's death, Praudha Raya took over. Overpowered though he was, his subordinates exhibited insubordination. His own commander, his successor, and the founder of the Saluva dynasty, Saluva Narasimha Deva Raya, seized power from him and ascended the throne. Mysore had remained obedient to the Sangama family from the time the Mysore government was constituted nearly a century ago. This was also the case with other feudatory governors. Disgruntling grew right within the Saluva family after Saluva Narasimha Deva Raya lost a major portion of eastern Andhra to a long-time Vijayanagara opponent: Raja Purushottama Gajapati Kapilendra of Odisha. Other subordinate governors also began raising against Vijayanagara. After Deva Raya's death, his son Thimma Bhupala, who was enthroned, but was, within weeks, assassinated by a commander during political unrest in the capital Vijayanagara, which brought his brother, Narasimha Raya II, into power.

During Narasimha Raya II's minority, Saluva Narasimha Deva Raya's confidant and colleague, Tuluva Narasa Nayaka, also a commander, played his regent, suppressing/silencing all the supporters of the old Sangama dynasty, including Chamaraja Wodeyar II. Tuluva Narasa Nayaka's son, Tuluva Vira Narasimha, same as Narasimha Raya II in age, when both came of age, fell out on differences over the right to the throne. Soon after Tuluva Narasa Nayaka's death, Narasimha Raya II was ostensibly assassinated by Tuluva Vira Narasimha's henchmen. This led to the ruling of Vijayanagara by the Tuluva dynasty.

== Beginning of Mysore revolt ==
During all these developments, Chamaraja Wodeyar II had made minor profits in his rule, but mostly remained quiet about Vijayanagara, as did other feudal prefects. This obedience was further demanded by the growing power and might of Tuluva Narasimha Raya, who was 5 in wading off the northern Sultanates and other enemies. He defeated Yusuf Adil Khan of Bijapur Sultanate. However, over time, Chamaraja Wodeyar II, his chieftain in Ummattur, and other small political comptrollers rebelled against Tuluva Narasimha Raya, who, in his stead, placed Krishnadevaraya, and set South. In this conflict, the Portuguese joined hands with Tuluva Narasimha Raya, starting the first foreign intervention in Indian domestic affairs. The fallout of the battle was mixed. This introduced an air of insubordination amongst southern rulers and the empire. After Narasimha Raya's death in 1509, Chamaraja Wodeyar II again went silent to study the new emperor, Krishnadevaraya. However, in four years, Chamaraja Wodeyar II died at 50, in 1513, of natural causes.

== See also ==
- Wodeyar dynasty
- Tuluva dynasty
- Krishnadevaraya
