= Aravidu Rama Raja I =

Indian military leader

General of The Vijayanagara Empire
- Monarchs: Thimma Raja; Viranarasimha Raya

Personal details
- Born: Aravitipura, Vijayanagara Empire (present-day Kurnool district, Andhra Pradesh, India)
- Children: Aravidu Sri Ranga Raja; Aravidu Thimma
- Parent: Aravidu Bukka
- Occupation: Commander

Military service
- Allegiance: Vijayanagara Empire
- Branch/service: Vijayanagara Army
- Years of service: 1493-1505
- Rank: General
- Unit: Vijayanagara Infantry
- Battles/wars: See list: Battle of Manvi (1493); Yusuf Adil Shah's Invasion of Vijayanagara (1505); Battle of Kandanavolu; Battle of Adavani

Aravidu Rama Raja I was a prominent military leader and noble of the Vijayanagara Empire belonging to the Aravidu Family. He played a key role in defending the empire against the expansionist ambitions of the Bahamani and Bijapur sultanates. Alongside his son Thimma, he inflicted a defeat on Yusuf Adil Shah of Bijapur in the battles of Kandanavolu and Adavani securing Vijayanagara’s northern frontiers. He also supported Viranarasimha Raya in consolidating his rule in 1505.

== Family ==
Aravidu Rama Raja I was a member of the Aravidu family. He was the son of Aravidu Bukka and Ballambika, the father of Aravidu Thimma and Sri Ranga Raja, and the grandfather of Vijayanagara Empire regent Rama Raya. He served as general under Saluva Dynasty ruler Thimma Raja and Tuluva Dynasty ruler Viranarasimha Raya.

== Military career ==
=== Battle of Manvi (1493) ===
In April 1493, Yusuf Adil Shah advanced his army and encamped near Thimma Raja’s forces, carefully fortifying his position by distributing the ground among his officers and constructing entrenchments to guard against surprise attacks. His army was led by several distinguished generals, including Kamal Khan, Deccani Ghuzunfur Beg, Mirza Jehangeer, and Dawood Khan Lody. On the Vijayanagara side, Thimma Raja was accompanied by key leaders such as Tuluva Narasa Nayaka, Aravidu Bukka, and possibly his son, Aravidu Rama Raja. After days of inactivity, both armies finally engaged in battle on a Saturday in April. Initially, the Vijayanagara forces had the upper hand, inflicting heavy losses on the Bijapur troops, who retreated in disorder after losing around five hundred soldiers. Mistaking this for a complete rout, Thimma Raja’s men turned to looting the enemy’s abandoned supplies, scattering in the process. Seizing this opportunity, a captured officer from Yusuf Adil Shah’s army managed to escape and reported to his commander that the Vijayanagara forces had dispersed, leaving them vulnerable to a counterattack. Encouraged by this intelligence, Yusuf Adil Shah decided to shift his approach. Rather than launching an immediate offensive, he sent a diplomatic message to Thimma Raja, requesting peace and offering to acknowledge allegiance to the Vijayanagara Raya in exchange for the territories he currently controlled.

Believing Yusuf Adil Khan’s offer of allegiance to be genuine, the Thimma Raja and his general, Thimma Raja, attended a field conference with only a few hundred followers and their principal nobles. However, this meeting turned into an ambush as Yusuf Adil Shah with his entire army, launched a sudden and devastating attack. The Raya was wounded in the skirmish, and seventy high-ranking officers were killed, causing panic among the Hindu troops, who fled in disarray. Seizing the moment, Yusuf advanced further, forcing Thimma Raja to hastily assemble a defensive force of 7,000 cavalry, a large number of infantry, and 300 war elephants. Despite these efforts, Yusuf Adil Shah led a ferocious charge, breaking through the Vijayanagara ranks. Overwhelmed, Thimma Raja retreated, leaving behind 200 elephants, 1,000 horses, and a massive treasure of sixty lakhs of hoons in enemy hands. Capitalizing on this victory Yusuf Adil Shah rewarded his general Roab Jung Bahadur Khan with fifty elephants and one lakh of hoons assigning him the task of capturing the strategically important forts of Mudgal and Raichur. Within forty days both forts fell under Bijapur’s control. Triumphant, Yusuf Adil Shah returned to his capital.

=== Battles of Kandanavolu and Adavani ===
Yusuf Adil Shah the founder of the Adil Shahi dynasty of Bijapur, sought to expand his territory by bringing the Krishna-Tungabhadra doab under his control. After successfully acquiring this region in 1502. The political instability in the Vijayanagara Empire caused by the usurpation of the throne by Viranarasimha Raya in 1505 and the subsequent rebellions of nobles, provided Yusuf Adil Shah with an opportunity to advance his territorial aspirations. Forming an alliance with Kasappa Odaya, the governor of Adavani (Adoni), he led his forces into Vijayanagara territory and laid siege to the fort of Kandanavolu (Kurnool). His goal was likely to capture Kandanavolu join forces with Kasappa Odaya and march toward Vijayanagara itself. However his plans were thwarted by the Aravidu chiefs, Rama Raja I and his son Timma, who were sent by Viranarasimha Raya to counter the invasion. The Vijayanagara forces defeated Yusuf Adil Khan, forcing him into a hasty retreat toward Adavani. As he attempted to regroup, the Aravidu defeated him again near Adavani. Seizing the advantage, they then besieged and captured the fort of Adavani.

== See also ==
- Rama Raya
- Aravidu dynasty
- Vijayanagara Empire
