= Varadambikaparinayam =

16th-century Sanskrit campū by Tirumalāmbā

- Author: Tirumalāmbā
- Original title: वरदाम्बिकापरिणयचम्पूः
- Language: Sanskrit
- Genre: Campū kāvya
- Set in: Vijayanagara Empire, early 16th century
- Publication date: 16th century
- Media type: Manuscript; later printed editions
- Narrative centres on Tuluva Narasa Nayaka, Achyuta Deva Raya, Varadambika and their son Venkatadri; modern editions by Lakshman Sarup (1960) and Suryakanta (1970)

Varadambikaparinayam, or Varadambikaparinaya (IAST: Varadāmbikāpariṇayam, "The Marriage of Varadāmbikā"), is a sixteenth-century Sanskrit campū, combining prose and verse, by Tirumalāmbā, a poet at the court of Achyuta Deva Raya. Despite its title, the work is not confined to Achyuta's marriage to Varadambika: its first half largely recounts the conquests of his father, Narasa Nāyaka, while the second turns to Achyuta, Varadambika and the birth of their son Venkatadri.

== Name ==
The title means "The Marriage of Varadāmbikā"; modern scholarship also uses Varadāmbikā-pariṇaya Campū.

== Historical background ==
Tirumalāmbā flourished at the court of Achyuta, who ruled from 1529 to 1542. Sudyka regards her as probably one of his wives if she is identical with Ōduva Tirumalaidēvi of a Srirangam inscription, but the identification remains uncertain. Varadambika was the daughter of a Salaga chief and Achyuta's senior queen. Its date is uncertain.

== Narrative and style ==
The opening movement reshapes Narasa Nāyaka's campaigns as a digvijaya, or conquest of the directions, rather than following a strict chronology. A battle with a ruler called the Chola receives unusually elaborate treatment, although his historical identity is uncertain. The narrative then passes to Achyuta's first sight of Varadambika, his longing for her, their marriage, her pregnancy and Venkatadri's birth. Sudyka interprets the movement from the father's victories to the son's marriage and heir as part of a wider presentation of Tuluva dynastic legitimacy.

The campū alternates ornate prose with metrical verse. Its descriptions of armies, battles, landscapes and courtly scenes often outweigh the slender plot, displaying Tirumalāmbā's fondness for long compounds, comparisons and figures of speech.

Despite its title, the poem does not begin as a conventional marriage narrative. Tirumalāmbā first looks backwards to the career of Achyuta's father, Narasa Nāyaka, whom she calls King Narasiṃha, and follows his armies through campaigns, marches and battles before turning to the marriage of Achyuta and Varadambika. The battle against the Chola ruler is particularly elaborate, transforming the battlefield into a setting for the imagery and verbal ornament characteristic of Sanskrit court poetry.

== Textual history ==
P. P. S. Sastri's 1930 catalogue of the Tanjore Maharaja Serfoji's Sarasvati Mahal Library records a manuscript of the work. Suryakanta published an edition with English translation, notes and introduction in 1970.

== See also ==
- Achyutarayabhyudayam
- Madhuravijayam
- Vijayanagara literature
