= Jalahalli inscriptions and hero stones =

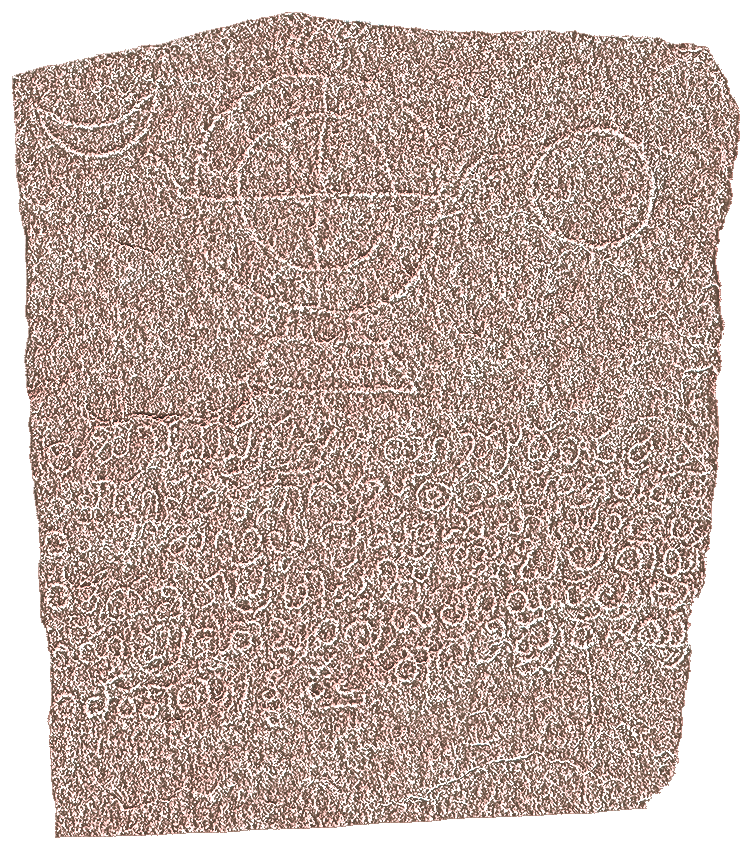
- Digital Image of the Jalahalli 1506CE Inscription
- Material: Stone
- Height: 92 cm (36 in)
- Width: 81 cm (32 in)
- Writing: Kannada
- Created: 28 December 1506 (519 years ago)
- Discovered: 1902
- Discovered by: BL Rice
- Present location: 13.045750°N 77.547611°E
- Language: Kannada

Jalahalli inscriptions and hero stones are relics found in a microlithic tool factory in Jalahalli, a locality in North Bengaluru in the Indian state of Karnataka.

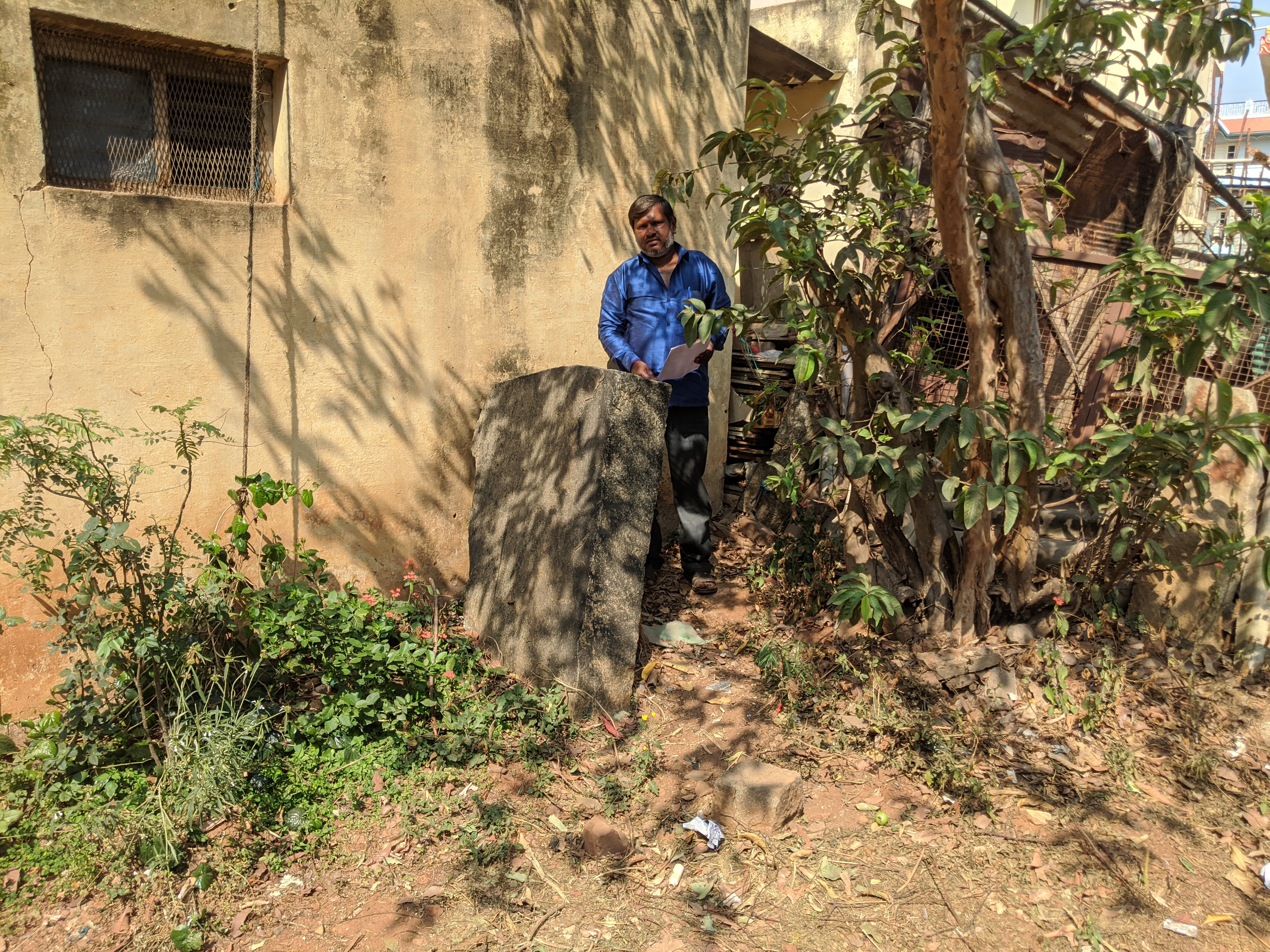
Jalahalli 1506CE Inscription.

== 1506CE inscription ==
Jalahalli is a prehistoric site of a in the Bengaluru region that was discovered during World War II. It houses a 16th-century Kannada donatory inscription. Trees found in a place often lent their names to the village surrounding them. The complete story of the donatory grants cannot be deduced as the text is effaced, but from the available text it seems that the inscription records a grant by Tipparasayya, an official of King Virapratapa Bhujabala. The inscription does not name the king explicitly except for his titles, However, based on other inscriptions, the King during that period was likely Vira Narasimha, who happened to be the half-brother of King Krishnadevaraya. The official position of Tipparasayya is not clear from the inscription text. The inscription can presently be found in a private site behind Muthyalamma and Anjeneya temple.

=== Physical characteristics ===
The inscription is 92 cm tall and 81 cm wide. The Kannada characters are approximately 3 cm tall, 2 cm wide and 0.24 cm deep (shallow depth). A figure of the Sun and the Moon inscribed on the stone serve as symbolic representations, indicating that the grant was intended to be perpetual. The inscribed Sudharshana Chakra indicates the grant was likely made to a Sri Vaishnava temple.

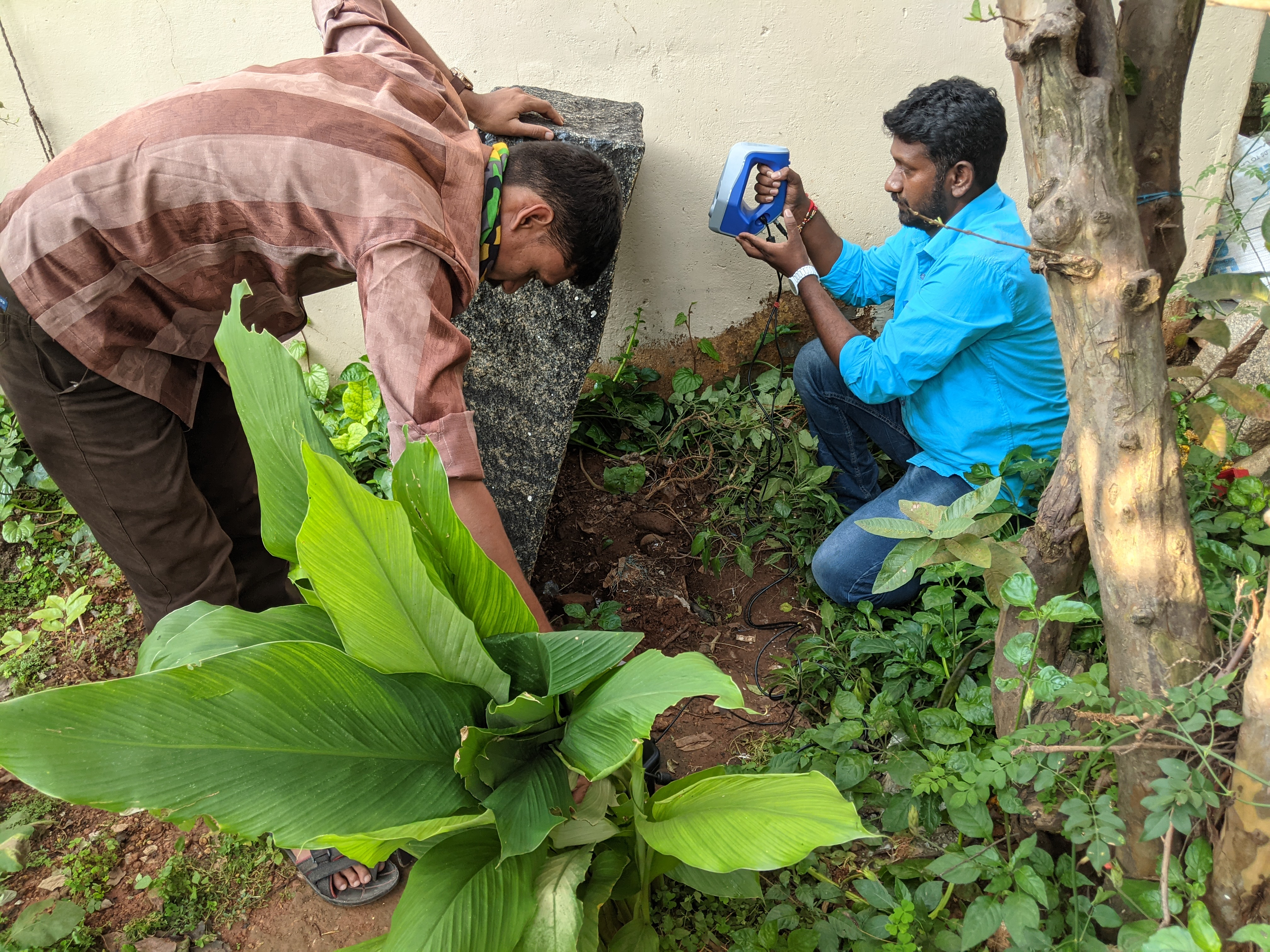
3D Scanning of the Jalahalli 1506CE Inscription.

=== Transliteration ===
The transliteration was first published in the Epigraphia Carnatica, Volume 9. The transliteration is the rereading of the inscription published in the journal of the Mythic Society.

Digital Images of each of the characters of this inscription, images of the inscription itself, summary and the other information about the inscription have been shared via Akshara Bhandara software.

Line Number	Kannada	IAST
1	೦ ಶುಭಮಸ್ತು ಸ್ವಸ್ತಿ ಜಯಾಭ್ಯುದಯ ಶಾಲಿ	0 śubhamastu svasti jayābhyudaya śāli
2	೦ ವಾಹನ ಶಕ ಸಾ ೧೪೨೮ ಕ್ಷಯ ಸಂವತ್ಸರದ	0 vāhana śaka 1428 kṣaya saṃvatsarada
3	೦ ಕಾರ್ತ್ತಿಕ ಶು೧೨ ಲು . ಮಂಮ್ಮಹಾಮಂಡಲೇ	0 kārttika śu12 lu śrī maṃmmahāmaṃḍale
4	೦ ಶ್ವ[ರ] ಶ್ರೀವೀರಪ್ರತಾಪ ಭುಜಬಲರಾಯ	0 śva[ra] śrīvīrapratāpa bhujabalarāya
5	೦ ರೂ ಪೃಥ್ವಿರಾಜ್ಯಂಗೈಉತಂಯಿರಲು ಅ	0 rū pṛthvirājyaṃgaiutaṃyiralu a
6	೦ ವರ ಕಾರ್ಯ್ಯಕ್ಕೆ ಕರ್ತ್ತರಾದ ತಿಪ್ಪರಸಯ್ಯ	0 vara kāryyakkĕ karttarāda tipparasayya
	( ಮುಂದೆ ಬರೆದಿಲ್ಲ)	( Not Written further )
