= Tuluva Isvara Nayaka =

Vijayanagaran General

Tuluva Ishvara Nayaka

Nayaka

General of Vijayanagara Empire
- Monarch: Saluva Narasimha Deva Raya
- Succeeded by: Tuluva Narasa Nayaka

Personal details
- Spouse: Bukkamma
- Children: Tuluva Narasa Nayaka
- Parents: Timma Bhupala (father); Devaki (mother)
- Profession: General

Military service
- Allegiance: Vijayanagara Empire

Tuluva Isvara Nayaka was a commander of the Vijayanagara Empire. He was the father of Tuluva Narasa Nayaka and grandfather of the emperors Vira Narasimha Raya, Krishnadevaraya and Achyuta Deva Raya. He married Bukkamma. He derived lineage from the legendary Yayati and the Chandravamsha.

He served on Saluva Narasimha Deva Raya’s numerous expeditions with his son Tuluva Narasa Nayaka.

== Battle of kandukuru ==
When the Bahamani sultan reached kanchi and sacked the city and while retreating to his camp in Nellore accompanied with much booty, while returning to his stronghold sultan Muhammad Shah III suffered a terrible defeat at kandukuru by the hands of isvara Nayaka. This defeat at the kandukuru marks the beginning of the decline of the glory of the and the strength of the Bahamani sultanate.
