= Venkata I =

Emperor of Vijayanagara from 1542 to 1543

Emperor of Vijayanagara
- Reign: c. September 1542 – c. January 1543
- Predecessor: Achyuta Deva Raya
- Successor: Sadasiva Raya
- Dynasty: Tuluva
- Father: Achyuta Deva Raya
- Mother: Varadambika
- Religion: Hinduism

Venkata I (reigned 1542–1543), also known as Venkata Raya and Venkatadri Raya, was an Emperor of Vijayanagara from the Tuluva Dynasty. He was the son of Emperor Achyuta Deva Raya, whom he succeeded in 1542.

== Life ==
An underage Venkata Raya succeeded his father, the Emperor Achyuta Deva Raya as the Emperor of Vijayanagara and his maternal uncle Salakaraju Chinna Tirumala (Salakaraju Chinna Timmalayyadéva or Salakaraja Chinna Tirumalayyadeva) became the imperial regent. Salakaraju assassinated all the claimants to the throne including Venkata Raya and assumed full imperial powers. Only Sadasiva Raya (son of Ranga Raya), who had hidden himself in the fort of Gutti, escaped.

As soon as Salakaraju heard about the plans of Aliya Rama Raya and his brothers (Tirumala Deva Raya and Venkatadri Raya) to dethrone him, he invited the Turko-Persian Sultan of Bijapur Ibrahim Adil Shah I and placed him on the imperial throne of Vijayanagara for seven days. This was too much for the nobility of the Vijayanagara Empire to tolerate.

But they acted cleverly, offered full support to Salakaraju and requested him to send away Ibrahim Adil Shah I which he did after paying him a suitable compensation.

In 1543, Aliya Rama Raya and his supporters marched into Vijayanagara, killed Salakaraju and placed Sadasiva Raya on the throne.
