= Achyuta Deva Raya =

Emperor of Vijayanagara from 1529 to 1542

- Rajadhiraja
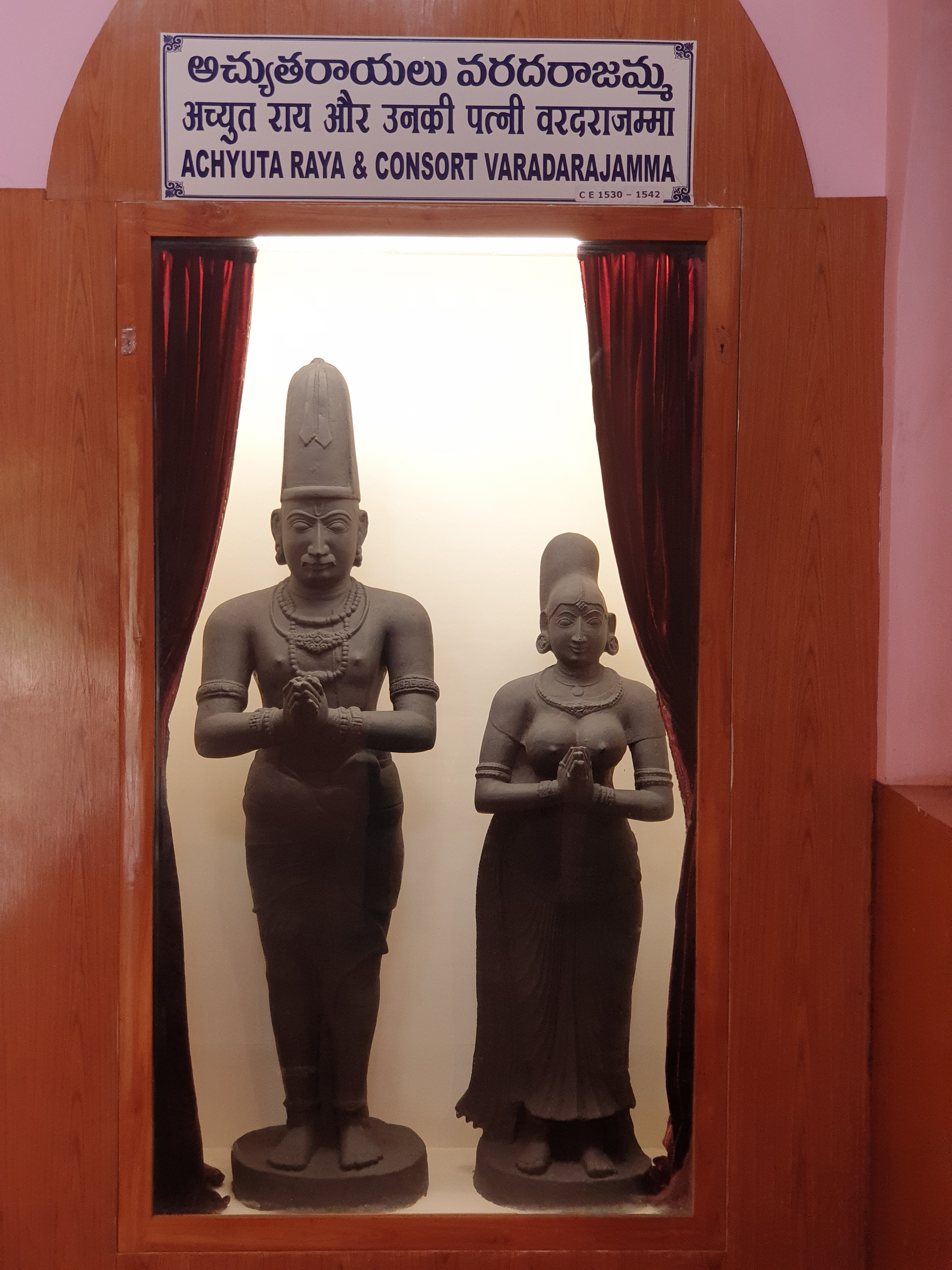
- Achyutadevaraya (left) and his consort Varadambika (right)

Emperor of Vijayanagara
- Reign: 30 November 1529 – June 1542
- Coronation: 30 November 1529; Vijayanagara, Vijayanagara Empire
- Predecessor: Krishnadevaraya
- Successor: Venkata I
- Born: Vijayanagara, Vijayanagara Empire (modern day Hampi, Karnataka, India)
- Died: June 1542; Tirumala, Vijayanagara Empire (present-day Karnataka, India)
- Consorts: Tirumalamba; Varadambika
- Issue: Venkata I
- Dynasty: Tuluva
- Father: Tuluva Narasa Nayaka
- Mother: Obamamba
- Religion: Hinduism

Achyuta Deva Raya (died June 1542) was a emperor of Vijayanagara who succeeded his older brother, Krishnadevaraya, after the latter's death in 1529.

Achyutaraya patronised the Kannada poet Chatu Vittalanatha, the great composer and singer Purandaradasa, one of the major proponents of Carnatic music, and the Sanskrit scholar Rajanatha Dindima II. Upon his death, the succession was disputed, sparking Vijayanagara civil war. His son Venkata I succeeded him but ruled for a very short period and was killed in a chaotic succession dispute in which many claimants to the throne were killed. The dispute ended when his nephew, (younger brother's son) Sadasiva Raya, finally became the emperor while yet a child, under the regency of Rama Raya, a son-in-law of Krishnadevaraya. His chief queen's name was Varadambika. Sadasiva Raya was probably the son of Varadambika's sister Hemavati and her husband Ranga Raya, the younger brother of King Achyutaraya. His second queen, Tirumalamba, was a noted poetess known for composing the Varadambika Parinaya Campu.

During his reign, Fernao Nuniz, a Portuguese-Jewish traveller, chronicler and horse trader visited India and spent three years in Vijayanagara.

== Reign ==
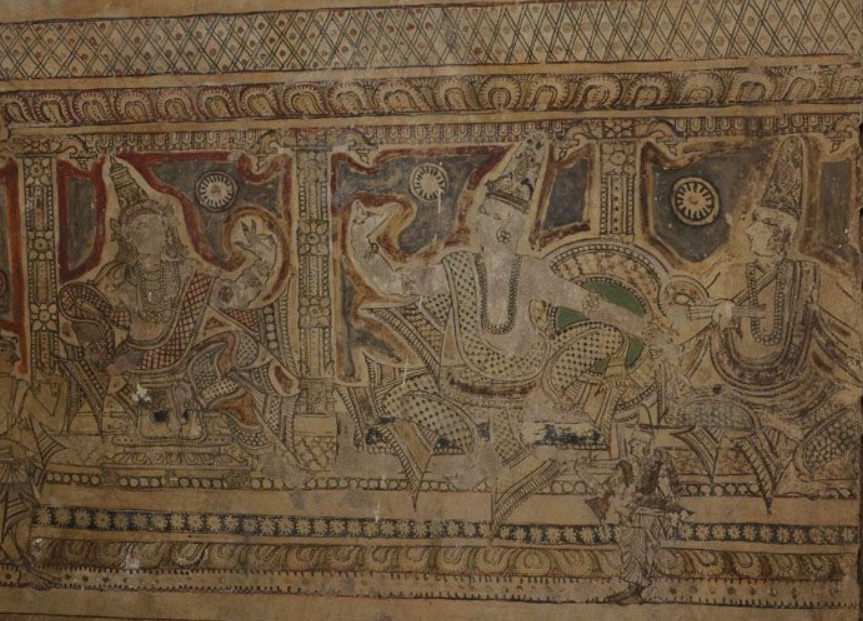
King Achyuta Deva Raya (center), commander Salakaraju Tirumala, and allied Pandya King Sri Vallabha (right). This Tiruppudaimarudur mural scene depicts the coronation of allied Pandya King Sri Vallabha attended by King Achyuta Deva Raya and his commander after their southern campaign, 1600s.

The time when Achyuta Deva Raya became the emperor was by no means a favorable one. The peace and prosperity of the halcyon days under Krishnadevaraya were coming to an end. Feudatories and enemies were waiting for an opportunity to bring down the empire. In addition, Achyuta Deva Raya had to contend with the powerful Rama Raya, who was competing for the throne.

While the works of Nuniz speak very lowly of Achyuta Deva Raya as being a monarch given to vices and cruelty, there is enough evidence to prove that the emperor was indeed noteworthy in his own right and fought hard to keep the prosperity of the empire alive. He had been personally chosen by Krishnadevaraya himself as a capable successor, handpicked to assume the imperial throne.

The Turko-Persian Sultan Ismail Adil Shah of Bijapur invaded and captured the Raichur doab. The Gajapatis of Orissa and Quli Qutub Shah of Golconda Sultanate were defeated and pushed back. Achyuta Deva Raya along with his general Salakaraju Tirumala went on a southern campaign to bring the governors of Travancore and Ummathur under control. They were successful. Then they attacked the doab north of the Tungabhadra and recaptured the forts of Raichur and Mudgal successfully.

The two Sanskrit works Achyutarayabhyudayam (lit. 'Exaltation of Achyutaraya') and Varadambikaparinayam (lit. 'Wedding of Varadambika') describe the emperor's life and reign in detail.

Throughout his rule, Achyuta Deva Raya had to contend with the manipulations of Rama Raya who in his powerful capacity had replaced many of the faithful servants of the Empire in high ranking positions with men of his own favour. On more than one occasion the Bahmani Sultans were brought in to play the role of mediator between the emperor and Aliya Rama Raya in the game of power sharing. This would further weaken the Empire. Around 1540, Rama Raya imprisoned Achyuta Deva Raya in a coup.

In 1542, Achyuta Deva Raya died, and was succeeded by his young son of Venkata I (Venkata Raya or Venkatadri Raya). But he was soon killed, and Sadasiva Raya became the new emperor. Rama Raya became the imperial regent and let very little governance in the hands of Sadasiva Raya.

The Tiruvengalanatha temple was built at Vijayanagara during his reign. It has become popularly known by his name as Achyutaraya temple, rather than by the name of the deity Venkateswara to whom the temple was dedicated.

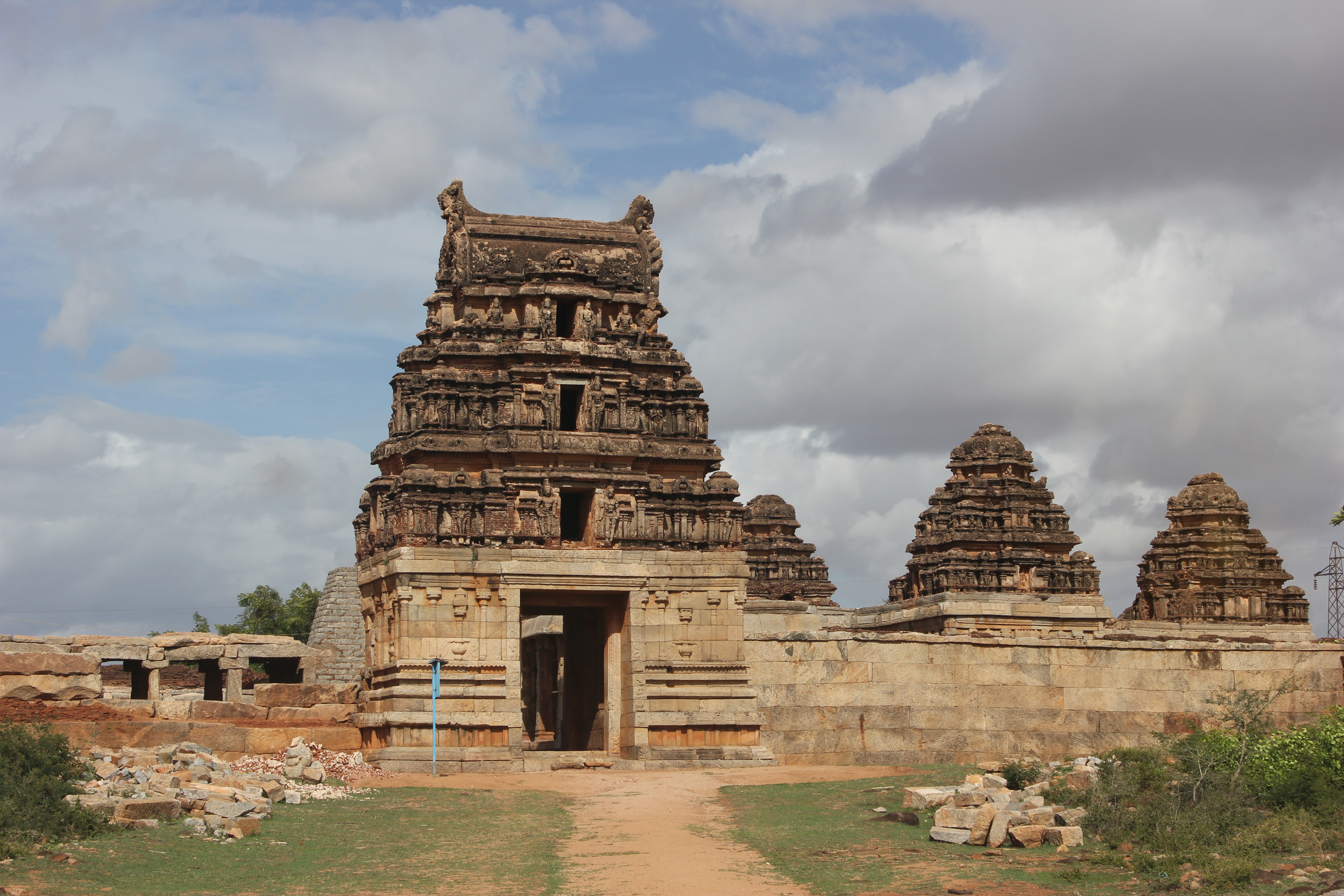
The Shiva temple at Timmalapura was constructed in 1539 CE during the reign of Achyuta Deva Raya

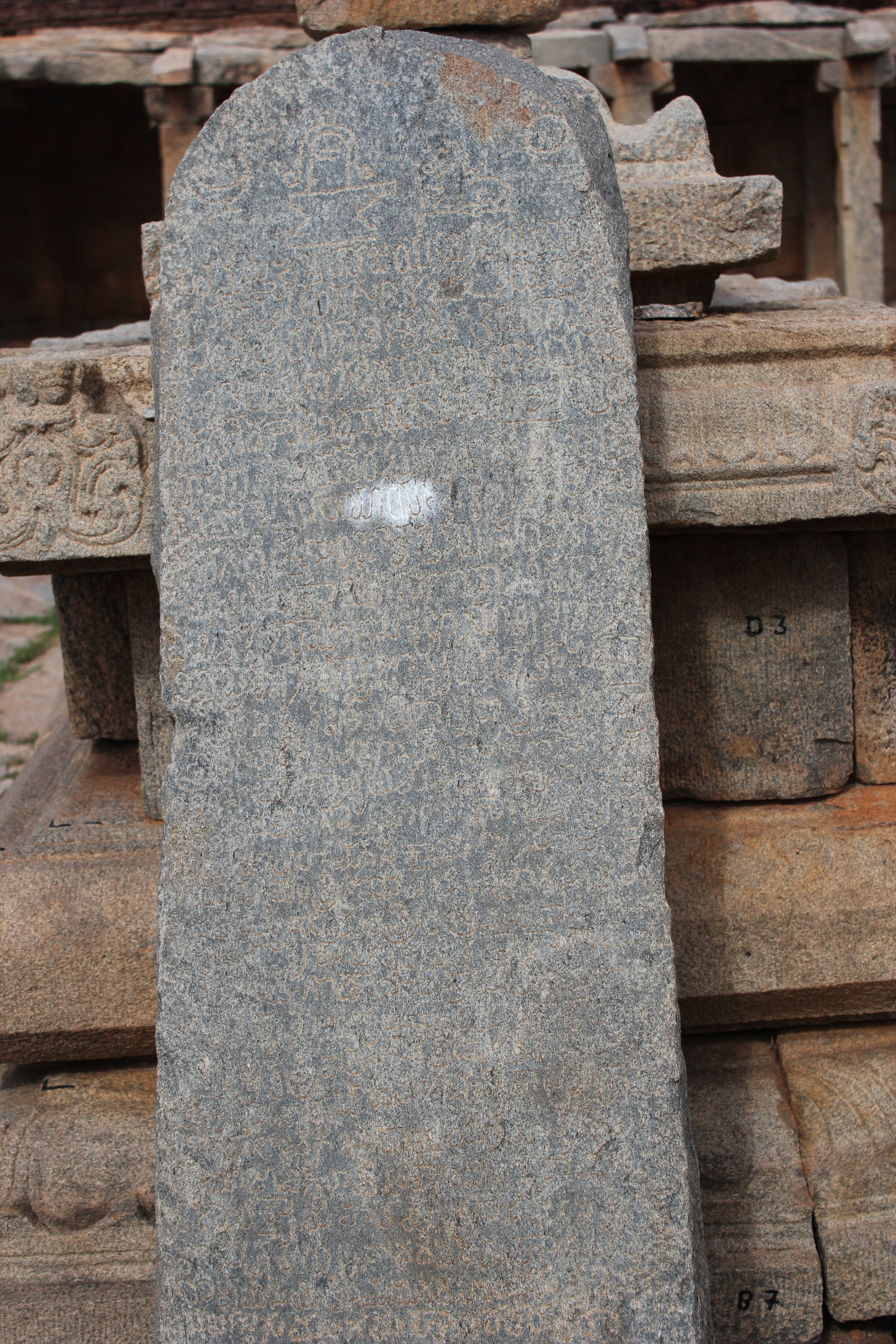
Kannada inscription of emperor Achyuta Deva Raya dated 1539 CE in the Shiva temple in Timmalapura

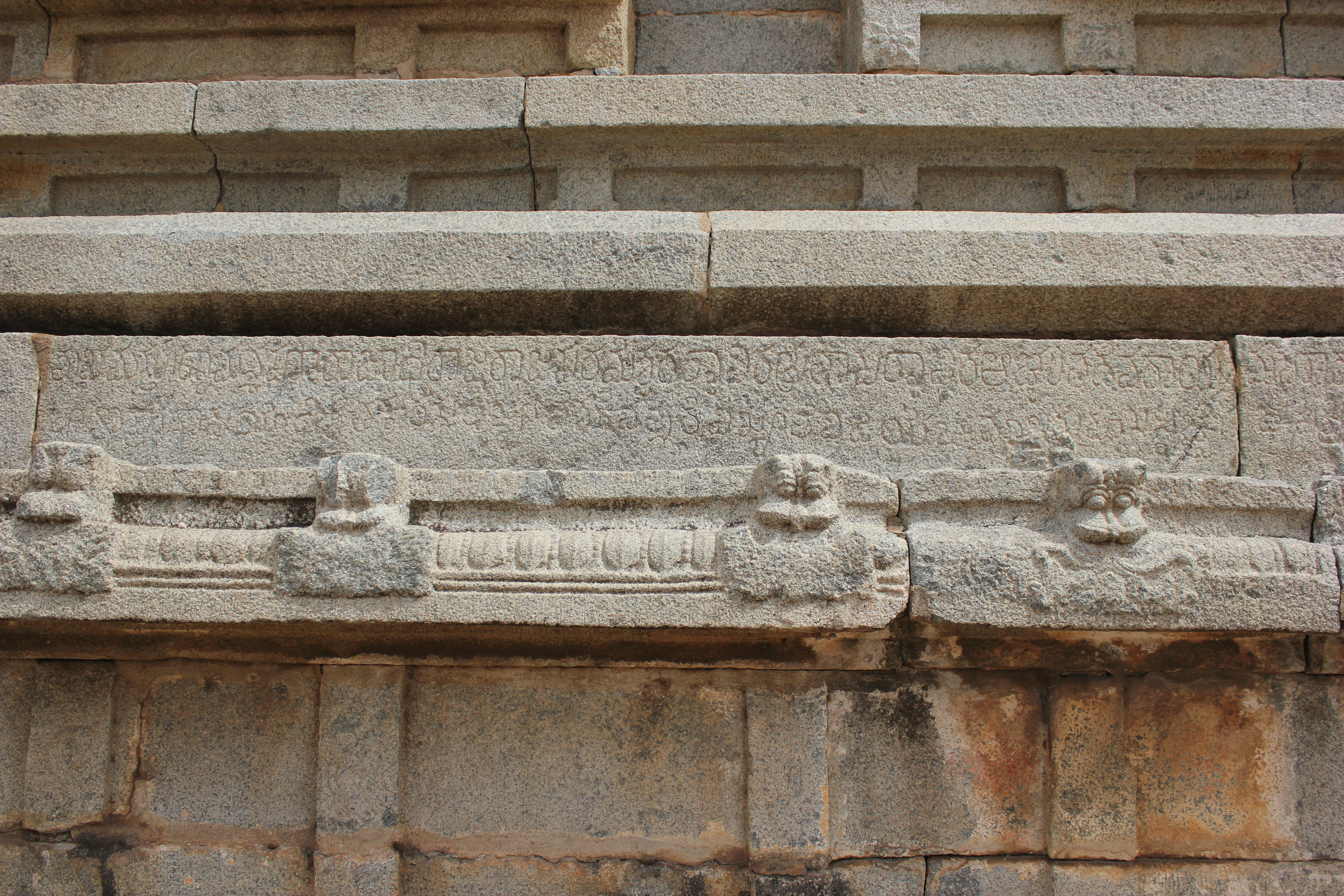
Kannada inscription (1536 CE) of emperor Achyuta Deva Raya on molding of Vittala temple in Hampi

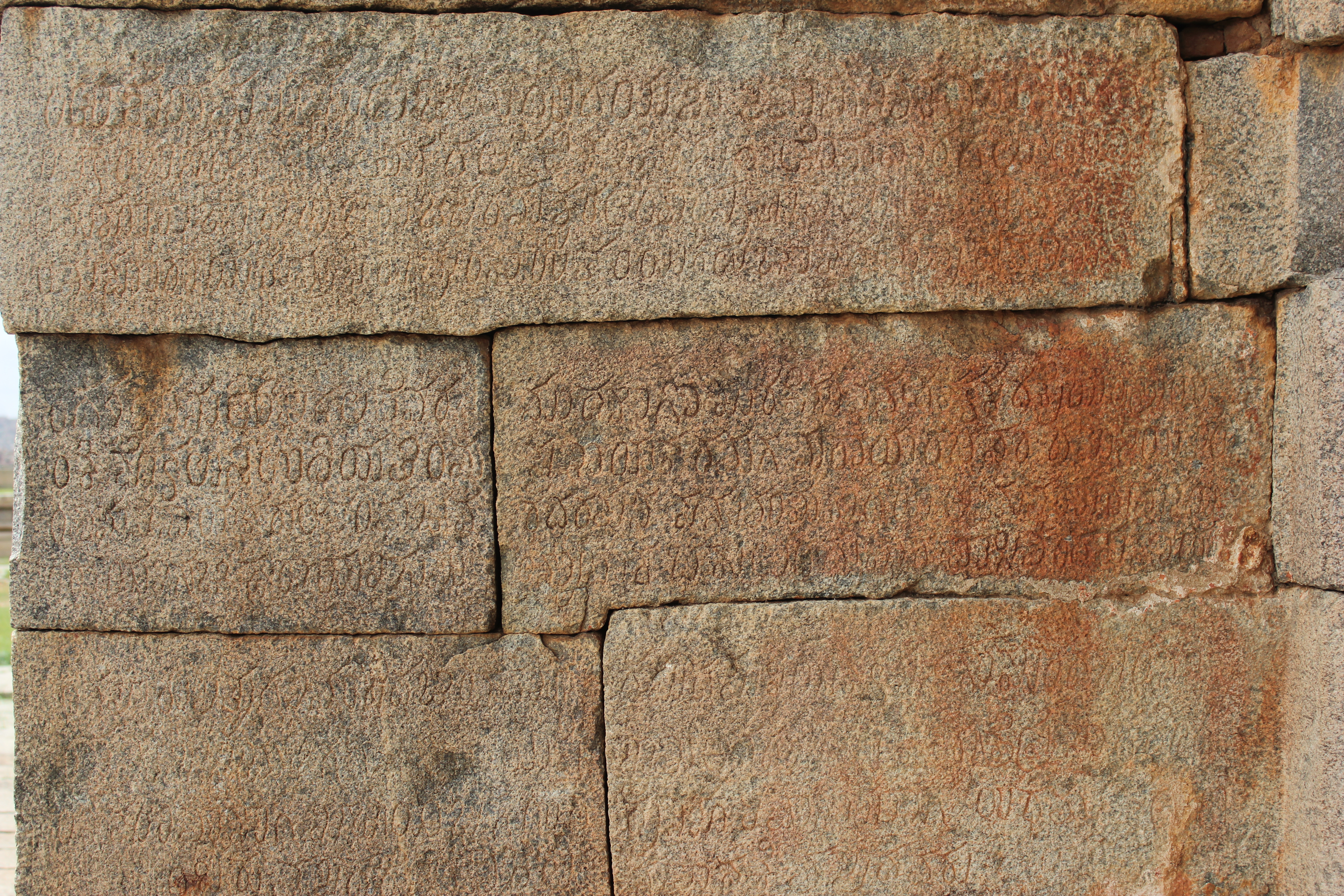
Kannada inscription (1536 CE) of emperor Achyuta Deva Raya at the Vittala temple in Hampi

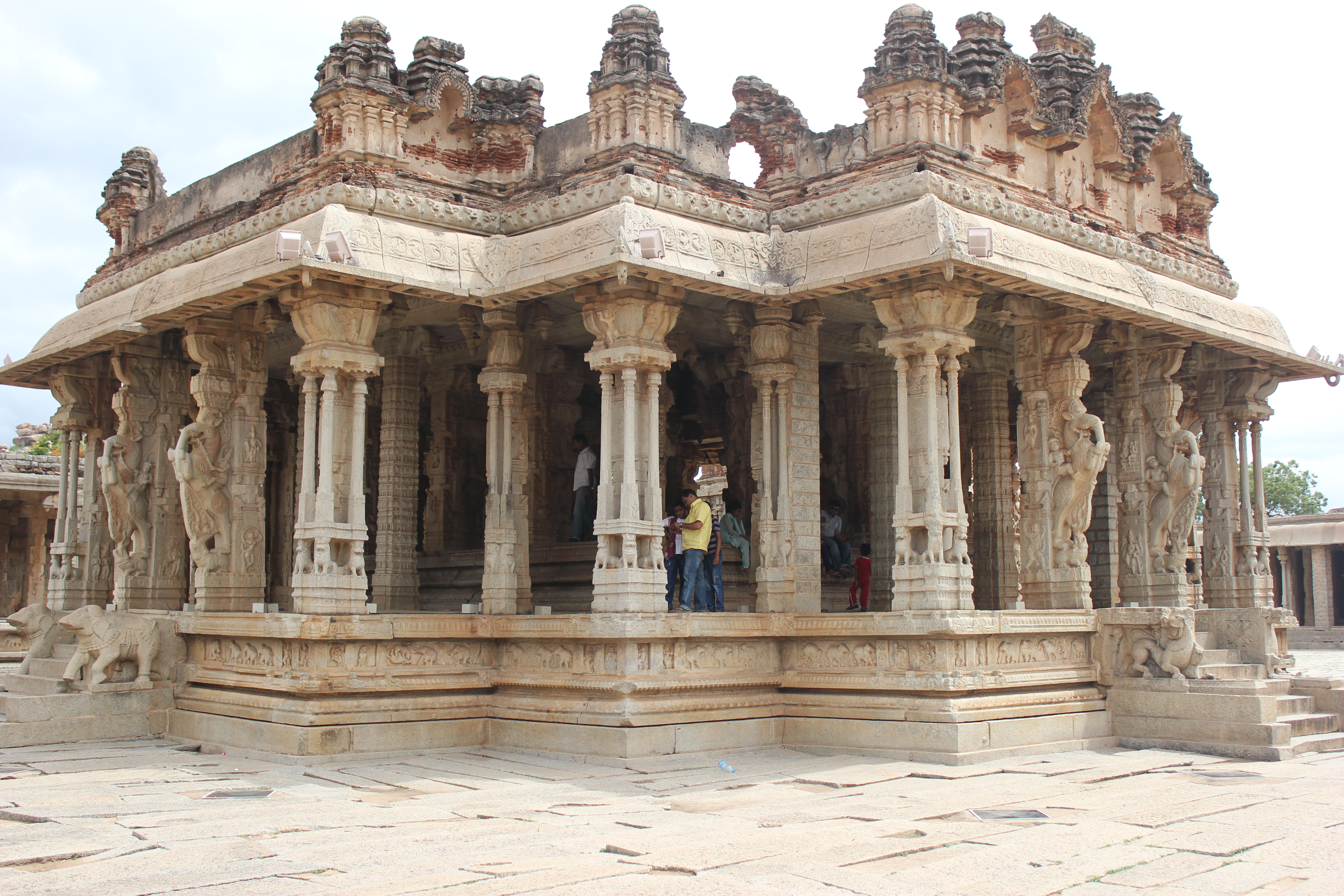
Vitthala temple complex completed during the reign of King Achyuta Raya (1529-1542 AD)

Preceded by Krishnadevaraya	Vijayanagar empire 1529–1542	Succeeded by Sadashiva Raya
