= Aravidu Thimma =

Military officer

Military General
- Incumbent
- Assumed office 1505
- Monarch: Viranarasimha Raya

Personal details
- Parent: Aravidu Rama Raja I (father)

Military service
- Allegiance: Vijayanagara Empire
- Battles/wars: Yusuf Adil Shah's Invasion of Vijayanagara (1505); Battle of Kandanavolu; Battle of Adavani

Aravidu Thimma was a general in the Vijayanagara Empire during the sixteenth century. A prominent member of the Aravidu family, he was the son of Aravidu Rama Raja I and Lakkamba. He defended the Vijayanagara Empire against Yusuf Adil Shah’s invasion. After his victories against Yusuf Adil Shah he captured Kasappa Udaiya, the governor of Adoni and presented him before the Emperor. He was also known for his patronage of literature and religious contributions.

== Family ==
Aravidu Rama Raja I had a son named Timma from his wife, Lakkamba. Timma married Gopama Devi and had several sons, including Tirumala, Vitthala, Chinna Timma, and Papa Timma. He also had another wife, Tirumala Devi, who gave birth to his sons Konappa and Sri Rangaraja.

== Military career ==
Yusuf Adil Khan’s conquest of the Krishna-Tungabhadra doab fueled his ambitions for expansion, especially as Vijayanagara faced internal strife following Viranarasimha Raya’s usurpation. Seeing an opportunity, he allied with Kasappa Udaiya, the governor of Adoni and led an invasion into Vijayanagara territory, laying siege to the vital fort of Kandanavolu (Kurnool). His strategy appeared to involve capturing Kandanavolu, linking up with Kasappa Udaiya at Adavani, and advancing along the Tungabhadra valley toward Vijayanagara. However, his plans were disrupted when Viranarasimha Raya sent Aravidu Rama Raja I and Aravidu Thimma to confront him. In a battle, they inflicted a defeat on Yusuf Adil Khan forcing him into a hasty retreat toward Adoni. As he attempted to regroup, the Vijayanagara forces defeated him again near Adoni routing his army and expelling him from their territory. Capitalizing on their victory, Aravidu Rama Raja I and Thimma pursued the offensive, besieging and capturing the Adoni fort.

After Thimma’s victories against Yusuf Adil Shah he captured the governor of Adoni Kasappa Udaiya, and brought him as a prisoner before Emperor Viranarasimha Raya. Pleased with Thimma’s success and loyalty, the emperor honored him by presenting him with the prestigious Gandapendera anklet, a symbol of valor and distinction in recognition of his service to the empire.

== See also ==
- Aravidu Rama Raja I
- Rama Raya
- Vijayanagara Empire
- Viranarasimha Raya
