= Timmaraja Wodeyar I =

Raja of Mysore from 1459 to 1478

3rd Raja of Mysore
- Reign: 23 January 1459 – May 1478
- Predecessor: Chamaraja Wodeyar I (father)
- Successor: Chamaraja Wodeyar II (son)
- Born: 3 October 1433; Puragiri, Mysore
- Died: May 1478 (aged 44)
- Issue: Chamaraja Wodeyar II
- House: Wodeyar
- Father: Chamaraja Wodeyar I

Timmaraja Wodeyar I (Appana Thimmaraja; 3 October 1433 – May 1478) was the third raja of the Kingdom of Mysore from 1459 until his death in 1478. He was crowned at the age of 25 following his father's death in 1459.

== Corrupt high command ==
The beginnings of the terms of almost all the first five rajas of Mysore are similar in the sense that they represented the Vijayanagara Empire, and in the prosperity of the Vijayanagara Empire lied that of their Mysore Kingdom. Like his father and grandfather, soon after Thimmaraja's becoming Mysore's raja, his boss died. The inefficient and corrupt Vijayanagara Emperor Mallikarjuna Raya died. Both the Vijayanagara Empire and Mysore Kingdom had begun to witness continual rule of kings. However, with the death of Mallikarjuna Raya, his cousin Virupaksha Raya II took the opportunity to seize the throne, though he failed to prove a better ruler. His rule continued through Thimmaraja's reign.

== Beginning of threats to Vijayanagara from all corners ==
The Mughal rulers had occupied most of North India, ravaging through Hindu kingdoms one after another. Muhammad Shah Bahmani II of the Bahmani Sultanate had voraciously expanded his domain, beginning to march down South. His intimidation of Vijayanagara was imminent. To the empire's east was the Kalinga king Raja Purushottama Gajapati Kapilendra of Odisha. He successfully invaded parts of the empire, which Virupaksha could not keep in check. This was also the time the Portuguese arrived in India, marking the beginning of onslaught of European invasions. They began seizing ports from both the peripheries of southern India: present-day coastal Andhra and Karnataka. Virupaksha lost several ports to the Portuguese.

This was a reckoning for Mysore to contemplate and act swiftly. Before Thimmaraja could act strongly, he died in 1478, having served under two emperors: Mallikarjuna Raya and his cousin, Virupaksha Raya II. His 19-year kingship was akin to his forefathers' in terms of incorporating more villages and townships. However, stronger actions were called for during his last times.

== See also ==
- Wodeyar dynasty
- Bahmani Sultanate
- Maharaja of Mysore
- Kingdom of Mysore
