= Achyutarayabhyudayam =

16th-century Sanskrit poem on Achyuta Deva Raya

- Author: Rajanatha Dindima
- Original title: अच्युतरायाभ्युदयम्
- Language: Sanskrit
- Subject: Reign and southern campaign of Achyuta Deva Raya
- Genre: Mahākāvya
- Published: c. 1536 – c. 1542 (composition)
- Publication place: Vijayanagara Empire

Achyutarayabhyudayam (Sanskrit: अच्युतरायाभ्युदयम्, IAST: Acyutarāyābhyudayam, "The Exaltation of Achyuta Raya"), also Achyutarayabhyudaya, is a sixteenth-century Sanskrit mahakavya by Rajanatha Dindima, a member of the Gauḍa Ḍiṇḍima family of scholars associated with the Vijayanagara Empire. Comprising twelve cantos, the poem celebrates the accession and early reign of Achyuta Deva Raya, the successor of Krishnadevaraya. Lidia Sudyka dates its composition to between 1536 and 1542, while observing that its presentation of historical events is shaped by the conventions of royal praise.

== Contents ==
The poem opens with Achyuta's ancestry, birth and youth before turning to his succession to the Vijayanagara throne. Its principal narrative concerns the southern expedition prompted by the revolt of Cellapa, identified with Vīra Narasiṃha Sāḷuva Daṇḍanāyaka. From Vijayanagara, Achyuta travels to Chandragiri and then through Tirupati, Srikalahasti, Kanchipuram and Tiruvannamalai before reaching Srirangam. Rājanātha gives comparatively little space to warfare; temples, ritual worship, gifts and sacred places instead make the royal progress resemble a pilgrimage through South India.

At Srirangam, Achyuta entrusts the continuation of the campaign to his brother-in-law Cinna Tirumala. Tirumala marches past Madurai towards the Tāmraparṇī, where the poem records the defeat and submission of the Cēra ruler. He then worships at Anantaśayanam, identified with Thiruvananthapuram, and returns by way of Rameswaram.

== Historical context ==
The work belongs to the early reign of Achyuta Deva Raya, who succeeded Krishnadevaraya in 1529. Although composed as a courtly mahakavya, it preserves names, places and episodes connected with contemporary political and religious life. Sudyka notes that inscriptions corroborate several events and instances of Achyuta's temple patronage, but do not confirm every stage of Rājanātha's itinerary. The poem therefore combines historical material with a literary sacred geography in which royal authority is expressed through pilgrimage, patronage and victory.

== Manuscripts and editions ==
The first printed part of the work, containing cantos 1–6 with commentary by R. V. Krishnamachariar, appeared at Srirangam in 1907. Its preface records the use of six manuscripts: four from Tanjore, one from Adyar and one from the Government Oriental Manuscripts Library.

S. Krishnaswami Aiyangar later reproduced an abridged account and extracts from the poem in Sources of Vijayanagar History (1919), pp. 158–169. Cantos 7–12 were subsequently edited by A. N. Krishna Aiyangar and published by the Adyar Library in 1945 as no. 49 of its series.
