= Tirumalamba =

Vijayanagaran Polymath

Empress Consort of the Vijayanagara Empire Tirumalamba
- Era: Vijayanagara period
- Known for: Poetry; singing; philanthropy; Hindu philosophy; linguistics
- Notable work: Varadambika Parinaya
- Spouse: Emperor Achyuta Deva Raya
- Relatives: Murtimamba (sister); Sevappa Nayaka (brother-in-law)
- Family: Pandya

Tirumalamba, also known as Oduva Tirumalamba, was an Indian polymath, polyglot and philanthropist of the Vijayanagara period who was active as a poet, a musician, a grammarian and a Hindu scholar. She is chiefly remembered for composing Varadambika Parinaya, a Kavya on the wedding of the Emperor Achyuta Deva Raya and Salaga Princess Varadambika, in Sanskrit. It was the only Sanskrit romance to be written by a woman. She also knew many scripts and coined the largest word of her time.

She also became an empress of the Emperor Achyuta as noted in the epilogue of Varadambika Parinaya where she is described as the "confidante and the be-all and the end-all of the deepest love of Emperor Achyutaraya" and substantiated by other primary sources. Scholar Lakshman Sarup theorizes that Tirumalamba is the unnamed daughter of a Pandya vassal who wed emperor Achyuta mentioned in a Kanchi Inscription.
