= Saluva dynasty =

Second dynasty of the Vijayanagara Empire (c. 1485–1505 CE)

The Saluva dynasty was the second dynasty to rule the Vijayanagara Empire and was created by the Saluvas, who by historical tradition were natives of the Kalyani region of northern Karnataka in modern India. The Gorantla inscription traces their origins to this region from the time of the Western Chalukyas and Kalachuris of Karnataka. The term "Saluva" is known to lexicographers as "hawk" used in hunting. They later spread into the east coast of modern Andhra Pradesh, perhaps by migration or during the Vijayanagara conquests during the 14th century.

The earliest known Saluva from inscriptional evidence in the Vijayanagara era was Mangaladeva, the great-grandfather of Saluva Narasimha Deva Raya. Mangaladeva played an important role in the victories of Emperor Bukka Raya I against the Turko-Persian Sultanate of Madurai. His descendants founded the Saluva Dynasty and became one of the ruling lines of the Vijayanagara Empire. Three emperors ruled from 1485 to 1505 after which the Tuluva Dynasty won the throne. They ruled almost the entire Southern India with Vijayanagara as their imperial capital.

Saluva Narasimha Deva Raya, son of Saluva Gunda who was the Governor of Chandragiri, was the first Emperor of Vijayanagara from the dynasty ruling from 1486 to 1491 CE. Narasimha spent his reign in relatively successful campaigns to subdue rebellious vassals throughout the empire and in unsuccessful attempts to stop the expansion of the Gajapati Empire. Narasimha also opened new ports on the empire's western coast so that he could revive the horse trade, which had fallen into Bahmani hands.

On his death in 1491, following the siege of Udayagiri and his own imprisonment there by Gajapatis, Narasimha left his empire in the able hands of his prime minister, Narasa Nayaka. The emperor did not think his sons were ready to take charge of the throne so he gave that power to his most trusted general and minister Narasa. Narasa in effect ruled the Vijayanagara empire from 1490 until his own death in 1503, after which Narasa's eldest son had the rightful king assassinated and took the throne. Narasimha's eldest son, Thimma Bhupala, had been assassinated by an army commander loyal to the Sangamas and one of Narasa's enemies in 1492 so Narasimha's youngest son, Narasimha Raya II, ascended to the throne as Emperor. He was enthroned as Immadi Narasimha. Although he was named emperor, the authentic control came from Narasa's eldest son and successor, known as Vira Narasimha. He ordered the assassination of Immadi Narasimha in 1505. He then ascended the throne and inaugurated the Tuluva dynasty, the third dynasty of the Vijayanagara Empire and reigned from 1503 to 1509.

== List of rulers ==
- Saluva Narasimha Deva Raya (1485–1491 CE), first ruler
- Thimma Bhupala (1491 CE)
- Narasimha Raya II (1491–1505 CE), last ruler

== Architecture ==
Chaturmukha Basadi, Gerusoppa was constructed during the reign of Saluva dynasty.

== See also ==
- Vijaynagar Empire
- Rani Chennabhairadevi

== Notes ==
- WebPage by Dr. Jyothsna Kamat
- Durga Prasad, History of the Andhras Till 1565 A.D., P. G. Publishers, Guntur
- WebPage by Britannica
