= Ummathur =

- village
- Location in Karnataka, India Ummathur (India)
- Coordinates: 11.94°N 76.95°E
- Country: India
- State: Karnataka
- District: Chamarajanagar
- Talukas: Chamarajanagar

Government
  - Body: Gram panchayat

Population (2001)
  - Total: 5,231

Languages
  - Official: Kannada
- Time zone: UTC+5:30 (IST)
- ISO 3166 code: IN-KA
- Vehicle registration: KA 10
- Nearest city: Mysore
- Lok Sabha constituency: Chamarajanagar
- Website: karnataka.gov.in

Ummathur is a village in the southern state of Karnataka, India.This historical village was once a capital of the Ummathur Province of the Vijayanagara Empire It is located in the Chamarajanagar taluk of Chamarajanagar district in Karnataka. It is situated in the Kollegal - Nanjangud road and is the last village of the Santhe Marahalli Constituency.

Ummathur is a head village for nearby hamlets like Linganapura, Vomma, Hanumanapura.

== Temples ==
Ummathur has several notable old temples including a Jain Basadi.

== Demographics ==
As of 2001 India census, Ummathur had a population of 5231 with 2580 males and 2651 females.

== See also ==
- Chamarajanagar
- Districts of Karnataka
