= Saluva Narasimha Deva Raya =

Emperor of Vijayanagara from 1485 to 1491

- Emperor

Emperor of Vijayanagara
- Reign: c. 1485 – c. 1491
- Predecessor: Praudha Raya
- Successor: Thimma Bhupala
- Born: 1431
- Died: 1491 (aged 59–60); Vijayanagara, Vijayanagara Empire (present-day Hampi, Karnataka, India)
- Issue: Thimma Bhupala; Narasimha Raya II
- Dynasty: Saluva
- Father: Saluva Gunda (the Governor of Chandragiri)
- Religion: Hinduism

Saluva Narasimha Deva Raya (1431–1491), also known as Saluva Narasimha and Saluva Narasimha I, was the founder of the Saluva dynasty of the Vijayanagara Empire, and ruled from 1485 until his death in 1491. In 1452, he was conferred the title Maha Mandaleshwara of Chandragiri during the reign of emperor Mallikarjuna Raya. His father Saluva Gaunda was the governor of Chandragiri.

After the death of Virupaksha Raya II and the ascension of Praudha Raya as the new Emperor of Vijayanagara, the empire plunged into neglect and anarchy. Seeing that a military coup was the only hope to save the realm, Narasimha dispatched the son of Tuluva Isvara Nayaka, Tuluva Narasa Nayaka to the imperial capital of Vijayanagara. The incumbent emperor Praudha Raya fell, thus starting the rule of Saluva Narasimha I. The writings of Nuniz gives a graphic account of how Narasa Nayaka went to Vijayanagara and found it completely unguarded, even all the way to the harem.

As emperor, Saluva Narasimha tried to expand the empire, though he continually faced difficulties caused from similarly rebelling governors. By 1491, he had lost Udayagiri to the Gajapati Monarch Purushottama Deva while the Chiefs of Ummattur in the Mysore region, Saluvas of Hadavalli and Santharas of Karkala from coastal Karnataka region, Srirangapatna and Sambetas of Peranipadu in Cuddapah still remained threats to the empire.

A Saluva Narasimha Raya patron of the Madhwa saint Sripadaraya, he authored the Sanskrit work Rama Bhyudayam. He also patronised Kannada poet Kavi Linga.

Saluva Narasimha's war with the Gajapatis over Udayagiri in 1489 proved disastrous when he was taken prisoner and released only after giving up the fort and surrounding areas to the Gajapatis of Orissa. However, he was successful in conquering the western ports of Kannada country of Mangalore, Bhatkal, Honnavar and Bakanur. This success enabled him to trade for swift horses with the Arabs. He took more efforts in the upkeep of his cavalry and army in general.

Saluva Narasimha would die in 1491 with sons that were too young to ascend to the throne. Their guardianship was entrusted to Narasa Nayaka, a loyal general and minister from the Tuluva family.

== Notes ==
Preceded by Praudha Raya	Vijayanagar empire 1485–1491	Succeeded by Tuluva Narasa Nayaka
