= Thimma Bhupala =

Emperor of Vijayanagara in 1491

Emperor of Vijayanagara
- Reign: 1491
- Predecessor: Saluva Narasimha Deva Raya
- Successor: Narasimha Raya II
- Regent: Tuluva Narasa Nayaka
- Died: 1491
- Dynasty: Saluva
- Father: Saluva Narasimha Deva Raya
- Religion: Jainism

Thimma Bhupala (reigned 1491) was the elder son and heir-apparent of Saluva Narasimha Deva Raya, the Sovereign of the Vijayanagara Empire. During the reign of his father, he held the office of the Yuvaraja. Prince Thimma succeeded his father in 1491 but was soon assassinated by an army commander loyal to the Sangamas during a period of political unrest in Vijayanagara. He was succeeded by his younger brother Narasimha Raya II. The eldest son of his Saluva Narasimha Deva Raya's prime minister, Narasa Nayaka, had Narasimha Raya II assassinated and ascended to the throne himself in 1505, beginning the Tuluva dynasty, the third dynasty of the Vijayanagara Empire.

Saluva rulers were originally Jains who ruled Vijayanagara until 1505 and are associated with the construction of several Jain basadis in the Nagire (Nagarakere) province, including the Chaturmukha Basadi, Gerusoppa.

== Notes ==
Preceded by Saluva Narasimha Deva Raya	Vijayanagar empire 1491 –1491	Succeeded by Narasimha Raya II
