= Narasimha Raya II =

Emperor of Vijayanagara from 1491 to 1505

- Emperor

Emperor of Vijayanagara
- Reign: 1491–1505
- Predecessor: Thimma Bhupala
- Successor: Vira Narasimha Raya
- Born: 1468
- Died: 1505 (aged 36–37); Penukonda, Vijayanagara Empire (modern-day Andhra Pradesh, India)
- Dynasty: Saluva
- Father: Saluva Narasimha I
- Religion: Jainism

Narasimha Raya II (1468–1505), also known as Narasimha II, Immadi Narasimha Raya and Dhamma Thimma Raya, was the third and last emperor from the Saluva dynasty, the second of the four dynasties to rule the Vijayanagara Empire.

== Background ==
Narasimha's father, also named Narasimha, had begun his career as an army general serving the Sangama dynasty, the dynasty that had founded the empire in the 14th century. Saluva rulers were originally Jains who ruled Vijayanagara until 1505 and are associated with the construction of several Jain basadis in the Nagire (Nagarakere) province, including the Chaturmukha Basadi, Gerusoppa. The Sangama dynasty had been gradually weakening over time for a variety of reasons, and in 1485, the senior Narasimha had usurped the throne after capturing the capital and driving out his former overlord, Sangama Praudha Raya. The actual military campaign for this purpose had been carried out by his loyal subordinate, Tuluva Narasa Nayaka.

The senior Narasimha was crowned Emperor and became known as Saluva Narasimha Deva Raya. He died in 1491, only six years after usurping the throne, and left behind two young sons as his heirs. On his deathbed, he entrusted the young boys to the care of his trusted subordinate, Tuluva Narasa Nayaka. The elder son, Thimma Bhupala, was assassinated within a few weeks after his father's death by an army commander loyal to the old Sangama dynasty. This brought the second son, Narasimha, to the throne.

== Reign ==
Thus, Narasimha II came to the throne following the assassination of his elder brother. He was only a teenager when he was crowned the Emperor of the Vijayanagara, and real power lay in the hands of his guardian, the imperial regent Tuluva Narasa Nayaka. This situation continued for twelve years until Tuluva Narasa Nayaka died in 1503. By this time, Narasimha II was an adult and there was no justification for the appointment of a regent. Nevertheless, the late regent's eldest son, Tuluva Vira Narasimha Raya, remained the power behind the throne due to his control of the army. He compelled Narasimha II to name him the Dalavayi (commander-in-chief of the army) and also the Sarvadhikari ("Administrator General", effectively Regent).

There developed an atmosphere of great tension between the two Narasimhas (Emperor Saluva Narasimha II and his Prime Minister Tuluva Vira Narasimha). Both of them considered that they had a greater right to rule the empire. After all, Narasimha II had become Emperor only because his father had usurped the throne, and that also very recently. That usurpation had in fact been made possible by the efforts and resourcefulness of his trusted general, Tuluva Narasa Nayaka, who had captured the imperial capital in the name of the usurper. Not only that, but Tuluva Narasa Nayaka had also later pacified the country, suppressed the supporters of the old Sangama dynasty, and maintained order during the minority of the usurper's two sons. With all this background, Tuluva Vira Narasimha felt that he had a greater right to rule than the Emperor Narasimha II. Why should he, his sons and grandsons be no more than courtiers serving the upstart dynasty which had been established mainly by the efforts of his own father? The situation was fraught with tension and many resentments.

== Death ==
Finally, in 1505, only two years after the death of the old imperial regent Tuluva Narasa Nayaka, Emperor Narasimha Raya II was assassinated at the fortress of Penukonda, probably by henchmen of Vira Narasimha Raya. With his death ended the reign of the Saluva dynasty, whose three emperors (father and two sons) had reigned for a total of only twenty years.

Upon Emperor Narasimha II's death, his Dalavayi Tuluva Vira Narasimha Raya was proclaimed the Emperor of Vijayanagara and the Tuluva dynasty rose to power.

== Notes ==
Preceded by Thimma Bhupala	Vijayanagar empire 1491 –1505	Succeeded by Tuluva Narasa Nayaka
