= Tuluva dynasty =

Third dynasty of Vijayanagara empire (c. 1491–1570 CE)

- Country: Vijayanagara Empire
- Founded: 1491
- Seat: Vijayanagara
- Dissolution: 1570

Tuluva is the name of the third dynasty of the Vijayanagara Empire. The dynasty traces its patrilineal ancestry to Tuluva Narasa Nayaka, a powerful warlord from the westerly Tulu speaking region. His son Narasimha Nayaka arranged for the assassination of the weak Narasimha Raya II bringing an end to the rule of the Saluva dynasty. Narasimha Nayaka later assumed the Vijayangara throne as Viranarasimha Raya bringing the Tuluva dynasty to prominence. The dynasty was at its zenith during the rule of Krishnadevaraya, the second son of Tuluva Narasa Nayaka.

== History ==
A epigraph on the eastern wall of Tirumala temple describes the genealogy of Krishnadevaraya. The first ancestor of the Tuluva lineage to be mentioned is Timmabhupati and his wife Devaki. Timmabhupati is followed by his son Ishvara and consort Bukkamma and then a certain Narasa Bhupala who is none other than Tuluva Narasa Nayaka, the father of Emperor Krishnadevaraya. The powerful warlord Tuluva Narasa Nayaka is attributed with the conquest of the Gajapatis as well as certain Muslim rulers.

Krishnadevaraya is known to have patronised poets and issued inscriptions in languages as varied as Tamil, Kannada and Telugu. However, he elevated Telugu as a royal language possibly because of the dominance of Telugu speaking chiefs and composed the epic poem Amuktamalyada in it. Tuluva rulers were staunch Vaishnavas and patronised Vaishnavism. Vyasatirtha, a Kannadiga Dvaita saint was the Kulaguru of Krishnadevaraya.

The fall of the Tuluva dynasty led to the beginning of the disintegration of the Vijayanagar empire.

== List of rulers ==
Name	Birth	Reign	Death
Tuluva Narasa Nayaka		1491–1503	1503
Viranarasimha Raya		1505–17 July 1509	17 July 1509
Krishnadevaraya	17 January 1471	26 July 1509 – 17 October 1529	17 October 1529
Achyuta Deva Raya		30 November 1529 – June 1542	June 1542
Venkata I		1542–1542 (killed in only 6 months)	1542
Sadasiva Raya		1542–1570	1570

== See also ==
- Vijayanagar Empire
