= Viranarasimha Raya =

Emperor of Vijayanagara from 1505 to 1509

Vira Narasimha III
- Emperor

Emperor of Vijayanagara
- Reign: c. 1505–17 July 1509
- Predecessor: Narasimha Raya II
- Successor: Krishnadevaraya
- Died: 17 July 1509
- Dynasty: Tuluva
- Father: Tuluva Narasa Nayaka
- Religion: Hinduism

Vira Narasimha Raya, also known as Vira Narasimha or Vira Narasimha III, (reigned 1505–17 July 1509) became the Emperor of Vijayanagara after the death of his predecessor Narasimha Raya II. He was the older half-brother of Krishnadevaraya.

The assassination of Tuluva Narasa Nayaka resulted in feudatories rising in rebellion everywhere. In his writings, Fernão Nunes noted that the whole world had risen in rebellion. At first, Immadi Narasa Nayaka, the eldest son of Saluva Narasa Nayaka became the Emperor and lasted on the throne for two years before being assassinated. Vira Narasimha Raya succeeded him in 1505 CE and spent all his years fighting rebel warlords.

The Turko-Persian Sultan Yusuf Adil Khan of Bijapur who assassinated the Regent Narasa Nayaka and 40 other imperial officers tried to extend his domains south of the Tungabhadra. The new Regent of Vijayanagara Empire was supported by Aliya Rama Raya of the Aravidu family and his son Thimma. With their help, Adil Shah was defeated and driven out. Adoni and Kurnool areas were annexed into Vijayanagara Empire. During this time, the governor of Ummathur rose again in revolt and Vira Narasimha Raya set out south to quell the rebellion, having placed his half-brother Krishnadevaraya as the emperor in absence. Portuguese Empire assisted Emperor Vira Narasimha's forces in this conflict, providing horses and artillery, in exchange seeking control of the port of Bhatkal. Concerted efforts by Vira Narasimha Raya to quell the rebellion in Ummatur had mixed results.

In 1509 CE, when on his death bed, legend has it that Vira Narasimha Raya requested his minister Saluva Timma (Timmarasa) to blind his younger brother Krishna Deva Raya so that his own eight-year-old son could be crowned the Emperor of Vijayanagara. Timmarasa however brought a pair of she-goat eyes to the Emperor and informed him that he had Krishna Deva Raya killed. However, there is no record to prove anything but a friendly relationship between the two half brothers and that the coronation of Krishna Deva Raya was a smooth one.

== Notes ==
Preceded by Tuluva Narasa Nayaka	Vijayanagar Empire; 1503–1509	Succeeded by Krishnadevaraya
