= Tuluva Narasa Nayaka =

Regent of the Vijayanagara Empire from 1491 to 1503

- Mahapradhana; Rashtrakarta; Senadhipati; Swami; Karyakarta

Regent of Vijayanagara Empire
- Reign: 1491–1503
- Successor: Viranarasimha Raya
- Died: 1503; Bijapur, Adil Shahi Sultanate (present-day Vijayapura, Karnataka, India)
- Spouse: Tippambika; Nagala Devi; Obamamba
- Issue: Viranarasimha Raya (from Tippambika); Krishnadevaraya (from Nagala Devi); Achyuta Deva Raya (from Obamamba)
- Father: Tuluva Isvara Nayaka
- Mother: Bukkamma
- Monarch: Narasimha Raya II

Personal details
- Cause of death: Assassination
- Profession: Imperial Regent, Prime Minister, Commander-in-chief, Protector of the Realm to Narasimha Raya II
- Military career
- Allegiance: Vijayanagara Empire
- Service years: 1463–1503

Tuluva Narasa Nayaka was an Indian general and later an imperial regent who founded the Tuluva dynasty of the Vijayanagara Empire. He was the father of the emperors Viranarasimha Raya, Krishnadevaraya and Achyuta Deva Raya.

== Biography ==
Tuluva Narasa Nayaka, like his father Tuluva Isvara Nayaka, was a general of the Vijayanagara Empire. After the death of the Emperor Saluva Narasimha I in 1491 CE, the crown prince Thimma Bhupala was assassinated by an army commander. The faithful Narasa Nayaka then crowned the other prince, Narasimha Raya II, but retained all administrative powers in order to bring stability to the Empire. He was called the Rakshakarta (lit. 'Protector of the realm') and Svami (lit. 'Lord'). He held the offices of the Senadhipati (lit. 'Commander-in-chief'), Mahapradhana (lit. 'Prime Minister') and Karyakarta (lit. 'Agent of the Emperor'). He successfully kept the Turco-Persian Bahamani Sultanate and the Gajapatis away from the Empire and quelled many rebellions by unfaithful chieftains trying to exert their independence.

=== Capture of Narasimha Raya II ===
After the death of Emperor Saluva Narasimha Deva Raya in 1491, Crown Prince Thimma Bhupala was assassinated by an army commander. The faithful Narasa Nayaka then crowned the other prince, Narasimha Raya II. Narasimha II was a teenager when he became Emperor of the Vijayanagara Empire. Despite becoming emperor, real power laid in the hands of his guardian, Narasa Nayaka, who retained all administrative powers in order to bring stability to the empire.

In 1494, Narasa captured Narasimha II at the Penukonda Fort. Narasa Nayaka then reigned over the Vijayanagara Empire in disguise of Narasimha Raya II.

=== Victory over the south ===
==== Hoysala campaign ====
In August 1463, when the Vijayanagara Empire was ruled by Saluva Narasimha Deva Raya, the region south of the Kaveri river slipped out of Vijayanagara control while the Emperor was busy protecting interests closer to the capital. In 1496, General Narasa Nayaka marched south and brought under control rebellious chiefs like the governor of Trichi named Salas Rai and Tanjore named Vikram Shah. The whole area south of Kaveri to Cape Comorin was brought under control. The chiefs of Chola, Chera, Madurai area, Heuna or Hoysala chief of Srirangapatna and Gokarna on the west coast were brought under the Vijayanagara empire in one long successful campaign which ended in May 1497.

==== Resistance to Gajapati Prataparudra Deva ====
On 27 November 1496, the Gajapati monarch Prataparudra Deva attacked the Vijayanagara Empire and advanced up to Pennar but Narasa Nayaka held out and achieved a stalemate. He was succeeded by his eldest son Viranarasimha Raya in 1503 .

=== Conflict with the Bahmani Sultanate and death ===
Ongoing internal strife in the Vijayanagara Empire and tenuous central control gave independent sultans of the divided Bahmani Sultanate an opportunity to take advantage of the situation. Mahmood Shah, citing unspecified reasons, marched against Vijayanagara, breaking the existing peace. The sultanate army advanced to Hutgi, joined forces with contingents from other Turco-Persian tradition sultanates. It split into two groups, and one moved towards Vijayanagara through Gulbarga, while Mahmood Shah led the other to besiege Raichur in the Krishna-Tungabhadra Doab region. No decisive battle took place, and a peace agreement was reached. Vijayanagara ceded Raichur and Mudgal to Yusuf Adil Shah of the Bijapur Sultanate. Tuluva Narasa Nayaka understood the precarious situation and chose not to engage the combined armies of the Shahi kingdom on two fronts simultaneously.

Tuluva Narasa Nayaka was an astute ruler who wasted no time in strengthening the empire. As the Bahmani Sultanate began to splinter into smaller states, a Bahmani minister, Qasim Barid I, approached Narasa with a proposal. He offered Narasa the forts of Mudgal and Raichur in exchange for his assistance in a war against Yusuf Adil Shah of Bijapur. Narasa Nayaka accepted the offer and sent his army to the region surrounding Raichur Doab. His forces were able to defeat Yusuf Adil Shah. However, in a treacherous turn of events, Yusuf Adil Shah plotted against Tuluva Narasa Nayaka and had him and his seventy high-ranking officers murdered. Despite this, Yusuf Adil Shah managed to reclaim the Doab area and Mudgal from the Vijayanagara Empire in 1502.

== Notes ==
| Preceded by Saluva Narasimha Deva Raya | Vijayanagar empire 1491–1503 | Succeeded by Viranarasimha Raya |
