= List of Vijayanagara emperors =

Emperor of Karnata
- Imperial
- Last to reign Sriranga III; 29 October 1642–1646

Details
- Style: His Imperial Majesty
- First monarch: Harihara I
- Last monarch: Sriranga III
- Formed: 18 April 1336; 690 years ago
- Abolished: 1646; 379–380 years ago
- Residences: Vijayanagara (1336–1565); Penukonda (1565–1592); Chandragiri (1592–1604); Vellore (1604–1646)
- Appointer: Hereditary
- Pretender: Nayaka dynasties

The Vijayanagara Empire (1336–1646) was the most prominent medieval Hindu empire of southern India. It was established on the banks of Tungabhadra River in present-day Karnataka and consisted of parts or all of the modern states of Karnataka, Andhra Pradesh, Tamil Nadu, Kerala, Goa and some parts of Telangana, Maharashtra and Sri Lanka. The Vijayanagara Empire was established in 1336 by the brothers Harihara I and Bukka Raya I of the Sangama dynasty.

Under the rule of Krishnadevaraya, the empire reached its peak. The empire lasted until 1646, although its power greatly declined after a major military defeat in the Battle of Talikota in 1565 by the combined armies of the Deccan sultanates.

The Vijayanagara emperors used the titles of Maharajadhiraj ("Great King of Kings"), Cakravartin ("Universal Monarch"), Devaraya ("God-King"), etc.

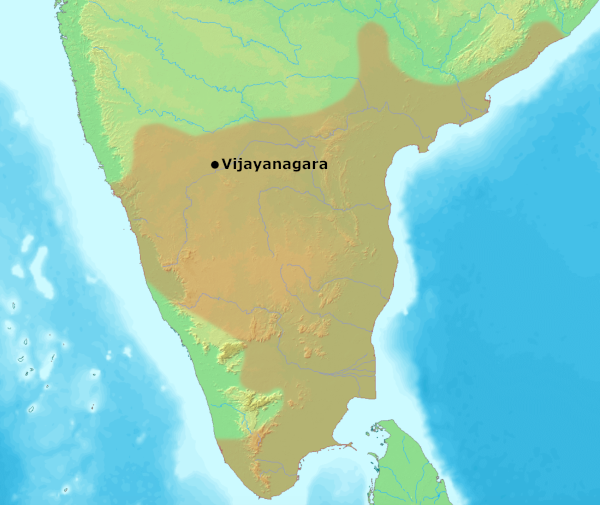
Expansion of Vijayanagara empire under Sangama rulers

== Family trees ==
=== Sangama dynasty ===
Sangama dynasty

Bhavana; Sangama
Harihara I^{(1)} r. 1336–1356	Bukka; Raya I^{(2)} r. 1356–1377
Harihara II^{(3)} r. 1377–1404
Virupaksha; Raya I^{(4)} r. 1404–1405	Bukka; Raya II^{(5)} r. 1405–1406	Deva; Raya I^{(6)} r. 1406–1422
Ramachandra; Raya^{(7)} r. 1422	Bukka; Raya III^{(8)} r. 1422–1424
Deva; Raya II^{(9)} r. 1424–1446
Deva; Raya III^{(10)} r. 1446–1465	Son of Deva Raya
Virupaksha; Raya II^{(11)} r. 1465–1485
Praudha; Deva Raya; IV^{(12)} r. 1485

=== Saluva dynasty ===
Saluva dynasty

Saluva; Narasimha; Raya I^{(13)} r. 1485–1491
Thimma; Bhupala^{(14)} r. 1491	Narasimha; Raya II^{(15)} r. 1491–1505

=== Tuluva dynasty ===
Tuluva dynasty

Tuluva; Narasa; Nayaka^{(16)} r. 1491–1503
Narasimha; Raya III^{(17)} r. 1503–1509	Krishna; Deva Raya^{(18)} r. 1509–1529	Achyuta; Deva Raya^{(19)} r. 1529–1542	Son of Tuluva; Narasa; Nayaka
Venkata; Raya I^{(20)} r. 1542	Sadasiva; Raya^{(21)} r. 1542–1569

=== Aravidu dynasty ===
Aravidu dynasty

Rama Raya^{(22)} r. 1542–1565	Tirumala; Deva Raya^{(23)} r. 1565–1572
Son of Rama Raya	Sriranga; Deva Raya I^{(24)} r. 1572–1586	Rama Deva	Venkata; Raya II^{(25)} r. 1586–1614
Venkata; Raya III^{(28)} r. 1632–1642	Grandson of Rama Raya	Sriranga; Chika Raya II^{(26)} r. 1614–1617
Sriranga III^{(29)} r. 1642–1652	Rama Deva; Raya^{(27)} r. 1617–1632

== List of Emperors ==
Vijayanagara Empire (1336–1646) was ruled by four different dynasties for about 310 years on entire South India.

=== Sangama dynasty (1336–1485) ===
Serial no.	Regnal names	Reign	Notes
1	Harihara I	18 April 1336 – 20 November 1355	Founder
2	Bukka Raya I	January/February 1356 – 24 February 1377	
3	Harihara II	21 June 1377 – 31 August 1404	
4	Virupaksha Raya	September 1404 – July 1405	
5	Bukka Raya II	27 July 1404 – September 1406	
6	Deva Raya	5 November 1406 – 25 February 1423	
7	Ramachandra Raya	4 April 1423 – 1423	
8	Vira Vijaya Bukka Raya	1422–1424	
9	Deva Raya II	10 February 1423 – 24 May 1446	
10	Mallikarjuna Raya	1446 – 14 July 1465	
11	Virupaksha Raya II	1465–1485	
12	Praudha Raya	1485	

=== Saluva dynasty (1485–1505) ===
Serial no.	Regnal names	Reign	Notes
13	Saluva Narasimha Deva Raya	1485–1491	
14	Thimma Bhupala	1491	
15	Narasimha Raya II	1491–1505	

=== Tuluva dynasty (1491–1570) ===
Serial no.	Regnal names	Reign	Notes
16	Thimma Bhupala	1491–1505	
17	Viranarasimha Raya	1503 – 17 July 1509	
18	Krishnadevaraya	26 July 1509 – 17 October 1529	
19	Achyuta Deva Raya	30 November 1529 – 1542	
20	Venkata I	September 1542 – January 1543	
21	Sadasiva Raya	1542–1570	

=== Aravidu dynasty (1542–1646) ===
Serial no.	Regnal names	Reign	Notes
22	Aliya Rama Raya	1542 – 23 January 1565	
23	Tirumala Deva Raya	1565–1572	
24	Sriranga I	1572–1586	
25	Venkata II	1586 – mid-October 1614	
26	Sriranga II	October 1614 – February 1615	
27	Rama Deva Raya	1617–1632	
28	Venkata III	1632 – 10 October 1642	
29	Sriranga III	29 October 1642 – 1646	

== See also ==
- List of Indian monarchs
