= Society of the Vijayanagara Empire =

The period of the Vijayanagara Empire is considered an age of prosperity in South India in the 14th century CE. Many travelogues written by visitors, ambassadors and authors of that time provide ample proof of a vibrant era. Agriculture was the main sustenance and the Tungabhadra was the life blood of the capital city.

Other major rivers that found their course through this land are the Krishna, Kaveri and Godavari. The most prosperous time during the 230 year rule of the empire was during the rule of the Sangama dynasty of which Deva Raya II was the most successful and during its peak under Krishnadevaraya. Progress was made in building of canals, fortifications, water storage tanks (bunds). Trading from the western sea ports with Europeans and Persians was profitable. Sculptures and quarry workers were in demand due to the prolific temple building activities undertaken.

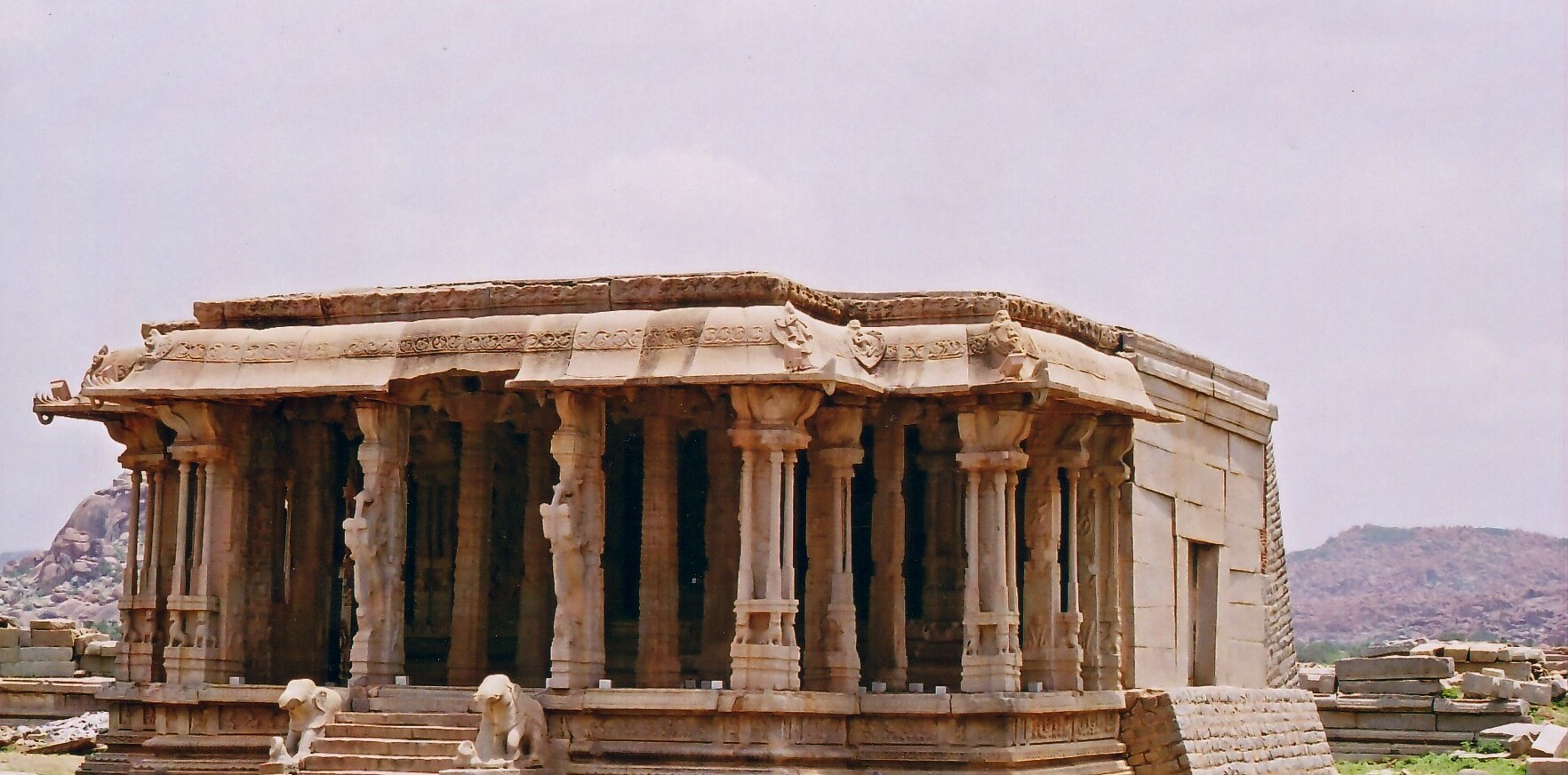
mantapa with elephant parapets to steps, Hampi

== People ==
Women had been achieving freedom for several centuries and continued the tradition. Women wore sarees and blouses while men were dressed only in a lower garment, though stitched clothes like shirts were occasional. Turbans, Pethas and Kulavi were popular headgear among the rich. Men wore jewellery just as women did; finger rings, earrings, necklaces, bangles and bracelets were popular. During celebrations, both men and women wore headbands with flowers and perfumes made of sandal wood, rose water, flowers, civet and musk. The discovery of several Game boards engraved onto boulders; sheet rock, temple flooring provide ample evidence of leisure based activities and social interaction at important public places. While many of these games are still played today, many are still to be identified.

== Administration ==
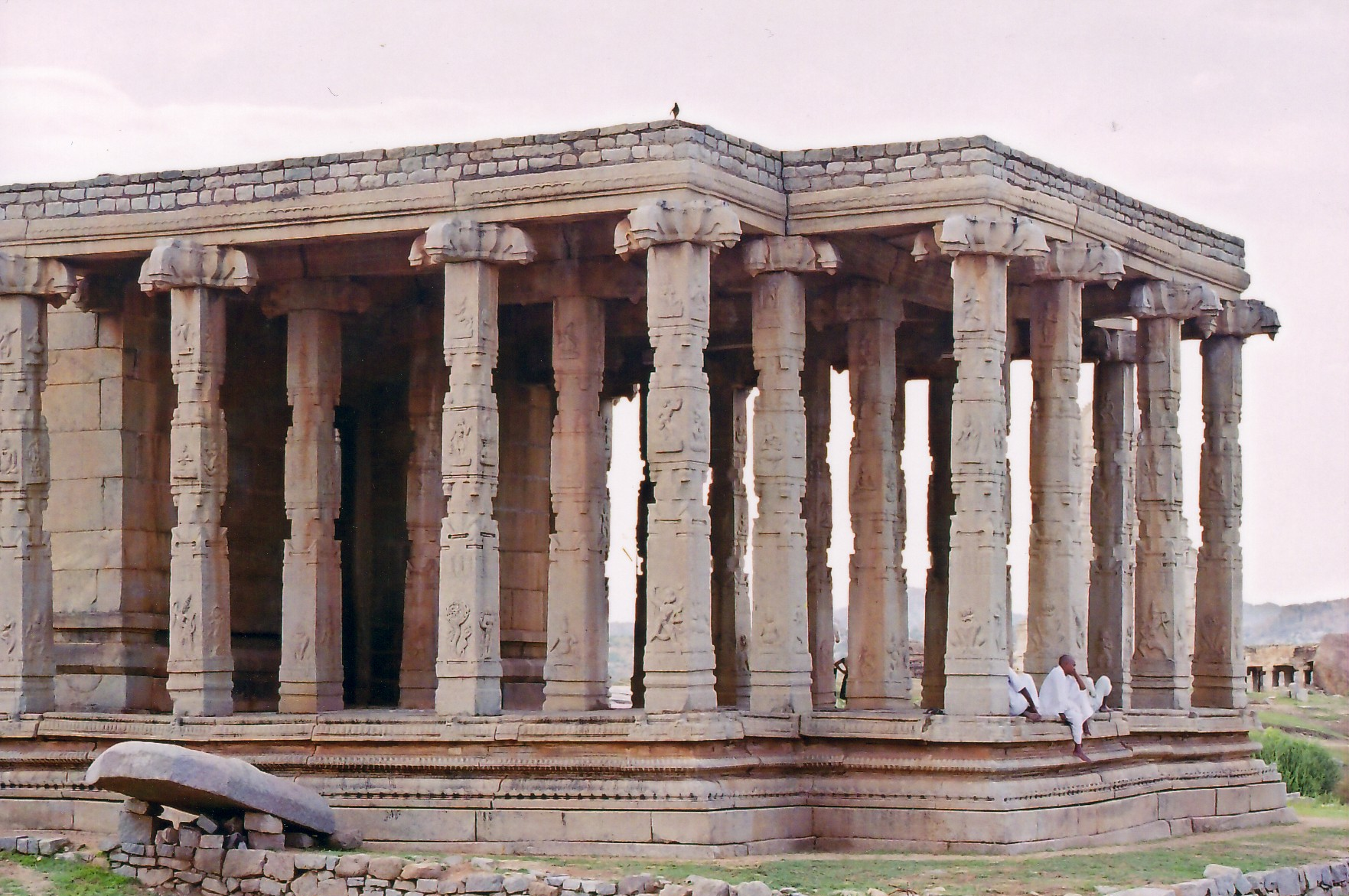
Tall pillars, Sasivekalu Ganesha temple Hampi

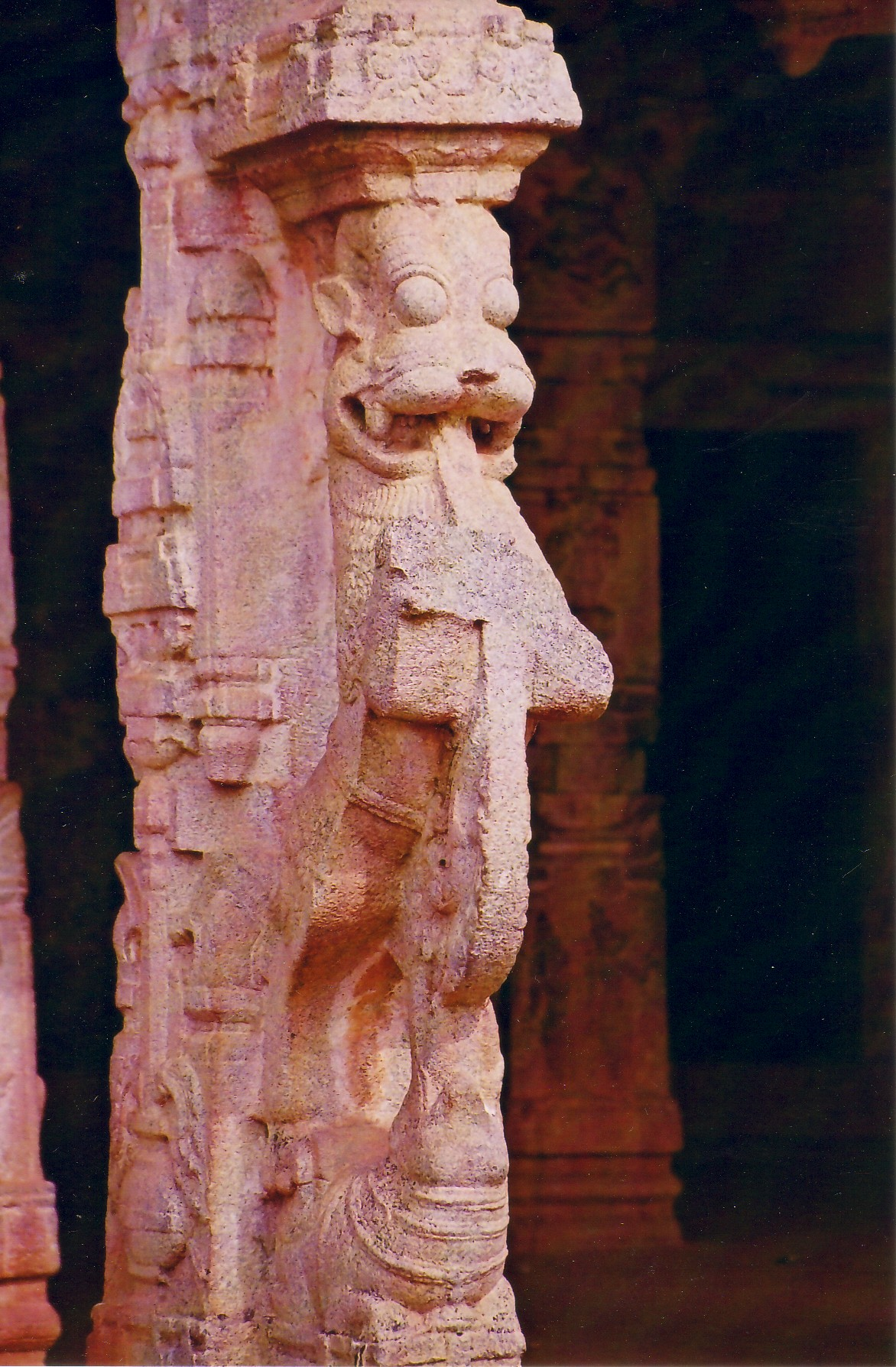
Typical Hippogryph, Hampi

=== Governance ===
In spite of all its glorious achievements in arts and architecture, the empire was essentially a war administration. Every aspect of the governance indicated its sole purpose, that of repulsing Muslim invasion. As the kingdom expanded, it maintained local traditions in areas annexed into the empire. Thus as a whole, the Hoysala, Kakatiya, Sena and Pandya administrative machinery was adjusted to current needs and retained. The government became more decentralized later with more autonomy given to Nayakas and Palyagars. The kings cabinet was composed of Mahapradhana (Prime minister) and several Pradhanas (ministers). All cabinet ranking officials were military trained and given the title Dandanayaka or Dandanatha. Caste was no bar to rise to high military positions and included officers from the Kuruba, Nayaka and Bedas. Kavyakartha was chief secretary to the king and was also called Rayaswami. Navigadaprabhu was the naval chief. The use of paper for administrative purposes was popularised, though about 7000 stone and copper plate inscriptions (Shasana) have been discovered. Taxes were levied on all land revenues. Taxes on homes, trader shops, marriage, toddy, salt and even prostitution has been confirmed.

=== Army ===
There were two types of armies. The republican guard and the feudatory armies which were expected to contribute in case of war. Krishnadevaraya had a standing army of 100,000 infantry, 20,000 horses and 900 elephants. Artillery was in use. Some travelogues speak of an infantry of 1.1 million expandable to 2 million.

=== Provinces ===
The empire was divided into Rajya or Mandala. There were six Rajyas each having its own language.

=== Agriculture and Trade ===
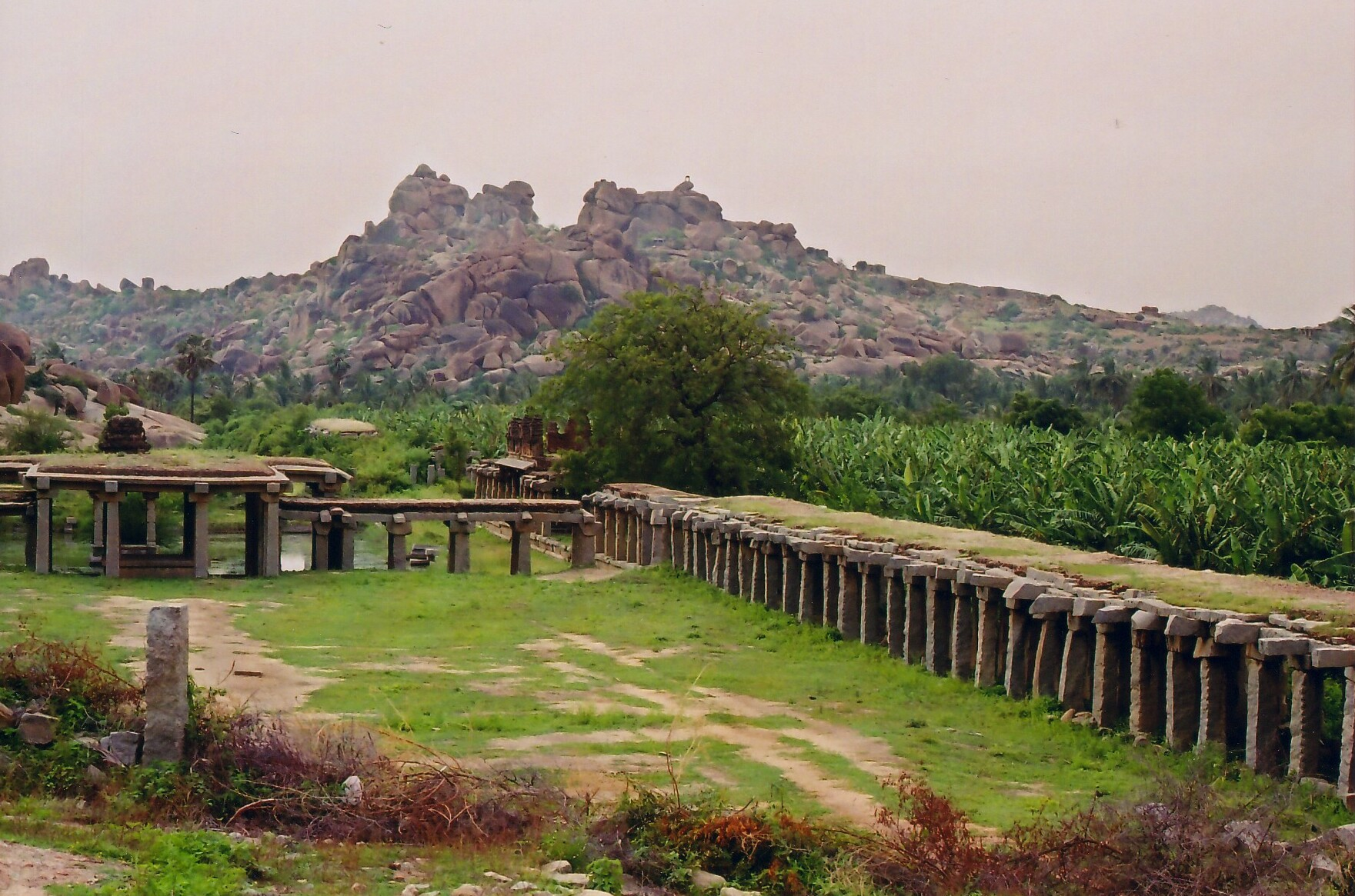
Ancient Market place Hampi

The Tungabhadra river was the lifeline of the capital. Many elaborate and clever canals and Anecut stored and channelled water to the capital. These canals also lead to the cultivable areas in the fortified city and outside. The features were so advanced that many of the ideas were maintained by the Tungabhadra river authority during their projects in the 1950s. The core area urban communities depended on private tanks, communal tanks and bore wells for water. The royal enclosures had the most sophisticated water distribution and recirculation systems. The main water supply to the royal enclosure came from Kamlapuram. Water pipes sealed in brick and lime plaster were used. Water conservation and recirculation had gained importance in these dry areas. Large tanks providing water for irrigation were called Anecut or Bund. There were several irrigated areas within the fortified city making the fortress very self-sufficient and capable of withstanding long sieges. In the empire, the majority of the people were involved in agriculture growing rice, wheat, ragi, cotton, sugarcane and pulses which were popular. There were plantations growing coconut, Areca and Betel. Portuguese influence brought the growth of onion, tobacco and ground nut into practice. Many large tanks called Bukkasamudram, Vyasasamudram, Krishnarayasagara, Sadashivasagara, Maiviru Magada, Kamalapurasagara, Rayavakaluve, Basavanakaluve were constructed. many people adopted many religions. there are variety of religious structures i.e. stupas monasteries and temples. Industries that prospered were cotton textiles, weaving, carpentry, coir work, sculpting, stone quarrying etc. The prolific temple construction activities undertaken provided employment for thousands. Major exports were jaggery, limestone, textiles, salt, sugar, spices from Malnad, iron ore from Kudremukh, gold from Kolar, Hatti and Raichur, diamonds from Telangana area and rice. Major imports were horses from Persia, artillery and cannons, copper, coral, mercury and salt peter from Europe. While ports were humming on both the western and eastern shores, the most important ports were Mangalore, Barkur, Bhatkal, Honavar from where the empire traded with the Europeans and Persians.

== Related links ==
- Vijayanagar coins, Govt. museum, Chennai
- Coins of Vijayanagar Empire
- Vijayanagar Coinage
- History of Karnataka - Mr. Arthikaje,© 1998-00 OurKarnataka.Com,Inc
- Indian Inscriptions - Archaeological Survey Of India
- Vijayanagar Empire, Dr. Jyotsna Kamat
- Incredible India Hampi Guide
- Hampi - History and Tourism
