= Virupaksha Raya =

Emperor of Vijayanagara from 1404 to 1405

Vijayanagara Emperor
- Reign: September 1404 – July 1405
- Predecessor: Harihara II
- Successor: Bukka Raya II
- House: Sangama
- Father: Harihara II

Virupaksha Raya was briefly the emperor of the Vijayanagara Empire from 1404 to 1405.

With the death of Harihara II in 1404, the throne for the Vijayanagara Empire was disputed amongst his sons: Deva Raya I, Bukka Raya II, and Virupaksha Raya. Virupaksha Raya would only rule for a few months before being murdered by his brothers and being succeeded by his brother Bukka Raya II. Bukka Raya II ruled for two years before he was overthrown by his brother Deva Raya I.

Virupaksha's very brief reign was not marked by any significant events or changes. Still noted by the traveller that Virupaksha Raya lost a lot of the kingdom's land such as Goa, Chaul, and Dabhol to the Muslims.
