= Praudha Raya =

Emperor of Vijayanagara in 1485

- Emperor

Emperor of Vijayanagara
- Reign: 1485
- Predecessor: Virupaksha Raya II
- Successor: Saluva Narasimha Deva Raya
- Dynasty: Sangama
- Father: Virupaksha Raya II
- Religion: Hinduism

Praudha Raya (reigned 1485), also known as Praudha Deva Raya IV, was the last Sangama Emperor of Vijayanagara. The king belongs to odeya/ vodeya /vaddi /vadiyaraju's.

His reign was extremely short and he was overpowered by his general Saluva Narasimha Deva Raya in 1485, He was one of his brother lineage, who took over the empire. He wrote Ratiratna Pradipika, a book on eroticism.

Preceded by Virupaksha Raya II	Vijayanagar empire 1485	Succeeded by Saluva Narasimha Deva Raya
