= Harihara II =

Emperor of Vijayanagara from 1377 to 1404

- Vaidikamarga Sthapanacharya; Vedamarga Pravartaka.
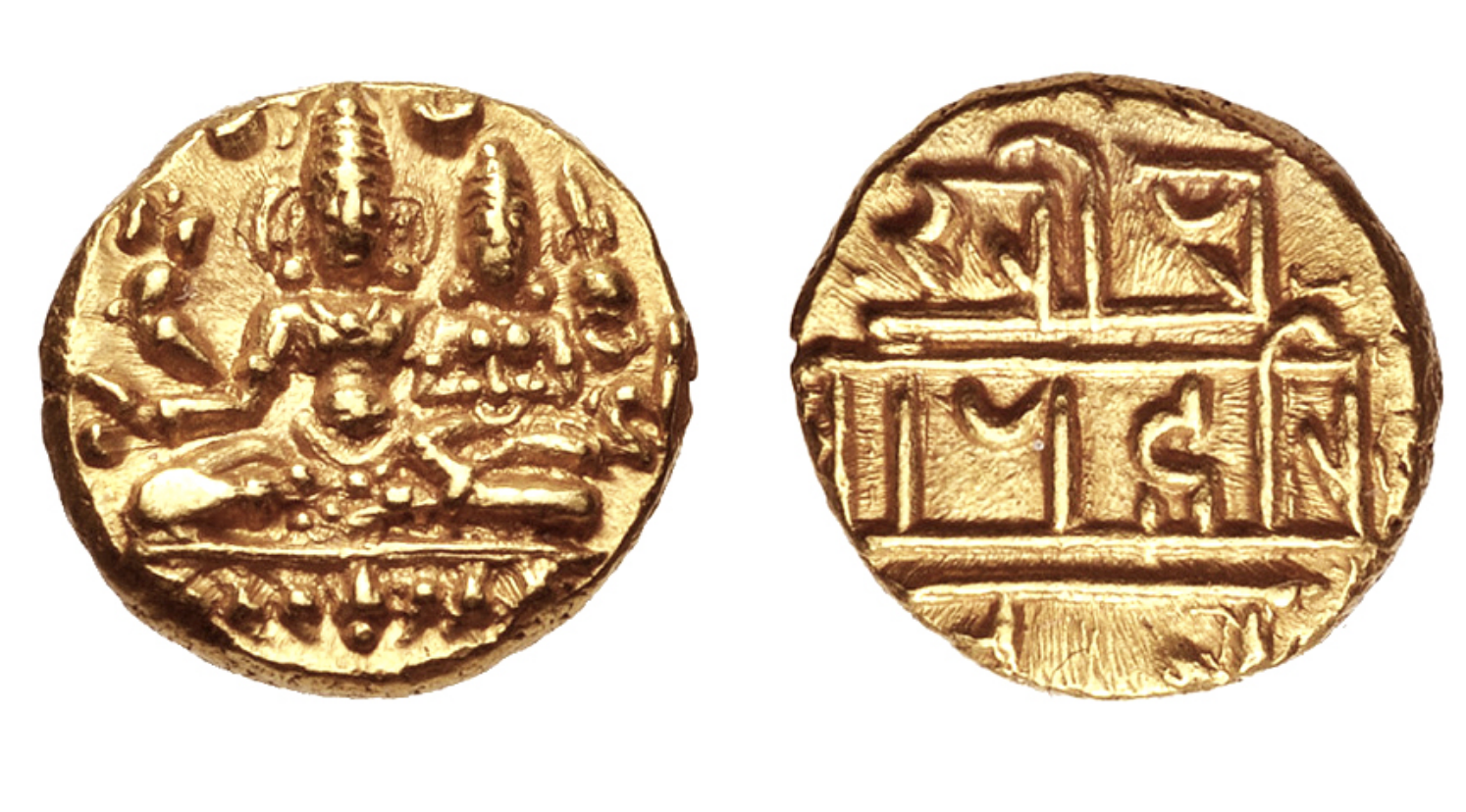
- Gold Pagoda of Harihara II

Vijayanagara Emperor
- Reign: 21 June 1377 – 31 August 1404
- Predecessor: Bukka Raya I
- Successor: Virupaksha Raya
- Born: Vijayanagara, Vijayanagara Empire (modern day Hampi, Karnataka, India)
- Died: 31 August 1404; Vijayanagara, Vijayanagara Empire (modern day Hampi, Karnataka, India)
- Issue: Virupaksha Raya; Bukka Raya II; Deva Raya I
- House: Sangama
- Father: Bukka Raya I
- Religion: Hinduism

Harihara II (died 31 August 1404) was an Emperor of the Vijayanagara Empire from the Sangama Dynasty. He patronised the Kannada poet Madhura, a Jaina. An important work on the Vedas was completed during his time. He earned the titles Vaidikamarga Sthapanacharya and Vedamarga Pravartaka.

== Biography ==
He ascended the throne after the death of his father Bukka Raya I in 1377 and reigned till his death in 1404. He was succeeded by his son Virupaksha Raya.

During his reign, Harihara II continued to extend the empire's territory through fighting against the Reddis of Kondavidu for control of the Andhra between Nellore and Kalinga. From the Reddis of Kondavidu, Harihara II conquered the Addanki and Srisailam areas as well as most of the territory between the peninsula to the south of the river Krishna, which would eventually lead to fights in Telangana with the Velamas of Rachakonda. Harihara II took advantage of the death of Mujahid Bahmani in 1378 and extended his control into the northwest, controlling such ports as Goa, Chaul, and Dabhol.

Harihara II reigned from the capital city of Vijayanagara whose ruins are now known as Hampi. The ruins of Harihara's palace are believed to be located among the Hampi ruins.

His general Iruguppa was a disciple of Simhanandi, a Jain teacher. He built a tank for Gomatteshvara (Bahubali) and the stone temple of Kumthu-Jinanatha in Vijayanagara.

During his fight against the Reddis of Kondavidu, he delegated the rule of Mysore and the task of fighting the Dalvoys in Mysore to Yaduraya, thereby appointing the first ruler of another mighty future-kingdom.

== Sources ==
- Sangave, Vilas Adinath (1981), The Sacred Shravanabelagola (A Socio-Religious Study) (1st ed.), Bharatiya Jnanpith
- Dr. Suryanath U. Kamat, Concise history of Karnataka, MCC, Bangalore, 2001 (Reprinted 2002)
