= Veera Vijaya Bukka Raya =

Emperor of Vijayanagara from 1423 to 1424

Emperor of Vijayanagara
- Reign: c. 1423 – c. 1424 CE
- Predecessor: Ramachandra Raya
- Successor: Deva Raya II
- Born: Vijayanagara, Vijayanagara Empire (modern day Hampi, Karnataka, India)
- Died: Vijayanagara, Vijayanagara Empire (modern day Hampi, Karnataka, India)
- Issue: Deva Raya II
- House: Sangama
- Father: Deva Raya I
- Mother: Unknown
- Religion: Hinduism

Veera Vijaya Bukka Raya (reigned 1423–1424), also known as Bukka Raya III and Vijaya Raya, was an emperor of the Vijayanagara Empire from the Sangama Dynasty.

Vijaya Raya was the son of Deva Raya I and succeeded his brother, Ramachandra Raya, in 1423 as the emperor of the Vijayanagara Empire. Similar to Ramachandra, Vijaya Raya is not known for doing anything significant and his short reign ended in 1424 (though Fernao Nuniz had noted that his reign lasted six years) when he was succeeded by his son, Deva Raya II. Vijaya Raya was the second son of Deva Raya I. During his reign, he faced an invasion from the Bahmani Sultanate, under Ahmad Shah I Wali. In the Siege of Vijayanagar, the Bahmanis defeated Vijayanagar, and recaptured the Sultanate's lost territories.

Preceded by Ramachandra Raya	Vijayanagar empire 1422–1424	Succeeded by Deva Raya II
