= Bukka Raya II =

Emperor of Vijayanagara from 1404 to 1406

Emperor of Vijayanagara
- Reign: 27 July 1404 – September 1406
- Predecessor: Virupaksha Raya
- Successor: Deva Raya I
- Born: 1363
- Died: after 1411
- House: Sangama
- Father: Harihara II

Bukka Raya II (1363–after 1411) was an emperor of the Vijayanagara Empire from the Sangama Dynasty from 1404 until his deposition in 1406.

== Biography ==
After the death of Harihara II in 1404, the succession of the throne was disputed amongst his three sons: Virupaksha Raya, Bukka Raya II, and Deva Raya I and eventually changed hands amongst them. First, Virupaksha Raya managed to rule for a few months before he was murdered by his brothers. Bukka Raya II, who succeeded him as emperor, only reigned for a little more than two years before he was overthrown by his brother Deva Raya I who took the throne in September 1406. Nothing is known of him from 1406 until he made a failed attempt to retake the throne in 1411. After his failed attempt, he disappears from records.

== See also ==
- Kalya Inscriptions
