= Harihara I =

Emperor of Vijayanagara from 1336 to 1355

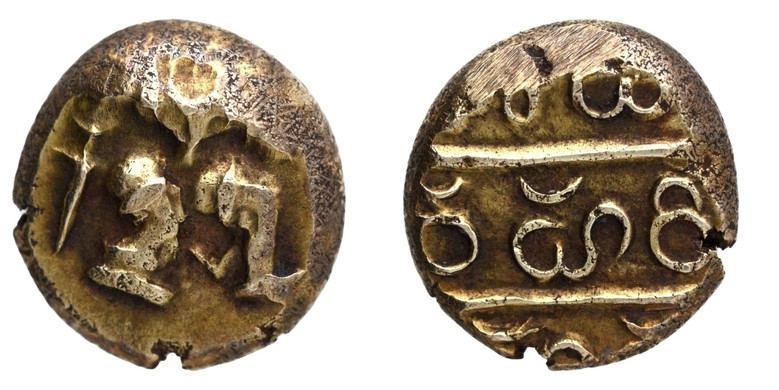
- Pagoda of Harihara I

Vijayanagara Emperor
- Reign: 18 April 1336 – 20 November 1355
- Predecessor: Position established (Veera Ballala III as Hoysala king)
- Successor: Bukka Raya I
- Born: 1306; Deccan Plateau
- Died: 20 November 1355 (aged 48–49); Vijayanagara, Vijayanagara Empire (modern day Hampi, Karnataka, India)
- House: Sangama
- Father: Bhavana Sangama
- Mother: Maravve Nayakiti
- Religion: Hinduism (1306 - 1323; 1334 - 1356); Sunni Islam (1323 - 1334)

Harihara I (1306 – 20 November 1355), also called Hakka and Vira Harihara I, was the founder of the Vijayanagara Empire, in present-day Karnataka, India, which he ruled from 18 April 1336 until his death on 20 November 1355. He and his successors formed the Sangama dynasty, the first of four dynasties to rule the empire. He was the eldest son of Bhavana Sangama, the chieftain of a cowherd pastoralist community, who claimed Yadava descent.

== Early life ==
The early life of Hakka and his brother Bukka is relatively unknown and most accounts are based on speculative theories. According to the theories, Bukka and Hakka were commanders in the army of the Kakatiya King of Warangal. After the King of Warangal was defeated by Muhammad bin Tughlaq, Bukka and his brother were taken prisoners and sent to Delhi, where they both converted to Islam. Bukka and his brother eventually escaped, reverted to Hinduism under the influence of the sage Vidyaranya, and founded the Vijayanagara Empire.

== Reign ==
Ballappa Dandanayaka, a nephew of the Hoysala king Veera Ballala III, had married a daughter of Harihara. This shows that Harihara was associated with the Hoysala Court. Immediately after coming to power, he built a fort at Barkuru, on the west coast of present-day Karnataka. It appears from inscriptions that he was administering the northern parts of present-day Karnataka from his seat at Gooty (Gutti), Ananthpur district in 1339. He initially controlled the northern portions of the Hoysala Kingdom before taking full control over its entire range after the death of Hoysala Veera Ballala III in 1343. Kannada inscriptions of his time call him Karnataka Vidya Vilas ("master of great knowledge and skills"), Bhashege tappuva rayara ganda ("punisher of those feudatories who don't keep their promise"), and Arirayavibhada ("fire to enemy kings"). Among his brothers, Kampana governed the Nellur region, Muddppa administered the Mulabagalu region, Marappa oversaw Chandragutti and Bukka Raya was his second in command.

His initial military exploits established his control over the valley of Tungabhadra River, and gradually he expanded his control to certain regions of Konkan and Malabar Coast. By that time, the Hoysala ruler Veera Ballala III had died fighting the Sultan of Madurai, and the vacuum thus created allowed Harihara to emerge as a sovereign power with all the Hoysala territories under his rule.

An inscription dated 1346 regarding a grant to the Sringeri matha describes Harihara I as the ruler of "whole country between the eastern and the western seas" and describes Vidya Nagara (that is, the city of learning) as his capital.

Harihara I was succeeded by his brother Bukka I who emerged as the most distinguished amongst the five rulers (Panchasangamas) of the Sangama dynasty.

== Administration ==
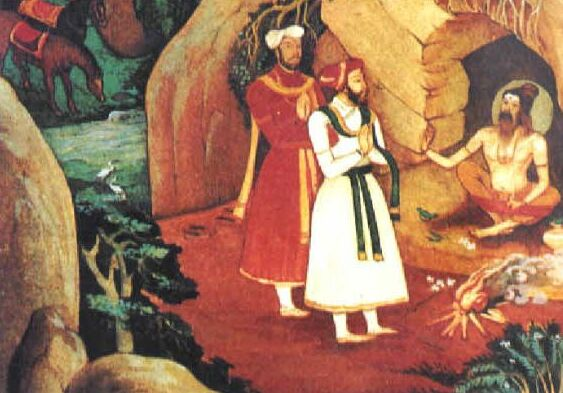
Harihara and his brother Bukka Raya meeting Shankaracharya Vidyaranya.

Harihara was an able administrator. Vijayanagara was the first southern Indian state to have hegemony over three major linguistic and cultural regions and to have established a degree of political unity among them. The administration of the kingdom sporadically achieved some degree of centralization, although centrifugal tendencies regularly appeared. To the original five rajyas (provinces) held by the Sangama brothers, new ones were added as territories were conquered. Within and among these regions, a complex mosaic of rival chiefly houses exercised power to varying degrees, though not with the virtual autonomy that some historians have suggested. The central administration had both a revenue and a military side, but the actual business of raising taxes and troops was mostly the responsibility of the provincial governors and their subordinates. The central government maintained a relatively small body of troops, but it assigned a value to the lands held by the provincial governors and determined the number of troops that were to be supplied from the revenues of each province.

Harihara was fully conscious of the dangers which the parvenu state faced both from both Hindu rival kings and the Delhi sultans. He strengthened the old fort of Badami as a protection against invasions from Delhi rulers. He fortified Gooty in Anantpur District as a safeguard against Hoysala kings.

He also converted Udayagiri into a strong fort and placed his younger brother Kampana in charge of it. With the help of his able minister Anantarasa Chikka Udaiya, he reorganized the civil administration that survived for more than two hundred years. Under the nayankara system, military commanders were appointed 'nayaka' (local governor) and granted income from estates for the purpose of raising troops and maintain control over local chiefs.

In order to increase the resources of the state, he forced the farmers to cut down forests and bring this land under cultivation. The kingdom was divided into sthalas, nadus and simas. A number of officers were appointed to run the administration and collect the revenues.

== Sources ==
- Dr. Suryanath U. Kamat, Concise history of Karnataka, MCC, Bangalore, 2001 (Reprinted 2002)
- Chopra, P.N. T.K. Ravindran and N. Subrahmaniam.History of South India. S. Chand, 2003. ISBN 81-219-0153-7
