= Mallikarjuna Raya =

Emperor of Vijayanagara from 1446 to 1465

Emperor of Vijayanagara
- Reign: May 1446 – 14 July 1465
- Predecessor: Deva Raya II
- Successor: Virupaksha Raya II
- Issue: Virupaksha Raya II
- Dynasty: Sangama
- Father: Deva Raya II
- Religion: Hinduism

Mallikarjuna Raya (reigned May 1446 – 14 July 1465), also known as Deva Raya III, was an Emperor of Vijayanagara from the Sangama Dynasty.

Mallikarjuna Raya succeeded his father Emperor Deva Raya II, who had brought prosperity throughout the Vijayanagara Empire as well as a golden age for the Sangama Dynasty. However, unlike his father, Mallikarjuna was a weak and corrupt ruler.

At the beginning of his reign, he successfully defended the empire against invasions by the Turko-Persian Bahmani Sultanate and the Gajapati Empire, which then stretched from the Ganges to the Kaveri, but thereafter his reign was marked by a string of defeats. The Gajapatis conquered Rajamahendri in 1454 and Udayagiri and Chandragiri in 1463. The Bahmani Sultanate took over much of the Vijayanagara Empire by 1450 and grew closer to the capital of Vijayanagara.

These events eventually led to the decline of the Sangama Dynasty; Mallikarjuna Raya's nephew Virupaksha Raya II took the opportunity to seize the throne, though he failed to prove a better ruler. It is unknown what happened to Mallikarjuna after that.

Preceded by Deva Raya II	Vijayanagar Empire; 1446–1465	Succeeded by Virupaksha Raya II
