= Ramachandra Raya =

Emperor of Vijayanagara in 1423

Emperor of Vijayanagara
- Reign: 4 April 1423–1423
- Predecessor: Deva Raya I
- Successor: Veera Vijaya Bukka Raya
- Born: 1367; Vijayanagara, Vijayanagara Empire (modern day Hampi, Karnataka, India)
- Died: 1423; Vijayanagara, Vijayanagara Empire (modern day Hampi, Karnataka, India)
- House: Sangama
- Father: Deva Raya I
- Religion: Hinduism

Ramachandra Raya (1367–1423) was an emperor of the Vijayanagara Empire from the Sangama Dynasty.

Ramachandra Raya succeeded Deva Raya I and briefly reigned as emperor after the latter's death on 25 February 1423. Throughout his reign, there were no recorded significant changes in territory or major events. He was succeeded by his brother, Viravijaya raya, in the same year who like his brother Ramachandra is not noted for doing anything significant.

Preceded by Deva Raya I	Vijayanagara Empire	Succeeded by Vijararaya
