= Virupaksha Raya II =

Emperor of Vijayanagara from 1465 to 1485

Emperor of Vijayanagara
- Reign: October 1465 – 1485
- Predecessor: Mallikarjuna Raya
- Successor: Praudha Raya
- Died: 1485
- Issue: Praudha Raya
- Dynasty: Sangama
- Religion: Hinduism

Virupaksha Raya II (died 1485) was the Emperor of Vijayanagara from October 1465 until his death in 1485. from the Sangama dynasty.

== Reign ==
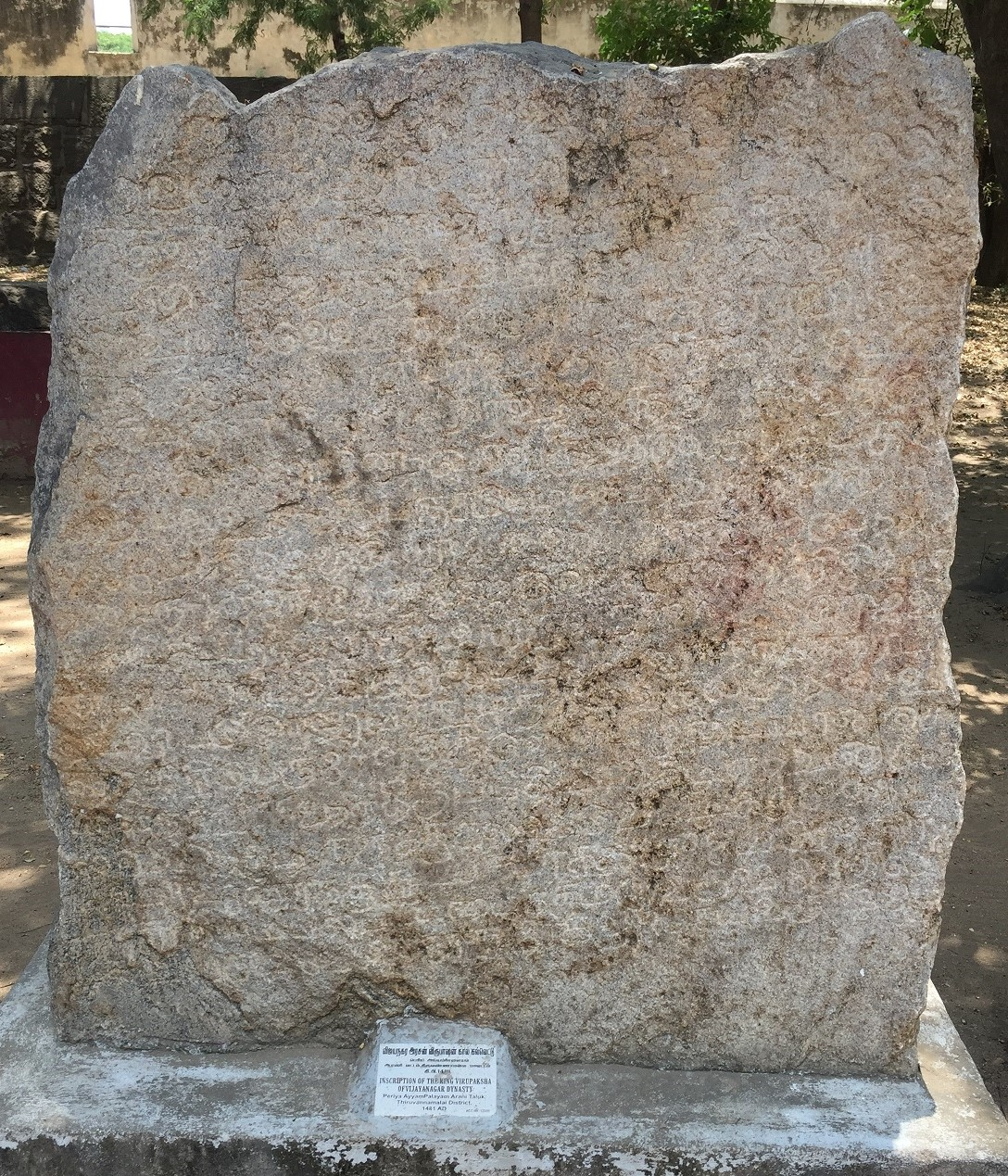
Vijaynagar Virupaksha Tamil Inscription, 1481 AD, Thiruvanamalai District, displayed at the ASI Museum, Vellore Fort

In 1465, Virupaksha Raya II succeeded his uncle, Mallikarjuna Raya, a corrupt and weak ruler who continually lost against the empire's enemies. Even so, Virupaksha Raya II was no better a ruler than his predecessor. Throughout his reign, Virupaksha was faced with rebellious nobles and officers as well as multiple enemies who began to invade the weakened empire. It was during this time that Virupaksha Raya II lost the Konkan coast (including Goa, Chaul, and Dabul) by 1470 to Prime Minister Mahamud Gawan of Turko-Persian Bahmani Sultanate, who was sent to conquer the area by the Sultan Muhammad Shah III. The Bahmani Sultan would also invade the Doab of Krishna and Tungabhadra, and the Raja Purushottama Gajapati of Odisha invaded Tiruvannamalai. Because of these losses, Virupaksha became increasingly unpopular and ignited many of the empire's provinces to rebel, eventually leading up to Virupaksha's death at the hands of his own son, Praudha Raya in 1485. Praudha Raya himself was not able to salvage the empire but an able general Saluva Narasimha I took control of the empire in 1485 and helped prevent its demise, though this change of power marked the end of the Sangama Dynasty and the beginning of the Saluva Dynasty.
