= Deva Raya II =

Emperor of Vijayanagara from 1423 to 1446

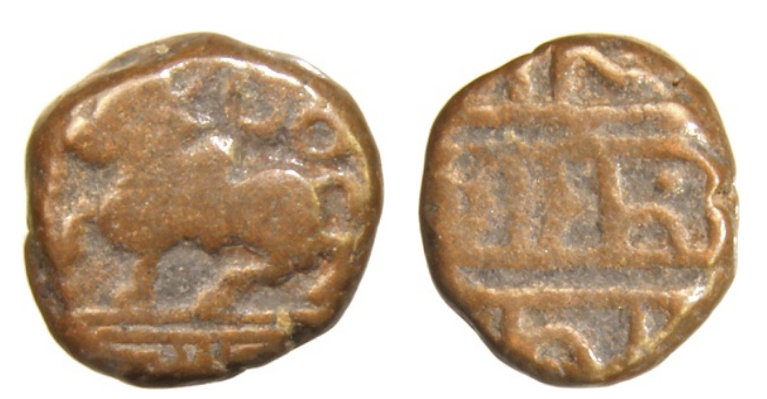
- bronze Pagoda of Deva Raya II

Emperor of Vijayanagara
- Reign: 10 February 1423 – 24 May 1446
- Predecessor: Bukka Raya III
- Successor: Deva Raya III
- Born: Vijayanagara, Vijayanagara Empire (modern day Hampi, Karnataka, India)
- Died: 24 May 1446; Vijayanagara, Vijayanagara Empire (modern-day Hampi, Karnataka, India)
- Issue: Deva Raya III
- House: Sangama
- Father: Bukka Raya III
- Mother: unknown
- Religion: Hinduism

Deva Raya II (reigned 10 February 1423 – 24 May 1446) was an emperor of the Vijayanagara Empire. He is considered by many as the greatest of the Sangama dynasty rulers, he was an able administrator, warrior, and scholar. He authored well-known works in Kannada (Sobagina Sone and Amaruka) and Sanskrit (Mahanataka Sudhanidhi). He was patron to some of the most noted Kannada poets of the medieval period, including Chamarasa and Kumara Vyasa, the Sanskrit poet Gunda Dimdima, and the noted Telugu language poet Srinatha, whom the king honored with the title Kavisarvabhauma ("Emperor of poets"). He supported development in secular literature as well as the noted South Indian mathematician Parameshvara, from the Kerala school of astronomy and mathematics in his empire.

According to the historian Sastri, Deva Raya II had the title Gajabeteegara, which literally means "Hunter of elephants", an honorific that explained his addiction to hunting elephants or a metaphor referring to his victories against enemies who were "as strong as elephants". Despite some reversals, Deva Raya II extended and held territories up to the Krishna river. According to an account of the visiting Persian chronicler Abdur Razzak, Deva Raya II's empire extended from Ceylon to Gulbarga, and Orissa to the Malabar. According to the historians Chopra, Ravindran and Subrahmaniyan, the king maintained a fleet of ships which helped him in his overseas connections. From the account of the contemporary European explorer Nicolo Conti, the king levied tribute on Ceylon, Quilon, Pegu, Pulicat and Tenasserim.

== The empire ==
=== Wars with the Gajapati Kingdom ===
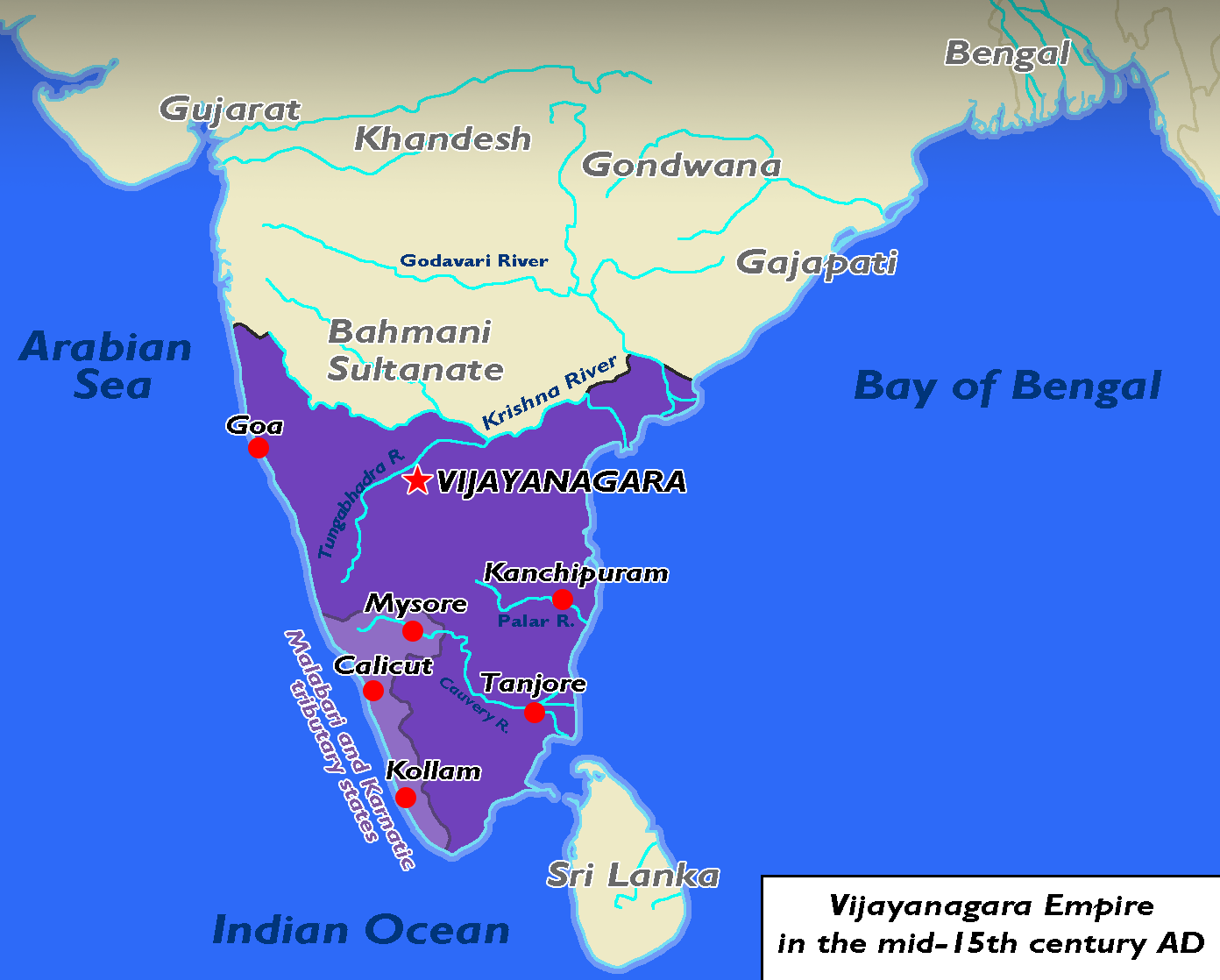
Extent of Vijayanagara empire at the end of Deva Raya II's reign

Deva Raya II's rule is the golden age in the history of South India and in particular, that of Karnataka. He succeeded his father Veera Vijaya Bukka Raya after his short uneventful two-year reign. Even as a crown prince in c. 1423, he had tasted success in battle against the Bahamani Sultanate, forcing them to switch capitals to Bidar in c. 1426. Deva Raya II fought three important battles against the Gajapati of Odisha: in c. 1427 against King Bhanudeva IV in the Battle of Kondavidu, in c. 1436 against King Kapilendra when the latter tried to conquer Rajamahendri, and again in c. 1441. An invasion by the Reddis of Kondavidu was also repulsed and by c. 1432, all the petty chiefs of the region were brought under the Vijayanagara control.

=== Sultanate affairs ===
After a short period of peace, Vijayanagara was pulled into war with their traditional foes, the Bahamani Sultanate. These wars however brought mixed results. In c. 1436, Ala-ud-din II ascended the Bahamani throne and promptly sent his brother Muhammad to collect tribute. According to the Sastri, Deva Raya II had to pay a large tribute to buy peace. During this time, the Vijayanagara armies were consistently defeated by the Bahamani armies and Deva Raya II was hard pressed to find a solution, which eventually led to the inclusion of many skilled Muslim soldiers in the Vijayanagara army. In c. 1436, in a military altercation, some accounts suggest Deva Raya II lost the fort at Mudgal but according to the historian Kamath, a c. 1436 inscription at Mudgal shows the fort remained under Vijayanagara control. During an uncertain period that followed in c. 1443, when the king appears to have been a victim of an attempted assassination, some regions in the Tungabhadra River-Krishna River doab were lost to the Bahamani Sultanate.

There are conflicting accounts provided by contemporary Persian writers Ferishtah and Abdur Razzak regarding the events that led to the war. According to Ferishtah, Deva Raya II had bought peace earlier by paying a handsome tribute to the Bahamanis. He however refused to honor the agreement and this led to war. According to this account, with an intent of strengthening his army, Deva Raya II employed many expert Muslim archers and cavalry and this incited the war. But according to Razzak's account written in Calicut in c. 1443, the Sultans attempt to seize more Vijayanagara territory by taking advantage of the prevailing confusion (caused by the assassination attempt that he appeared to be aware of) was the cause of the war. According to Razzak who was eyewitness to the episode, a brother of Deva Raya II invited the king and many important nobility to a feast and had most of the invitees beheaded. But finding that the king had not attended the dinner, he went to the royal palace and stabbed and wounded an unaided Deva Raya II. Seizing the opportunity, the Bahamani Sultan demanded seven lakh Varaha (700,000) Pagodas as tribute. Deva Raya II refused to pay and this led to war. According to Chopra et al., and Sastri the first battles was a success for Vijayanagara armies who captured Raichur, Bankapura and marched up to Bijapur. But in the last three battles, Deva Raya II's son may have been killed in battle, and the Vijayanagara armies were pushed back to their original stronghold at Mudgal. Two Sultanate generals were taken prisoner but later released to end hostilities.

=== Success in the south and Ceylon ===
Deva Raya II's empire included Kerala where he defeated the ruler of Quilon as well as other chieftains in the region. His able commander Lakkanna invaded Ceylon and collected rich tributes there. The Zamorin of Calicut and even the kings of Burma ruling at Pegu and Tanasserim paid tribute. This information was obtained from the writings of Nuniz. Though the Zamorin maintained his independence, from Razzak's account, he feared and respected Deva Raya II.

=== Accounts of foreign visitors ===
It was during this time that the explorer Nicolo Conti and Persian chronicler Abdur Razzak arrived in South India. Conti wrote :"the king of Vijayanagar is more powerful than all the other kings in India." Razzak wrote :"the ear of intelligence had never been informed that there existed anything equal to Vijayanagara in the world and the pupil of eye has never seen a place like it" (on an interesting side note the two explorers also commented on Deva Raya II's large harem in which 4000 queens followed him everywhere he went). Razzaq who was also an ambassador at the court of Deva Raya II wrote:"This prince has in his dominions three hundred ports, each of which is equal to Calicut and his territories compromise a space of three months journey. Both travelers concur that the country was thickly populated with numerous towns and villages. Razzaq wrote:"The country is for the most part well cultivated and very fertile. The troops amount in number to eleven Lakhs (1,100,000)." Razzaq considered Vijayanagara to be one of the most splendid of the cities in the world he had seen. Describing the city, he wrote: "It is built in such a manner that seven citadels and the same number of walls enclose each other. The seventh fortress, which is placed in the center of the others, occupy an area ten times larger than the market place of the city of Herat". With regards to the market places he wrote:"the jewelers sell publicly in the bazaar pearls, rubies, emeralds and diamonds in this agreeable locality and in the king's palace one sees numerous running streams and canals formed of chiseled stone, polished and smooth..."

== Culture and the arts ==
Deva Raya II's rule was a high point in the development of Kannada literature, when competition between Vaishnava and Veerashaiva writers was fierce and literary disputations between the two sects were common. Some of most noted Kannada writers of the 15th century, Chamarasa and Kumara Vyasa; Chandrashekara (Chrakavi) who wrote on secular topics; and the king's zealous Veerashaiva ministers and writers, Lakkana Dandesa and Jakkanarya (who himself patronized the Kannada poets Kumarabankanatha and Mahalingadeva) were in his court. The king himself was no less a writer, the romantic stories Sobagina Sone (lit "The Drizzle of Beauty") and Amaruka are assigned to him.

In the Telugu realm, this was the age of Srinatha. With an unrivaled command on Telugu and Sanskrit languages, he is known to have defeated in a debate, the reputed Sanskrit scholar Dindima. Srinatha was honored with the title Kavisarvabhauma. The king showed his appreciation with a kanakabhisheka ceremony (the "showering of gold coins on the head"). Srinatha is known to have lived a life of pleasure and moved on equal terms with the ministers in the king's court, though he died a poor man.

== Bibliography ==
- Chopra, P.N.; Ravindran, T.K.; Subrahmanian, N (2003) [2003]. History of South India (Ancient, Medieval and Modern) Part 2. New Delhi: Chand Publications. ISBN 81-219-0153-7.
- Kamath, Suryanath U. (2001) [1980]. A concise history of Karnataka: from pre-historic times to the present. Bangalore: Jupiter books. LCCN 80905179. OCLC 7796041.
- Sastri, K.A. Nilakanta (2002) [1955]. A history of South India from prehistoric times to the fall of Vijayanagar. New Delhi: Indian Branch, Oxford University Press. ISBN 0-19-560686-8.
- Sinopoli, Carla M. (2003) [2003]. The Political Economy of Craft Production: Crafting Empire in South India c. 1350-1650. New Delhi: Cambridge University Press. ISBN 0-521-82613-6.
- Farooqui, Salma Ahmed (2011) [2011]. A Comprehensive History of Medieval India: From Twelfth to the Mid-Eighteenth Century. New Delhi: Pearson Education. ISBN 978-81-317-3202-1.
- Chandra, Satish (1997) [1997]. Medieval India: From Sultanat to the Mughals-Delhi Sultanat (1206-1526). New Delhi: Har-Anand. ISBN 8124110646.
- Rice, E.P. (1982) [1921]. A History of Kanarese Literature. New Delhi: Asian Educational Services. ISBN 81-206-0063-0.

Preceded by Vira Vijaya Bukka Raya	Vijayanagar empire 1424–1446	Succeeded by Mallikarjuna Raya
