= Bhavana Sangama =

Father of the founders of the Vijayanagara Empire

- Spouse: Maravve Nayakitio
- Issue: Harihara I, Bukka Raya I Kampa I, Marappa and Muddappa
- Dynasty: Sangama

Bhavana Sangama or simply Sangama was the father of the brothers Harihara I and Bukka Raya I, the founders of the Vijayanagara Empire in present-day Karnataka, India.

== Biography ==
According to Ramchandra Chintaman Dhere, Sangama was a chieftain of a pastoralist community of the shepherd caste. He was married to Maravve Nayakiti, the daughter of the Kampili king Kampili Deva Raya and the elder sister of prince Kumara Rama. He had 5 children, Harihara, Bukka, Kampa I, Marappa and Muddappa, who founded the Vijayanagara Empire (mainly by Harihara and Bukka)

== Bibliography ==
- Dr. Suryanath U. Kamat, Concise history of Karnataka, MCC, Bangalore, 2001 (Reprinted 2002)
- Chopra, P.N. T.K. Ravindran and N. Subrahmaniam.History of South India. S. Chand, 2003. ISBN 81-219-0153-7
