= Deva Raya I =

Emperor of Vijayanagara from 1406 to 1423

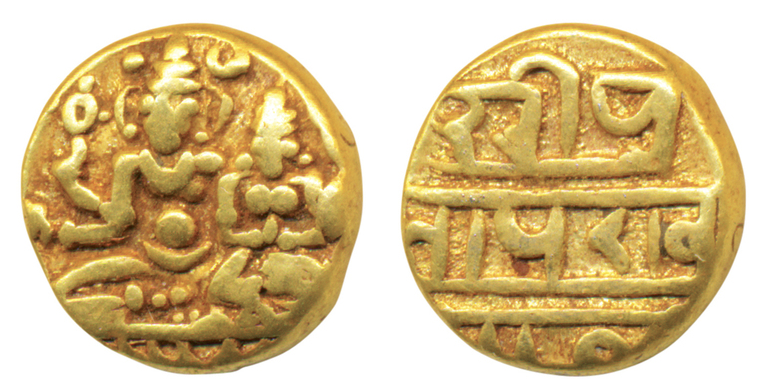
- Gold Pagoda of Deva Raya I

Emperor of Vijayanagara
- Reign: 5 November 1406 – 25 February 1423
- Predecessor: Bukka Raya II
- Successor: Ramachandra Raya
- Born: c. 1370; Vijayanagara, Vijayanagara Empire (modern day Hampi, Karnataka, India)
- Died: 25 February 1423 (aged 52–53); Vijayanagara, Vijayanagara Empire (modern day Hampi, Karnataka, India)
- Issue: Ramachandra Raya; Bukka Raya III
- House: Sangama
- Dynasty: Vijayanagara
- Father: Harihara II
- Mother: Bhima Devi
- Religion: Hinduism

Deva Raya I (c. 1370 – 25 February 1423) was an Yadava Emperor of the Vijayanagara Empire (of the Sangama Dynasty). After Harihara II died, there was a dispute among his sons over succession, in which Deva Raya I eventually emerged victor. He was a very capable ruler noted for his military exploits and his support to irrigation works in his empire. He modernized the Vijayanagara army by improving the cavalry, employed skilled archers of the Turkic clans and raised the fighting capacity of his bowmen and imported horses from Arabia and Persia.

The Italian traveler Niccolo Conti, who visited Vijayanagara c. 1420, described Deva Raya I thus: "In this city, there are 90,000 men fit to bear arms... their king is more powerful than all the kings of India". Conti also noted that the royal city had grown to a circumference of 60 mi.

Deva Raya I was a patron of Kannada literature and architecture. Madhura, a noted Jain poet was in his court and wrote in Kannada the Dharmanathapurana on the life of the fifteenth Jain Tirthankara (Dharmanatha), and a poem in eulogy of Gommateshvara of Shravanabelagola.

== Irrigation works and general administration ==
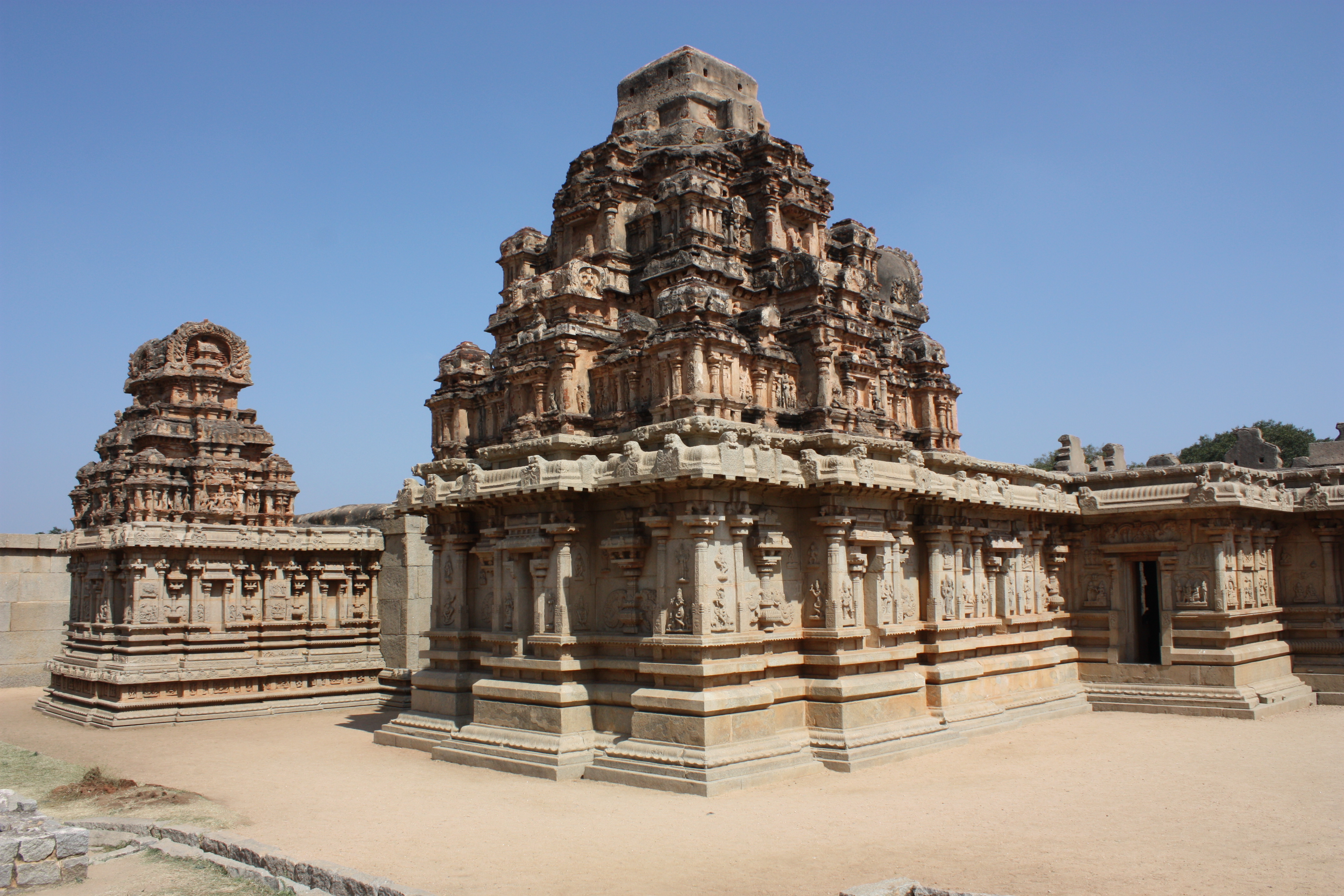
The Hazara Rama temple built by Deva Raya I in Hampi

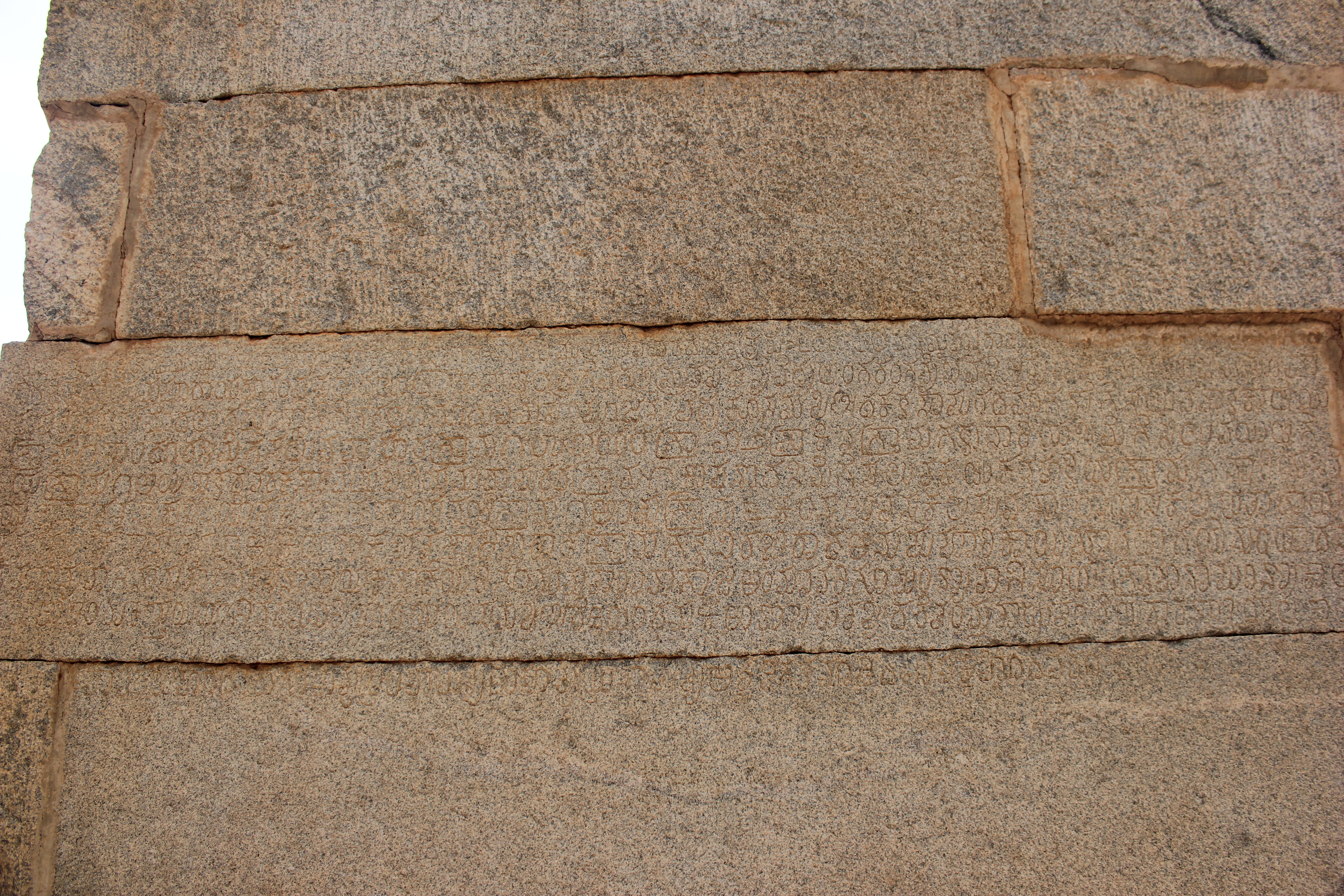
Kannada inscription of Deva Raya I at the Hazara Rama temple in Hampi

The credit for making the capital city of the Vijayanagara Empire one of the biggest cities in the 15th century goes to Deva Raya I. He realized that the scarcity of water, both for drinking and irrigation, was restricting the growth of the royal capital. In c. 1410 he had a barrage constructed across the Tungabhadra River and commissioned a 24 km long aqueduct from the Tungabhadra River to the capital. The account provided by Nuniz gives details of the projects undertaken by Deva Raya I that brought prosperity to the empire. He maintained a secular attitude in administrative matters. He had a mosque and a slaughter house constructed for the convenience of the Muslim soldiers in his army. In c. 1413, a dispute over property between the Shanka Jainalya of Lakshmeshwara and the Someshvara temple trust of the palace was settled in favor of the Jains. Deva Raya I had a Muslim bodyguard who built a choultry in honor of the Emperor.

== Military campaigns ==
Throughout his reign, Deva Raya was continually at war with the Velamas of Golconda, the Bahmani Sultan of Gulbarga, the Reddis of Kondavidu, and the traditional rivals of Vijayanagara, the Gajapatis of Kalinga. Deva Raya I was capable of managing the vast territory that he controlled by employing skilled archers of the Turkic clan and raised the fighting capacity of his bowmen. Following a confusion in the Reddi kingdom, Deva Raya I entered into an alliance with Warangal for partitioning the Reddi kingdom between them. The split of Warangal changed the balance of power in the Deccan. In c.1420, Firoz Shah invaded Pangal but the two-year siege at Pangal ended in disease and disaster for Firoz Shah's armies. Deva Raya inflicted a shattering defeat on Firoz Shah. Deva Raya's army massacred Firoz Shah's troops and created a great platform with their heads upon the field of battle. Firoz was followed deep into his own territory, which was completely devastated by the rampaging Hindu army under Deva Raya I. The Hindu army destroyed many mosques and holy places belonging to the Islamic community, and committed great carnages on the civilian Muslim population. The Sultan had to hand over the southern and eastern districts of his kingdom to Deva Raya I to secure peace. Consequently, by c.1422, Deva Raya I came to control territory up to the Krishna River - Tungabhadra River doab including Pangal In the following days, the distressed Sultan died after leading a life of piety after abdicating power to his brother Ahmad. Unable to accept this turnaround, the Gajapati Emperor Bhanudeva of Odisha invaded Rajamahendri. When a war with Vijayanagara seemed imminent, some skilful diplomacy by Vijayanagara chief Dodda Alla averted it. Deva Raya was to be succeeded by his sons Ramachandra Raya and shortly thereafter by Vijaya Raya.

== Ferishta's account ==
Persian writer Ferishta narrates an interesting story, of the kings' love for a beautiful girl, a daughter of a goldsmith from Mudugal in the Raichur district. Unable to wed her, a frustrated Deva Raya I attacked Mudgal and laid to waste a few villages. Aroused by this provocation, the Bahmani Sultan Taj ud-Din Firuz Shah invaded Vijayanagara leading to defeat of Deva Raya I. Though injured in the conflict, Firuz Shah sent his able commanders who successfully invaded Vijayanagara territory south of Adoni.

According to this account, Deva Raya I had to give as tribute, one of his daughters in marriage to the Sultan's prince, several pearls and cash, Bankapura territory, fifty elephants, and 2,000 dancers. The goldsmith's daughter who was the reason for the war was wedded to Hassan Khan, a prince in the Sultan's family.

== Personal life ==
One of Deva Raya's queens Bhima Devi was a disciple of the Jain guru Abhinava Charukirti Panditacharya. She was a devotee of Shantinatha, 16th Jain tirthankara and built a temple at the Mangayi Basti in Shravanabelagola.

== Gallery ==
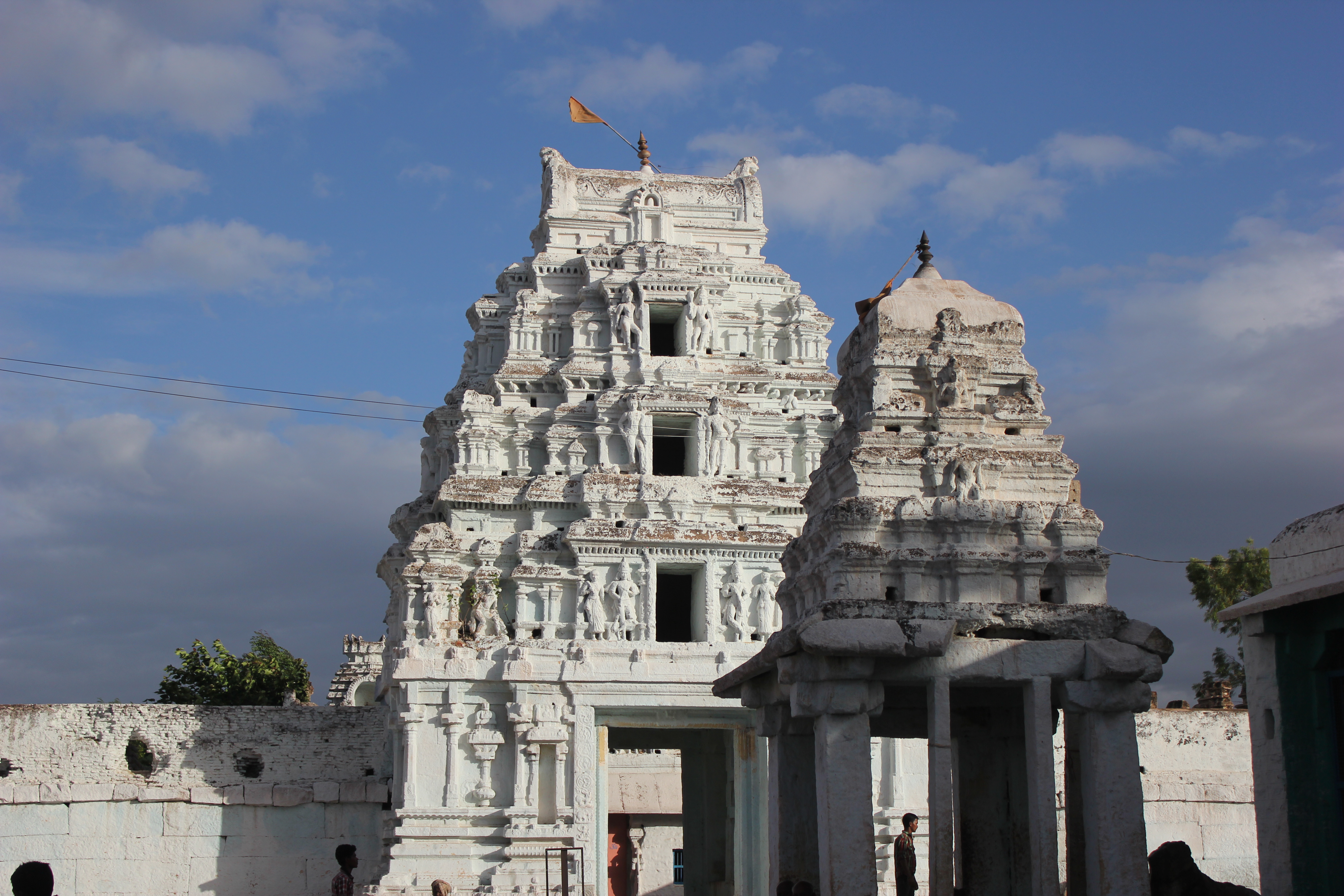
Mallikarjuna temple in Mallapangudi, near Hospet, built by Deva Raya I

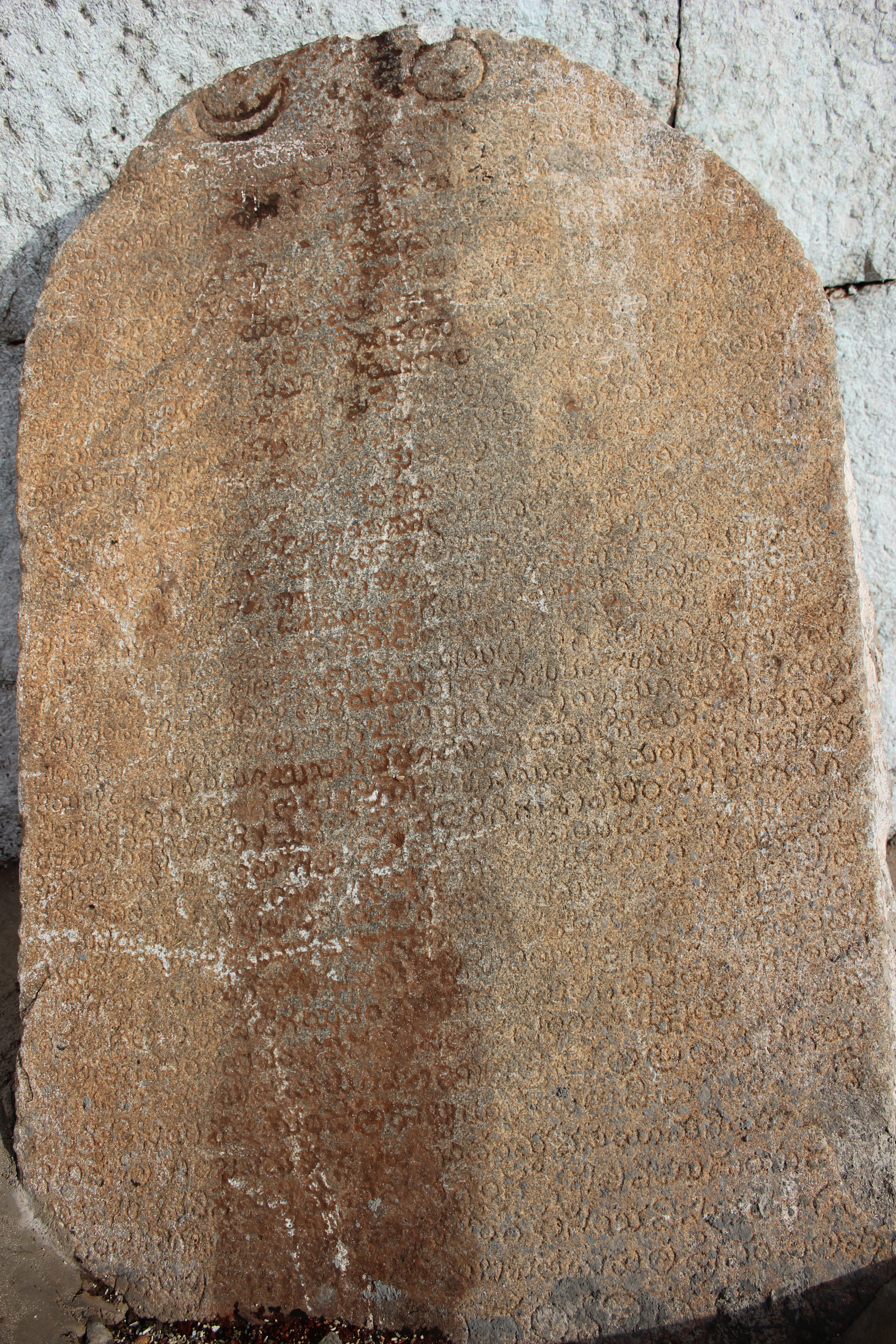
Kannada inscription of Deva Raya I at the Mallikarjuna temple in Mallappanagudi

== Notes ==
Preceded by Bukka Raya II	Vijayanagar empire 1406–1422	Succeeded by Vira Vijaya Bukka Raya
