= Sangama dynasty =

First dynasty of Vijayanagara (1336–1485)

The Sangama dynasty was a dynasty of the Vijayanagara Empire founded in the 14th century by two brothers: Harihara I (also called Vira Harihara or Hakka Raya) and Bukka Raya I. They were the sons of Bhavana Sangama.

== Foundation and early history ==
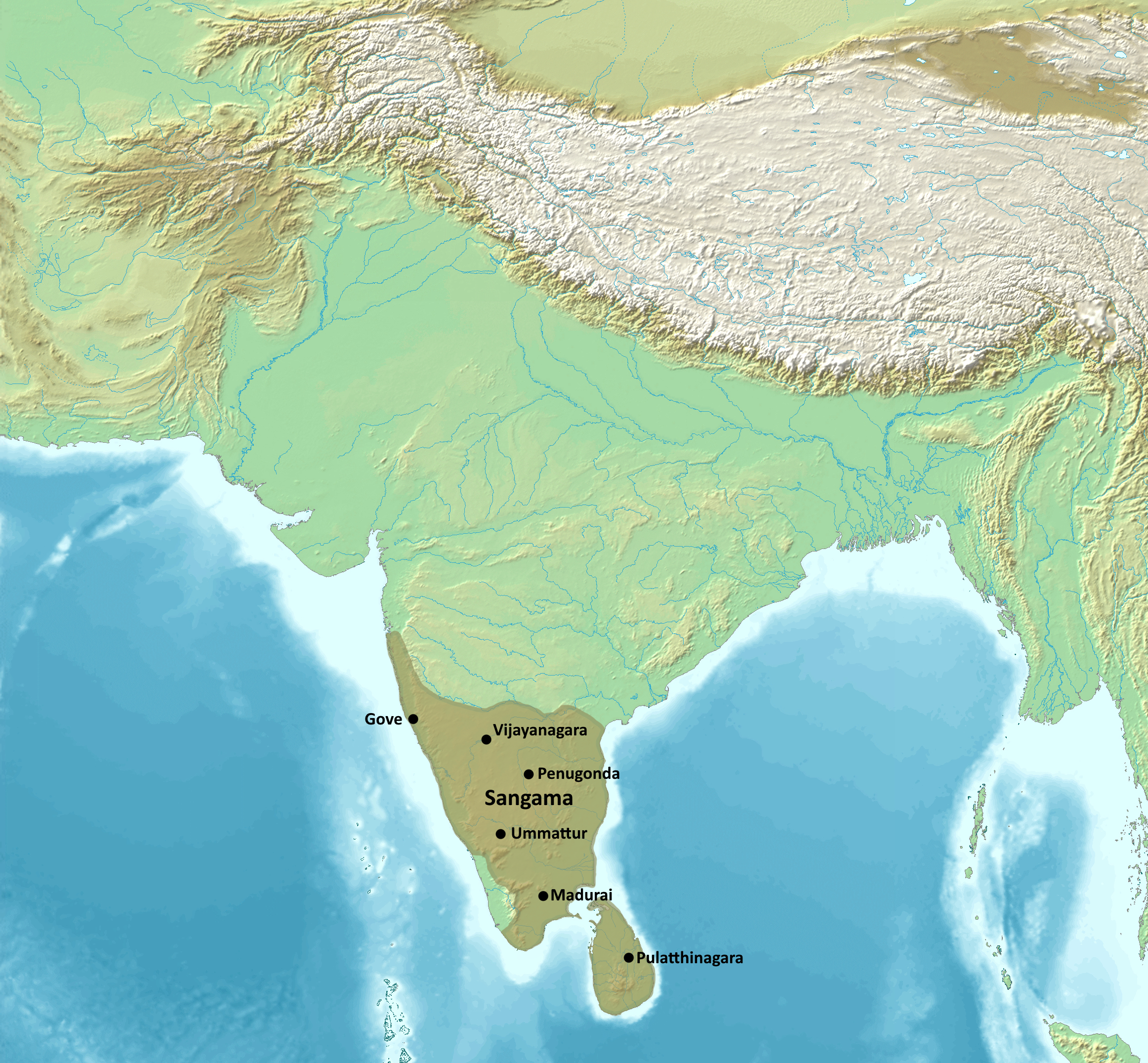
Map of the Sangama dynasty of the Vijayanagara Empire

The Sangama dynasty was founded by Harihara I and Bukka. Their father had been taken prisoner in 1327 by Muhammad bin Tughluq. They founded Vijayanagara in 1336.

== Successors ==
Bukka's successor, Harihara II, continued Bukka's campaign throughout southern India and managed to take control of coastal Andhra between Nellore and Kalinga and conquer the Addanki and Srisailam areas as well as most of the territories between the peninsula to the south of the Krishna River. Harihara II also managed to conquer many Indian ports such as that of Goa, Chaul, and Dabhol.

After Harihara II died the throne was in conflict between Virupaksha Raya, Bukka Raya II, and Deva Raya of which Deva Raya would eventually come out as the victor. During his reign, Deva Raya managed to successfully control the vast number of territories in the empire. The kings after Deva Raya on the other hand did not manage to do anything significant at all for the kingdom. This was until Deva Raya II, who would bring about the golden age of the Sangama Dynasty. Under Deva Raya II's rule, the empire would succeed in completely conquering southern India such as conquering Kondavidu, defeating the ruler of Quilon as well as other chieftains, extending the empire from Odisha to Malabar and from Ceylon to Gulbarga, and also taking over a lot of the major Indian ports. However after Deva Raya II, his incompetent successors would eventually cause the destruction of the dynasty with the Bahamani Kingdoms continually taking over much of the Vijayanaga territory. Virupaksha Raya II was the last emperor of the dynasty.

== List of rulers ==
- Harihara I (1336–1356 CE), founder of empire and dynasty
- Bukka Raya I (1356–1377 CE), also founder of empire
- Harihara II (1377–1404 CE)
- Virupaksha Raya (1404–1405 CE)
- Bukka Raya II (1405–1406 CE)
- Deva Raya (1406–1422 CE)
- Ramachandra Raya (1422 CE)
- Vira Vijaya Bukka Raya (1422–1424)
- Deva Raya II (1424–1446 CE)
- Mallikarjuna Raya (1446–1465 CE)
- Virupaksha Raya II (1465–1485 CE)
- Praudha Raya (1485 CE), last ruler

== See also ==
- Vijaynagara Empire
