= Siege of Kalyani (1562) =

- Part of Deccani–Vijayanagar wars
Date	1562
Location	Basavakalyan, Karnataka, India 17.8728°N 76.9497°E
Result	Vijaynagara-Allied victory

Belligerents
Vijayanagar Empire Deccan Sultanates: Bijapur Sultanate; Bidar Sultanate; Berar Sultanate	Deccan Sultanates: Ahmednagar Sultanate; Golconda Sultanate

Strength
Rama Raya; Venkatadri; Ali Adil Shah I Ali Barid Shah I Burhan Imad Shah	Hussain Nizam Shah I Ibrahim Quli Qutub Shah Wali

Casualties and losses
Unknown	700 artillery guns
- Location within South Asia

The Siege of Kalyani (1562) was a military conflict between the Ahmednagar Sultanate under Hussain Nizam Shah I and the Golconda Sultanate under Ibrahim Qutb Shah against the allied forces of the Vijayanagara Empire, Bijapur Sultanate, Bidar Sultanate and Berar Sultanate. Following the marriage alliance between Ahmednagar and Golconda, their armies besieged Kalyani Fort. Rama Raya intervened in support of Ali Adil Shah I and marched against the besieging forces alongside Ali Barid Shah I of Bidar and Burhan Imad Shah of Berar. The allied army defeated the armies of Ahmednagar and Golconda, forcing both sultans to retreat towards Ahmednagar.

== Background ==
Following the surrender in 1558, Hussain Nizam Shah I returned to Ahmednagar. He subsequently demolished the old mud fort of Ahmednagar and replaced it with a larger and stronger stone fortification. Concerned by the loss of Kalyani, Hussain Nizam Shah I decided on the advice of his ministers Mir Qasim Beg and Maulana Inayat, who had returned to his service to form an alliance with Ibrahim Qutb Shah Wali of Golconda. Ibrahim had provided considerable assistance during his recent war against Vijayanagara Empire and Bijapur Sultanate. The two sultans met near Kalyani, where Hussain Nizam Shah I's daughter Bibi Jamil was married to Ibrahim Qutb Shah Wali.

== Siege ==
The two sultans subsequently laid siege to Kalyani Fort. Rama Raya could not ignore Ibrahim Qutb Shah's hostile actions, which threatened to disrupt the balance of power in the Deccan. Ali Adil Shah I's repeated requests for military assistance provided Rama Raya with an opportunity to counter Ibrahim Qutb Shah Wali. When Ali Adil Shah I arrived at Vijayanagara to seek his support, Rama Raya received him warmly and promised to lead his army against the sultans of Ahmadnagar and Golconda.

Rama Raya ordered his brother Venkatadri to march against the southern districts of the Golconda Sultanate with a large army, accompanied by Jagadeva Rao and ʿAin-ul-Mulk. He then set out with another army, accompanied by Ali Adil Shah I, Ali Barid Shah I of Bidar, and Burhan Imad Shah of Berar to relieve Kalyani, which was under siege by the forces of Hussain Nizam Shah I and Ibrahim Qutb Shah.

Hussain Nizam Shah I accompanied by Ibrahim Qutb Shah advanced with 700 guns and 500 elephants to confront the allied forces. However, a violent storm destroyed his tents, while heavy rainfall turned the black clay ground of his encampment into mud, rendering his artillery and cattle almost useless. Ibrahim Qutub Shah retreated under attacks from the forces of Bijapur, Bidar and Berar, while Hussain Nizam Shah I faced the Vijayanagara army and lost his artillery train of 700 guns. On the third day, Hussain was forced to abandon the remaining 40 guns and flee towards Ahmednagar. Accompanied by only 1,000 cavalrymen, he fought his way through 6,000 enemy troops while retaining his royal umbrella. Both Hussain Nizam Shah I and Ibrahim Qutub Shah retreated towards Ahmednagar leaving their camps to be plundered by the allied forces.

== Aftermath ==
After plundering the Ahmednagar camp, the allied army pursued Hussain Nizam Shah I. However deeming further pursuit unnecessary, the allies eventually abandoned the chase. Hussain sent supplies into the fort of Ahmednagar before retreating to Junnar.

== See also ==
- Battle of Talikota
- Murtaza Nizam Shah I
- Mughal Empire
