= Siege of Penukonda (1567) =

- Part of Deccani–Vijayanagar wars
Date	1567
Location	Penukonda, Andhra Pradesh, India 14.0850°N 77.5960°E
Result	Vijaynagara victory

Belligerents
Vijayanagara Empire	Bijapur Sultanate

Commanders and leaders
Tirumala Deva Raya; Savaram Chennappa Nayaka	Ali Adil Shah I Khizr Khan
- Location within South Asia

The Siege of Penukonda (1567) was a conflict between the Vijayanagara Empire under Tirumala Deva Raya and the Bijapur Sultanate under Ali Adil Shah I. After the Battle of Talikota Peda Tirumala, the son of Rama Raya sought the support of Ali Adil Shah I in his claim to power against his uncle Tirumala Deva Raya. Seeing an opportunity to expand his influence in the weakened Vijayanagara Empire, Ali Adil Shah I sent an army under Khizr Khan to besiege Penukonda. The fort was defended by Savaram Chennappa Nayaka, he defeated the Bijapur army and forced them to retreat. Tirumala also sought help from Ahmadnagar the Ahmednagar army under Khunza Humayun Begum invaded the Bijapur domains forcing Ali Adil Shah I to withdraw from Penukonda.

== Background ==
After the death of Rama Raya at the Battle of Talikota in 1565, his younger brother Tirumala Deva Raya fled Vijayanagara with the imperial treasury, which was transported on one thousand five hundred fifty elephants. He abandoned the city and its inhabitants to their fate, taking with him only the captive emperor Sadasiva Raya and the women of the royal family.

Tirumala Deva Raya set up his government at Penukonda and began raising an army. In his desperate situation, he is said to have taken several horses from Portuguese merchants without paying for them. He gave up Vijayanagara partly because many people in the city supported the claim of Rama Raya's son, Peda Tirumala also known as Timma, to the regency. Tirumala became king only after six years of disorder. The administration had already been weakened by Rama Raya's practice of replacing experienced officials with his relatives. Rebellions broke out in different parts of the empire, crime increased, and Polygars and Dacoits became more powerful. During these years the Nayaks of Madurai, Thanjavur and Gingee also became effectively independent.

== Siege ==
While Tirumala Deva Raya was still rebuilding his strength, he had to defend the kingdom against a Bijapur invasion. Peda Tirumala, the son of Rama Raya had earlier sought to become Sadasiva Raya's co-regent but was prevented from doing so by his uncle, Tirumala Deva Raya. He therefore appears to have sought the help of Ali Adil Shah I to overcome his uncle and establish himself as the supreme ruler of the empire. Ali Adil Shah I welcomed the opportunity, as it also offered a chance to expand his own territories. He marched with an army to Penukonda with the aim of placing Peda Tirumala, the son of Rama Raya on the throne and removing Tirumala Deva Raya who was then in weak position to defend himself.

An army under Khizr Khan marched to Penukonda and laid siege to the newly rebuilt fort. However, Ali Adil Shah I's hopes of taking advantage of the troubles in Vijayanagara were soon went in vain. Savaram Chennappa Nayaka, the fort's commander defeated Khizr Khan's army and forced him to retreat.

== Aftermath ==
At the same time, Tirumala Deva Raya who had learned diplomacy under Rama Raya, sent an ambassador to the court of Ahmadnagar to win the support of the Nizam Shah against Bijapur Sultanate. Khunza Sultana who ruled the kingdom on behalf of Murtaza Nizam Shah I was unwilling to see Bijapur grow stronger. Acting on the advice of Mulla Inayatullah, she took her son and marched towards Bijapur with an army. forcing Ali Adil Shah I to withdraw quickly from Vijayanagara domains.
