= Siege of Penukonda (1568) =

- Part of Deccani–Vijayanagar wars
Date	1568
Location	Penukonda, Andhra Pradesh, India 14.0850°N 77.5960°E
Result	Vijaynagara victory

Belligerents
Vijayanagara Empire	Bijapur Sultanate

Commanders and leaders
Tirumala Deva Raya; Savaram Chennappa Nayaka	Ali Adil Shah I Mali Khan
- Location within South Asia

The Siege of Penukonda (1568) was a conflict between the Vijayanagara Empire under Tirumala Deva Raya and the Bijapur Sultanate under Ali Adil Shah I. Ali Adil Shah sent an army under Mali Khan to besiege Penukonda to prevent Tirumala from sending help to Adoni which was under attack by the Bijapur army. The fort was defended by Savaram Chennappa Nayaka, who defeated Mali Khan and forced his army to withdraw.

== Background ==
After successfully defending his capital Penukonda in 1567, Tirumala was invited by the Murtaza Nizam Shah I and the Ibrahim Quli Qutb Shah Wali to join them against Ali Adil Shah I with whom they were at war. In response, Tirumala sent one of his sons with an army of ten thousand troops. The alliance brought Tirumala little benefit. Instead, it led to another attack by Ali Adil Shah I after settling his differences with the rulers of Ahmadnagar and Golconda Ali Adil Shah turned against Tirumala to punish him for joining his enemies.

== Siege ==
In 1568, Ali Adil Shah I marched with an army against Adoni an important fort on the banks of the Tungabhadra River that blocked the advance of the Sultanate armies into the south. He fought several battles with its chief Koneti Kondamaraju and eventually forced him to withdraw into the fort, which Ali Adil Shah I then besieged.

At the same time, Ali Adil Shah I sent an army under Mali Khan against Penukonda to prevent any help from reaching Adoni. On reaching Penukonda Mali Khan laid siege to the fort but was defeated and driven away by Savaram Chennappa Nayaka. Although Penukonda was successfully defended against the Bijapur army Adoni fell to the Bijapur forces, as its chief was unable to resist the large army of the Bijapur Sultan on his own.

== Aftermath ==
Despite losing territories such as Adoni, Tirumala managed to keep most of the empire together. He was supported by several powerful Nayaks who remained loyal to the empire. Savaram Chennappa Nayaka also gave considerable help to Tirumala by successfully defending the new capital of Penukonda against several attacks by the Bijapur Sultanate.

== See also ==
- Battle of Talikota
- Sadasiva Raya
- Hussain Nizam Shah I
