= Burhan Nizam Shah II =

Sultan of Ahmadnagar from 1591 to 1595

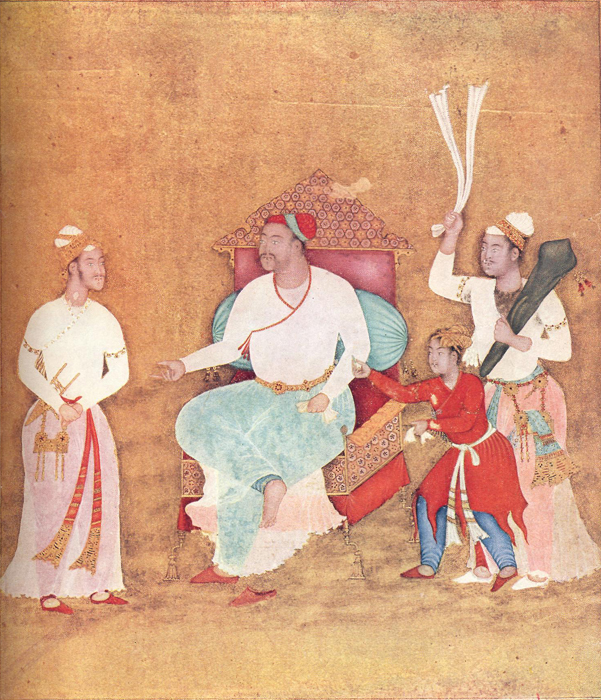
- Portrait of Burhan Nizam Shah II.

7th Sultan of Ahmadnagar
- Reign: 15 May 1591 – 18 April 1595
- Predecessor: Ismail Nizam Shah
- Successor: Ibrahim Nizam Shah
- Died: 18 April 1595
- Spouse: Daughter of Jujhar Khan
- Issue: Ismail Nizam Shah; Ibrahim Nizam Shah
- House: Nizam Shahi Dynasty
- Father: Hussain Nizam Shah I
- Mother: Khunza Humayun
- Religion: Islam

Burhan Nizam Shah II (ruled 1591–1595) was the ruler of Ahmadnagar Sultanate in the Deccan. He was the second son of Hussain Nizam Shah I and Khunza Humayun Begum.

== Background ==
Burhan was imprisoned alongside his mother by his elder brother Murtaza Nizam Shah I, though he escaped in 1580. He subsequently attempted two rebellions against Murtaza. Following the failure of the second in 1585, he fled and took asylum at the court of the Mughal emperor Akbar.

In 1591, with Akbar's approval and the promise to accept Mughal suzerainty, Burhan made another attempt to claim the throne, then held by his own 12 year-old son Ismail Nizam Shah, who had been placed there by nobles. With the backing of a large number of Nizam Shahi troops as well as support from Ibrahim Adil Shah II of Bijapur and Raja Ali Khan of Khandesh, Burhan invaded Ahmadnagar and captured Ismail, whom he forgave, and ascended the throne.

== Reign ==
Coming to the throne at an advanced age, Burhan Nizam Shah proved to be a weak and incapable monarch, addicted to women and wine. During his short rule the Mahdawi movement, which had been aggressively propagated during Ismail's reign, was criminalised, and Shia Islam was reintroduced to Ahmadnagar. Burhan angered Akbar by ignoring the earlier pledge to acknowledge the suzerainty of the latter and mistreated Mughal envoys. He also quarrelled with Ibrahim Adil Shah II, leading a failed invasion of Bijapur and later supporting Ibrahim's rebellious brother.

Burhan died on 18 April 1595, having rode out to defeat a rebellion while suffering from chronic dysentery. His son Ibrahim Nizam Shah succeeded him, though himself was killed in a skirmish against Bijapur after a reign of only four months. A civil war subsequently ensued over who should rule, with the eventual victor being Burhan's sister Chand Bibi, who ruled in the name of his infant grandson.

== Sources ==
- John F. Richards. The New Cambridge History of India: The Mughals. New York: Cambridge University Press, 1993. p. 51.
- Campbell, James M. (1884), Gazetteer of the Bombay Presidency, vol. XVII: Ahmadnagar, Bombay: Government Central Press
- Shyam, Radhey (1966), The Kingdom of Ahmadnagar, Motilal Banarsidass Publ., ISBN 978-81-208-2651-9
