= Tarif-i Husain Shahi =

16th-century illustrated manuscript

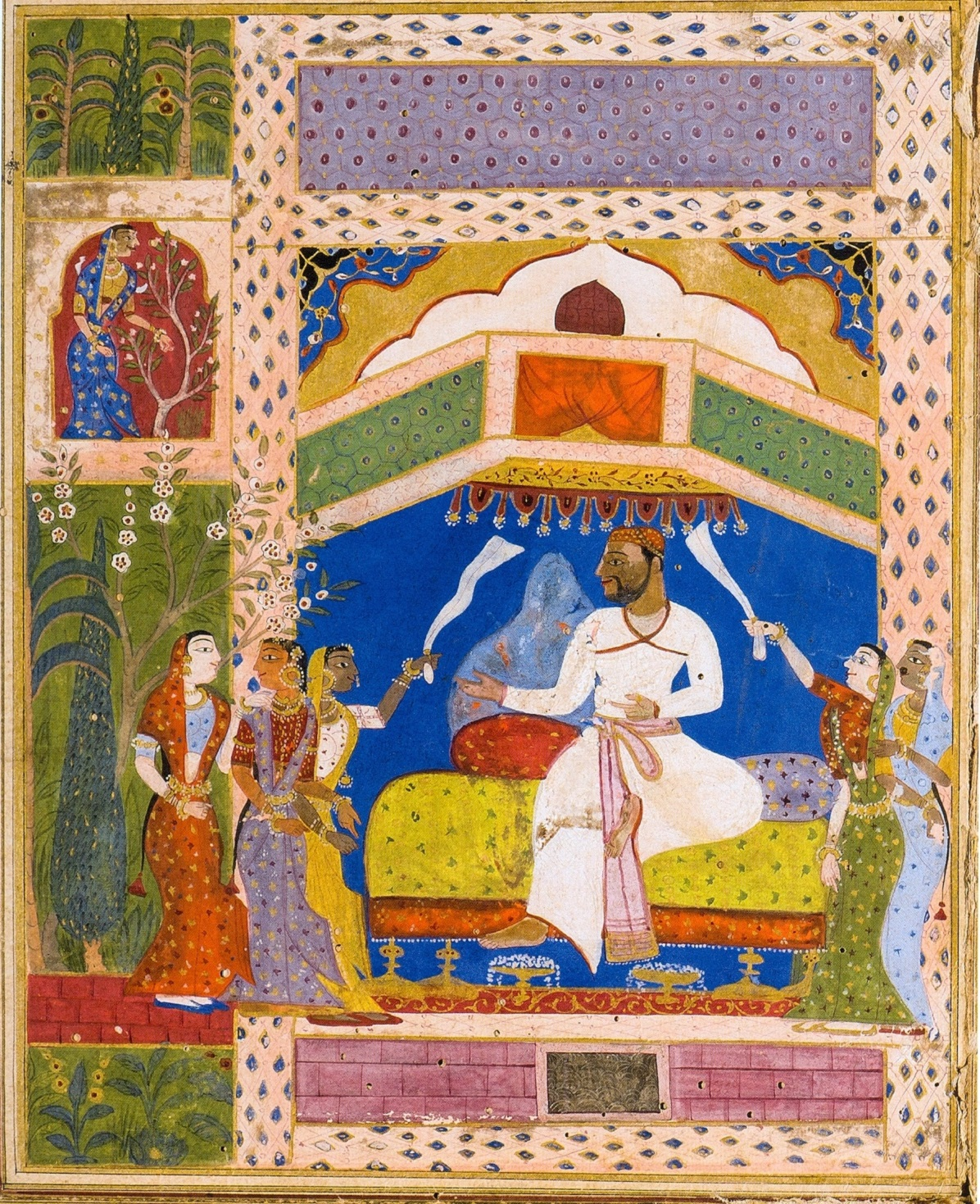
- Folio 20b, Sultan Husain Nizam Shah enthroned. The image of the queen has been scraped off, and she can only be seen as a silhouette
- Author: Aftabi
- Language: Persian
- Publication date: c. 1565

Kitab-i Tarif-i Husain Shah Padshah-i Dakan (Chronicle of Husain Shah, King of the Deccan), generally known as Tarif-i Husain Shahi or Tarif-i Husain Shah is a 16th-century illustrated manuscript compiled in the Ahmadnagar Sultanate.

It is written in praise of the king Husain Nizam Shah and his queen consort, Khunza Humayun. The sultan's victory at the battle of Talikota is a prominent feature of both the text and the illustrations. It is located at the Bharat Itihas Sanshodhak Mandal.

== History ==
It is dated to the middle of the 16th-century. Stella Kramrisch suggested that the manuscript may not have been a royal commission, given the indigenous style of the paintings. However, modern scholars including Pushkar Sohoni and Mark Zebrowski agree that it was compiled with royal patronage.

It is a matter of contention among scholars as to whether the manuscript was completed by the time of Husain Nizam Shah's death. Zebrowski points out that since his death is not mentioned, it must have been produced between the victory at Talikota, in early 1565 and Husain Shah's death, later the same year. However, the fact that Khunza Humayun features so prominently in both the text and the illustrations suggests that it might have been completed during her regency.

== Text ==
It belongs to the mathnawi genre.

== Paintings ==
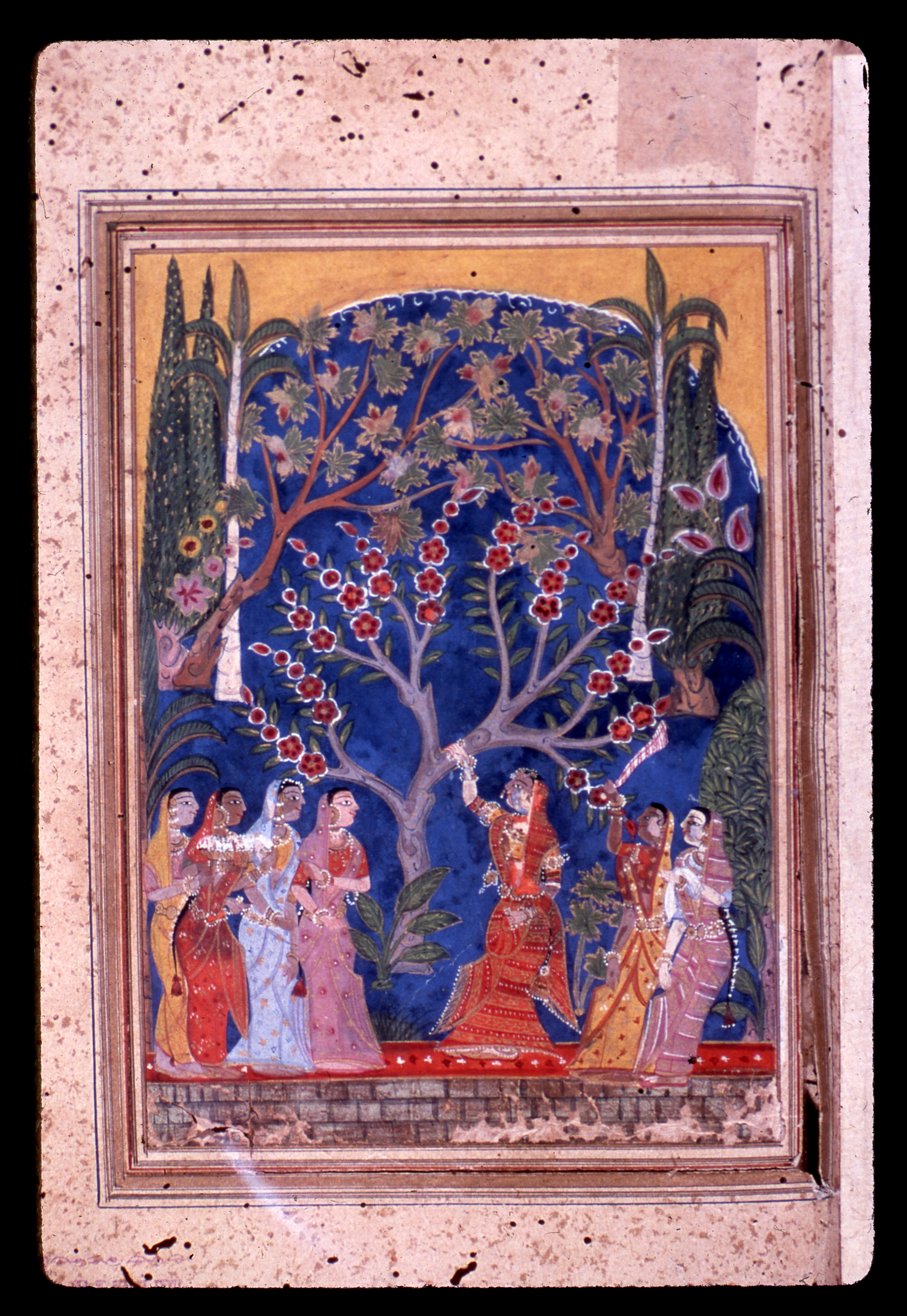
Folio 29a depicts the dohada theme.

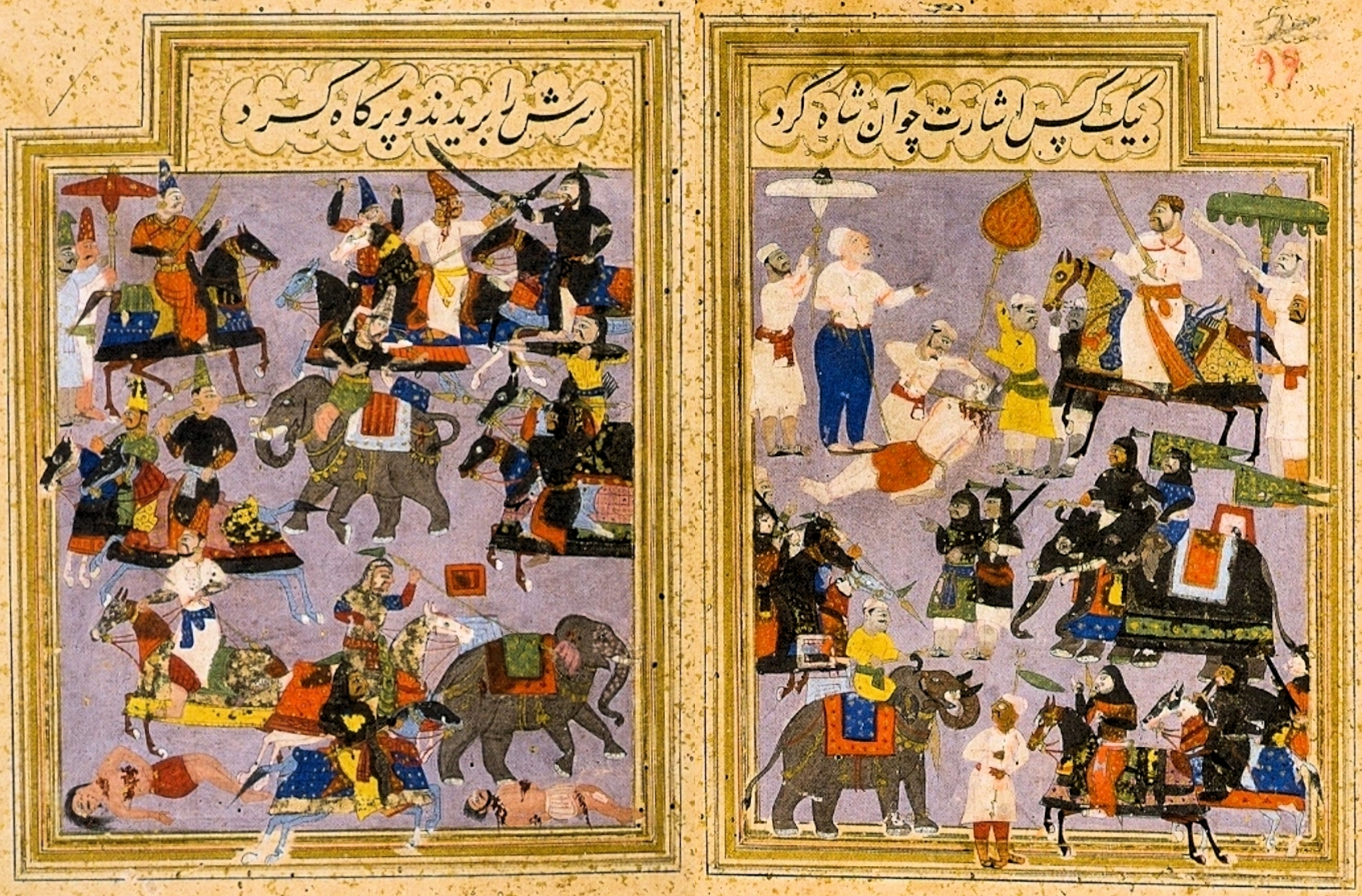
Battle of Talikota

It originally contained fourteen illustrations, of which 12 survive. All of the paintings are in a vertical format, and the size ranges from 18 by 12 cm to 18 by 15 cm. The paintings have little to do with the text.

Five of the paintings illustrate courtly life, and six illustrate the campaign against Vijayanagara. Thus, eleven of the twelve paintings depict razm-o-bazm (feasting and fighting), which commonly features in Persian art.

The folios 20b, 21b, 26b, 36a and 40b depict court life. In these, the queen Khunza Humayun was featured, in Indian poses, such as sitting on her husband's lap. Such poses were common in the representation of Hindu gods. These paintings were unorthodox for a work commissioned for the court of a Muslim kingdom. The images of the queen have been scraped off, probably during the reign of her son Murtaza I.

The folio 29a shows the dohada theme, where a tree blooms at the touch of a young woman. The young woman here is the queen Khunza Humayun, and the painting symbolizes the kingdom's prosperity during her reign. However, her image is not scraped off. Six women surround her, all being dressed in saris.

The folios 34b, 43b, 44a, 45b, 46b and 47a depict the campaign against Vijayanagara. Husain Shah is seen in five of these paintings.

== Bibliography ==
- Sohoni, Pushkar (2018). The Architecture of a Deccan Sultanate: Courtly Practice and Royal Authority in Late Medieval India. I. B. Tauris & Co. Ltd.
- Zebrowski, Mark (1983). Deccani painting. Roli Books International, New Delhi.
