= Vidarbha (disambiguation) =

Vidarbha is geographical region in eastern Maharashtra in the Deccan region of India.

Vidarbha may also refer to:

- Vidarbha (tribe), an ancient Indian tribe of the Deccan
- Vidarbha kingdom, an ancient Indian kingdom
- Vidarbha kingdom (Mauryan era), an ancient Indian kingdom during the Maurya Empire era
- Vidarbha movement, movement for a proposed separate state in India, comprising the Vidarbha region
- Vidarbha Janata Congress, a political party in Maharashtra, India
- Vidarbha Vikas Party, a political party in Maharashtra, India

== Other uses ==
- Vidarbha Cricket Association, a cricket organization in the Vidarbha region
  - Vidarbha Cricket Association Stadium, a cricket stadium in Maharashtra, India
  - Vidarbha cricket team, an Indian cricket team
- Vidarbha Hockey Association Stadium, a hockey stadium in Maharashtra, India
- Vidarbha Superfast Express, Indian Railways train serving the Vidarbha region of India

== See also ==
- Berar (disambiguation)
