= Sayyid Murtaza Sabzavari =

Sayyid Murtaza Sabzavari (died after 1602) was an Iranian-born commander in the Ahmadnagar Sultanate and later the Mughal Empire.

== Sources ==
- Overton, Keelan (2020). "Introduction to Iranian Mobilities and Persianate Mediations in the Deccan". In Overton, Keelan (ed.). Iran and the Deccan: Persianate Art, Culture, and Talent in Circulation, 1400–1700. Indiana University Press. pp. 3–76. ISBN 978-0253048912.
