= Khunza Humayun Begum =

Regent of the Ahmadnagar Sultanate

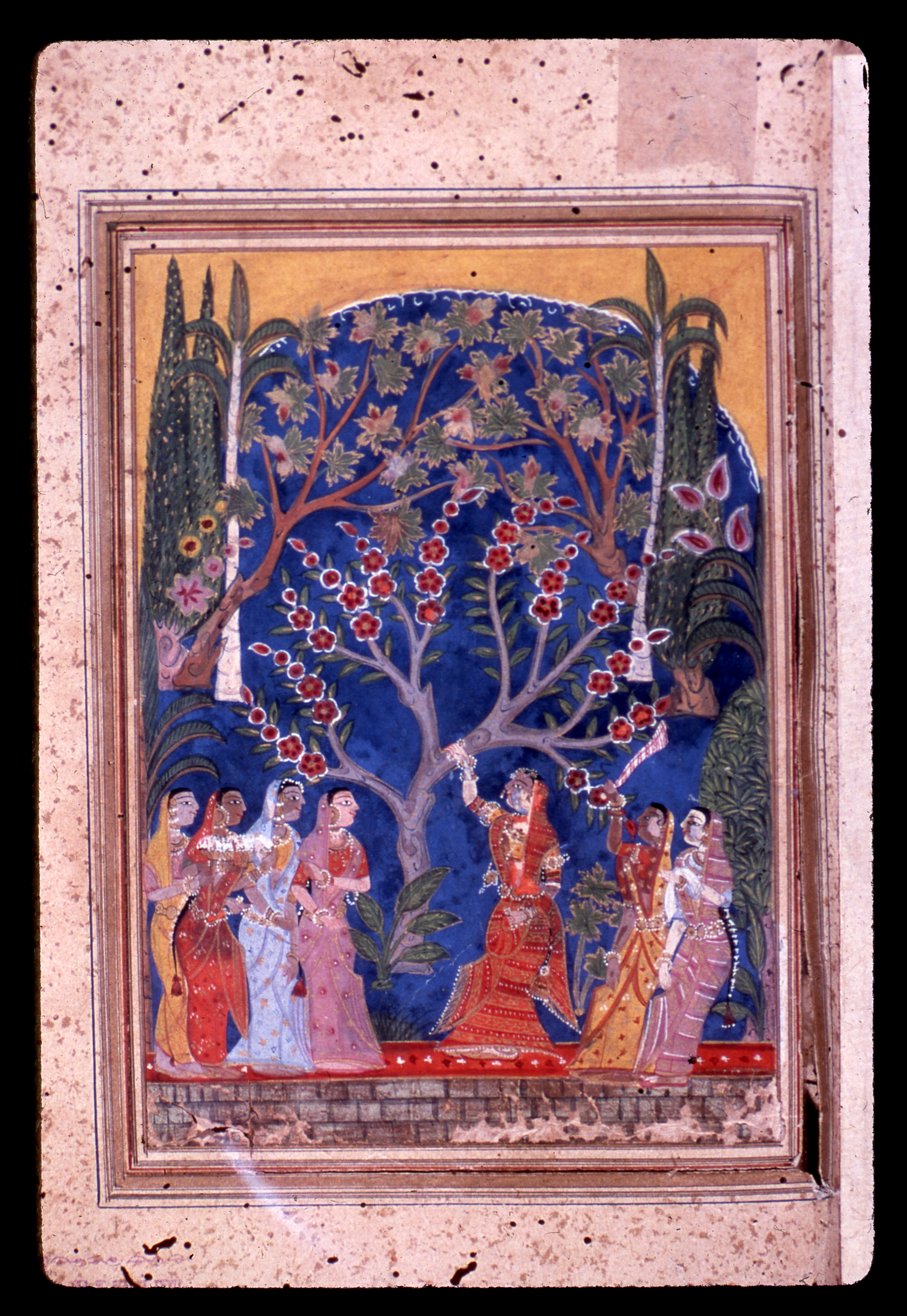
A tree blossoms at the touch of Khunza Humayun, the dohada theme. Tarif-i Husain Shahi

Khunza Humayun Begum also known as Kurja Sultana, Khanzada Humayun Sultana and Khunzah Humayun (fl. 1571), was the regent of the Ahmadnagar Sultanate between 1565 and 1571, during the minority of her son sultan Murtaza Nizam Shah I.

== Life ==
Khunza Humayun Begum was married to sultan Hussain Nizam Shah I. She became the mother of Murtaza Nizam Shah I.

In 1565, she was widowed, and her son ascended to the throne. As her son was a minor, a regency was appointed to rule, and she became his regent. She was described as a distinguished person of ability, talent and virtues. She appointed first Qasim Beg Tabrezi, then Maulana Inayatullah to the post of Wakil and Peshwa, but they could not come to terms with her, and she finally appointed her three brothers Taj Khan, Ain-ul-Mulk and Itibar Khan to share the office.

She conducted a war against Bijapur in alliance with Venkatadari of Penukonda and Ibrahim Qutb Shah, which however ended in defeat. She conducted a second war in alliance with Tufal Khan against Bijapur, which also ended in defeat.

Her rule was unpopular because of her military failures and her favoritism of her relations. Her unpopularity came to a crucial point when the kingdom was invaded by Ali Adil Shah in 1569, who conquered Kondana and established the fort Dharur there. In 1569, there was a first attempt to have her deposed from regency and her son declared of legal majority. Her son's Quran tutor Maulana Husain Tabrezi convinced her son to allow him to hire ruffians to seize and depose her. However, her son changed his mind and alerted his mother, and the conspirators, among them Khwaja Mirak Dabir and Sayyid Murtaza, fled to Alia Adil Shah. She later pardoned them.

She and her son left for an expedition to inspect the encroachments of Kishwar Khan Lari. Two Nizam Shahi officers convinced her son to send Habsh Khan to inform his mother that "it was his pleasure that she should no longer engage in public affairs", and that she should retire to purdah like the other princesses. As a response, she mounted a horse and armed herself with a bow and sword and dagger arrest the conspirators. She was however defeated by Habsh Khan, who succeeded in having her arrested. Her brothers fled to avoid being arrested by Khwaja Mirak. She was deposed in a coup by her son, who declared himself of majority with the support of the Nizam Shahi nobility. She was imprisoned in the Shivaner Fortress.

== Issue ==
- Murtaza Nizam Shah I, Sultan of Ahmednagar;
- Burhan Nizam Shah II, Sultan of Ahmednagar;
- Chand Bibi, married Sultan Ali Adil Shah I of Bijapur. Later became regent of Bijapur and Ahmednagar successively;
- Bibi Khadija, married Jamal-ud-din Hansan Auju
