= VVP =

VVP may refer to:

- Venus Vacation Prism, a spin-off game from the Dead or Alive Xtreme series
- Vidarbha Vikas Party, an Indian political party
- Vladimir Putin (born Vladimir Vladimirovich Putin), president of Russia
- Vrienden van het Platteland, a former Dutch women's cycling team

== See also ==
- VVP Soft UAV, an unmanned helicopter
- Yakovlev VVP-6, an experimental military helicopter
