= Chand Bibi =

Sultana Chand Bibi
- Regent of Bijapur and Ahmednagar
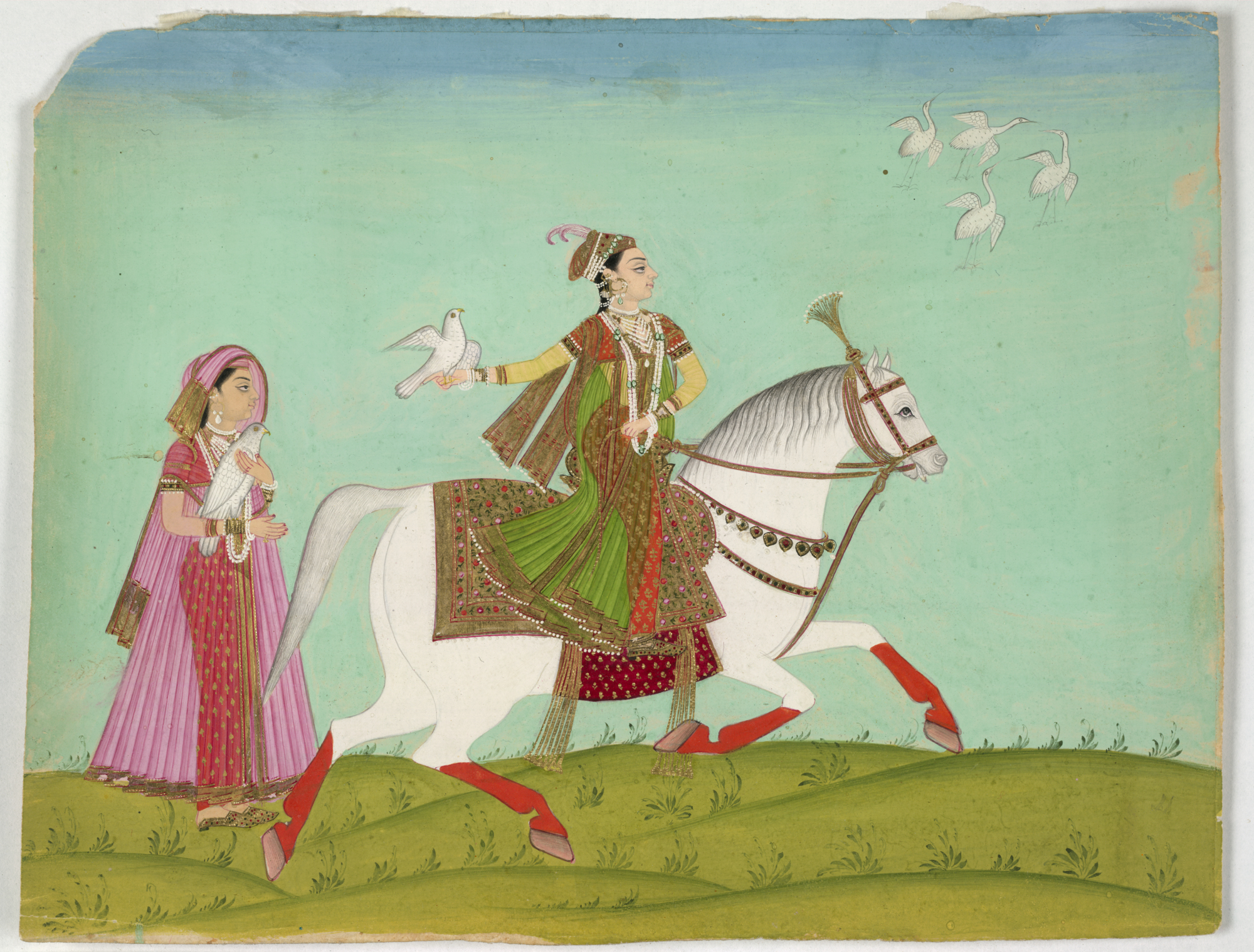
- Chand Bibi hawking, an 18th-century painting
- Born: 1550; Ahmednagar Fort, Ahmadnagar Sultanate (now in Maharashtra, India)
- Died: 18 April 1600 (aged 49–50)
- Spouse: Ali Adil Shah I
- House: Nizam Shahi (by birth) Adil Shahi (by marriage)
- Father: Hussain Nizam Shah I
- Mother: Khunza Humayun Begum
- Religion: Shia Islam

Sultana Chand Bibi (1550 – 18 April 1600) was the regent of the Bijapur Sultanate during the minority of Ibrahim Adil Shah II in 1580–1590, and the regent of the Ahmednagar Sultanate during the minority of her great nephew Bahadur Shah in 1595–1600. Chand Bibi is best known for defending Ahmednagar against the Mughal forces of Emperor Akbar in 1595.

== Early life ==
Chand Bibi was the daughter of Hussain Nizam Shah I of Ahmednagar, India and the sister of Burhan Nizam Shah II, the Sultan of Ahmednagar. She was versed in many languages, including Arabic, Persian, Turkish, Marathi and Kannada. She played the setar and painting flowers was her hobby.

== Bijapur Sultanate ==
Following an alliance policy, Chand Bibi was married to Ali Adil Shah I of the Bijapur Sultanate. A stepwell (bawdi) constructed near the eastern boundary of Bijapur by her husband was named Chand Bawdi after her.

Ali Adil Shah's father, Ibrahim Adil Shah I, had divided power between the Sunni nobles, the Habshis and the Deccanis. However, Ali Adil Shah favored Shi'as. After his death in 1580, the Shi'a nobles proclaimed his nine-year-old nephew Ibrahim Adil Shah II as the ruler. A Deccani general called Kamal Khan seized power and became the regent. Kamal Khan was disrespectful towards Chand Bibi, who felt that he had ambitions to usurp the throne. Chand Bibi plotted an attack against Kamal Khan with help from another general, Haji Kishvar Khan. Kamal Khan was captured while fleeing and was beheaded in the fort.

Kishvar Khan became the second regent of Ibrahim. In a battle against the Ahmednagar Sultanate at Dharaseo, the Bijapur army led by him captured all the artillery and elephants of the enemy army. After the victory, Kishvar Khan ordered other Bijapuri generals to surrender all the captured elephants to him. The elephants were highly valued, and the other generals took great offense. Along with Chand Bibi, they hatched a plan to eliminate Kishvar Khan with help from General Mustafa Khan of Bankapur. Kishvar Khan's spies informed him of the conspiracy, and he sent troops against Mustafa Khan, who was captured and killed in the battle. Chand Bibi challenged Kishvar Khan, but he got her imprisoned at the Satara fort and tried to declare himself the king. However, Kishvar Khan became very unpopular among the rest of the generals. He was forced to flee when a joint army led by a Habshi general called Ikhlas Khan marched to Bijapur. The army consisted of the forces of three Habshi nobles: Ikhlas Khan, Hamid Khan and Dilavar Khan. Kishvar Khan tried his luck at Ahmednagar unsuccessfully, and then fled to Golconda. He was killed in exile by a relative of Mustafa Khan. Following this, Chand Bibi acted as the regent for a short time.

Ikhlas Khan then became the regent, but he was dismissed by Chand Bibi shortly afterwards. Later, he resumed his dictatorship, which was soon challenged by the other Habshi generals. Taking advantage of the situation in Bijapur, Ahmednagar's Nizam Shahi sultan allied with the Qutb Shahi of Golconda to attack Bijapur. The troops available at Bijapur were not sufficient to repulse the joint attack. The Habshi generals realized that they could not defend the city alone, and tended their resignation to Chand Bibi. Abu-ul-Hassan, a Shi'a general appointed by Chand Bibi, called for the Maratha forces in Carnatic. The Marathas attacked the invaders' supply lines, forcing the Ahmednagar-Golconda allied army to retreat.

Ikhlas Khan then attacked Dilavar Khan to seize the control of Bijapur. However, he was defeated, and Dilavar Khan became the regent from 1582 to 1591. When order was restored in Bijapur kingdom, Chand Bibi returned to Ahmednagar.

== Ahmednagar Sultanate ==
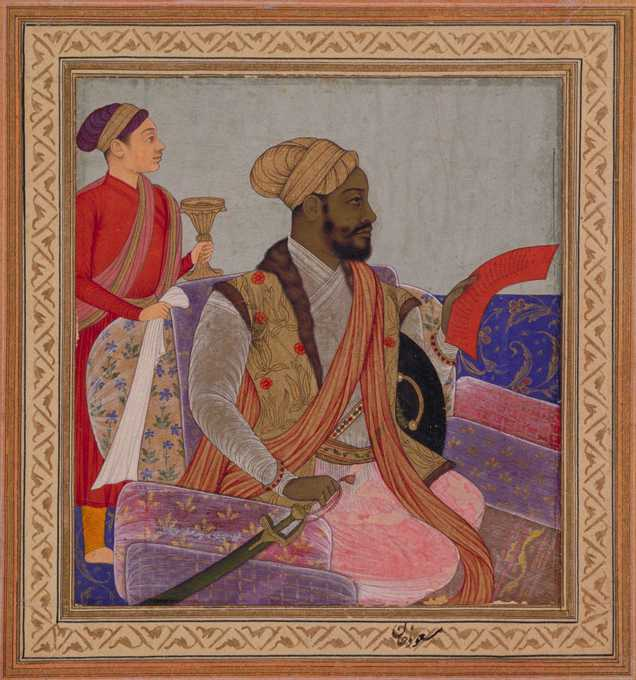
Ikhlas Khan chief minister of Ali Adil Shah of Bijapur

In 1591, the Mughal emperor Akbar had asked all the four Deccan sultanates to acknowledge his supremacy. All the sultanates evaded compliance, and Akbar's ambassadors returned in 1593. In 1595, Ibrahim Nizam Shah, the ruler of Ahmednagar Sultanate was killed in a severe battle about 40 miles from Ahmednagar at Shahdurg against Ibrahim Adil Shah II of Bijapur. After his death, some nobles felt that his infant son Bahadur Shah should be proclaimed the King under the regency of Chand Bibi (his father's aunt).

However, the Deccani minister Miyan Manju proclaimed the twelve-year-old son of Shah Tahir, Ahmad Nizam Shah II, as the ruler on 6 August 1595. The Habshi nobles of Ahmednagar, led by Ikhlas Khan, were opposed to this plan. The rising dissent among the nobles prompted Miyan Manju to invite Akbar's son Murad Mirza (who was in Gujarat) to march his army to Ahmednagar. Murad came to Malwa, where he joined Mughal forces led by Abdul Rahim Khan-I-Khana. Raja Ali Khan joined them at Mandu, and the united army advanced on Ahmednagar.

However, while Murad was on march to Ahmednagar, many noblemen left Ikhlas Khan and joined Miyan Manju. Miyan Manju defeated Ikhlas Khan and other opponents. Now, he regretted having invited the Mughals, but it was too late. He requested Chand Bibi to accept the regency, and marched out of Ahmednagar with Ahmed Shah II. Ikhlas Khan also escaped to Paithan, where he was attacked and defeated by the Mughals.

Chand Bibi accepted the regency and proclaimed Bahadur Shah king of Ahmednagar.

=== Defence of Ahmednagar ===
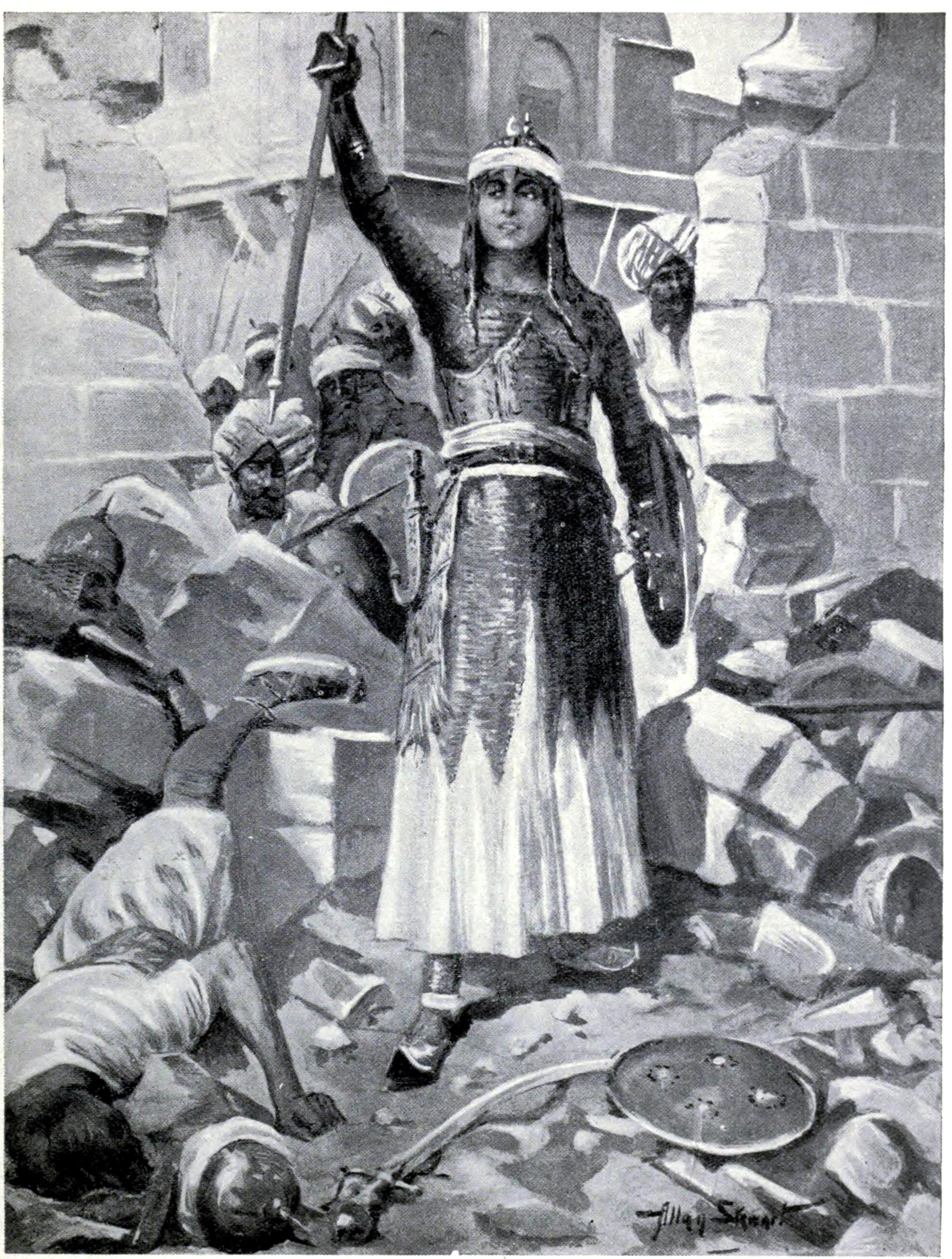
Princess Chand Bibi defends Ahmadnagar 1595

Ahmednagar was invaded by the Mughals in November 1595. Chand Bibi took the leadership in Ahmednagar and defended the Ahmednagar fort successfully. Later, Shah Murad sent an envoy to Chand Bibi, offering to raise the siege in return for the cession of Berar. Chand Bibi's troops were suffering from famine. On 23 February 1596, she decided to make peace by ceding Berar to Murad, who retreated.

Chand Bibi appealed to her nephews Ibrahim Adil Shah II of Bijapur and Muhammad Quli Qutb Shah of Golconda, asking them to unite against the Mughal forces. Ibrahim Adil Shah II sent a contingent of 25,000 men under Sohail Khan, which was joined by the remainder of Yekhlas Khan's force at Naldurg. Later, it was joined by a contingent of 6,000 men from Golconda.

Chand Bibi had appointed Muhammad Khan as the minister, but he proved treacherous. He made overtures to the Khan-I-Khana, offering to surrender the whole Sultanate to the Mughals. Meanwhile, Khan-I-Khana started taking possession of districts that were not included in the cession of Berar. Sohail Khan, who was returning to Bijapur, was ordered to come back and attack Khan-I-Khana's Mughal forces. The Mughal forces under Khan-I-Khana and Mirza Shah Rukh left Murad's camp at Sahpur in Berar and encountered the combined forces of Bijapur, Ahmadnagar, and Golconda under Sohail Khan near Sonpet (or Supa) on the banks of Godavari River. In a fierce battle on 8–9 February 1597, the Mughals won.

In spite of their victory, the Mughal forces were too weak to pursue their attack and returned to Sahpur. One of their commanders, Raja Ali Khan, was killed in the battle and there were frequent disputes between other commanders. Due to these disputes, Khan-I-Khana was recalled by Akbar in 1597. Prince Murad died shortly thereafter. Akbar then sent his son Daniyal and Khan-I-Khana with fresh troops. Akbar himself followed and encamped at Barhanpur.

In Ahmednagar, Chand Bibi's authority was being resisted by the newly appointed minister Nehang Khan. Nehang Khan had recaptured the town of Beed, taking advantage of Khan-I-Khana's absence and of the rainy season. In 1599, Akbar dispatched Daniyal, Mirza Yusuf Khan and Khan-I-Khana to relieve the governor of Beed. Nehang Khan also marched to seize the Jaipur Kotli pass, expecting the Mughals to meet him there. However, Daniyal avoided the pass and reached Ahmednagar fort through an alternative route. His forces laid siege to the fort.

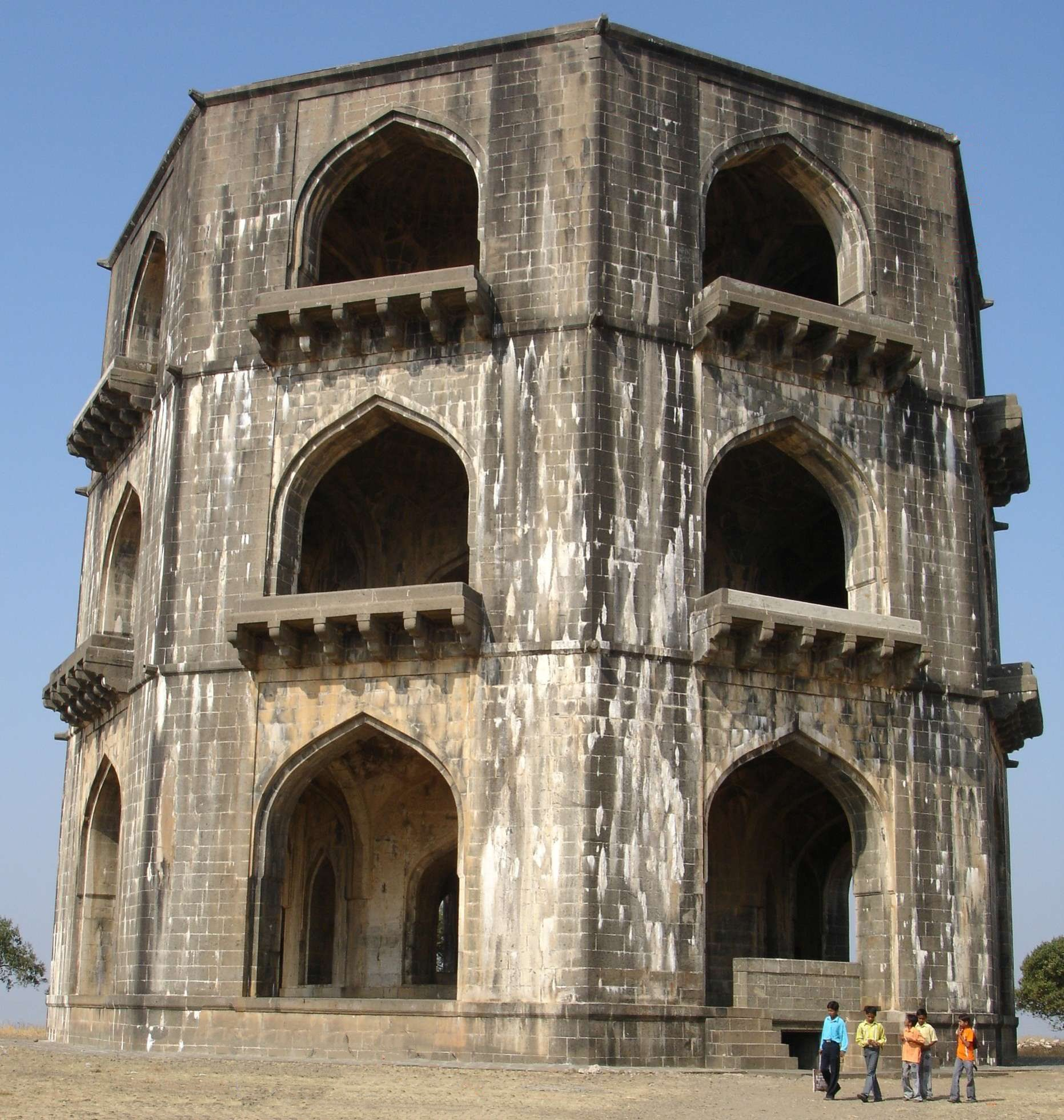
The Tomb of Salabat Khan II (wrongly thought to be Chand Bibi's Tomb), Ahmednagar

Chand Bibi again defended the fort. However, she could not bring about an effective resistance, and decided to negotiate terms with Daniyal. Hamid Khan, a nobleman, exaggerated and spread the false news that Chand Bibi was in treaty with the Mughals. According to another version, Jita Khan, a eunuch valet of Chand Bibi, thought that her decision to negotiate with the Mughals was treacherous and spread the news that Chand Bibi was betraying the fort. Chand Bibi was then killed by an enraged mob of her own troops. After her death, and a siege of four months and four days, Ahmednagar was captured by the Mughal forces of Daniyal and Mirza Yusuf Khan on 18 August 1600.

== Chand Bibi's Palace ==
The Tomb of Salabat Khan II is wrongly known locally as "Chand bibi ka Mahal [Chand Bibi's Palace]" and similar names.

== In popular culture ==
Indian filmmaker Narayanrao D. Sarpotdar made Chandbibi (or Queen of Ahmednagar) a silent film in 1931. Sultana Chand bibi, an Indian Hindi-language film about the queen, starring Shakuntala Paranjpye released in 1937.

== Burial place ==
Mirabutorab Torabi Mashhadi received a mission from Nizam Shah of Deccan to bring the bones of Chand Bibi to Mashhad and bury them next to the Imam Reza shrine.

== See also ==
- History of women in early modern warfare
