= Anjuman-e-Mahdavia =

Markazi Anjuman-e-Mahdavia, also known as Anjuman, is the most important community center for the Mahdavia community of Hyderabad, India.

In the early 20th century, Mahdavia community leaders held meetings at the home of Haji Muhammad Ali Khan. On 15 Muharram 1320 AH (24 April 1902), as a result of these assemblies, the center was founded.

== Presidents ==
- Janab Syed Yaqoob Sahib s/o Sayed Nusrat (1913 to 1917)
- Peer-wo-Murshid Syed Shahabuddin Sahib (December 1917 to June 1919)
- Khan Sahib Babu Khan Sahib (1919 to 1926)
- Lisan al-Ummat Qaaed-e-Millat Nawab Bahadur Khan Sahib Yar Jung (1926 to 1944)
- Janab Abul Hassan Syed Ali Sahib Advocate (1944 to 1950)
- Nawab Mandoor Khan Sahib (Jan 1951 to Dec 1953)
- Nawab Aziz Ahmed Khan Sahib (February 1954 to May 1958)
- Dr. Mohammed Bahadur Khan Salje (May 1955 to March 1958) (President ADHOC Committee)
- Janab Mohammed Saleem Khan Sahib Bozai (April 1958 to October 1962)
- Al-Hajj Mohammed Khader Khan Sahib (1963 to 1968)
- Janab Moinuddin Shaik Imam Sahib (1968 to 1970)
- Al-Hajj Mohammed Khader Khan Sahib (1970 to 1972)
- Dr. Mohammed Mahboob Khan Sahib (1972 to 1973)
- Janab Syed Ali Akber Sahib (1973 to 1974)
- Janab Mohammed Nasseruddin Sahib (1974 to 1976)
- Dr. Mohammed Mahboob Khan Sahib (1977 to 1980)
- Janab Syed Ali Akber Sahib (1981 to 1984)
- Dr. Mohammed Mahboob Ali Khan Sahib (1985 to 1992)
- Mirza Samiullah Baig Sahib (1993 to 1996)
- Janab Sardar Shah Mohammed Khan Sahib (Advocate) (1996 to 2000)
- Siraj-e-Millat Peer-wo-Murshid Syed Attan Shahab Mehdavi (2001 to 2003)
- Janab Sarwar Ali Khan Sahib (2004 to 2006)
- Al-Hajj Janab Adil Mohammed Khan Bozai Mahdavee (2007 to 2019)
- Peer-wo-Murshid Syed Mahmood Shahabuddin Kashif Miyan Sahab (2020 to 2024)
- Munawar Khan Nagad (2024 to Present)

== See also ==
- Mahdavi movement
