= Siege of Adoni (1556) =

1556 battle

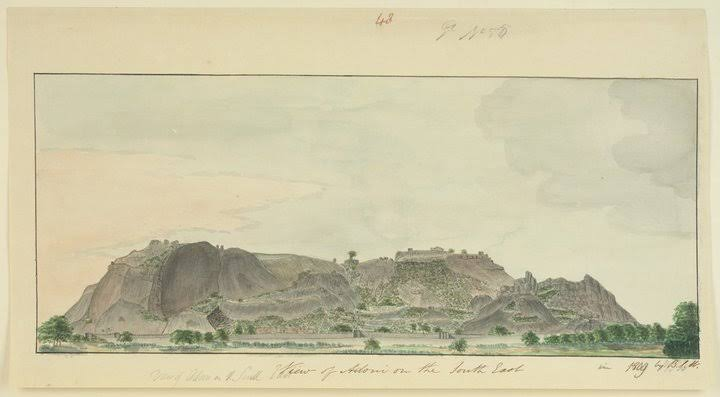
- Watercolour Painting of Adoni fort by Benjamin Swain Ward (1786-1835)
Date	1556
Location	Adoni, Andhra Pradesh, India
Result	Vijayanagara victory

Belligerents
Vijayanagara Empire; Golconda Sultanate	Rebels

Commanders and leaders
Rama Raya; Siddaraja Timappa; Tajalli Khan; Nur Khan; Qubul Khan; Hamid Khan	Tim Raj (surrendered); Govind Raj (surrendered)

The Siege of Adoni was a military conflict when Rama Raya’s brothers, Timraj and Govindraj, took control of Adoni and nearby areas while Rama Raya was away. After returning, Rama Raya tried to make peace, but they refused. Unable to defeat them alone, he asked the Sultan of Golconda for help. The Sultan Ibrahim Qutub Shah Wali sent a large army led by Qubul Khan and other generals. They joined forces with Vijayanagara troops and laid siege to the fort of Adoni. The rebels fought bravely, and the battle lasted six months with heavy fighting. Finally, the rebels surrendered. Rama Raya thanked the Golconda generals, and Sultan Ibrahim Qutub Shah Wali gave Qubul Khan the title Mujahid Khan Ainu’l-Mulk for his success.

== Background ==
While Rama Raya was away from his capital, helping the Sultan of Bijapur against Ahmadnagar, his two brothers, Timraj and Govindraj, took advantage of his absence. They were in charge of Adoni, they took control of the region and gathered an army. They forced several nearby districts to come under their rule. When Rama Raya returned to Vijayanagara he first sent letters to his brothers asking them to stop their rebellion, but they ignored his message, trusting in their own power. Since Rama Raya could not defeat them alone, he decided to send ambassadors to the court of Golconda to ask for help.

The Sultan of Golconda, who preferred to keep peace with his neighbors, agreed to help Rama Raya. He sent a large army made up of 6,000 horsemen, 12,000 foot soldiers, and many cannons. The army was led by Qubul Khan, Sarnaubat Zahirul-mulk Hamid Khan, and other important nobles and generals. When this army from Golconda arrived, Rama Raya welcomed them warmly and showed his gratitude by giving royal robes of honor to the commanders.

== Siege ==
The combined army, along with some Vijayanagara troops including commanders like Siddaraja Timappa, Tajalli Khan and Nur Khan marched to Adoni. The rebel brothers were determined to defend the Adoni fort which was one of the largest in the Vijayanagara Empire. They gathered all the weapons and defenses they could find. Fierce fighting followed, with direct attacks, hand-to-hand combat, and heavy bloodshed. The siege lasted for six long months. At last, the rebels gave up, sent a message to Rama Raya and accepted defeat, offering their loyalty to him.

== Aftermath ==
Since the victory was mainly due to the efforts of the Golconda army, Rama Raya thanked the generals from Telangana for their great support. On the other side, Sultan Ibrahim Qutub Shah Wali of Golconda was very happy with his commander Qubul Khan's success. He gave Qubul Khan the honorable title of Mujahid Khan Ainu'l-Mulk, which he became known by later in life. Ibrahim also rewarded and promoted other officers who took part in the campaign.

== See also ==
- Rama Raya – Regent of Vijayanagara from 1542 to 1565
- Tirumala Deva Raya – Emperor of Vijayanagara from 1570 to 1572
- Vijayanagara Empire – Karnata Empire in southern India (1336–1646)
