= Bahadur Nizam Shah =

Sultan of Ahmadnagar from 1595 to 1600

8th Sultan of Ahmadnagar
- Reign: 6 August 1595 – 18 August 1600
- Predecessor: Burhan Nizam Shah II
- Successor: Murtaza Nizam Shah II
- Regent: Chand Bibi
- Born: 1593
- Died: Unknown, after June 1633
- House: Nizam Shahi Dynasty
- Father: Ibrahim Nizam Shah

Bahadur Nizam Shah (1593 – after June 1633) was the Sultan of Ahmadnagar from 1595 to 1600. Only a small child when he gained the throne, he spent almost his entire reign under the regency of his great-aunt Chand Bibi.

== Life ==
Born in 1593, Bahadur was the only son of Sultan Ibrahim Nizam Shah. Following his father's death in battle in August 1595, various nobles pressed the rights of opposing claimants to the throne, the most prominent being his cousin Ahmad Nizam Shah II. Bahadur, who was supported by his great-aunt Chand Bibi, was captured and imprisoned by Ahmad's chief benefactor, the Prime minister Miyan Manjhu. However, the latter was forced to leave Ahmadnagar city when the Mughal emperor Akbar dispatched his army to take advantage of the chaos. Chand Bibi retook the city to oppose the Mughals and released Bahadur, proclaiming him sultan under the name Bahadur Nizam Shah.

Akbar's son Murad laid siege to the city on 18 December 1595 while Chand Bibi gained the support of the nobles for Bahadur's rule, including the powerful Bijapuri commander Ikhlas Khan. Following a failed assault by Murad which was thrown back by Chand Bibi, the Mughal prince chose to agree to a settlement in March 1596. In return for the kingdom accepting Mughal suzerainty and seceding the province of Berar, Murad withdrew his forces and recognised Bahadur as the ruler of Ahmadnagar. Chand Bibi was appointed regent for Bahadur by the nobles and administered the kingdom in his name.

However, in spite of the accord, skirmishes and intermittent fighting continued between Ahmadnagar and the Mughals. In 1599, Akbar launched another invasion of the Deccan Plateau, sending his younger son Daniyal against Ahmadnagar. After the city was besieged for several months, Chand Bibi eventually chose to surrender, on the condition of the lives of the garrison, as well as her and Bahadur being allowed to retire safely to Junnar. Disagreeing with her, one of her advisers, Hamid Khan, announced to the city that the Regent was in league with the Mughals. A frenzied mob subsequently stormed her apartments and murdered her. The ensuing confusion among the garrison rendered orderly defence impossible and on 18 August 1600, mines planted by the Mughals were detonated, resulting in the destruction of a large section of the city walls. The Mughal troops assaulted and occupied the Ahmadnagar, looting the fort of its valuables.

Bahadur himself was captured and sent, along with all the other children of the royal family, to Akbar at Burhanpur. From there, he was escorted to Gwalior Fort to be imprisoned. He was still confined to the fort in 1633, when he was also joined by his distant cousin Hussain Nizam Shah III. Bahadur's ultimate fate is unknown.
