= Berar =

Berar may refer to:

- Vidarbha, the eastern region of Maharashtra, India, historically known as Berar
- Berar Sultanate (1490–1596), one of the Deccan sultanates
- Berar Subah (1596–1724), a subah (province) of the Mughal Empire
- Berar Province (1724–1903), a province of British India under the nominal sovereignty of Hyderabad State
- Berar Division (1903–1947), a division of the Central Provinces of British India
- Central Provinces and Berar Circuit or C. P.-Berar Circuit, a Hindi film distribution circuit comprising parts of Madhya Pradesh, Chhattisgarh and Maharashtra
- Berar (ship), a sailing ship built in 1863

== See also ==
- Vidarbha (disambiguation)
- Central Provinces and Berar, a province of British India
- Berar Marathi, a dialect of the Marathi language
