= Hussain Nizam Shah I =

Sultan of Ahmadnagar from 1554 to 1565

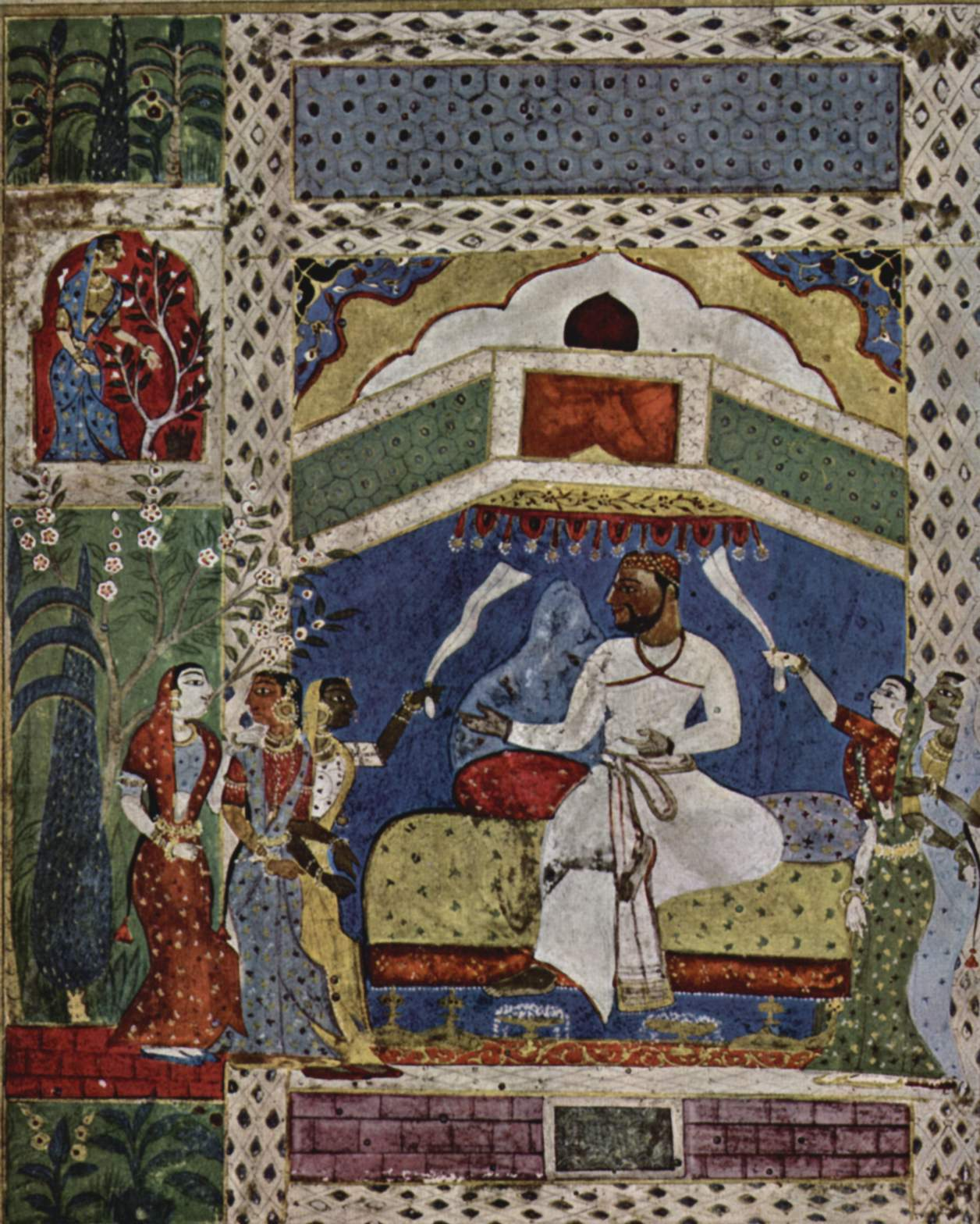
- Husain Nizam Shah I on the Throne, Folio from manuscript Ta’rif-i Husain Shahi, Ahmadnagar, ca. 1565-69

3rd Sultan of Ahmadnagar
- Reign: 9 February 1554 – 6 June 1565
- Predecessor: Burhan Nizam Shah I
- Successor: Murtaza Nizam Shah I
- Born: 1540
- Died: 6 June 1565 (aged 24–25); Ahmednagar
- Spouse: Daulat Shah Begum; Khunza Humayun Begum
- Issue: Murtaza Nizam Shah I Chand Bibi; Burhan Nizam Shah II; Bibi Khadija; Bibi Jamila; Shah Qasim; Shah Mansur; Aqa Bibi
- House: Nizam Shahi
- Father: Burhan Nizam Shah I
- Mother: Bibi Amina
- Religion: Twelver Shia Islam

Hussain Nizam Shah I (Persian: حسین نظام شاه یکم; 1540 – 6 June 1565) was the Sultan of Ahmadnagar from 9 February 1554 until his death in 1565. He ascended the throne at age thirteen after his father's death in 1554, upon which his five brothers fled the kingdom.In 1555 he faced the uprising of Raja Bahirji, the governor of the forts of Galna and Baglana alongwith Dannaya Rai, the governor of Antur Fort. Hussain Nizam Shah I, however, was successful in recapturing the forts and bringing them again under submission.

Husain Nizam Shah was the leading figure of the coalition of the Deccan Sultanates during the Battle of Talikota. Notably, Hussain Nizam Shah was responsible for taking prisoner and beheading Rama Raya of Vijayanagara after the Battle of Talikota.

== Family ==
=== Wives ===
- Daulat Shah Begum, daughter of Darya Imad Shah;
- Khunza Humayun, a great-great-granddaughter of Sultan Jahan Shah of the Qara Qoyunlu;

=== Issue ===
By Khunza Humayun:

- Murtaza Nizam Shah I, Sultan of Ahmednagar;
- Burhan Nizam Shah II, Sultan of Ahmednagar;
- Chand Bibi, married Sultan Ali Adil Shah I of Bijapur. Later became regent of Bijapur and Ahmednagar successively;
- Bibi Khadija, married Jamal-ud-din Hansan Auju;

By Surraiya Daulat Shah Begum:

- Bibi Jamila, married Sultan Ibrahim Qutb Shah of Golconda;
- Shah Qasim;
- Shah Mansur;
- Aqa Bibi, married Mir Abdul Wahhab, son of Sayyid Abdul Azum;

== See also ==
- Deccan Sultanates
- Ahmadnagar Sultanate
