= Mahdavi movement =

Mahdist Sufi mystic order

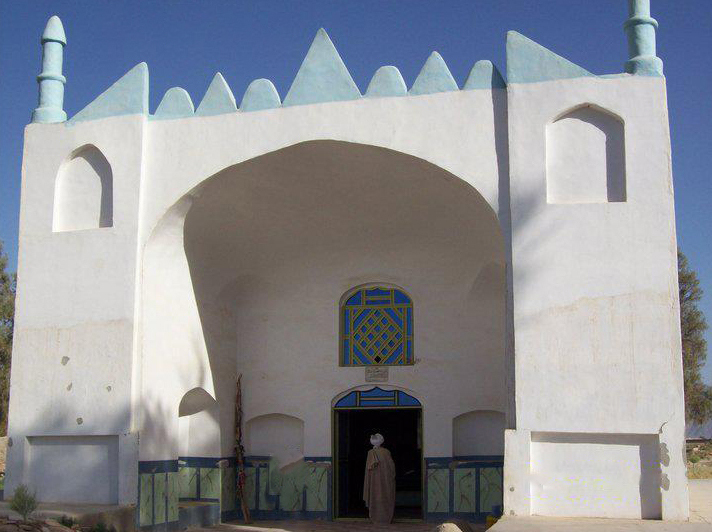
The Tomb of Syed Muhammad Jaunpuri

The Mahdavi movement, also called Mahdavia or Mahdavism, is an Islamic movement founded by Syed Muhammad Jaunpuri in India in the late 15th century. Syed Muhammad claimed to be Mahdi at the holy city of Mecca, in front of the Kaaba in 1496, and is revered as such by the Mahdavia community.

== Beliefs ==
Mahdavis are followers of Syed Muhammad Jaunpuri who declared himself to be the Mahdi.

The Mahdavis had strictly adhere to the Five Pillars of Islam, Sunnah, and Sharia, while having high respect and reverence for the House of Muhammad and his immediate progeny (Ahl-e-Bayt), the Rashidun Caliphs, and the Companions of Muhammad (Sahaba).

Mahdavis also respect all four schools of Islamic jurisprudence, but widely follow traditions similar to Hanafi jurisprudence.

They offer prayers five times a day led by their Murshids, or spiritual guides; fast during Ramadan; offer special thanks on Dugana Lailat-al-Qadr past midnight between 26 and 27 Ramadan; perform Hajj; and pay Zakat. They also attach great significance to Zikr (remembrance of Allah), after dawn Fajr prayers, and in the evening after Asr prayer.

Syed Muhammad was disturbed by the spiritual and moral degradation of Muslims. He preached a message of non-materialism and spirituality.

Mahdavis follow the seven obligations of sainthood, known as Faraiz-e-Vilayat-e-Muhammadiya. These obligations are: rejection of material lust (Tark-e-Dunya), quest for divine vision (Talab-e-Deedar-e-Ilahi), company of truthfuls and renunciants (Sohbat-e-Sadiqeen), migration (Hijrah) from place to place to avoid materialist lust, retreat and solitude (Uzlat-az-Khalq), submission to the will of God (Tawakkul), remembrance of God (Zikr-e-Ilahi) and distributing tithe (Ushr). Followers of Jaunpuri strictly follow some of these obligations in their day-to-day life. Most of them initiate renunciation in the advanced stage of their lives, after getting retirement from the jobs or by handing over business to their heirs. Their renunciation is in any way not related to celibacy, because almost all of them get married.

Mahdavi community centers are known as Da'iras. Mahdavis engaged in extensive missionary activity.

Mohammad Jaunpuri declared himself to be the Mahdi, and a "Caliph of Allah". He claimed to teach the true inner meaning of the Qur'an and strictly adhere to the Sunnah of Muhammad. Jaunpuri's declaration was ignored by the Ulema of Mecca, but after he repeated his declaration in Ahmedabad, Gujarat, he gained a group of followers and established a line of caliphs who led the movement after his death.

== History ==
After Jaunpuri's demise in 1505, the Mahdavi movement went through a militant phase, lasting during the reign of the first five Mahdavi caliphs. The movement was persecuted under the Sultan Muzaffar Shah II (r. 1511–1526) of Gujarat Sultanate.

The second Mahdavi caliph, Bandagi Miyan Syed Khundmir and his Fukhra disciples (the persons who renounce the world and keep remembering Allah with Zikr), faced organised persecution by the regime of Muzaffar at the behest of his court-appointed Mullas and was killed in 1523 along with hundreds of unarmed and peaceful disciples. Syed Khundmir's tomb is located in the town of Champaner in the Panchmahal district of the western Indian state Gujarat, where thousands of seekers and followers, from different parts of India and other countries, arrive to pay tribute.

After the 1799 siege of Seringapatam, the British government invited the Mahdavis to re-settle in Mysore.

== Community ==
Anjuman-e-Mahdavia is a Mahdavia community center in Hyderabad, Telangana, India, established in 1902. L. K. A. Iyer in 1930 reports the existence of a community of "Mahdavia Musalmans" in Mysore Donabaghatta, Channapatna, Kirugavalu. There is a village named Donabaghatta in Karnataka. Large groups of Mahdavis resided in Gujarat, Rajasthan, Maharashtra, Tamil Nadu, Karnataka-Bengaluru, etc. The 1962 Gazette of Karnataka State has recorded the Mahadavia Sect of Islam in the state. Mahdavis of Gujarat state mostly lives in Tai Wada area in Vadodara district along with majority Sunni Muslims. They also have a small presence in Bharuch.

A Mahdavi center in north Chicago at (N Western Ave) was established by a group of South Asian immigrants in January 2016.

== See also ==
=== Others who claimed to be Mahdi ===
- Ahmed ibn Abi Mahalli
- Ibn Tumart
- Mirza Ghulam Ahmad
- Muhammad Ahmad
- Siyyid `Alí Muḥammad Shírází
