= Tomb of Salabat Khan II =

Tomb in Ahmednagar district, Maharashtra

Coordinates: 19.094°N 74.840°E

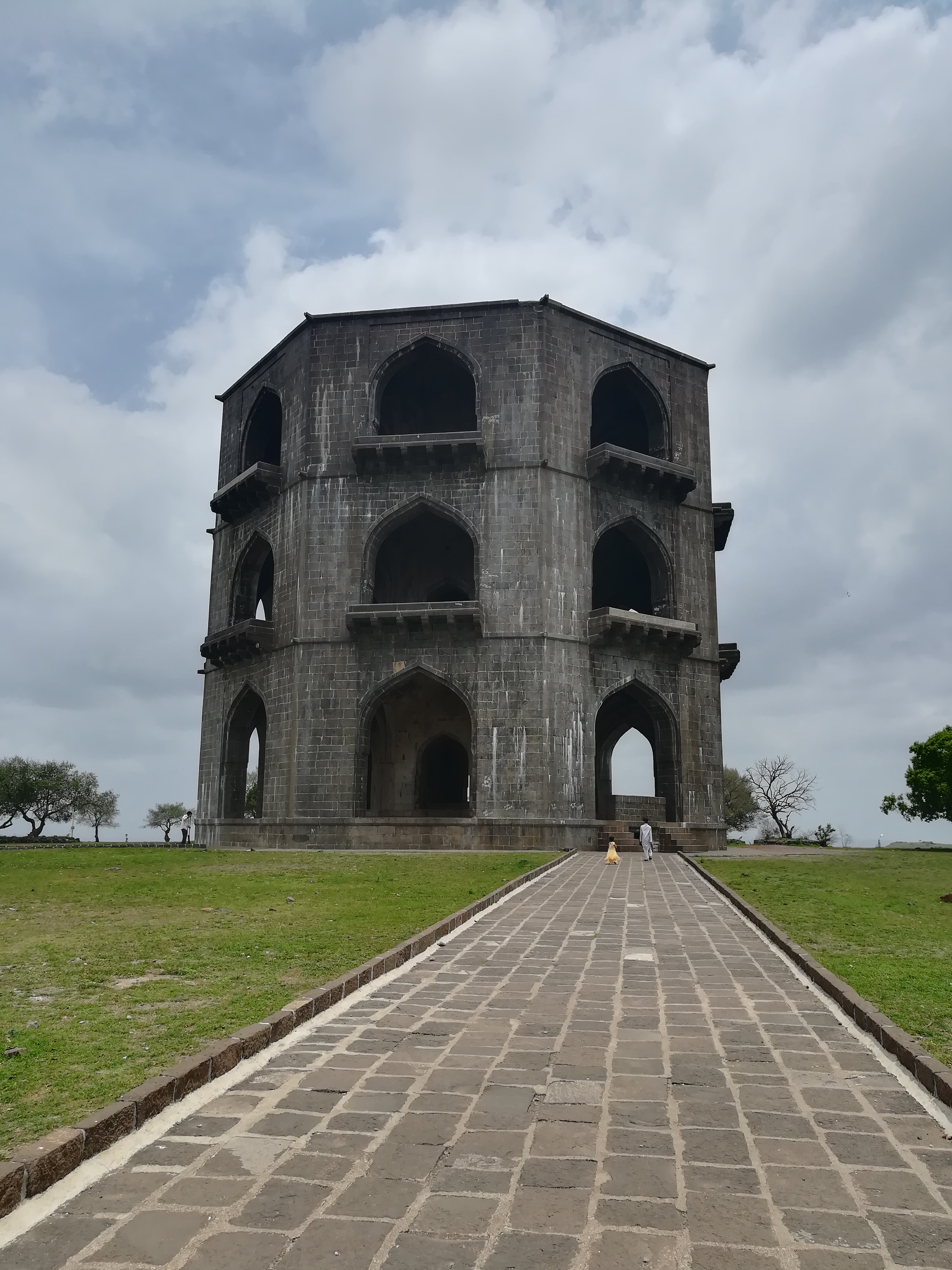
Tomb Of Salabat Khan II

The Tomb of Salabat Khan II is also commonly but mistakenly known as Chandbiwi's Mahel, Chand Bibi Palace or similar variations. It is a three-storey stone structure situated on the crest of a hill, 13 km from Ahmednagar city in the state of Maharashtra, India,

The tomb is about 3080 feet above sea level on the top of a hill, 700–800 feet above the city, offering good views of the surrounding landscape and visible from almost anywhere in the city.

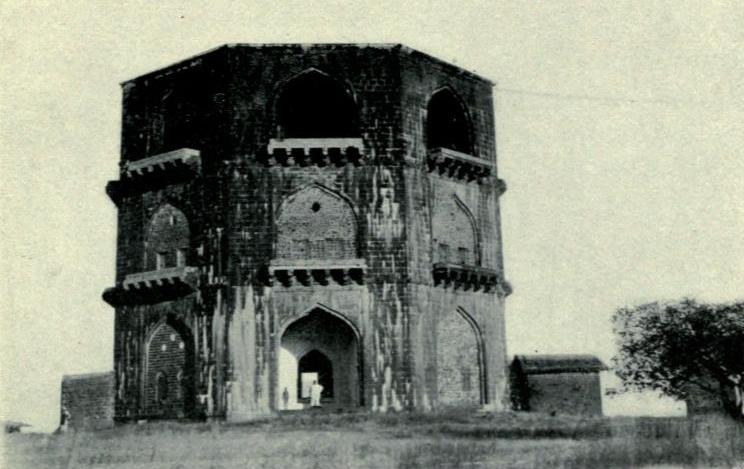
View around 1920

It is believed that the structure was planned to be seven-storey but only three were built. The building is plain and having eight sided platform. By the simple contrivance of a stone terrace built about twelve feet high and 100 yards broad, the tomb seems to rise with considerable dignity from the centre of an octagon. The tomb has angular holes so has been given that rise so during sunset, sun light falls on it.

== Architecture and design ==
The two tombs one of Salabat Khan and one of his wives -are covered by a dome supported on three piers of elegant pointed arches. On its octagonal plan the monument rises like a tower from a twelve foot wide base to a height of seventy feet and there projects from its interior face a continuous gallery twelve feet broad all round. Access to the gallery is provided by a narrow staircase which is hidden in the wall. Though very little of ornament is associated with it the three architectural features which distinguish this monument—namely, the octagon platform, the piers of pointed arches and its gallery entitle it to a place of honour among the Islamic monuments of Ahmadnagar.

The tomb of Salabat khan and his wife rest in an octagonal basement. Above rises a three storey octagon, some 23 metres high. Each side is marked by tiers of broad arched openings, the other two with projecting balconies on lotus brackets. The double-height octagonal chamber is surrounded by domed bays on eight sides. The austere but impressive tomb stands on a spacious hilltop terrace, commanding views across the plain to Ahmadnagar 10 kilometres to the west.

== Salabat Khan II ==
Salabat Khan II, was a minister of the fourth Nizam shah, Murtaza who ascended the throne in 1565. A great statesman, Salabat Khan was appointed minister in 1579, after the half-mad Murtaza put to death his regent, Changiz Khan, in a fit of suspicion and rage.

== Chand Bibi ==
Chand Bibi (1550–1599 CE) was an Indian Muslim woman warrior who acted as the Regent of Ahmednagar (1596–99) during her son Murtazi's minority. She is best known for defending Ahmednagar against the Mughal forces of Emperor Akbar. She was ultimately killed by an enraged mob of her own troops.

== See also ==
- Salabat Khan
