= Donabaghatta =

- Village
- Location in Karnataka, India Donabaghatta (India)
- Coordinates: 13.8951300°N 75.7015500°E
- Country: India
- State: Karnataka
- District: Shimoga
- Taluk: Bhadravathi

Government
  - Body: Grama Panchayath

Area
  - Total: 4.4256 km^{2} (1.7087 sq mi)
- Elevation: 600 m (2,000 ft)

Population (2011)
  - Total: 8,290
  - Density: 1,870/km^{2} (4,850/sq mi)

Languages
  - Official: Kannada
- Time zone: UTC+5:30 (IST)
- PIN: 577229
- Vehicle registration: KA-14

Donabaghatta is a village in the southern state of Karnataka, India. It is located in the Bhadravati taluk of Shimoga district in Karnataka. As per census 2011, the location code number of the village is 608620.

It is 7 km from Bhadravathi and 19 km from Shimoga city.

== See also ==
- Shimoga
- Districts of Karnataka
