= Vidarbha Vikas Party =

Political party in Maharashtra, India

Vidarbha Vikas Party (Vidarba Development Party) is a political party in the Indian state of Maharashtra. It is an 'registered un-recognised' political parties as per the 2024-2025 list of the Election Commission of India.

VVP aims to work for the formation of a separate Vidarbha state in eastern Maharashtra.
