= Battle of Talikota =

1565 battle in India

- Part of Muslim conquest in the Indian subcontinent
| Date | 23 January 1565 |
| Location | Around the Villages of Rakshāsi and Tengadi near Talikota in present day Karnataka |
| Result | Deccan Sultanates alliance victory: Sacking of Vijayanagara; Complete decline of the Vijayanagara Empire |

Belligerents
| Deccan sultanates: Ahmadnagar Sultanate; Bijapur Sultanate; Golkonda Sultanate; Bidar Sultanate; Berar Sultanate | Vijayanagara Empire |

Commanders and leaders
| Hussain Nizam Shah I; Ali Adil Shah I; Ibrahim Quli Qutb Shah Wali; Ali Barid Shah I; Burhan Imad Shah | Aliya Rama Raya (executed); Venkatadri †; Tirumala Deva Raya; Achutappa Nayak; Noor Khan Gilani; Bijli Khan Gilani |

The Battle of Talikota, also known as that of Rakshasi-Tangadi, (23 January 1565) was a watershed battle fought between the Vijayanagara Empire and an alliance of the Deccan sultanates. The battle resulted in the defeat of Aliya Rama Raya which led to the eventual collapse of the polity and reconfigured Deccan politics.

The specific details of the battle and its immediate aftermath are notoriously difficult to reconstruct in light of the distinctly contrarian narratives present across primary sources. Defeat is usually blamed on the gap in relative military prowess. Orientalist and nationalist historians asserted of the battle to be a clash of civilizations between Hindus and Muslims; Contemporary scholars reject such characterizations as flawed.

== Background ==
Rama Raya, after his installation of a patrimonial state and emerging as the ruler, adopted a political strategy of benefiting from the internecine warfare among the multiple successors of the Bahmani Sultanate, and it worked well for about twenty years of his reign.

However, after a series of aggressive efforts to maintain hold over Kalyan (Note: Kalyana was the capital of the Chalukyas. Rama Raya sought to control the territory in his bid to gain popular legitimacy by establishing himself as the true heir to Chalukya sovereignty and glory. Other examples included retrofitting of decayed Chalukya complexes and bringing back Chalukya festivals.) and diplomatic dealings with the Sultanates laden with insulting gestures, the four Muslim Sultanates – Hussain Nizam Shah I and Ali Adil Shah I of Ahmadnagar and Bijapur to the west, Ali Barid Shah I of Bidar in the center, and Ibrahim Quli Qutb Shah Wali of Golkonda to the east – united in the wake of shrewd marital diplomacy and convened to attack Aliya Rama Raya, in late January 1565.

== Battle ==
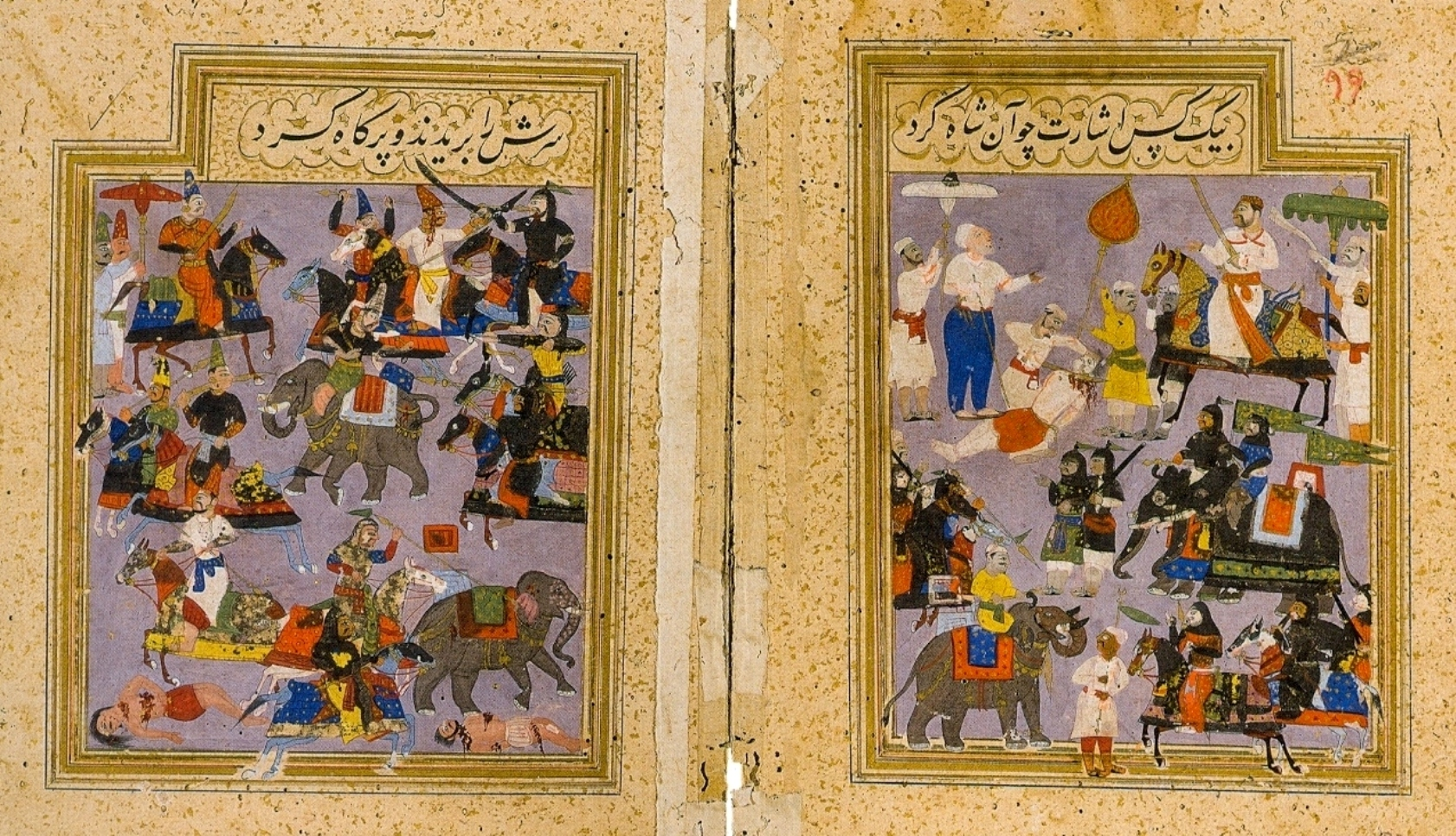
Battle of Talikota.

=== Sources ===
There exist multiple contemporary chronicles (literary as well as historical) documenting the battle:

- Burhan-i Maasir by Sayyid Ali Bin Abdullah Tabataba, the court historian of Ahmadnagar Sultanate.
- Gulshan-i Ibrahimi by Ferishta, the court historian of Bijapur Sultanate.
- Taḏkerat al-molūk by Rafi-ud-Din Shirazi, another court historian of Bijapur Sultanate.
- Décadas da Ásia by official Portuguese record-keeper Diogo do Couto.
- Letters by Goa governor Dom Antão de Noronha.
- Fath-Nama-i Nizam Shah by Hasan Shauqi, a Dakhni poet.
- Tarif-i Husayn Shah by Aftabi, a poet at Ahmadnagar court.

The details of the battle and immediate aftermath are often distinctly contrarian and even accounting for biases, reconstruction is difficult, if not impossible.

=== Description ===
The exact venue of clash has been variously mentioned as Talikota, Rakkasagi-Tangadigi and Banahatti, all on the banks of river Krishna. (Note: James Campbell had reported traces of the Vijayanagara defensive fortifications along the southern bank of Krishna in these regions as late as 1884.) There exists debate as to the precise dates. Span-lengths vary from hours to days; descriptions of battle formations and maneuvers vary too. Muslims from the Vijayanagar army under the Muslim generals (Gilani brothers) defected to the opposite side during the battle, causing the Vijayanagar army to lose. The superior, well integrated tactics of the Sultanates' artillery also led to their victory.

=== Outcome ===
Rama Raya was eventually beheaded either by Sultan Nizam Hussain himself or by someone else acting on his behest despite Adil Shah, who had friendly relations with Raya, intending against. In the resultant confusion and havoc, Raya's brother Tirumala deserted with the entire army; he did try to regroup in Vijaynagara but failed and moved to the outskirts. His other brother Venkatadri was blinded and likely, killed in action.

== Aftermath ==
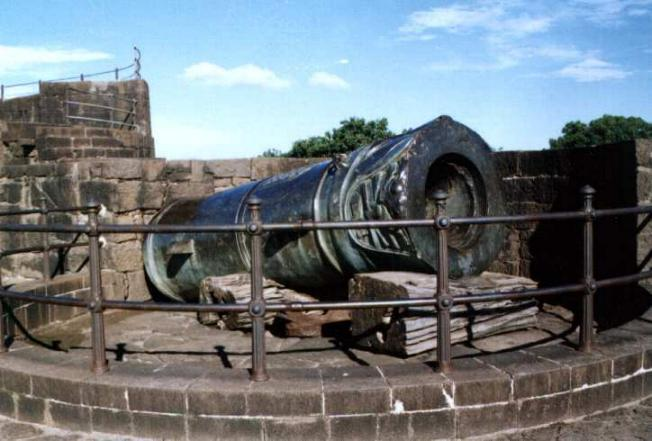
The "Malik-i-Maidan" (Master of the Battlefield) cannon, stated to be the largest piece of cast bronze ordnance in the world, was utilized by the Deccan Sultanates during the Battle of Talikota. It was provided by Ali Adil Shah I (Bijapur Sultanate)

The Sultanates' armies went on to plunder Vijayanagara, unopposed. Popular accounts and older scholarship describe Vijayanagara falling to ruins, in light of the widespread desecration of sacred topography; Bahamani Sultan camped in Vijayanagar for six months, post war. Every single house, temple, building and habitation in a radius spanning twenty leagues was burned down. Vijayanagar was reduced to rubble, which even now is called by kannada monicker "Halu Hampi" (Ruined Hampi).

However, this view has been contested. Contemporary historians and archaeologists warn against conflating the state with the town as little evidence exists about any damage inflicted beyond the Royal Center; they further emphasize about the politically strategic nature of destruction and arson, since sites associated with sovereignty, royal power, and authority were subject to more wanton means.

Nonetheless, the battle caused a political rupture for the state of Vijayanagara and permanently reconfigured Deccan politics. Patronage of monuments and temples ceased, the Vaishnava cult perished, and the Royal Center was never rebuilt. The Bijapur Sultanate reaped maximum gains but their alliance did not last long. Tirumala went on to establish the Aravidu dynasty, which held sway over fragments of the erstwhile empire and even operated out of Vijayanagara for two years, before shifting to Pengonda. But faced with successional disputes, rebellions by multiple local chieftains—primarily Telugu Nayak houses—who did not wish for the reemergence of any central authority, (Note: Stein notes of these independent estates to have been consolidating power since the zenith of Rama Raya's rule. He considers the entire span of Vijayanagara Empire to be a weakly-centralised polity, whose most important territories were regarded by local chiefs as independent "in every respect save that they could not claim to be fully-fledged kingdoms". Noboru Karashima disagrees with Stein's broad characterization but agrees that the final period of the Vijayanagar empire (Aravidus) was indeed marked by the growing power of the Nayakas as local feudal lords.) and continuous conflicts with the Bijapur Sultanate—who might have been invited by Rama Raya's son—, it moved southwards before disintegrating in the late 1640s.

== Legacy ==
=== Analysis of defeat ===
Vijayanagara side was winning the war, state Hermann Kulke and Dietmar Rothermund in a survey of Indian history, until two Muslim generals of the Vijayanagara army switched sides. Many scholars however reject this account of treachery as a post-battle speculation by Venetian merchant Cesare de Federici in Viaggi, which would be taken up by a section of nationalist historians in their quest to identify traitors upon whom the responsibility of any and all Hindu defeats can be entrusted; a gulf of difference in military prowess—primarily stemming from a failure to incorporate gunpowder technology—is instead noted as the primary factor.

=== Clash of civilizations ===
Colonial era historians (Robert Sewell, Jonathan Scott et al) drawing from the accounts of Firishta and later, nationalist historians (Aluru Venkata Rao, B. A. Saletore, S. Krishnaswami Aiyangar, K. A. Nilakanta Sastri et al) lensed the battle as a Clash of Civilizations wherein the "Ramrajya" of Vijayanagara, a "Hindu bulwark" state fell to "Muhammedan" conquests driven by religious bigotry.

Richard M. Eaton rejects that there were any religious motives behind the battle and described of the civilization-hypothesis as orientalist scholarship, which ignored the multiple alliances of Rama Raya with different Muslim rulers at different spans of time (in tune to his political strategy), the thorough perfusion of Persian Islamate culture with Vijaynagara Kingdom, as evident from court-sanctioned art, architecture and culture, and strategic alliances of Rama Raya's heirs (Aravidus) with heirs of the Deccan Sultans. Romila Thapar, Burton Stein, Sanjay Subrahmanyam, Muzaffar Alam, Stewart N. Gordon and other scholars agree on the basis of similar analyses; additional arguments include that the Berar Sultanate did not join the battle and that the Sultanate-alliance dissipated soon enough. Harmonious Hindu-Muslim relations in the empire has been documented and there were high placed Muslims in Vijaynagara Court.

=== Popular culture ===
The battle has been adopted into a play named 'Crossing to Talikota' by Girish Karnad, who based it on Eaton's analysis.

== See also ==
- War of the League of the Indies
