= Ahmadnagar Sultanate =

Deccan Indian kingdom (1490–1636)

Ahmadnagar Sultanate سلسله نظام شاهیان
- 1490–1636
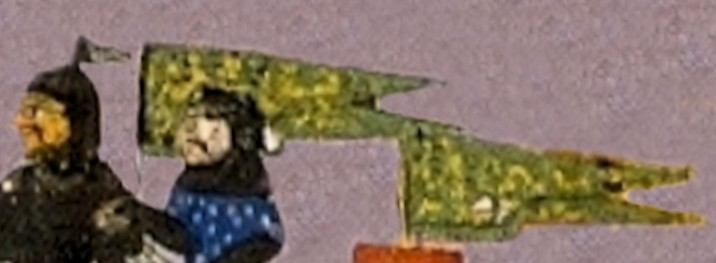
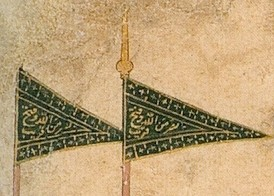
- Flag of the Ahmadnagar Sultanate (Note: Flags of Ahmadnagar from the Battle of Talikota from the Ta'rif-i Husain Shahi (Chronicle of Husain Shah): ) (Note: Flags of Ahmadnagar from the drawing, Sultan Husain Nizam Shah I on Horseback: )

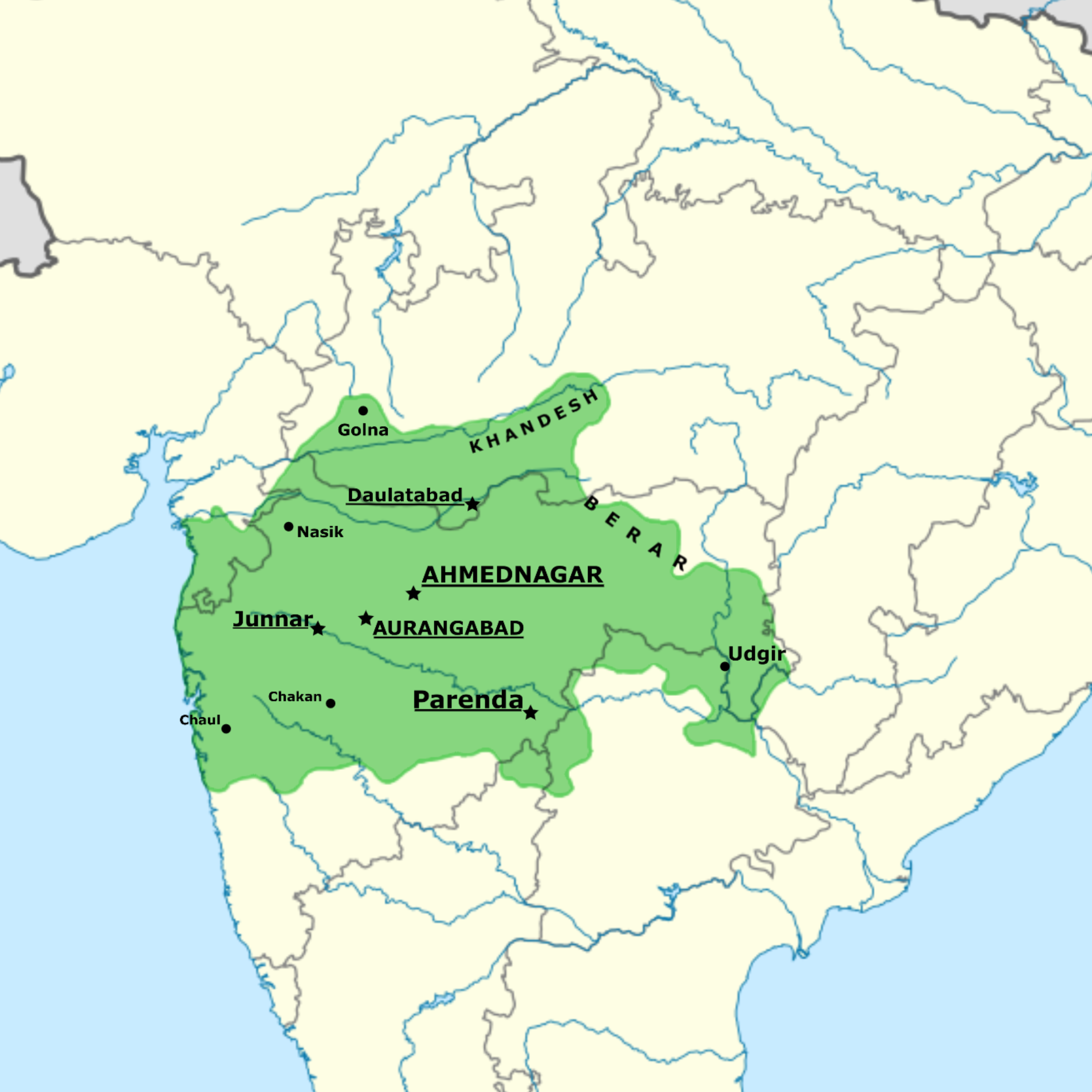
- Map of Ahmadnagar Sultanate extending form Khandesh to Udgir, Golna to Paranda and from Konkan to territories beyond Elichpur of Berar.
- Capital: Junnar (1490–1494; 1610); Ahmednagar (1494–1600); Daulatabad (1499–1636, secondary capital); Paranda (1600–1610); Aurangabad (1610–1636)
- Official languages: Persian
- Common languages: Marathi; Deccani Urdu (language of the ruling class)
- Religion: State religion: Sunni Islam (until 1538); Shi'a Islam (1538 onwards); Mahdavism (1589–1591); Other: Other religions in South Asia
- Government: Monarchy
- Sultan
  - 1490–1510: Ahmad Nizam Shah I (first)
  - 1633–1636: Murtaza Nizam Shah III (last)
- History
  - Established: 28 May 1490
  - Disestablished: October 1636
- Currency: Falus
Preceded by	Succeeded by
Bahmani Sultanate	Mughal Empire; Bijapur Sultanate
- Today part of: India

The Ahmadnagar Sultanate was an early modern sultanate located in the northwestern Deccan, ruled by the Nizam Shahi dynasty. (Note: Persian: سلسله نظام شاهیان, romanized: Silsila-yi Niẓām Šāhiyān) One of the five Deccan sultanates, it was established by Ahmad Nizam Shah I in 1490; Nizam Shah I was the son of Malik Hasan Bahri who was of Kulkarni origin from Pathri in Marathwada.

After serving as governor of Beed and other districts, Malik Ahmad declared independence from the Bahmani Sultanate and established Ahmadnagar Sultanate. Initially the capital was in the town of Junnar with its fort, later renamed Shivneri. In 1494, the foundation was laid for the new capital Ahmednagar. A land fort called Ahmednagar Fort was the headquarters of the Ahmednagar Sultanate. It was situated between the sultanates of Gujarat and Bijapur.

After Malik Ahmad died in 1510, his young son Burhan Nizam Shah I became ruler, converting to Nizari Isma'ili Shi'a Islam. The dynasty played a major role in the Deccan region, including forming an alliance of Muslim sultanates that defeated the Vijayanagara Empire at the Battle of Talikota in 1565, where Sultan Hussain Nizam Shah I personally beheaded Rama Raya, the Vijayanagara regent. Subsequent rulers included Murtaza Nizam Shah I, who expanded the kingdom to its largest size and repelled a Mughal invasion in 1586. Internal strife and assassinations marked later reigns, with regents like Chand Bibi and Malik Ambar defending the sultanate from Mughal attacks until Ahmadnagar was eventually conquered. In 1636 Aurangzeb, then Mughal viceroy of the Deccan, annexed the sultanate to the Mughal Empire. The Ahmadnagar Sultanate was notable for its cultural contributions, including the earliest Deccan school of painting and extensive architectural works such as palaces (Farah Bakhsh Bagh, Hasht Bihisht Bagh), forts (Junnar/Shivneri, Daulatabad), mosques, and tombs. The capital city Ahmadnagar was modelled after major Persianate cities and was considered highly impressive in its time. Malik Ambar is credited with building the Janjira Fort, which played a strategic role in regional defence.

== History ==
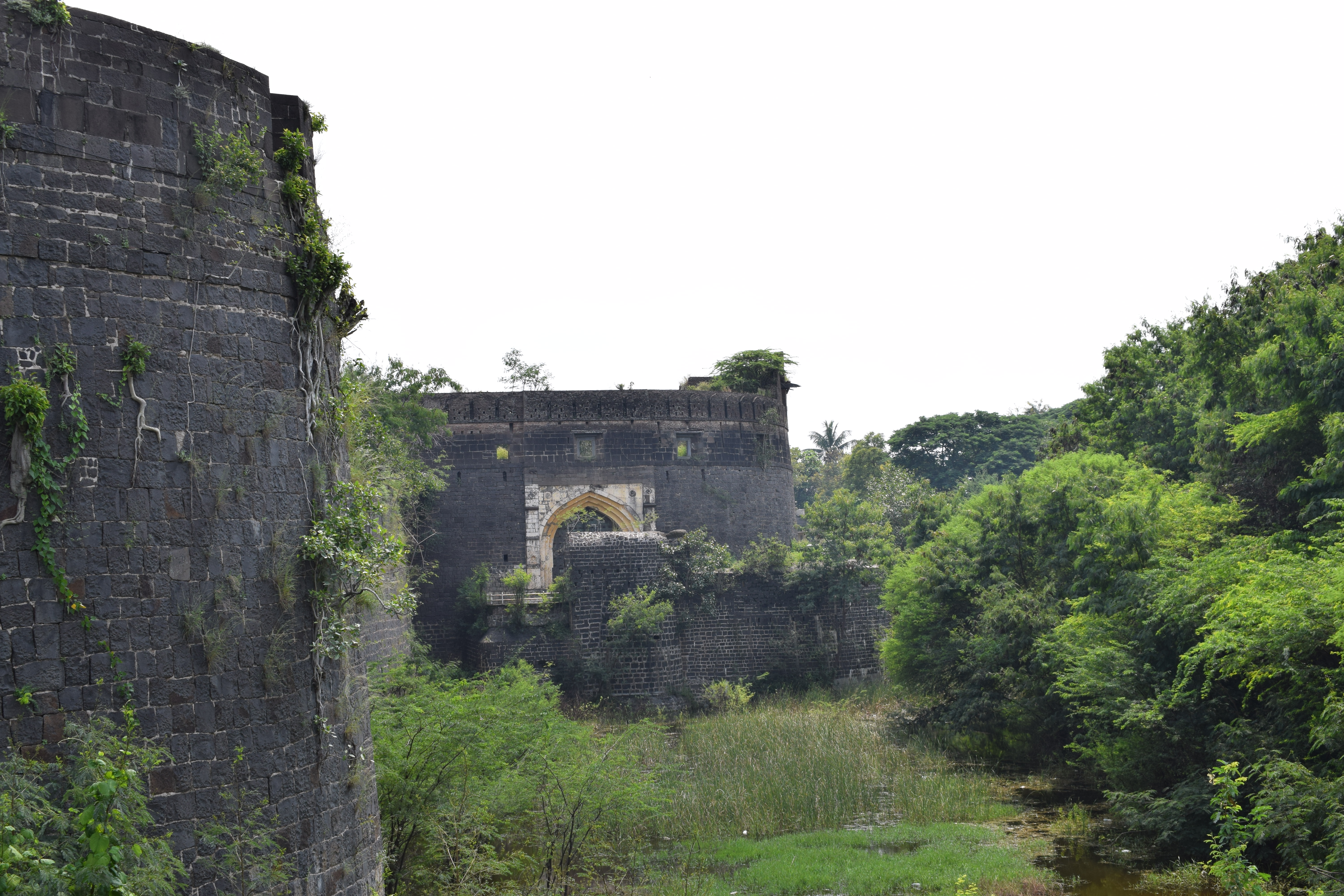
Ahmednagar Fort

=== Establishment ===
Malik Ahmad Nizam Shah I who was the son of Nizam-ul-Mulk Malik Hasan Bahri established the kingdom. His Family were the Brahmin Kulkarnis of Pathri, a town in Marathwada. Either as a result of religious persecution or famine, his ancestors came to Vijayanagar Empire. Ahmed's father was made prime minister on the death of Mahmud Gawan and was made Malik Na'ib by Mahmood Shah Bahmani II. Soon after, he appointed Ahmed governor of Beed and other districts in the vicinity of Dowlutabad. After the death of his father, Ahmed assumed the title of Nizam ul-Mulk Bahri from his father, the latter signifying a falcon, as Hasan had been a falconer to the Sultan. Malik Ahmad the Bahmani governor of Junnar defended his province against incursions from the Sultan and his forces, successfully defeating a much larger army led by Sheikh Muaddi Arab in a night attack, an army of 18,000 led by Azmut-ul-Dabir and an army led by Bahmani general Jahangir Khan. On 28 May 1490, Ahmad declared independence and established the Nizam Shahi dynasty's rule over a de facto independent Sultanate. Initially, his capital was in the town of Junnar with its fort, later renamed Shivneri. In 1494, the foundation was laid for the new capital Ahmadnagar. After several attempts, he secured the great fortress of Daulatabad in 1499.

=== Reigns of the successors of Malik Ahmad ===
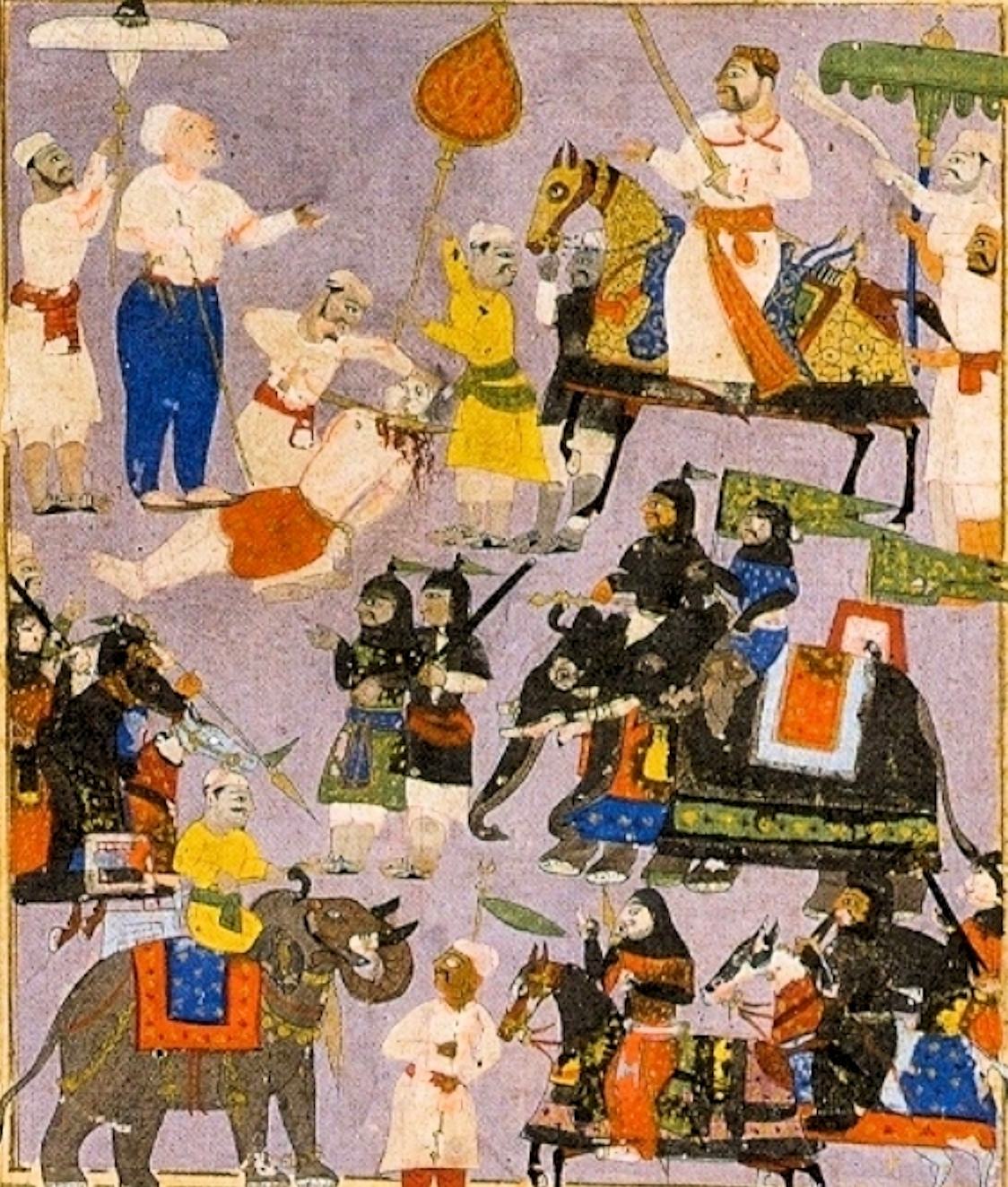
Rama Raya's beheading in the Battle of Talikota in 1565

After the death of Malik Ahmad in 1510, his son Burhan Nizam Shah I, a boy of seven, was installed on the throne. In the initial days of his reign, the control of the kingdom was in the hands of Mukammal Khan, an Ahmadnagar official and his son. Burhan converted to Nizari Isma'ili Shi'a Islam under the tutelage of Shah Tahir, a refugee from Persia and court official who was head of the largest branch of Nizari Shi'ism at that time. Burhan died in Ahmadnagar in 1553. He left six sons, of whom Hussain Nizam Shah I succeeded him.

Beginning in the 1560s, the de facto ruler of nearby Vijayanagara Empire, Rama Raya, made a series of aggressive efforts to maintain hold over Kalyan (Note: Kalyana was the capital of the Chalukyas. Rama Raya sought to control the territory in his bid to gain popular legitimacy by establishing himself as the true heir to Chalukya sovereignty and glory. Other examples included the retrofitting of decayed Chalukya complexes and bringing back Chalukya festivals.) and conducting diplomatic dealings with the Sultanates laden with insulting gestures. In response, four of the five Deccan Muslim sultans—namely Hussain Nizam Shah I and Ali Adil Shah I of Ahmadnagar and Bijapur to the west, Ali Barid Shah I of Bidar in the center, and Ibrahim Quli Qutb Shah Wali of Golconda to the east—united in the wake of shrewd marital diplomacy and convened to attack Rama Raya in late January 1565 at Talikota. Hussain was a leading figurehead of the Deccan sultanates during the ensuing battle. Afterwards, Rama Raya was beheaded by Sultan Nizam Hussain himself.

After the death of Hussain in 1565, his minor son Murtaza Nizam Shah I ascended the throne. During his minority, his mother Khanzada Humayun ruled as a regent for several years. Murtaza Shah annexed Berar in 1574, bringing the sultanate to its territorial zenith. Murtaza launched an unsuccessful campaign into Bijapur in 1580, following the death of sultan Ali Adil Shah I earlier that year. In 1586, Ahmadnagar faced an invasion by Akbar of the Mughal Empire; Mughal forces approached the capital, but were dispelled, choosing to withdraw to the recently annexed Ellichpur, whereupon the city was sacked and razed. The Mughals were then fully expelled from Ahmadnagar territory, the invasion ultimately ending in Mughal humiliation. Amid falling stability in the Sultanate as a result of mismanaged factional relations, Murtaza was murdered by his son Miran Hussain in 1588, who succeeded him and ascended the throne. His reign could, however, last only a little more than ten months, as he was imprisoned. Ismail, a cousin of Miran Hussain, was raised to the throne, but actual power was in the hands of Jamal Khan, the leader of the Habshi group in the court. He was the leader of the Mahdawi movement, and aggressively propagated the faith while in power.

Ismail Nizam Shah's unpopular reign proved short. Jamal Khan was killed in the Battle of Rohankhed in 1591, and soon Ismail was also captured and confined by his father, Burhan, who ascended the throne as Burhan Nizam Shah II. He outlawed Mahdawia and reinstated Shi'ism as the state religion. Following Burhan's death, a civil war broke out, which was eventually won by his sister, Chand Bibi. She ascended the throne as regent for the new infant sultan and her grand-nephew, Bahadur Nizam Shah, then repelled an invasion by the Mughal Empire with reinforcements from the Bijapur and Golconda Sultanates. After the death of Chand Bibi in July 1600, Ahmadnagar was conquered by the Mughals and the Sultan was imprisoned.

=== Malik Ambar and the demise of the sultanate ===
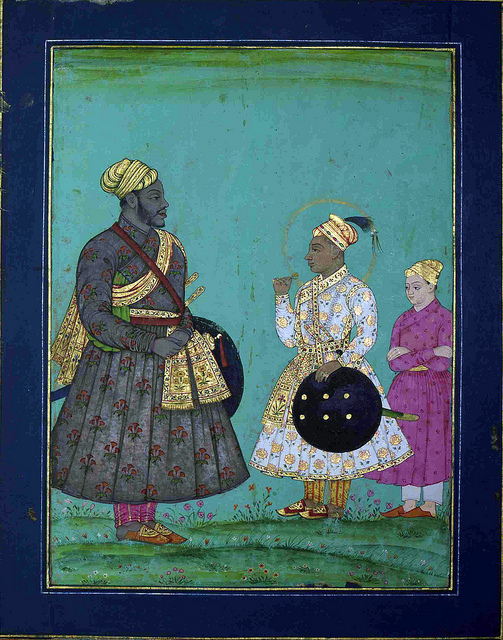
Murtaza Nizam Shah II with Malik Ambar

Despite Ahmadnagar city being incorporated into the Mughal Empire, much of the former kingdom still remained in the possession of influential officials of the Nizam Shahi dynasty. Malik Ambar and other Ahmadnagar officials defied the Mughals and declared Murtaza Nizam Shah II as sultan in 1600 at a new capital in Paranda. Malik Ambar became prime minister and vekīl-us-saltanat of Ahmadnagar. Later, the capital was shifted, first to Junnar and Ausa and then to a new city called Khadki (later Aurangabad).

After the death of Malik Ambar in May 1626, his son Fath Khan surrendered to the Mughals in the siege of Daulatabad in 1633 and handed over the young Nizam Shahi ruler Hussain Shah, who was sent as a prisoner to the fort of Gwalior. But soon, Shahaji, a jagirdar and general of the sultanate at that time, with the assistance of Bijapur, placed an infant scion of the Nizam Shahi dynasty, Murtaza Nizam Shah III on the throne, and he became the regent of the sultanate. In 1636, Aurangzeb, then Mughal viceroy of the Deccan, finally defeated Shahaji and partitioned the sultanate between the Mughal Empire and the Sultanate of Bijapur.

=== Revenue system of Malik Ambar ===
The revenue system introduced by Malik Ambar was based on the revenue system introduced in Northern India and some parts of Gujarat and Khandesh subahs by Raja Todarmal. Lands were classified as good or bad according to their fertility, and it took a number of years to ascertain the average yield of lands accurately. He abolished the revenue farming. At first, revenue was fixed as two-fifths of the actual produce in kind, but later the cultivators were allowed to pay in cash equivalent to approximately one-third of the yield. Although an average rent was fixed for each plot of land, actual collections depended on the conditions of crops, and they varied from year to year.

== Culture ==
=== Art ===
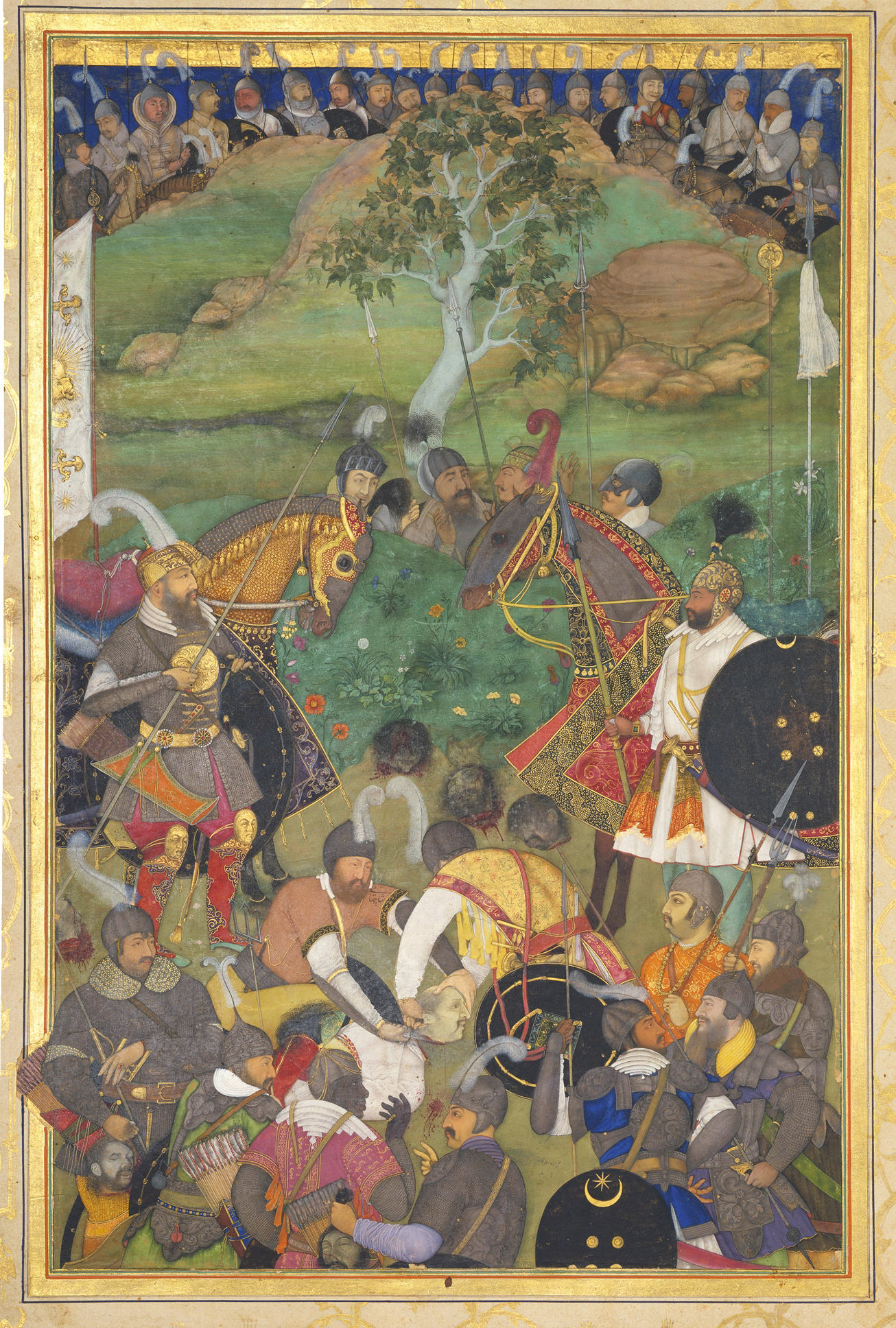
The treacherous Mughal Viceroy of the Deccan Khan Jahan Lodi was executed in the year 1630, for covertly allying himself with Burhan Nizam Shah III, against the Mughal Emperor Shah Jahan.

Under the reigns of successive rulers of the dynasty, architecture and art flourished in the kingdom. The earliest extant school of painting in the Deccan sultanates is from Ahmadnagar. Several palaces, such as the Farah Bakhsh Bagh, The Hasht Bihisht Bagh and Lakkad Mahal were built, as were tombs, mosques and other buildings. Many forts of the Deccan, such as the fort of Junnar (later renamed Shivneri), Paranda, Ausa, Dharur, Lohagad, etc., were greatly improved under their reign. Daulatabad, which was their secondary capital, was also heavily fortified and constructed during their reign. Literature was heavily patronised in the kingdom, as seen through manuscripts such as the Tarif-i Husain Shah Badshah-i Dakan. Sanskrit scholarship was also given a boost under their rule, as demonstrated by the works of Sabaji Pratap and Bhanudatta. The city of Ahmadnagar, founded by the Nizam Shahs, was described as being comparable to Cairo and Baghdad, within a few years of its construction. It was modelled along the great cities of the Persianate world, given the Shi'i leanings of the dynasty.

=== Architecture ===
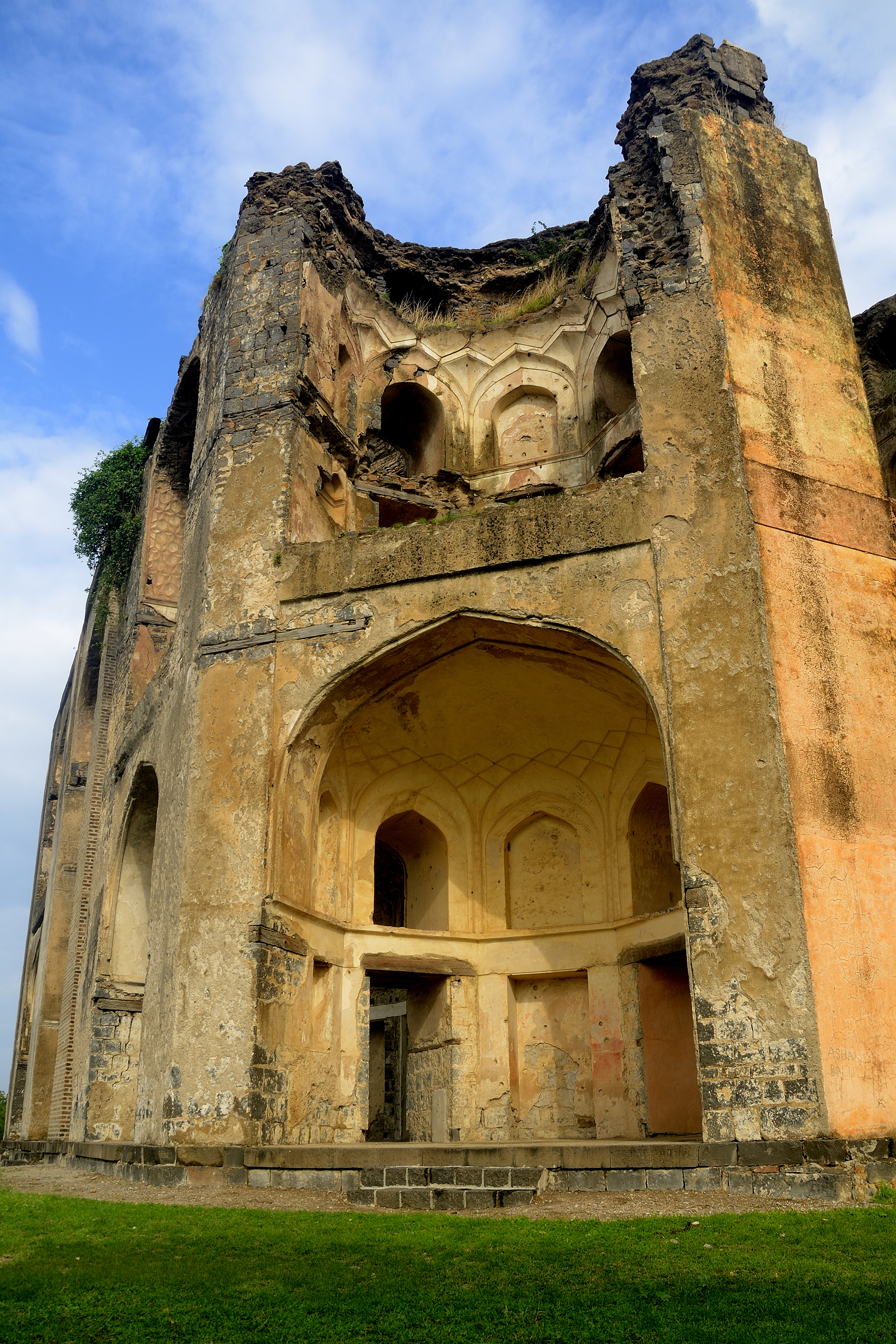
A view of the Farah Bagh built by the Nizam Shahs

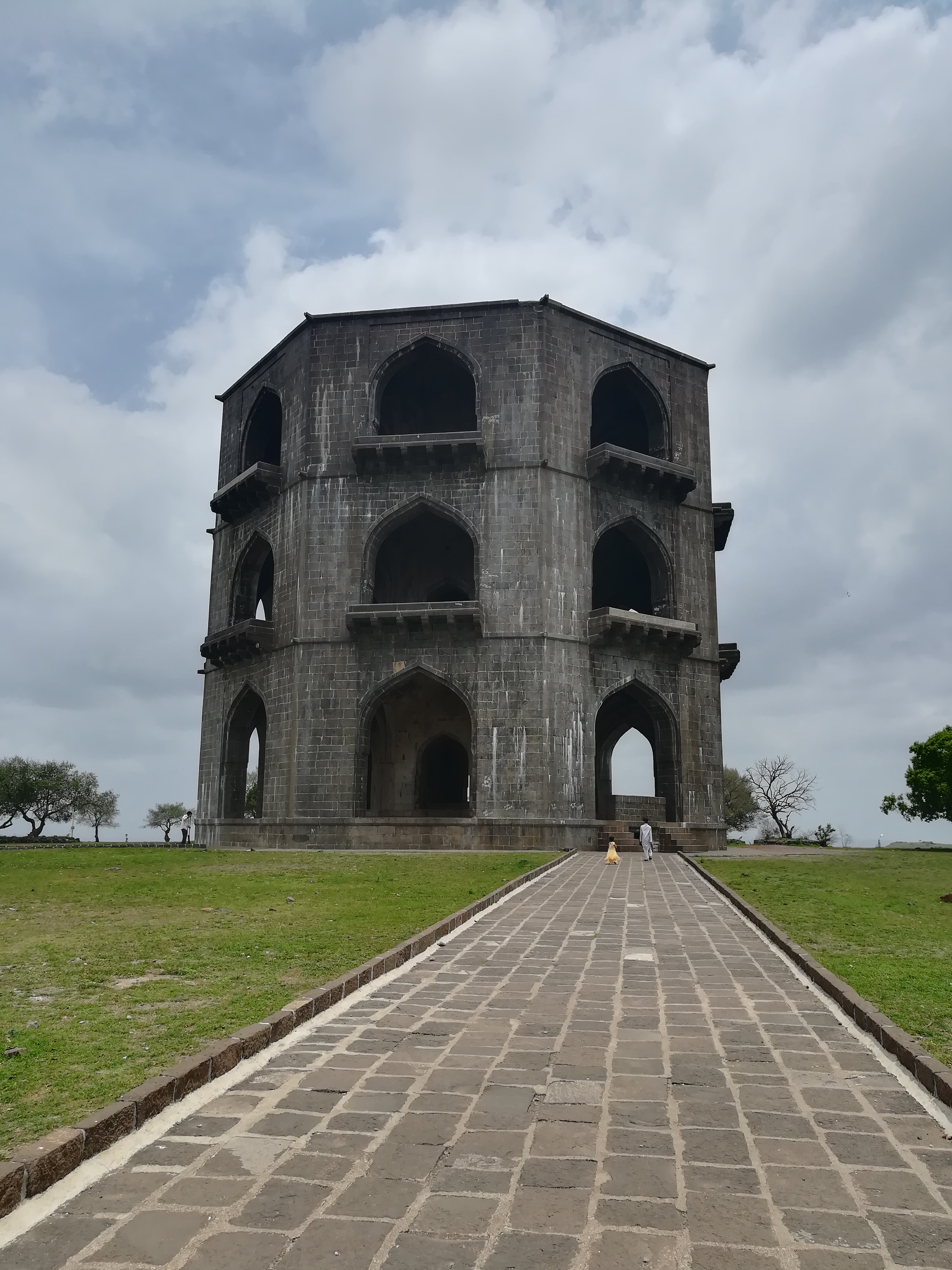
The Tomb Of Salabat Khan II also called Chandbiwi's Mahal after Chand Bibi.

A number of palaces such as the Farah Bakhsh Bagh, Ahmadnagar Fort, Hasht Bihisht Bagh, and Manjarsumbah are in and around Ahmadnagar city. There are tombs of nobles like Salabat Khan and Changiz Khan, and also of saints like Shah Sharif and Bava Bangali.

Malik Ambar is credited with the construction of the Janjira Fort in the Murud Area of present-day Maharashtra India. After its construction in 1567 AD, the fort was key to the Sidis withstanding various invasion attempts by the Marathas, Mughals, and Portuguese to capture Janjira.

Farah Bagh (also called as Faria Bagh) is situated in Ahmednagar, Maharashtra. It is a palace build by Nizam Shahi rulers in Ahmednagar. Farah Bagh was the centrepiece of a huge palatial complex completed in 1583. It was the special possession of the royal household,d and Murtaza Nizam Shah often retired here to play chess with a Delhi singer whom he called Fateh Shah and also built for him a separate mahal called Lakad Mahal in the garden.

== List of rulers ==
The following is the list of the Nizam Shahi rulers of Ahmadnagar:

1. Ahmad Nizam Shah I (1490–1510)
2. Burhan Nizam Shah I (1510–1553)
3. Hussain Nizam Shah I (1553–1565)
4. Murtaza Nizam Shah I (1565–1588)
5. Hussain Nizam Shah II (1588–1589)
6. Ismail Nizam Shah (1589–1591)
7. Burhan Nizam Shah II (1591–1595)
8. Bahadur Nizam Shah (1595–1600; under the regency of his great-aunt Chand Bibi)
9. Ahmad Nizam Shah II (1596)
10. Murtaza Nizam Shah II (1600–1610)
11. Burhan Nizam Shah III (1610–1631)
12. Hussain Nizam Shah III (1631–1633)
13. Murtaza Nizam Shah III (1633–1636).

== Genealogy of House of Nizam-Shahi ==
House of Nizam-Shahi

Ahmadnagar Sultanate

Ahmad I Nizam-Shah r. 1490–1510
Burhan I Nizam-Shah r. 1510–1553
Husayn I Nizam-Shah r. 1553–1565	Shah-Ali
Murtada I Nizam-Shah r. 1565–1588	Burhan II; Nizam-Shah r. 1591–1595	Murtada II; Nizam-Shah r. 1600–1610
Husayn II; Nizam-Shah r. 1588–1589	Isma'il; Nizam-Shah r. 1589–1591	Ibrahim; Nizam-Shah r. 1595–1596	Burhan III; Nizam-Shah r. 1610–1631
Ahmad; Nizam-Shah r. 1596–1596	Bahadur; Nizam-Shah r. 1596–1600	Husayn III; Nizam-Shah r. 1631–1633	Murtada III; Nizam-Shah r. 1633–1636
