= Murtaza Nizam Shah I =

Sultan of Ahmadnagar from 1565 to 1588

4th Sultan of Ahmadnagar
- Reign: 15 July 1565 – 13 June 1588
- Coronation: 26 January 1566
- Predecessor: Hussain Nizam Shah I
- Successor: Hussain Nizam Shah II
- Died: 13 June 1588
- Spouse: Hadiya Sultana (daughter of Ibrahim Adil Shah I); Doordana Begum (dancer)
- Issue: Hussain Nizam Shah II
- House: Nizam Shahi Dynasty
- Father: Hussain Nizam Shah I
- Mother: Khunza Humayun
- Religion: Shia Islam

Murtaza Nizam Shah I (Persian: مرتضی نظام شاه; died 13 June 1588) was the Sultan of Ahmadnagar from 1565 until his execution in 1588. The eldest son of Hussain Nizam Shah I, Murtaza succeeded him in 1565 after his death.

== Reign ==
During the first six years of his rule, his mother Khunza Humayun controlled the affairs of kingdom. Her repeated military failures against her neighbours, including when the kingdom was invaded by Ali Adil Shah in 1569, led the Nizam Shahi nobility to eventually help Murtaza take the reins of administration in his own hands. He retrieved the situation and recovered Udgir from Bijapur. In 1574 he annexed Berar to Ahmednagar; in 1588 he was killed and succeeded by his son Hussain Nizam Shah II. Hussain Nizam Shah II was also murdered after some time.

== See also ==
- Hussain Nizam Shah II
