= Ali Adil Shah I =

Sultan of Bijapur from 1558 to 1580

- Sultan
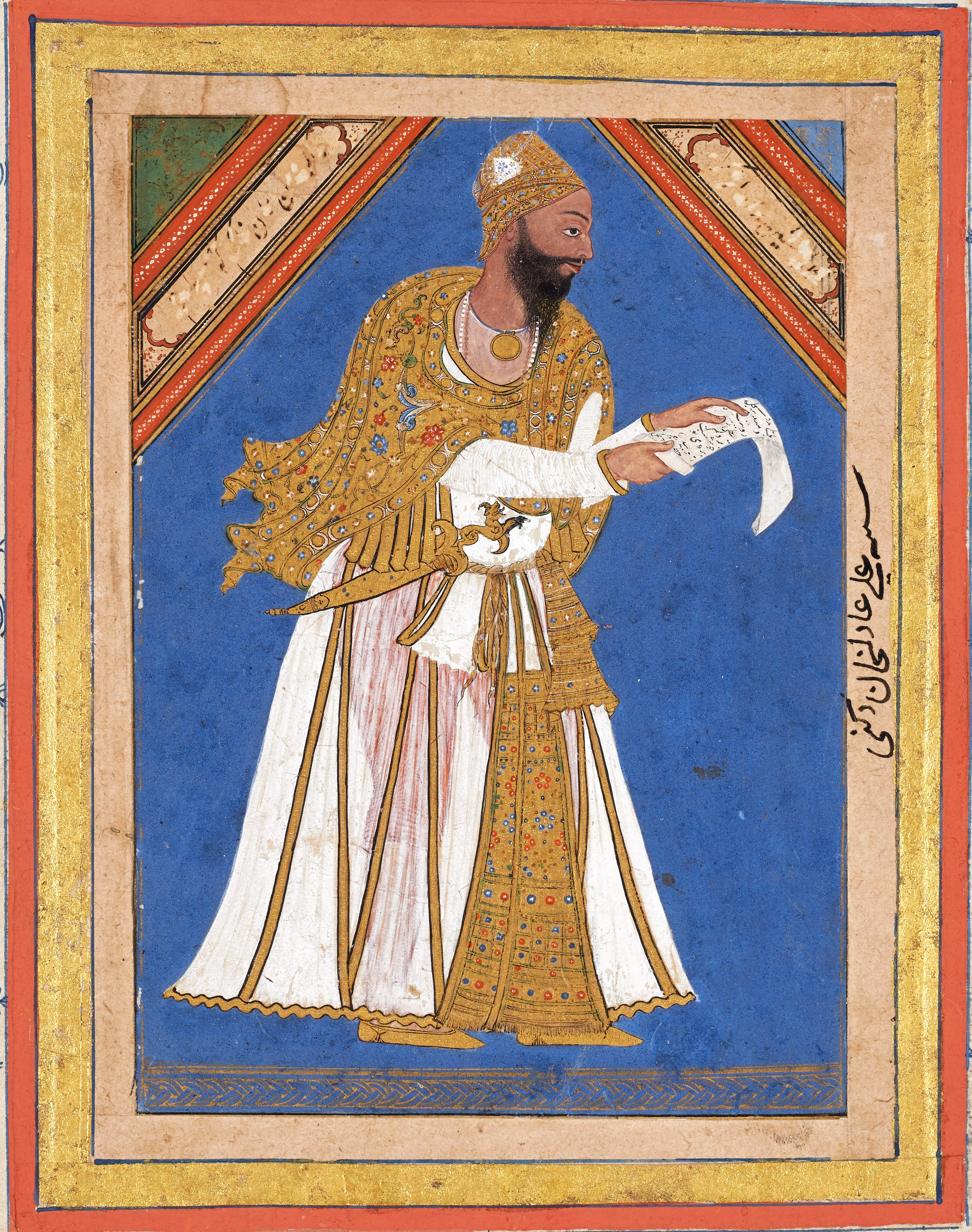

5th Sultan of Bijapur
- Reign: September 1558 – 9 April 1580
- Predecessor: Ibrahim Adil Shah I
- Successor: Ibrahim Adil Shah II
- Died: 9 April 1580; Bijapur
- Burial: Ali Ka Rouza
- Spouse: Chand Bibi
- Issue: Ibrahim Adil Shah II the adopted son.
Names
- Abul Muzaffar Ali Adil Shah
- House: House of Ali
- Dynasty: Adil Shahi Empire
- Father: Ibrahim Adil Shah I
- Mother: Daughter of Asad Khan Lari (Khusrow)
- Religion: Shia Islam prev. Sunni Islam

Ali Adil Shah I (Persian: علی عادل شاه; died 9 April 1580) was the fifth Sultan of the Bijapur Sultanate.

On the day of his coronation Ali abandoned the Sunni practices and reintroduced the Shia Khutbah and other practices. The Persian doctors of religion were granted full freedom to preach the Shi’ah doctrine and were paid by the State for their missionary activities.

The new Sultan restored back to power the Afāqis while relegating the Deccanis to a position of insignificance. He subverted all the dogmatic experiments which his father had practiced.

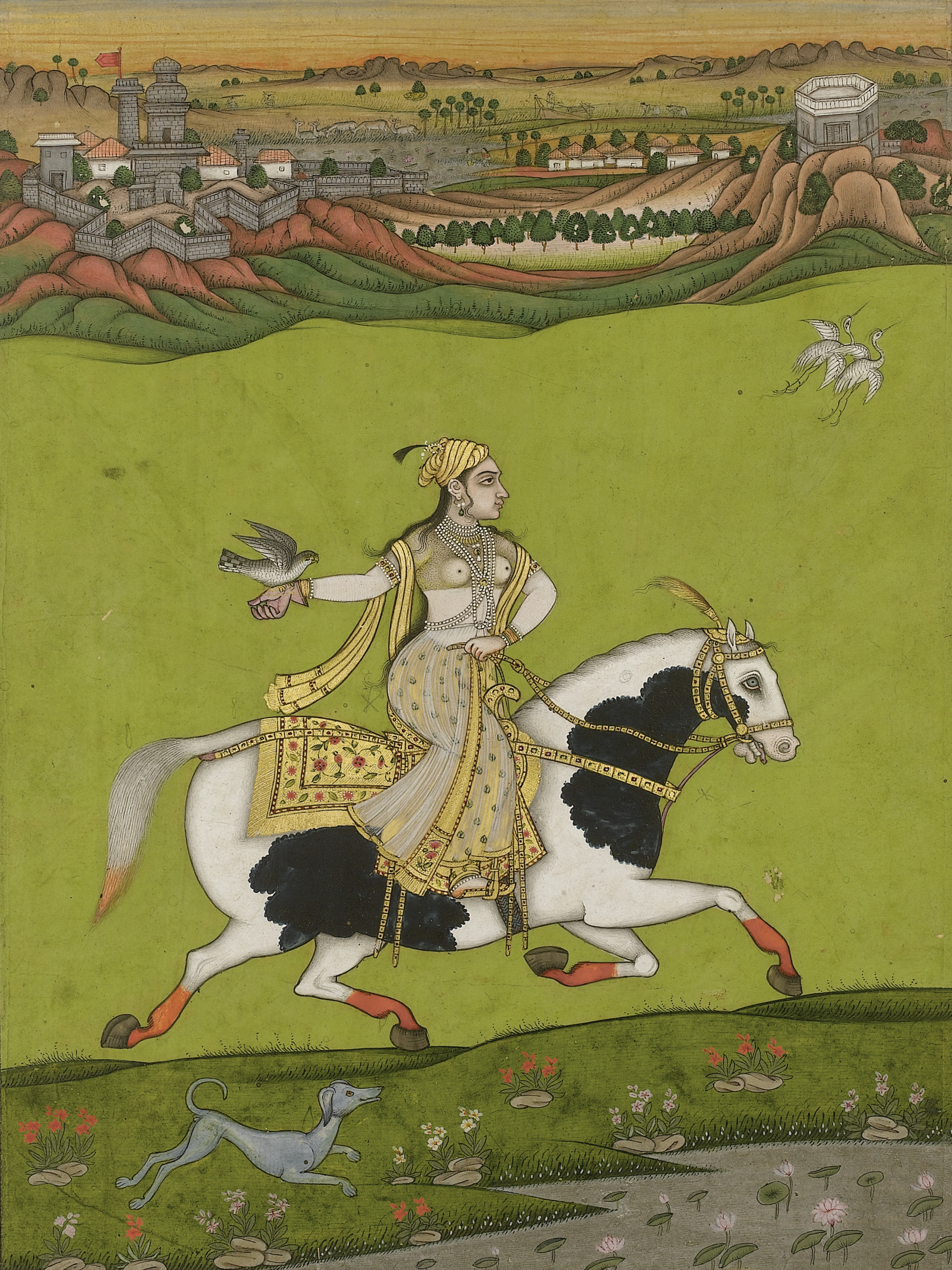
Chand Bibi hawking, an 18th-century painting

== Marriage ==
He married the famous woman warrior Chand Sultana, daughter of Nizam Shahis of Ahmadnagar.

== Reign ==
During Ali's reign Bijapur and Vijayanagar came very close to each other and Ali actually paid a visit to Vijayanagar City, where Ramaraya received him with great pomp and honour. The greatest event of Ali's reign was the successful formation of the confederacy of the Deccan Sultans against Vijayanagar and their victory over the latter at the Battle of Rakkasagi – Tangadagi in Talikoti in 1565. As a result of this battle Bijapur’s southern boundary was extended right up to the city of Vijayanagar, and further it opened the gates for the future expansion of Bijapur further south. Consequently, at the end of Ali's reign, the Bijapur Kingdom extended up to port of Honavar on the west coast and southern boundary extended along the line of Varada and Tungabhadra rivers.

== Developments ==
During Ali's reign diplomatic relations with the Mughal Emperor Akbar were established and envoys were exchanged.

== Succession ==
In 1580, Ali, having no son, appointed his nephew Ibrahim, son of his brother Tahamasif, as his successor. In the same year, Ali was assassinated by a eunuch, and was buried in Ali Ka Rouza near Sakaf Rouza in Bijapur.

== See also ==
- Adil Shahi–Portuguese conflicts

Preceded by Ibrahim Adil Shah I	Adil Shahi Rulers of Bijapur; 1558–1580	Succeeded by Ibrahim Adil Shah II
