= Upper Pus Dam =

- Location within Maharashtra
- Official name: Upper Pus (Pus) Dam D01030
- Location: Pusad
- Coordinates: 20.0057438°N 77.4506092°E
- Opening date: 1971
- Owners: Government of Maharashtra, India

Dam and spillways
- Type of dam: Earthfill
- Impounds: Pus River
- Height: 42 m (138 ft)
- Length: 744 m (2,441 ft)
- Dam volume: 1,980 km^{3} (480 cu mi)

Reservoir
- Total capacity: 91,260 km^{3} (21,890 cu mi)
- Surface area: 8,953 km^{2} (3,457 sq mi)

Upper Pus Dam, also called Pus Dam, 25 km northwest of Pusad city, is an earthfill dam on Pus river in Yavatmal district of Maharashtra state in India. There is another downstream dam 25 km southeast of Pusad city near Mahagaon, called Lower Pus Dam, which was built in 1983. Other nearby dams are Arunawati Dam (40 km north of Pusad) in Digras built in 1994 and Isapur Dam (30 km southwest of Pusad) built in 1982.

Water shortage is an issue in Vidarbha region, in June 2019 Pus dam had zero percent water of its live capacity of 91,000 million litres. Though it rose to 20.67% by 11 August 2019 due to arrival of monsoon.

== Hydrology ==
The Pus River flows through Pusad taluka, the Arunavati River and Adan River through Darwha taluka. Murray Leaf explains that the Pus valley lies in a wide but isolated upland valley in the tribal area which has small towns and very few highways as most of area is covered with teak and sal forests which are illegally felled by the poachers. Pus river originates in Ajantha, Maharashtra, near Washim town. It flows through Pusad, converges with Penganga River near Mahur in Nanded district of Maharashtra, Penganga River in turn flows into Wardha River, which in turn flows into Pranhita River, and Pranhita in turn flows in to Godavari River which finally end in the Bay of Bengal just east of Rajahmundry in the state of Andhra Pradesh. All these rivers drain the Deccan Plateau in the south-easterly and easterly directions along the general slope of the plateau.

Amravati Division of Vidharba has 446 dams. Among those the command area of medium size Pus River irrigation system has 25265 ha. of which 13680 ha is cultivatable and further 8215 ha is irrigable, and the project is designed with 114% "irrigation density" which is the ratio of total irrigated area to total irrigable area. For the irrigation, "Pus river" has Upper Pus Dam 18 km northwest of Pusad town built in 1971, and Lower Pus Dam near Mahagaon 40 km east of Pusad built in 1983. Main crops are millet, wheat, tur, cotton, groundnut, sunflower, etc. In the hilly parts of Pusad taluka the soil type is coarse gravelly or loose friable texture, of black colour.

In terms of fish farming, the minor carp fishes constitute 75 to 95% of the total catch in the Pus River reservoirs.

== Dam details ==
=== Specifications ===
The height of the dam above its lowest foundation is 42 m (138 ft) while the length is 744 m (2,441 ft). The volume content is 1,980 km^{3} (480 cu mi) and gross storage capacity is 113,920.00 km^{3} (27,330.86 cu mi).

=== Purpose ===
- Irrigation

== See also ==
- Dams in Maharashtra
- List of reservoirs and dams in India
