= Pusad =

- City
- Location in Maharashtra, India Pusad (India)
- Coordinates: 19.91°N 77.57°E
- Country: India
- State: Maharashtra
- District: Yavatmal

Government
  - Type: Municipal Council

Area
  - Total: 59 km^{2} (23 sq mi)
- Elevation: 315 m (1,033 ft)

Population (2019)
  - Total: 112,346
  - Density: 1,900/km^{2} (4,900/sq mi)
- Demonym(s): Pusadkar, Pusadian

Language
  - Official: Marathi
- Time zone: UTC+5:30 (IST)
- PIN: 445204,445215,445212,445216
- Telephone code: 07233
- Vehicle registration: MH 29 (Yavatmal district)

Pusad, with ancient name Pushpawanti named after the Pus river, is the second largest city in the Yavatmal district of Vidarbha region in Maharashtra state of India. Over the decades, ruling politicians' failure to address people's demand of district status for Pusad, has hindered development.

== History ==
=== Early era ===
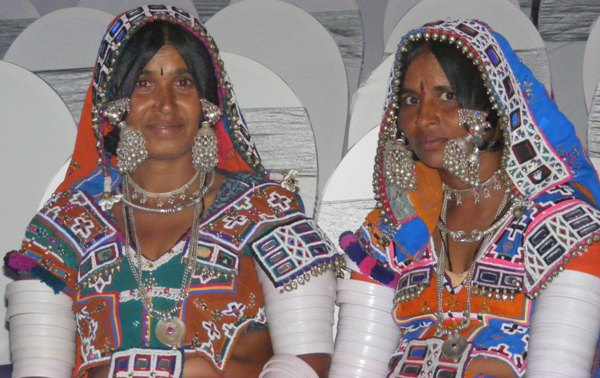
Lambani Banjara woman in traditional attire.

Pusad is a tribal area, of mostly Banjaras. Banjara of Pusad area have an oral tradition of their migration from Rajasthan toward central and south India from 12th century after the defeat and death of Prithviraj Chauhan by Muhammad Ghouri in the 1191 Battle of Tarain in present-day Haryana, a narrative which also coincides with the oral traditions of Romani gypsies of Europe who also recall 12th century Islamic invasion of India as the cause of their migration.

=== Medieval era ===
Two Aundha Nagnath Temples (Nageshwaram) in 13th century hemadpanti architecture which are an important place of pilgrimage 85 km southwest of Pusad, ruins of several temples, a fine tank exist in Pusad area as per the ASI report of 1874 CE. The present Aundha Nagnath temple is said to have been built by the Seuna (Yadava) dynasty and dates to 13th century, The first temple at this site is said to be from time of the Mahabharata and is believed to have been constructed by Yudhishthira, eldest of the Pandavas, when they were expelled for 14 years from Hastinapur. The first temple building was seven-storeyed before it was sacked by Aurangzeb.

During the 16th to 20th centuries Pusad was part of Berar Province which kept changing hands between Maratha Peshwas and Mughals. During 1760 and 1795 this area was with Maratha Bhonsla rajas of Nagpur kingdom. Marathas ceded these to British after Wellesley's victories at Assaye and Argaon (1803), who in turn handed these over to Nizam-ul-Mulk of Hyderabad State in 1804. After this Pindari and Bhil raiders too stopped their harassing raids in this area. Nizam was initially a viceroy of Hydrabad province of Mughal Empire, from 1724 CE he ruled this area independently until he came under British protectorate, after 1857 he gradually became a princely state of the British Raj.

=== British era ===
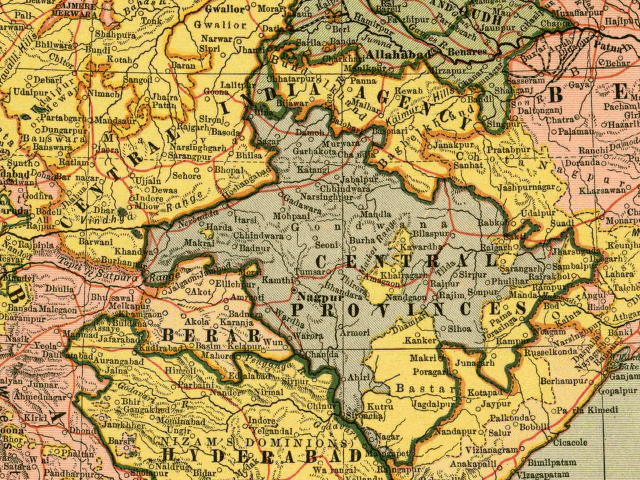
Central Provinces and its Berar Division in 1903

During British Raj Great Trigonometrical Survey (1802-1871), to install and maintain measuring marker stones, the Bittergaon and Sukli villages in Pusad area were visited regularly including in 1868 and 1873. Washim to Pusad road through Penganga reserve was constructed around 1878.

In 1853, the administration of the Berar province was assigned to the British East India Company by the Nizam following a treaty. It was divided into two districts each headed by a deputy commissioner, South Berar with its headquarters at Hingoli, and North Berar with its headquarters at Buldana. After the Indian Rebellion of 1857, Hingoli and its adjoining areas [including Pusad] were restored to the Nizam and the province was reconstituted into two districts, East Berar with its headquarters at Amravati, and West Berar with its headquarters at Akola. In 1903 Berar Province became the Berar Division of Central Provinces. In 1936 these were renamed as Central Provinces and Berar.

=== Independent India ===
In 1950 when the Constitution of India came into effect, Pusad as part of the Central Provinces & Berar was merged with the newly formed state of Madhya Pradesh. In 1956, under pressure from Marathi Irredentists, the Berar and Nagpur divisions were transferred to Bombay state. In 1960, the Bombay State was partitioned into Maharashtra & Gujarat. There is an ongoing Vidarbha movement to demand statehood for Vidarbha region, as well as a separate movement to demand upgrade of Pusad's status from taluk to district.

Vasantrao Naik, a grassroots Banjara leader, who was born in Gahuli village of Pusad remains the longest serving Chief Minister of Maharashtra from 1963 to 1975. Sudhakarrao Naik is former Chief Minister of Maharashtra from 1991 to 1993 and former Governor of Himachal Pradesh in 1994.

== Geography ==
=== Topography ===
Just north of Pusad hills is the Buldhana-Yavatmal plateau, itself part of the bigger Deccan Plateau, extends from Penganga valley of Pusad region in south, to the Purna valley of Ajanta range of Marathwada in north, and to Wardha valley in the east. It covers the southern parts of districts of Akola, Buldhana and Yavatmal. Highest elevation of 600–900 metres (2,000–3,000 ft) is found in Buldhana and Chikhuli, 450–600 metres (1,480–1,970 ft) in south around Pusad, 300–450 metres (980–1,480 ft) sloping escarpment (steep cliff) towards Purna and Wardha river valleys in north and east respectively. The edges and interior of this plateau are jagged and littered with series of hills and valleys. Hills are mostly "flat topped" (eroded former larger plateau) with sharp drops, trappean in structure, made of basalt, gradually sloping in the west but uneven in the east. Slopes are steep, dry, without many plants or trees. Further north of Ajanta range is "Amravati plateau" which extends till Gawilghur hill range.

=== Hydrology ===
The town is located on the south and western banks of the "Pus river", a tributary of Painganga River. The Pus river flows through Pusad taluka, the Arunavati River and Adan River through Darwha taluka. Murray Leaf explains that the "Pus valley" lies in a wide but isolated upland valley in the tribal area which has small towns and very few highways as most of the area is covered with teak and sal forests which are illegally felled by the poachers. Pus river originates in Ajanta range near Washim town. It flows through Pusad, converges with Penganga River near Mahur in Nanded district of Maharashtra, Penganga River in turn flows into Wardha River, which in turn flows into Pranhita River, and Pranhita in turn flows in to Godavari River which finally end in the Bay of Bengal just east of Rajahmundry in the state of Andhra Pradesh. All these rivers drain the Deccan Plateau in the south-easterly and easterly directions along the general slope of the plateau.

Pusad city has several dams nearby in all directions. On the Pus river are the Upper Pus Dam (Pus Dam, built in 1971) 25 km northwest of Pusad and downstream Lower Pus Dam (built in 1983) 25 km southeast of Pusad near Mahagaon. Painganga river, of which the Pus river is a tributary, has the Isapur Dam (Upper Painganga Dam) 30 km southwest of Pusad near Kalamnuri which was built in 1982. Arunawati Dam, 40 km north of Pusad and built in 1994, is near Digras on Arunavati River (tributary of Tapi River).

=== Climate ===
Pusad's climate is extreme, with temperatures ranging as high as 49 °C (120 °F) during summer to as low as 5 °C (41 °F) during winter. This temperature range is a result of the "Basket Effect" (i.e. high-altitude hillside effect), as Pusad is surrounded by hills.

Climate data for Pusad (1981–2010, extremes 1960–2008)
Month	Jan	Feb	Mar	Apr	May	Jun	Jul	Aug	Sep	Oct	Nov	Dec	Year
Record high °C (°F)	35.2 (95.4)	40.4 (104.7)	43.7 (110.7)	46.4 (115.5)	47.5 (117.5)	47.6 (117.7)	41.5 (106.7)	38.0 (100.4)	39.0 (102.2)	39.0 (102.2)	37.0 (98.6)	39.0 (102.2)	47.6 (117.7)
Mean daily maximum °C (°F)	30.6 (87.1)	33.3 (91.9)	37.8 (100.0)	41.3 (106.3)	42.9 (109.2)	37.8 (100.0)	32.6 (90.7)	30.9 (87.6)	32.8 (91.0)	33.2 (91.8)	31.3 (88.3)	30.1 (86.2)	34.6 (94.3)
Mean daily minimum °C (°F)	13.0 (55.4)	14.8 (58.6)	19.1 (66.4)	24.0 (75.2)	28.0 (82.4)	25.9 (78.6)	24.0 (75.2)	23.2 (73.8)	22.9 (73.2)	19.8 (67.6)	15.5 (59.9)	11.9 (53.4)	20.2 (68.4)
Record low °C (°F)	2.7 (36.9)	5.4 (41.7)	10.4 (50.7)	13.6 (56.5)	19.1 (66.4)	20.0 (68.0)	18.1 (64.6)	19.0 (66.2)	16.6 (61.9)	11.2 (52.2)	5.7 (42.3)	4.5 (40.1)	2.7 (36.9)
Average rainfall mm (inches)	15.7 (0.62)	2.7 (0.11)	10.6 (0.42)	7.8 (0.31)	11.2 (0.44)	190.1 (7.48)	221.0 (8.70)	251.6 (9.91)	146.9 (5.78)	88.1 (3.47)	21.2 (0.83)	10.4 (0.41)	957.3 (37.69)
Average rainy days	0.8	0.4	0.8	0.8	1.8	9.1	11.9	11.3	7.0	4.0	1.3	0.6	49.7
Average relative humidity (%) (at 17:30 IST)	42	33	30	27	24	49	66	71	64	50	46	43	46
Source: India Meteorological Department

== Demographics ==
=== Population ===
As of 2011 Indian Census, Pusad had a total population of 73,046, of which 37,366 were males and 35,680 were females. The population within the age group of 0 to 6 years was 8,673. The total number of literates in Pusad was 58,794, which constituted 80.5% of the population with male literacy of 83.6% and female literacy of 77.2%. The effective literacy rate of 7+ population of Pusad was 91.3%, of which the male literacy rate was 95.5% and the female literacy rate was 87.0%. The Scheduled Castes and Scheduled Tribes population was 10,194 and 3,453 respectively. Pusad had 14905 households in 2011. The nearby 6 villages is to be included in city of Pusad N. Parishad, namely Shrirampur, Kakad Dati, Dhankeshwar, Kawadipur, Gaimukhnagar and Adarsh Nagar.

Year	Male	Female	Total Population	Change	Religion (%)							
Year	Male	Female	Total Population	Change	Hindu	Muslim	Christian	Sikhs	Buddhist	Jain	Other religions and persuasions	Religion not stated
2001	34589	32577	67166	-	58.579	29.265	0.213	0.039	9.575	2.072	0.180	0.077
2011	37366	35680	73046	0.088	56.225	32.417	0.233	0.066	9.057	1.939	0.010	0.055

==== Jaati or caste based breakup of Pusad ====
Banjaras are the main tribal group of Pusad taluka, among them, Rathod and Chavhan Banjaras are most numerous. Charan Banjaras, also called Gormati Banjara, in Pusad taluk belong to both Bada Rathod and Chota Rathode clans. Main subclans among Bada Rathod are Khola, Ratla, Khatrot, Gedavat, Raslinya, and Dedavat. The main subclans among Chota Rathod are Meghwat, Ghegawat, Ralsot, Ramawat, Khelkhawat, Manlot, Harawat, Tolawat, Dudhawat, Sangawat, and Patolot. The main subclans among Jadon or Jadhav Banjaras are Dharawat, Gughlot, Badawat, Boda, Malod, Ajmera, Padya, Lakhawat, and Nulawat. The main subclans among Labhana Banjaras are Kesharot, Dhirbasi, Gugra, Rusawat, Meghawat, kachkad, Pachoria, Alwat, Khasawat, Bhokan, Katkwal, Dhobda, Machalya, Khaseria, Gozal, Borya, Ramawat, Bhutiya, Bumbholya, Retheyo, and Manzawat. There are some rare Sonar Banjara clans such as Medran. The drum beater Dhalya Banjaras who are found in Pusad, unlike other banjaras, do not have Rajput sounding names as they are like native tribes of Maharashtra who were accepted later among Banjaras as service providers. Apart from Banjaras, Pusad has a sizable Nand Gawali(Gavli),Komati (caste), Marwadi and Maratha (caste) population. Pusad also has a good population of adherents of Jain, Buddhist and Muslim religion.

== Economy ==
=== Agriculture and aquaculture sector ===
Main crops are millet, wheat, tur, cotton, groundnut, sunflower, etc. In the hilly parts of Pusad taluka the soil type is coarse gravelly or loose friable of black colour. The command area of medium size Pus River irrigation system has 25265 ha. of which 13680 ha is cultivatable and further 8215 ha is irrigable, and the project is designed with 114% "irrigation density" which is the ratio of total irrigated area to total irrigable area. For the irrigation, "Pus river" has Upper Pus Dam 18 km (11 mi) northwest of Pusad town built in 1971, and Lower Pus Dam near Mahagaon 40 km (25 mi) east of Pusad built in 1983.

In terms of fish farming, the minor carp fish constitute 75 to 95% of the total catch in the Pus river reservoirs.

=== Industrial and manufacturing sector ===
Since before 1958, Pusad has cotton ginning and oil press factories. To boost the Small and medium-sized enterprises the Banjara elites of the Pusad city established a microfinance cooperative banking society in 2006 with 1100 members.

== Culture ==
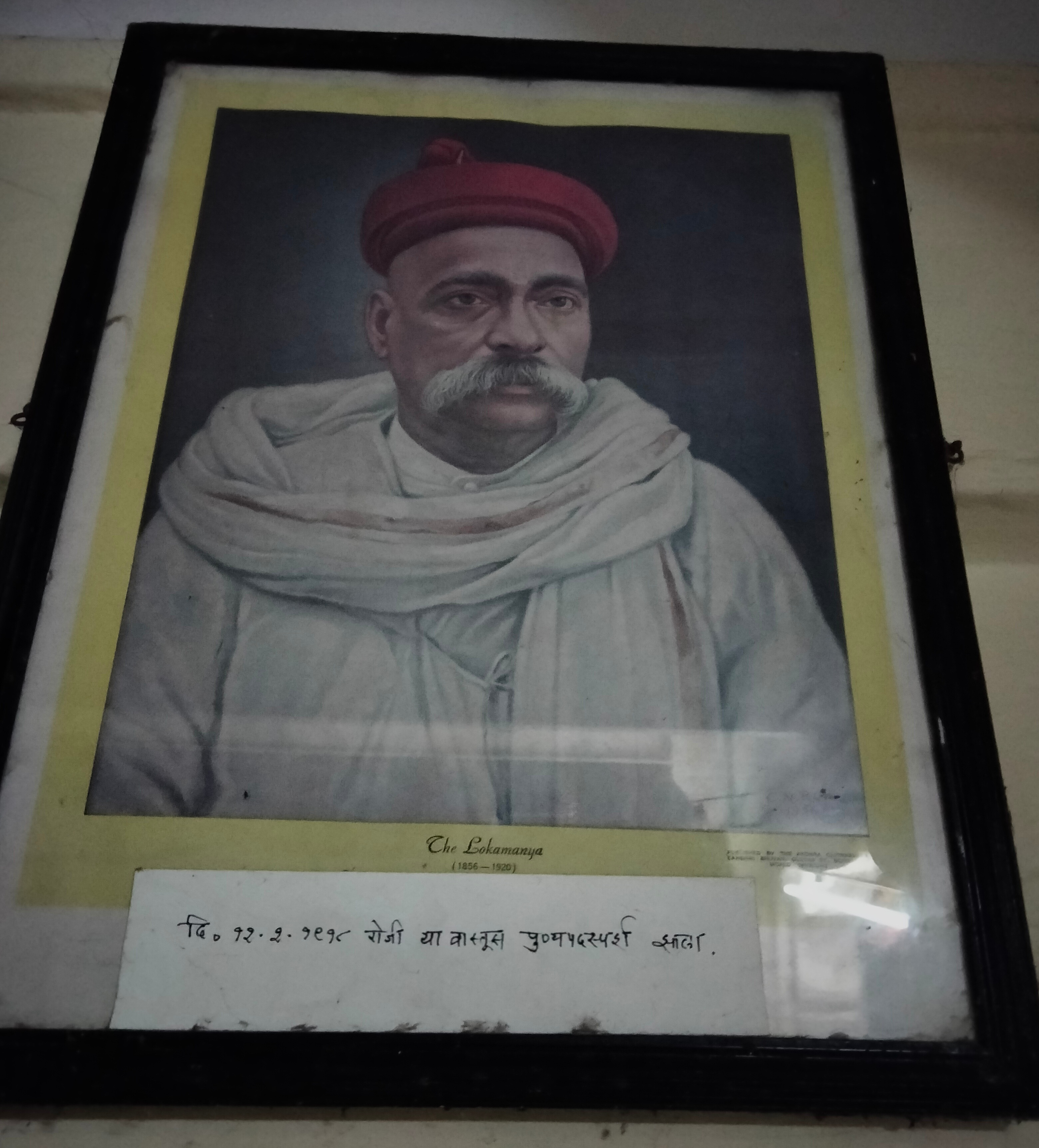
Painting of Bal Gangadhar Tilak in Narsimha Temple with a note of his visit.

Ganeshotsav and Navaratri festival is celebrated annually in Pusad. Bal Gangadhar Tilak is credited with turning Ganeshotsav into a community festival from a private ceremony. The tradition of Ganeshotsav in Pusad is linked to Tilak's visit to the city. Dankeshwar (Shiva temple), Kondeshwar Temple Wanwarla which has littile bit same design as of Kedarnath Temple and it has architecture of hemadpanti stones and Karla Jatra are major religious festivals as well.

== Transport ==
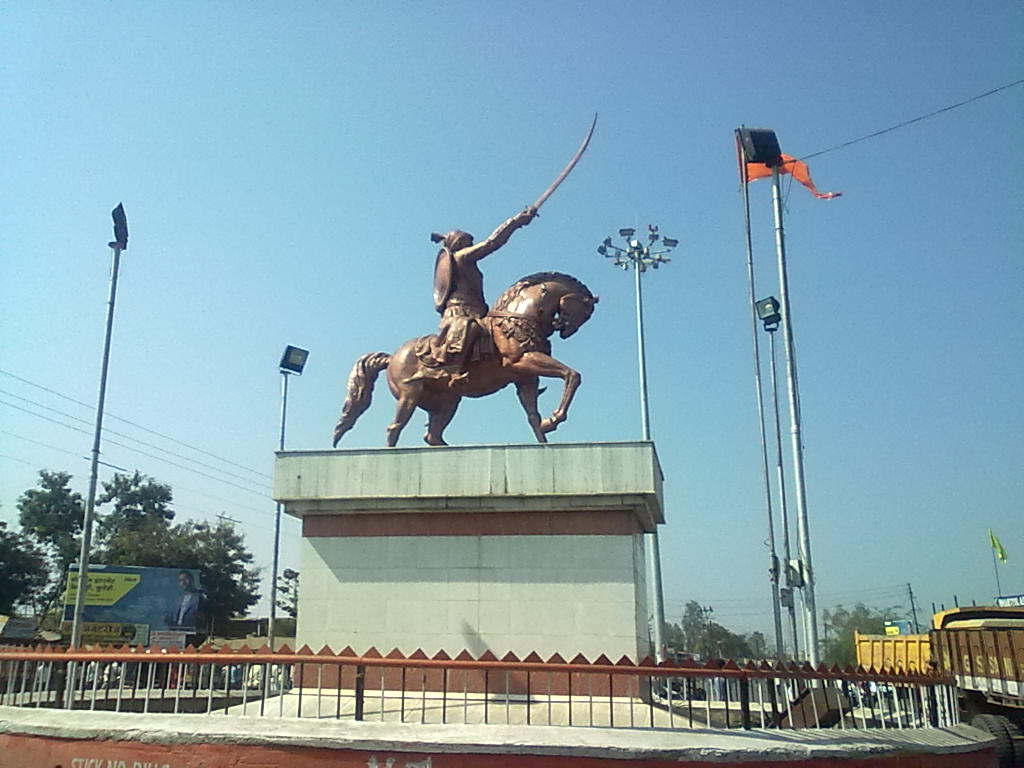
Chatrapati Shivaji Maharaj Chowk in Pusad

Pusad is connected to major cities in the Maharashtra State by roadways only. MSRTC buses run from Pusad to Mumbai, Nagpur, Yavatmal, Pune, Amravati, Akola, Washim, Hingoli, Nanded, Solapur, Aurangabad, Raipur, Umarkhed, Mahur, Ansing, Adilabad, Mahagaon and Indore. Roads in Pusad are equipped with traffic signals recently built in 2017.

Pusad was connected to Darwha Moti Bagh Junction railway station in Yavatmal by Central Provinces Railway Company, but line from Darwha to Pusad was dismantled in 1920. From Yavatmal it was further linked to Achalpur railway station in Amravati district by narrow gauge Shakuntala Railway which was built in 1903 to carry cotton from cotton-rich interior areas of Vidarbha to the Murtajapur Junction on main broad gauge line to Mumbai from where it was shipped to Manchester in England. Pusad railway station (reporting code PUB) is planned on the under construction Wardha–Nanded line, which has been given a "special project" status. Nearest railway station is at Washim 60 km (37 mi), Akola and Nanded 110 km (68 mi).

Nearest functional airports are Shri Guru Gobind Singh Ji Airport 110 km (68 mi) away in Nanded and Dr. Babasaheb Ambedkar International Airport 270 km (170 mi) away at Nagpur. Other nearby airports without functional scheduled flights are Yavatmal Airport 110 km (68 mi) and Akola Airport 140 km (87 mi).

== Education ==
- JSPM's Babasaheb Naik College of Engineering is a notable not-for-profit private engineering college established in 1983.
- Koshatwar Daulatkhan Vidyalaya and G. Mukhare Jr. College, Pusad
- Navjeevan Dnyanpeeth English Medium school
- Sudhakarrao Naik Institute of Pharmacy

== See also ==
- List of proposed districts of Maharashtra
