= Lower Pus Dam =

- Location within Maharashtra
- Official name: Lower Pus Dam D02869
- Location: Mahagaon
- Coordinates: 19.8314403°N 77.6662159°E
- Opening date: 1983
- Owners: Government of Maharashtra, India

Dam and spillways
- Type of dam: Earthfill
- Impounds: Pus River
- Height: 28 m (92 ft)
- Length: 3,346 m (10,978 ft)
- Dam volume: 6,167 km^{3} (1,480 cu mi)

Reservoir
- Total capacity: 59,630 km^{3} (14,310 cu mi)
- Surface area: 15,890 km^{2} (6,140 sq mi)

Lower Pus Dam, 25 km southeast of Pusad city, is an earthfill dam on Pus river near Mahagaon in Yavatmal district of Maharashtra state of India. There is another downstream dam 25 km northwest of Pusad city called Upper Pus Dam which was built in 1971. Other nearby dams are Arunawati Dam (40 km north of Pusad) in Digras built in 1994 and Isapur Dam (30 km southwest of Pusad) built in 1982.

Pus river originates in Ajantha range. It flows through Pusad, converges with Penganga River near Mahur in Nanded district of Maharashtra. Penganga River flows into Wardha River, which in turn into Pranhita River, and Pranhita in turn flows in to Godavari River which end in the Bay of Bengal just east of Rajahmundry in the state of Andhra Pradesh.

== Dam details ==
=== Specifications ===
The height of the dam above lowest foundation is 28 m (92 ft) while the length is 3,346 m (10,978 ft). The volume content is 6,167 km^{3} (1,480 cu mi) and gross storage capacity is 81,160.00 km^{3} (19,471.32 cu mi).

=== Purpose ===
- Irrigation

== See also ==
- Dams in Maharashtra
- List of reservoirs and dams in India
