= Shembal Pimpri =

Village in Maharashtra

Shembalpimpri is a village situated in Pusad, Yavatmal district of Maharashtra, India.

The village is named after the historical Shembaleswar temple dedicated to Shiva. In addition to Shiva, the temple also houses statues of Shani, Datta, Krishna and Rama's paduka. During month of Sawan, people from Shembal Pimpri visit the Shembaleswar temple. The distance between Pusad city and Shembalpimpri is near about 30 km. Isapur Dam is about 4 km from the village. The temple of shembaleshwar is a Hemadpanthi architecture and it is a historical monument.

also aligned to Temple Group of Village people run Go Shala with Named as "Shembaleshwar Go Seva Sadan". The village is situated on the bank of Painganga River and on the boundary of vidharbha and Marathavada region. The village is a big town in Pusad Taluka having population more than 10,000. The cultivators in the vicinity used to take the crops of mainly sugar cane, banana, soybean, wheat, cotton and ground nuts, etc.
