= Ajanta =

Ajanta may refer to:

- Ajanta Caves, an archaeological site in Mahrashtra, India
  - Ajanta, Maharashtra, a village in Aurangabad district, Maharashtra near the caves
  - Ajanta Express, a passenger train in India, named after the site
- Ajanta Group, an Indian conglomerate
- Ajanta Pharma, an Indian pharmaceutical company
- Ajanta range, a mountain range located in Maharashtra, India
- Ajanta Neog, an Indian politician
- Ajanta, pen name of Indian poet Penumarti Viswanatha Sastry

== See also ==
- Ajantha (disambiguation)
