= Wardha–Nanded line =

Railway line in Maharashtra, India

Wardha–Yavatmal–Nanded line

Overview
- Status: Active
- Termini: Wardha Junction; Hazur Sahib Nanded

Technical
- Line length: 284 km (176 mi)
- Track gauge: 5 ft 6 in (1,676 mm) broad gauge
- Electrification: Yes
- Operating speed: 130 km/h

Wardha–Yavatmal–Nanded line, with 327 km long Wardha-Kalamb-Yavatmal-Digras-Pusad-Nanded alignment, is an under-construction railway line in Maharashtra, India, which will connect Nagpur and other districts in Vidarbha with Nanded and other parts of Marathwada regions. It will reduce Wardha-Yavatmal passenger travel time from about 2 hours by road to approximately 1.5 hours by train. It will also provide transportation of major produce of Vidharba, such as cotton, soybeans, and coal, to Marathwada. It has been designated as the "special project" status by the Ministry of Railways (India).

== History ==
Revised total project cost of 284 km new line was INR3445.34 crores in 2025, spanning across six tehsils and 90 villages in Wardha, Yavatmal, Washim, Hingoli and Nanded district of Maharashtra, requiring acquisition of 722 hectares land.

== Route ==
=== Alignment ===
The final alignment of the Wardha-Kalamb-Yavatmal-Digras-Pusad-Nanded route has the following stations:

- Phase-I: Wardha-Kalamb-Yavatmal
  - Phase-I.A Wardha to Kalamb, 62 km:
    - Wardha Junction (existing city station)
    - Sevagram Junction (existing, optional interchange)
    - Deoli Station
    - Bhidi Halt Station
  - Phase-I.B Kalamb to Yavatmal, (40 km)
    - Kalamb Station (Kamathwada 5km from before Kalamb )
    - Talegaon Halt Station
    - New Yavatmal (Yavatmal) (new terminal station is different from the existing Yavatmal junction city station.)
- Phase-II: Yavatmal-Digras-Pusad
  - Phase-II.A Yavatmal-Digras (50 km)
    - Darwha Moti Bagh Junction (existing)
    - Digras (new junction station)
  - Phase-II.B Digras-Pusad, 85 km:
    - Pusad (new)
- Phase-III: Pusad-Nanded (90 km)
    - Umarkhed (new)
    - Hadgaon (new)
    - Waranga
    - Ardhapur (new)
    - Dabhad (new)
    - Mudkhed Junction railway station (existing, interchange to Nanded)
    - Maltekdi (existing)
    - Hazur Sahib Nanded junction, (existing, terminus)

=== Related connectivity ===
- Shakuntala Railway, the narrow-gauge rail track between Yavatmal old railway station and Achalpur in Amravati district, is being converted to broad-gauge.

== Current status ==
- Overall:
  - 2025 May: 47% physical work is complete with 91% of the total revised total budget of INR 3,445 exhausted with target completion date still showing January 2026 for the whole Wardha-Nanded route. RVNL achieved the breakthrough in 370 meter long T3 tunnel between Digras and Pusad in June 2025 after 4 months of tunneling.
- Phase-I Wardha-Kalamb-Yavatmal, completed and operational.
  - Phase-I.I Wardha to Kalamb, completed and operational.
  - Phase-I.II Kalamb to Yavatmal, completed and operational.
- Phase-II Yavatmal-Digras-Pusad, under-construction (2028 target):
  - Phase-II.I Yavatmal-Digras, under-construction (2027 target): revised target as of June 2025.
  - Phase-II.II Digras-Pusad, under-construction (2028 target): revised target as of June 2025 if land acquisition is resolved.
- Phase-III Pusad-Nanded, under-construction (2029 target): revised target as of June 2025 if protests and land issues are resolved.

== See also ==
- Expressways in Maharashtra
  - Nagpur–Goa Shaktipeeth Expressway, via Yavatmal-Pusad-Hingoli-Parbhani-Latur
  - Jalna-Nanded Expressway, northwest to southeast via Parbhani
- Rail transport in India
  - Akola–Ratlam line gauge conversion (target completion 31 March 2028), once complete will provide shortest route between North-Northwest India and South-Southeast India
  - Bhopal-Ramganj Mandi line, under-construction with target completion by December 2027, will provide shorter route from Ludiana-Hisar-Jaipur-Kota to Bhopal
  - Manmad–Indore line, target completion date of 2028-29.
  - Shakuntala Railway, gauge conversion of line which runs parallel to the west of Wardha-Nanded line
  - Future of rail transport in India
  - Indian Railway
