= Babasaheb Naik College of Engineering, Pusad =

College in Maharashtra, India

Coordinates: 19°53′38″N 77°32′43″W

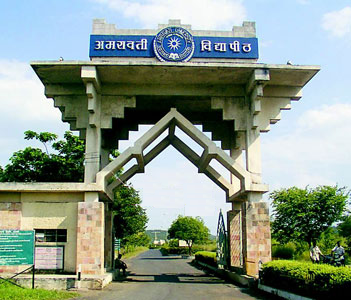
- Motto: प्रज्वलितो ज्ञानमय प्रदीपा
- Motto in English: Ignite learned lamps (Kindle knowledgeable beacons)
- Type: Undergraduate & postgraduate private engineering college
- Established: 1983 (43 years ago)
- Founder: Sudhakarrao Naik (former Chief Minister of Maharashtra)
- Parent institution: Janata Shikshan Prasarak Mandal (JSPM)
- Accreditation: (NAAC); ISO 9001- 2008; Government of Maharashtra GRADE A institute
- Academic affiliations: UGC; Association of Commonwealth Universities; Institution of Engineers (India); Sant Gadge Baba Amravati University
- President: Jaibhau Naik
- Principal: Avinash M. Wankhade
- Academic staff: 181
- Administrative staff: 141
- Students: 2784 sanctioned (1910 enrolled)
- Undergraduates: 1800
- Postgraduates: 100+
- Doctoral students: 10+
- Other students: 100+ in Pradhan Mantri Kaushal Vikas Yojana
- Location: Sootgirni-Karla Road, Kakaddati, Pusad, Yavatmal district, Vidarbh region of Maharashtra, 445215
- Campus: Urban, 30 acres (12 ha)
- Language: English (official medium of instruction, Hindi and Marathi (both widely used on campus)
- Website: www.bncoepusad.ac.in

Babasaheb Naik College of Engineering (BNCoE), Pusad, founded in 1983, is a not-for-profit engineering college run by the Janta Shikshan Prasharak Mandal, located at Pusad in Vidarbha region of the state of Maharashtra, India.

== History ==
Janta Shikshan Prasarak Mandal was established and registered as a society in 1960. The Founder President of JSPM was Late Shri. Vasantrao Naik - the former Chief Minister of Maharashtra (1963 to 1975), and the Founder Secretary was Sudhakarrao Naik - the former Chief Ministers of Maharashtra (1991 to 1993) and former Governor of Himachal Pradesh (1994 to 1995). In 1961, the JSPM started Phulsing Naik Mahavidyalaya at Pusad with an enrollment of 100 student.

in 1983–84, the JSPM started Babasaheb Naik College of Engineering (BNCOE). In 1984–1985, the JSPM started Sudhakarrao Naik Institute of Pharmacy, and Dr. NP Hirani Institute of Polytechnic. In 1991, the JSPM started JSPM College of Physical Education.

As of 2014, JSPM runs 22 schools, colleges and hostels. Today JSPM society imparts education to more than 10,000 students every year.

== Location ==
Located within Kakaddati locality, the college is 2 km (1.2 mi) on SH-215 Karla Road from the Pusad bus stand, 110 km (68 mi) from district headquarters Yavatmal via SH-210 or alternate route via SH-213, 155 km (96 mi) from Amravati via NH-161G, 255 km (158 mi) from Nagpur via NH-53 and NH-361, 580 km (360 mi) from the state capital Mumbai, 1,290 km (800 mi) from the national capital Delhi and 1,470 km (910 mi) from Hisar.

Nearest railway station are at Nanded - 110 km (68 mi) for south bound, Akola - 140, 60 km (37 mi) from Hingoli and Washim 61 km (38 mi) for west & south bound, Wardha - 180 km (110 mi) for north bound and Nagpur - 255 km (158 mi) for north and east bound passengers.

Nearest airports with regular scheduled commercial flights is 255 km (158 mi) away Dr. Babasaheb Ambedkar International Airport at Nagpur. Other airports nearby with no regular scheduled commercial flights are Yavatmal Airport at Yavatmal - 110 km (68 mi), Shri Guru Gobind Singh Ji Airport at Nanded - 110 km (68 mi), Akola Airport at Akola - 140 km (87 mi), Amravati Airport at Amravati - 155 km (96 mi), and Osmanabad Airport at Osmanabad - 313 km (194 mi).

== Affiliations and accreditation ==
BNCoE, Pusad is affiliated to the Sant Gadge Baba Amravati University which is recognized under Section 12(B) of the University Grants Commission (UGC) Act of Ministry of Human Resource Development (India), Government of India as well as accredited by the National Assessment and Accreditation Council (NAAC) (Permanent AICTE Application#: 1-4318017). Sant Gadge Baba Amravati University is an associate member of the Association of Commonwealth Universities, London. Independent recognition of BNCoE, Pusad by University Grants Commission (UGC) makes it eligible for the UGC grants for the schemes related to students and teachers.

BNCoE, Pusad is accredited by the All India Council for Technical Education and its successor National Board of Accreditation (NBA) for running undergraduate and postgraduate courses in various branches of engineering.

BNCoE, Pusad is ISO 9001- 2008 certified, accredited by Institution of Engineers (India) and has been awarded 'GRADE A' by the Government of Maharashtra.

BNCoE, Pusad Laboratory facilities have been recognized as PhD-level by the Sant Gadge Baba Amravati University. Though BNCoE, Pusad itself does not directly offer any PhD courses but this recognition allows its staff to pursue PhD courses while using college laboratory facilities for the research.

== Courses ==
The college runs Bachelor of Engineering (BE)and Master of Engineering courses.

=== Bachelor of Engineering (BE) courses ===
The college has 1st year intake of 660 in the Bachelor of Engineering (BE) courses of minimum 4 years duration in the following academic disciplines:

| Engineering Branch/Specialization | Morning Shift Intake | Evening Shift Intake | Notes |
|---|---|---|---|
| Civil Engineering (started in 1983) | 120 | 0 | |
| Computer Science & Engineering (started in 1985) | 60 | 00 | |
| AI and Data science (started in 2021) | 60 | 00 | |
| Mechanical Engineering (started in 1983) | 60 | | |
| Electronics and Telecommunication Engineering (started in 1983) | 30 | 0 | |
| Electrical (started in 1983) and Power Engineering (started in 2012) | 60 | 0 | |
| Total | 330 | 00 | 330 |

=== Master of Engineering (ME) courses ===
The college has 1st year intake of 18 students (total 52) in each of the following Master of Engineering courses of minimum 2 years (4 semester) duration.

| ME Course Specialization | Department | Intake | Notes |
|---|---|---|---|
| CAD/CAM (started in 2011) | Mechanical Engineering | 18 | |
| Computer Science & Engineering (started in 2011) | Computer Science & Engineering | 18 | |
| Digital Electronics (started in 2010) | Electronics Engineering | 18 | |
| Structural Engineering (started in 2010) | Civil Engineering | 18 | |
| Total | | 72 | |

== Facilities ==
The college has 43,200 square metres (465,000 sq ft) of buildings spread over a 30-acre (12 ha) campus which has the following on-site facilities:

=== Teaching, laboratories, and research ===
- Auditorium: 750-seats centrally air-cooled auditorium
- Classrooms: nearly 100 classrooms and labs spread across several buildings of Computer & IT block, Electronics and Electrical block, Civil & Mechanical block, Workshops and Admin block
- Electricity: 24 Hrs. Electric Supply through express feeder with a 140 kVA backup Generator, college has also set up a Hybride Energy park with Solar Energy and Windmill
- Internet: campus-wide 4 Mbit/s leased line internet and intranet connecting 1000+ computers, Wi-Fi Language lab, live lectures are delivered from IIT Bombay
- Laboratory: 72 well furnished lab facilities, with equipment worth INR8+ crore, have been recognized as PhD-level by the Sant Gadge Baba Amravati University, this allows the students staff to pursue undergraduate, ME and PhD-level research
- Library: Well equipped 1500 sq. meter LAN-connected computerized Digital Library with 11000+ titles, 60000+ books, 27 national and 450 international journals, reading space for 200 members, audio-video facilities, free book bank for 700 meritorious & Scheduled Castes and Scheduled Tribes (SC/CT) students, 30 internet terminals with 45 Mbit/s bandwidth connection, photocopy facilities and more than 1500 international E-journals (IEEE, ASME, ASCE), etc. Library is open 24 hours during the exams. Further expansion of library is planned in 2014–2015 with addition of 4500 sq meter air-conditioned reading space on the 1st floor as well as more class rooms on top of the library.
- Teaching staff of 181 includes 23 professors, 48 Assistant professors and 120 lecturers with a student-teacher ratio of 10:1 in 2017
- Competitive examination: Special classes for the GATE, GRE, TOEFL, etc.
- Campus placement Department: organizes campus placement drives with employers (e.g. Indian Army, Indian Navy, Cognizant, IBM, Infosys, TCS, etc.) and provides training in employability, soft-skills, interviewing skills and guidance for the higher education in India and overseas

=== Accommodation ===
- Hostels: 4 boys' & 2 girls' hostels that can accommodate about 992 & 350 students respectively, All six hostels have internet connectivity, Mess (dining hall) and own separate large Recreation Halls with Newspaper & Reading Rooms and various games such as Table tennis, Badminton court, Carom, Chess, TV, etc.
- Faculty Accommodation: 38 residential units for married teaching staff members and a bungalow for the Principal
- Guesthouse accommodation: 5 (air conditioned) units with attached ensuite bathroom for guests, parents and other visitors

=== Sports ===
- Gymnasium - one multi-gym in the basement of computer science hostel
- Badminton - 1 indoor court in each of the 6 hostels
- Basketball - 1 outdoor concrete court
- Judo & Karate - coaching classes are held for students
- Table tennis - 2 tables in each of the 6 hostels
- Lawn Tennis - 2 outdoor courts with floodlights
- Volleyball - 2 outdoor courts
- One multipurpose ground for athletics, cricket, football, handball, hockey, kabaddi, kho kho, and softball
- Annual sports competition among hostels on special occasions
- Annual sports festival & competition Gaiety among students
- Participation in District, university and state sports competitions

=== Cultural and social facilities ===
- Arts: Arts Club, Drama club and Music Club
- Cultural events: Annual Cultural festival & competition Gaiety and Youth Festival
- Religious Festivals: Officials events are held to celebrate the Ganesha Chaturthi Festival, Holi Festival, Iftar Party, Krishna Janmashtami, Lohri Festival, New Year Party and Saraswati Pooja
- Social learning: NSS, ISTE Chapter, IE (India) Chapter, Path Finders Club and Quiz Club
- Venues include Auditorium, Open air theater, Recreation Halls, library and grounds

== Board of Management ==
The longest-serving former Chief Minister of Maharashtra late Vasantrao Naik was the founder chairman of the Janta Shikshan Prasarak Mandal and its various educational institutes, including the Babasaheb Naik College of Engineering, Pusad. After him, his nephews late Sudhakarrao Naik (also a former Chief Minister of Maharashtra) and his brother Manohar Naik (current 2014-2019 MLA from Pusad) served as the members of the managing committee.

== Sister organizations ==
The Janata Shikshan Prasarak Mandal (JSPM), along with BNCOE, has also founded the following educational institutes:

Professional Institutes

| SN# | Name | Founded | Courses | Address | Notes |
| 1 | Dr. NP HIrani Institute of Polytechnic, Pusad | 1984 | Diploma in Engineering | Pusad-Karla road | Right next to BNCOE |
| 2 | Sudhakarrao Naik Institute of Pharmacy, Pusad | 1983 | DipPharm, BPharm, MPharm | 1.2 km from the Pusad bus stand on Pusad-Digras-Nagpur Road | |
| 3 | Physical Education College, Pusad | 1991 | BPEd | Pusad-Nagpur road | |

Degree Colleges

| SN# | Name | Founded | Courses | Address | Notes |
| 4 | Phulsingh Naik Mahavidalaya, Pusad | 1961 | HSc (Voc), BA, BSC, BCom, BCA, BLib, MA, MCom, MSc | Pusad-Nagpur Road | Across Pus River |
| 5 | Srimati Vatsalbai Naik Mahila Mahavidalaya | 1989 | 11th and 12th, BA, BCom, BSC (home science), MA (Sanskrit, history, home economics) | Talao layout | |

'Schools in Pusad city

| SN# | Name | Founded | Courses | Address | Notes |
| 6 | JSPM School, Pusad | 1989 | 5th to 10th | in front of Phulsing Naik Mahavidalaya on Nagpur road | |
| 7 | JSPM School (new), Pusad | 2003 | 8th to 10th | Talav layout | |
| 8 | JSPM School, Itawa | 1989 | 1st to 4th | Itawa, 1.2 km from Pusad bus stand on Nagpur road | |
| 9 | JSPM Upper Primary Urdu School, Pusad | 1990 | 1st to 7th | Rabbani nagar, behind Pus River! | |

Outside Pusad city agglomeration

| SN# | Name | Founded | Courses | Address | Notes |
| 10 | JSPM School, Gaul | 1992 | 5th to 12th | Gaul village, Yavatmal district | 32 km from Pusad on Pusad-Mahagaon MS HS 183 |
| 11 | JSPM Urdu Vidayalaya, Fulsawangi | 1990 | 5th to 12th | Fulsawangi village, Mahagaon taluka, Yavatmal district | 48 km from Pusad on Mahagaon-Kinwat MS HS 232 highway road |
| 12 | JSPM Vidalaya, Bansi | 1984 | 5th to 12th | Bansi village | 15 km from Pusad via a link road off Nagpur road |

== In popular culture ==
BNCOE is the location of Anna's Canteen novel written by 1988-91 BNCOE alumni Charanjit Singh Minhas. The BNCOE Pusad song pays tribute to the life of students at BNCOE.

== See also ==
- BNCOE Pusad song, with 1988-92 pictures when campus was still developing and admin block was still under construction
- Video collage of BNCOE pictures till 2016
- Kumar Vishwas show at BNCOE in 2016
- Maitri reunion of 1983-87 batch held at Chikhaldara in 2017, video length: 1.12 hours
- Gaiety 2010 dance performance
