= Major State Highway 3 (Maharashtra) =

Road in Maharashtra, India

Major State Highway 3

Route information
- Maintained by MSRDC
- Length: 608 km (378 mi)

Major junctions
- West end: Solapur, Solapur
- NH 9, NH 211, NH 222, National Highway 7 (India, old numbering)
- East end: Butibori, Nagpur

Location
- Country: India
- State: Maharashtra
- Districts: Solapur, Osmanabad, Latur, Nanded, Yavatmal, Wardha and Nagpur.
- Primary destinations: Solapur, Tuljapur, Ausa, Latur, Chakur, Ahmedpur, Nanded, Umarkhed, Mahagaon, Arni, Yavatmal, Wardha - Uptill Butibori - Via NH 7 Uptill Nagpur

Highway system
- Roads in India; Expressways; National; State; Asian; State Highways in Maharashtra

Maharashtra Major State Highway 3, commonly referred to as MH MSH 3, is a major state highway that runs through Solapur, Osmanabad, Latur, Nanded, Yavatmal, Wardha and Nagpur districts in the state of Maharashtra and State Highway 11 (Maharashtra). This state highway touches numerous cities and villages VIZ. Solapur, Tuljapur, Ausa, Latur, Chakur, Ahmedpur, Nanded, Umarkhed, Mahagaon, Arni, Yavatmal, Wardha - Butibori - Via NH 7 Uptill Nagpur.

== Summary ==
This Highway is the longest State Highway in Maharashtra State. This highway is already declared National Highway as NH 204 by Government of India. NH 204 is starting from Ratnagiri in Ratnagiri district passing through Kholapur, Sangli, Solapur and passing along with MH MSH 3 up to Butibori 28 km south of Nagpur city

== Route description ==
Below is the brief summary of the route followed by this state highway.

== Major junctions ==
=== National highways ===
- NH 9 near Solapur city.
- NH 211 near Solapur city.
- NH 222 in Nanded city.
- NH 7 at Butibori near Nagpur city.

== Connections ==
Many villages, cities and towns in various districts are connected by this state highway.

== See also ==
- List of state highways in Maharashtra
