= Akola Bazar =

Akola Bazar Akola Bajar
- town
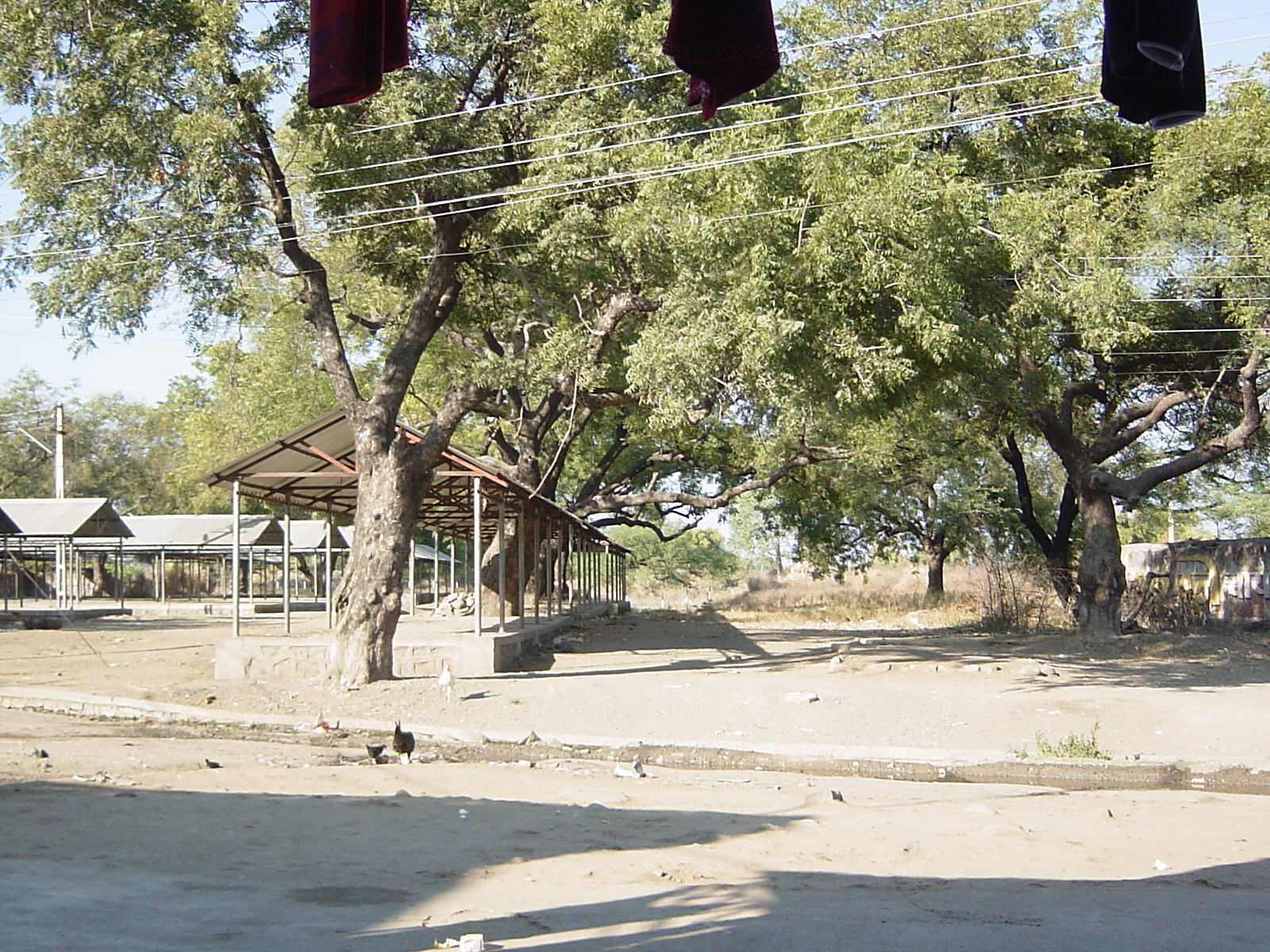
- Aathwadi Bazar

- Location in Maharashtra, India
- Coordinates: 20°10′2.38″N 78°9′1.15″E
- Country: India
- State: Maharashtra
- District: Yavatmal

Population (2001)
  - Total: 3,526
  - Density: 181/km^{2} (470/sq mi)

Languages
  - Official: Marathi
- Time zone: UTC+5:30 (IST)
- PIN: 445109
- Telephone code: 07232
- Vehicle registration: MH-29
- Nearest city: Yavatmal
- Lok Sabha constituency: Yavatmal

Akola Bazar is a small town in Yavatmal district. Akola Bazar got its name to avoid confusion with the larger city of Akola. It was named Akola Bazar because of the weekly bazaar (Aathawadi Bazar) that is held in the town every Friday.

== Demographics ==
As of 2001[update] India census, Akola Bazar had a population of 3,526. Males constitute 52% of the population and females 48%. Yavatmal has an average literacy rate of 74%, higher than the national average of 59.5%: male literacy is 83%, and female literacy is 74%. In Yavatmal, 12% of the population is under 6 years of age. The density of the population is 181 persons per square kilometre.

== Geography ==
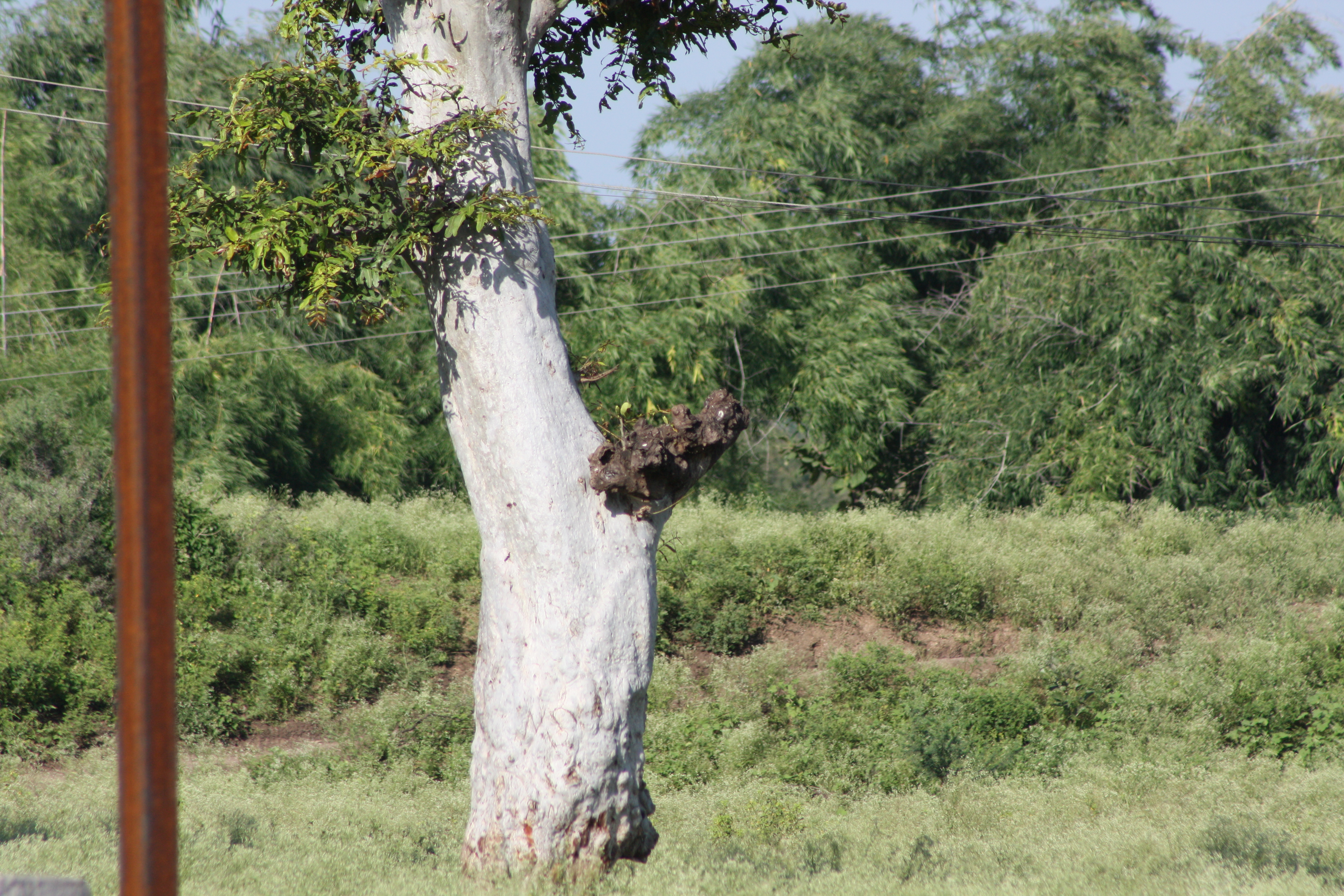
Anjan tree near Bandarbaba

Akola Bazar has two rivers, intersecting at the northeast corner of the town near Bandar Baba Temple. The first river originates in a dam near Loni and flows through Loni, Pimpri, Hathgaon before merging into the second river at Akola Bazar. The second river rises near Hibri on Maharashtra State Highway. It flows through Salod before reaching Akola Bazar. It further flows through Manjarda and then merges into Adan River. One can see several Anjan trees on the bank of these rivers.

== Climate ==
The climate of the town is, in general, hot and dry with moderately cold winters. The hot season begins in March and extends up to the first week of June. This is followed by the southwest monsoon season which lasts up till the end of September. October and November constitute the post-monsoon season and is followed by the cold season which lasts up till February.

The summer season from March to May is one of continuous rise in both day and night temperature. May is generally the hottest month of the year with the mean daily maximum temperature at about 42 °C (108 °F). With the withdrawal of the monsoon daytime temperatures increase slightly while night temperatures progressively decrease. From about the end of November, both day and night temperature fall rapidly and December is usually the coldest month of the year with the mean daily minimum temperature at about 13 °C (55 °F). The cold waves over northern India sometimes affect the place and the minimum temperature may drop to about 5 °C (41 °F).

=== 2012 flood ===
On Friday, 10 August 2012 during monsoon season, due to heavy rain, rivers overflowed wiping out more than 260 villages in Vidharbha. Akola Bazar was one of the victims of this flood situation. Then chief minister of Maharashtra, Prithviraj Chavan, visited Akola Bazar among few other villages on Friday, 11 August 2012.
