= Isapur Dam =

- Location within Maharashtra
- Official name: Isapur Dam D02978
- Location: Kalamnuri, Hingoli, Yavatmal, Nanded
- Coordinates: 19.76425°N 77.3764515°E
- Opening date: 1982
- Owners: Government of Maharashtra, India

Dam and spillways
- Type of dam: Earthfill
- Impounds: Penganga River
- Height: 57 m (187 ft)
- Length: 4,120.1 m (13,517 ft)
- Dam volume: 1.1216 km^{3} (0.2691 cu mi)

Reservoir
- Total capacity: 0.951000 km^{3} (0.228157 cu mi)
- Surface area: 0 km^{2} (0 sq mi)

Isapur Dam (Upper Painganga Dam), on Painganga River, is an earthfill dam on Painganga River near Kalamnuri in the state of Maharashtra in India.

== Specifications ==
The height of the dam above its lowest foundation is 57 m (187 ft), while the length is 4,120.1 m (13,517 ft). The gross storage capacity is 1.254000 km^{3} (0.300851 cu mi) in volume.

It is one of the biggest dams in Maharashtra, and ranked at fourth position having around a 3.5 km (2.2 mi) long earthwall.

As per the Government Resolution dated October 9, 2024, the Upper Painganga Project (Isapur Dam) has been officially named the "Adyakrantiveer Raje Novsaji Naik Reservoir." This Government Resolution has been published on the official website of the Government of Maharashtra and bears the computer code 202410091510209627. The dam has been named in memory of "Raje Novsaji Naik" and his associates, who waged a fierce struggle against the Nizam and the British for over twenty years (1799–1819) within the Painganga River basin.

== Purpose ==
The dam is used for irrigation.

Isapur is reached by first travelling to Shembalpimpri. Isapur is situated 4 km (2.5 mi) west of Shembalpimpri. To reach Shembalpimpri there are three different routes: from Pusad (27 km (17 mi)), from Umarkhed (30 km (19 mi)), and from Hingoli (41 km (25 mi)).

== Location ==
Shembaleshwar Temple is 1 km (0.62 mi) to the west of Shembalpimpri.

Anchuleshwar Temple is around 6 km (3.7 mi) from Isapur, to the west of Isapur.

== See also ==
- Arunawati Dam in Digras
- Upper Pus Dam in Pusad
- Lower Pus Dam in Mahagaon
- Dams in Maharashtra
- List of reservoirs and dams in India
