= Ajantha =

Ajantha may refer to:

- Ajanta Caves, a UNESCO World Heritage Site near Ajantha, Maharashtra
- Ajantha, Maharashtra, a village in Maharashtra, India
- Ajantha (1987 film), a 1987 Indian Malayalam-language film starring Shankar
- Ajantha (2009 film), a 2009 Indian Tamil-language film starring Ramana
- Ajantha (2012 film), a 2012 Indian Malayalam-language film starring Vinu Mohan and Honey Rose
- Ajantha Mendis (born 1985), Sri Lankan cricketer

== See also ==
- Ajanta (disambiguation)
