= Arunawati Dam =

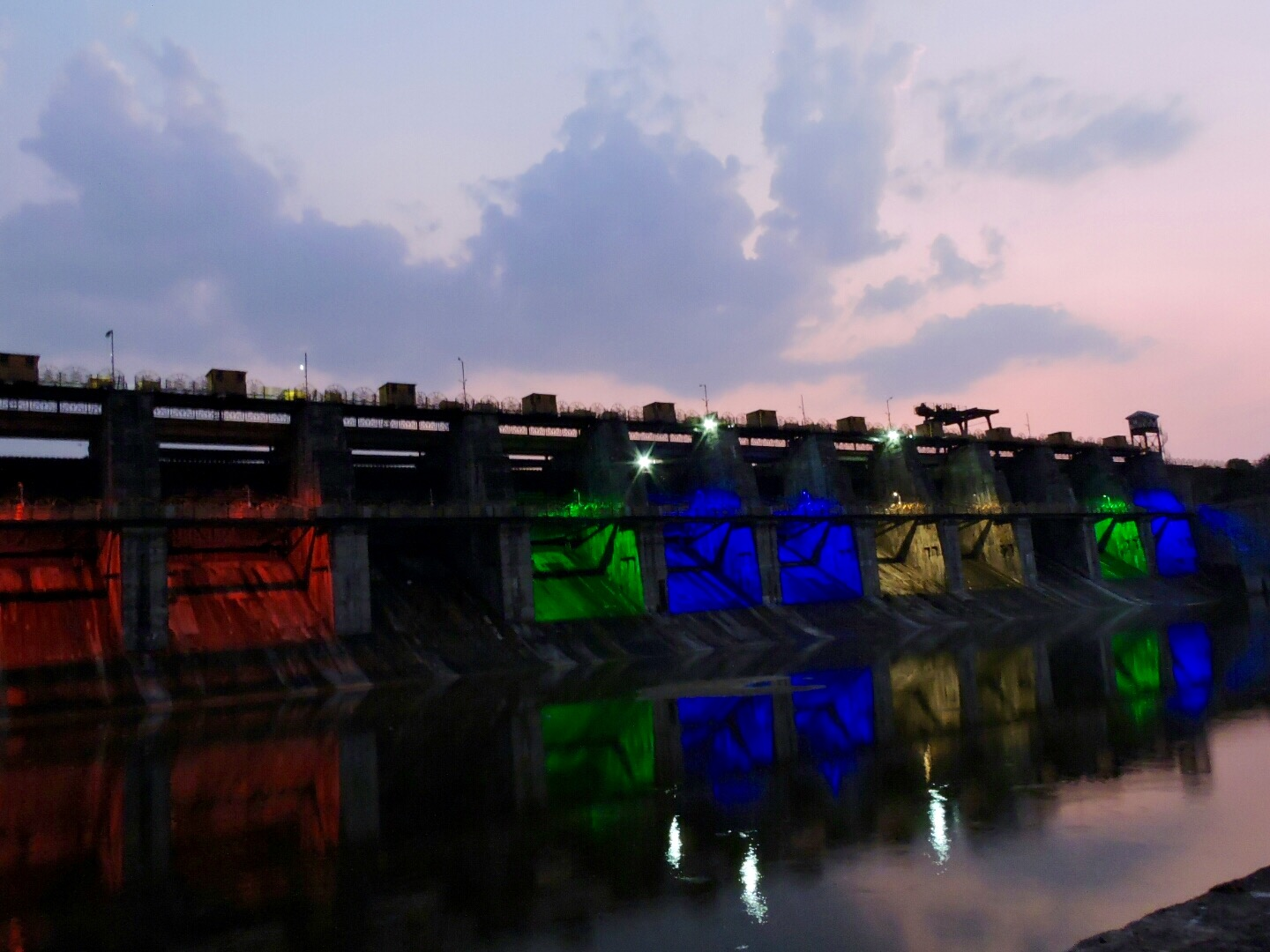
- Arunavati Dam

- Location within Maharashtra
- Official name: Arunawati Dam
- Location: Digras
- Coordinates: 20.1313238°N 77.7493107°E
- Opening date: 1994
- Owners: Government of Maharashtra, India

Dam and spillways
- Type of dam: Earthfill; Gravity
- Impounds: Arunawati river
- Height: 29.5 m (97 ft)
- Length: 5,170 m (16,960 ft)
- Dam volume: 4,412,000 m^{3} (155,800,000 cu ft)

Reservoir
- Total capacity: 169,675,000 m^{3} (5.9920×10^{9} cu ft)
- Surface area: 60 km^{2} (23 sq mi)

Arunawati Dam is an earthfill and gravity dam on Arunavati River near Digras in Yavatmal district of state of Maharashtra in India.

== Specifications ==
The height of the dam above its lowest foundation is 29.5 m (97 ft) while the length is 5,170 m (16,960 ft). The volume content is 4,412,000 m^{3} (155,800,000 cu ft) and gross storage capacity is 198,395,000 m^{3} (7.0063×10^{9} cu ft).

== Purpose ==
- Irrigation & flood control

== See also ==
- Isapur Dam
- Upper Pus Dam in Pusad
- Lower Pus Dam in Mahagaon
- Dams in Maharashtra
- List of reservoirs and dams in India
