= Painganga Wildlife Sanctuary =

Wildlife sanctuary in Maharashtra, India

Coordinates: 19°35′10″N 78°02′30″E

- IUCN category IV (habitat/species management area)
- Interactive map of Painganga Wildlife Sanctuary
- Location: Nanded and Yavatmal districts, Maharashtra, India
- Area: 325 km^{2} (125 sq mi)
- Established: 1996

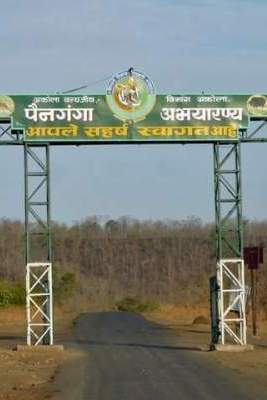
Entry gate of Painganga Wildlife Sanctuary

Painganga Wildlife Sanctuary is the name given to the protected forests on both sides of the Painganga River which divides Yavatmal district and Nanded district, Maharashtra, India. The Painganga Wildlife Sanctuary was established on January 1, 1996. It covers an area of about 325 sq. km. in the Pusad forest, in which teak is the main tree. Supervision and direct control is in the hands of the sub-conservator (wildlife) Pandharkavada, reporting to the Government of Maharashtra.

== Description ==
The sanctuary is surrounded on three sides by water.

Painganga Wildlife Sanctuary is about 150 km from Yavatmal and is accessible by bus either via Yavatmal Umarkhed or via Yavatmal-Mahagaon-Dhanki-Bittergaon, or else by private vehicles or autorickshaws from Umarkhed or Dhanki Bittergaon.

=== Species ===
Due to annual rainfall of between 1000 mm and 1500 mm and the surrounding Painganga river reservoir, many trees grow in the sanctuary area, including arjun (Terminalia arjuna), amla (Phyllanthus emblica), kadamba (Neolamarckia cadamba), gulvel (Tinospora cordifolia), charoli (Buchanania lanzan), chinch (tamarind), dhavda (Anogeissus latifolia), behda (Terminalia bellirica), moha (Madhuca longifolia), sag (drumstick tree, otherwise moringa) and haldu (Haldina cordifolia).

There are about 200 species of herbs in the sanctuary, also reeds and grasses (for example, kusali, khas, tirkadi, pavanya, marvel). The animals are mostly herbivores and insectivores: pangolins, chinkara, chital, four-horned antelope (chausinga), nilgai, Indian muntjac, masanya ud, etc., with small carnivores and omnivores: striped hyenas (taras), jungle cats, sloth bears, foxes. Larger carnivores include leopards and wild dogs.

Reptiles in this sanctuary include python, Russell's viper (ghona), Bengal monitor (ghorpad), Indian rat snake (dhaman), saw-scaled viper (fursa), red-mouthed lizards, [sic] and others and there are many species of birds.

There is a forest department rest house in Kharbi village near the entrance of the sanctuary.

== Kinwat Sanctuary ==
Common to Yavatmal and Nanded districts, but mostly in the Nanded district, there is another sanctuary called Kinwat Sanctuary. This sanctuary is also in the valley of the Painganga river. Its total area in both the districts is 219 sq. km. The nearest railway station is Kinwat on the Mudkhed-Adilabad railway line and the distance from the railway station to the sanctuary is 5 km. This sanctuary is 138 km from Nanded by road or by autorickshaw from Paida Nagdav. There are regular bus services from Yavatmal and Nanded. The forest gets drinking water every twelve months.

It is a dry deciduous forest containing teak, salai, haldu, kullu, sawar, moi, ain and other trees and wild animals such as tiger, bibte, nilgai, bear, sambar, chital, chinkara, wild boar and muntjac. Bird life is also rich.

Accommodation is available at Painganga Wildife Sanctuary rest house, and at Kinwat Forest rest houses at Kharbi, Korat, Morchadi, Sondabi and Chikhli.

== Sources ==
- Government of Maharashtra: Working Plan for Pusad Forest Division, Yavatmal Forest Circle, for the Period 2008-2009 to 2017-2018 vol 1, by Dr Dinesh Kumar Tyagi, I.F.S., and G. Rama Krishna Rao, I.F.S., Conservator of Forests, 2007
- Biodiversity and Its Conservation in India, Sharad Singh Negi, Indus Publishing, 1993, pp. 236-237
- Handbook of National Parks, Wildlife Sanctuaries and Biodiversity Reserves in India, Sharad Singh Negi, Indus Publishing, 2002, p. 137
- National Parks and Sanctuaries in Maharashtra: Individual Profile and Management Status, Pratibha Pande and Neema Pathak, Bombay Natural History Society 2005, pp. 264-266
- Renewable Energy and Environment, Prof Sagar Sankpal 2014, RUT, pp. 116-118
- "Karhandla and Tipeshwar can't be tiger reserves?" in Times of India, 19 Oct 2016, Vijay Pinjarkar
