= Adan River =

Adan
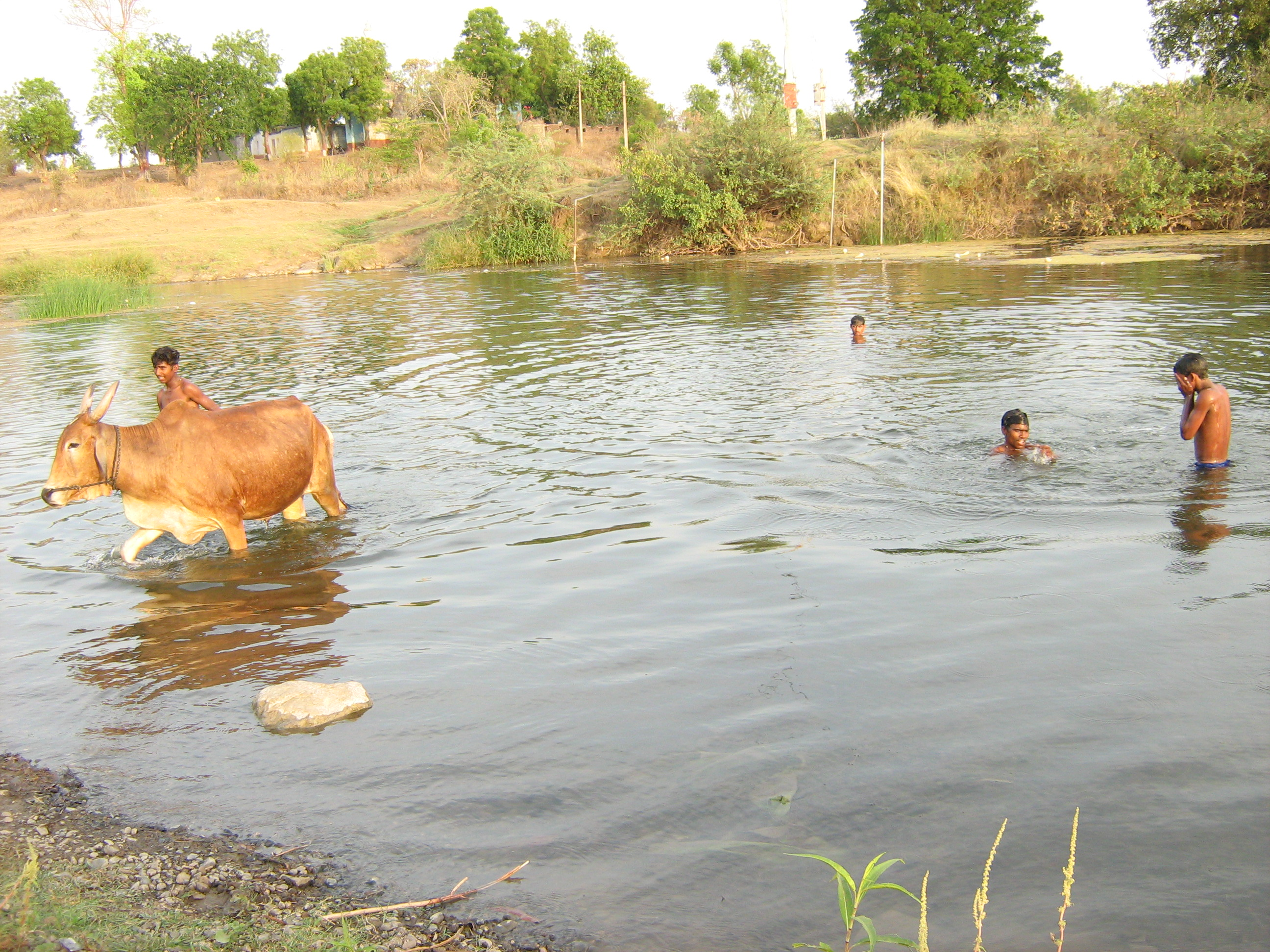
- Adan River

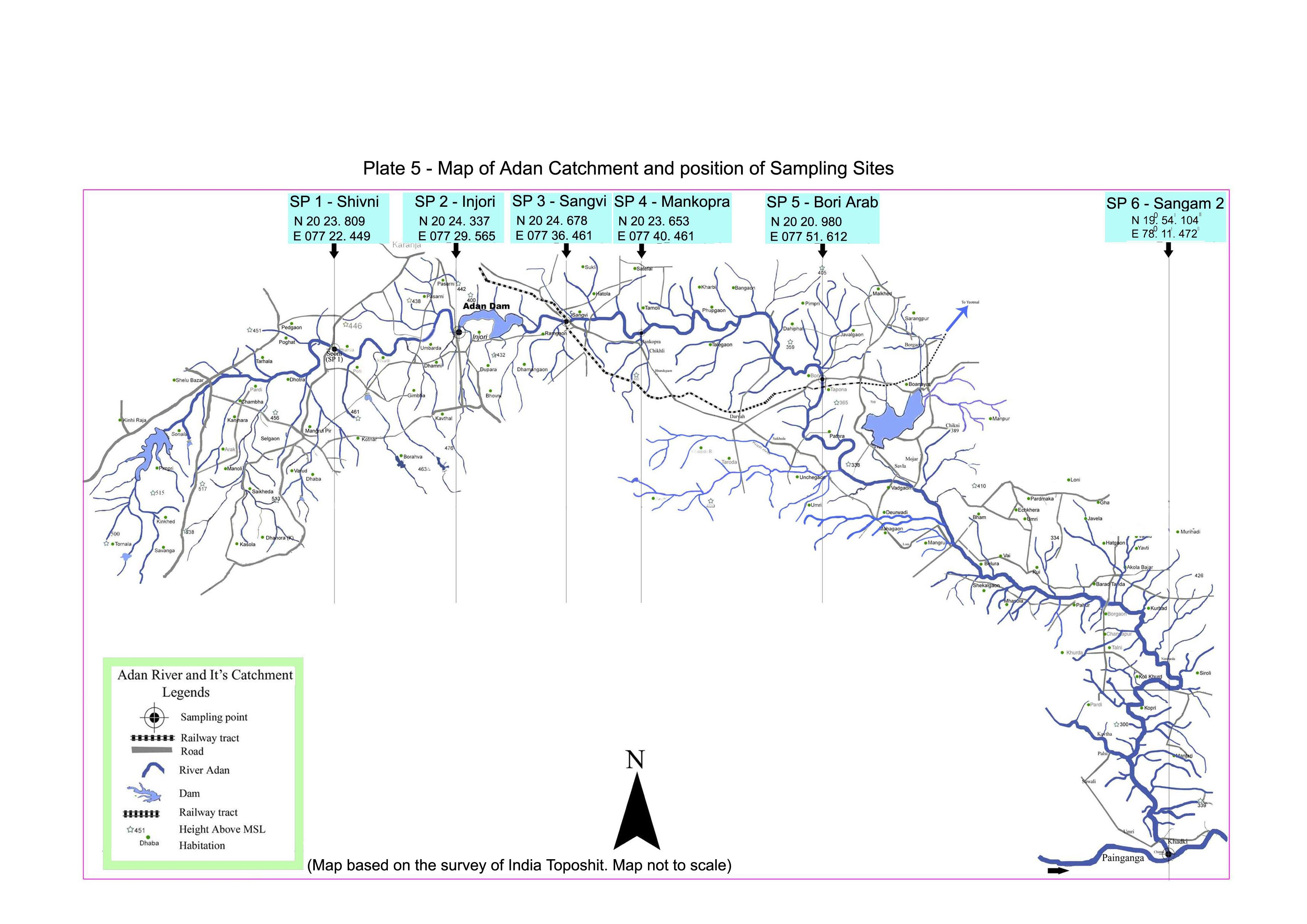
- Native name: अडाण (Marathi)

Location
- Country: India
- State: Maharashtra
- District: Washim district
- City: Karanja Lad

Physical characteristics
- Source: Pandaw Umara, Washim district
  - location: Maharashtra, India
- Length: 209.21 km (130.00 mi)
- Discharge
  - location: mouth

Basin features
- Tributaries
  - left: Arunawati River

The Adan River (Marathi: अडाण नदी) is a river in Washim District, Maharashtra, India and a principal tributary of the Painganga River.

== Geography ==
The source of the Adan River is in the Washim district of Maharashtra. The Arunavati River meets the Adan River about 13 kilometres before it joins the Painganga River. The river dries up in the summer, leaving only pools towards the end of its course.

Two dams have been built on the Adan; one at its origin near Sonala village and the other near Karanja Lad city, both in Washim District. The river then flows shrubland.

Adan Dam was built in 1977 near Karanja Lad, Washim district around 13 km from where the Adan River meets the Painanga.

== Environmental Impact of the Adan Dam ==
In two separate reports on the environmental impact of the Adan Dam on the aquatic biodiversity of the river and the surrounding fishing communities in 2008 and 2012, Dr Nilesh K. Heda reported the following effects:

- Effect on Fishing Communities: The new reservoir has led to large areas of the river becoming inaccessible to local anglers who cannot fish for most of the year due to the low water level. The construction of the dam has led to high levels of siltation and hydrophyte growth. These changes have led to the local Bhoi people having to rely less on their more sustainable, traditional fishing techniques.
- Effect on Aquatic Ecosystem: The diversity and abundance of fish has declined since the construction of the dam. Some species of fish have been completely wiped out from the area of the river about the dam (namely eutropiichthys vacha, anguilla bengalensis bengalensis, barilius species, tor khudree, tor mussullah, and gonoproktopterus kolus). Heda reports that local elders noticed that, as well as fish species, otters and tortoises had also been wiped out.

== Fish of Adan River ==
Adan river near the town of Injori, Maharashtra, India

The following species were found to be present in the Adan river by Dr Nilesh Heda:

- Acanthocobitis moreh
- Amblypharyngodon mola
- Anguilla bengalensis bengalensis
- Barilius bendelisis
- Other barilius species
- Chanda nama
- Channa orientalis
- Channa punctatus
- Channa striatus
- Cirrhinus fulungee
- Danio aequipinnatus
- Other danio species
- Garra mullya
- Glossogobius giuris
- Gonoproktopterus kolus
- Labeo rohita
- Lepidocephalus thermalis
- Macrognathus aral
- Mastacembelus armatus
- Mystus bleekeri
- Mystus cavasius
- Other mystus species
- Nemacheilus species
- Notopterus notopterus
- Ompok bimaculatus
- Oreochromis mossambica
- Oreonectes evezardi
- Osteobrama cotio peninsularis
- Osteobrama vigorsii
- Parambassis ranga
- Puntius amphibius
- Puntius sarana sarana
- Puntius sophore
- Other puntius species
- Puntius ticto
- Rasbora daniconius
- Rita species
- Salmostoma horai
- Salmostoma novacula
- Schistura denisoni denisoni
- Thynnichthys sandkhol
- Tor khudree
- Tor mussulah
- Tor tor
- Wallago attu
- Xenentodon cancila

== Local People ==
The local Bhoi people live in fishing communities on the banks of the river. The Bhoi are traditionally dependent upon the Adan for food and so their traditional way of life is at risk due to depleting fish resources.

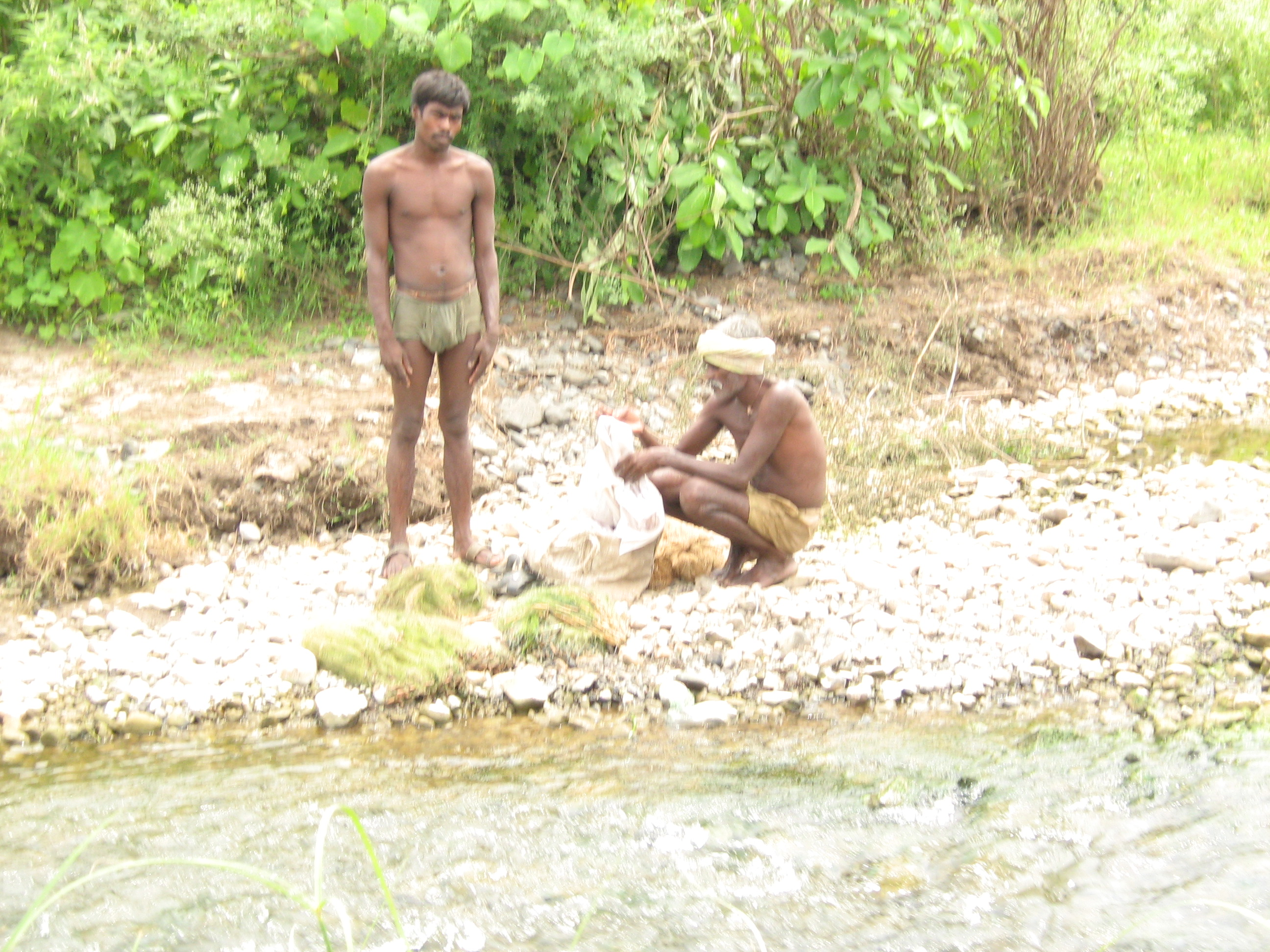
Bhoi people on the river Adan

== See also ==
- List of rivers of India
- Rivers of India
