= Painganga River =

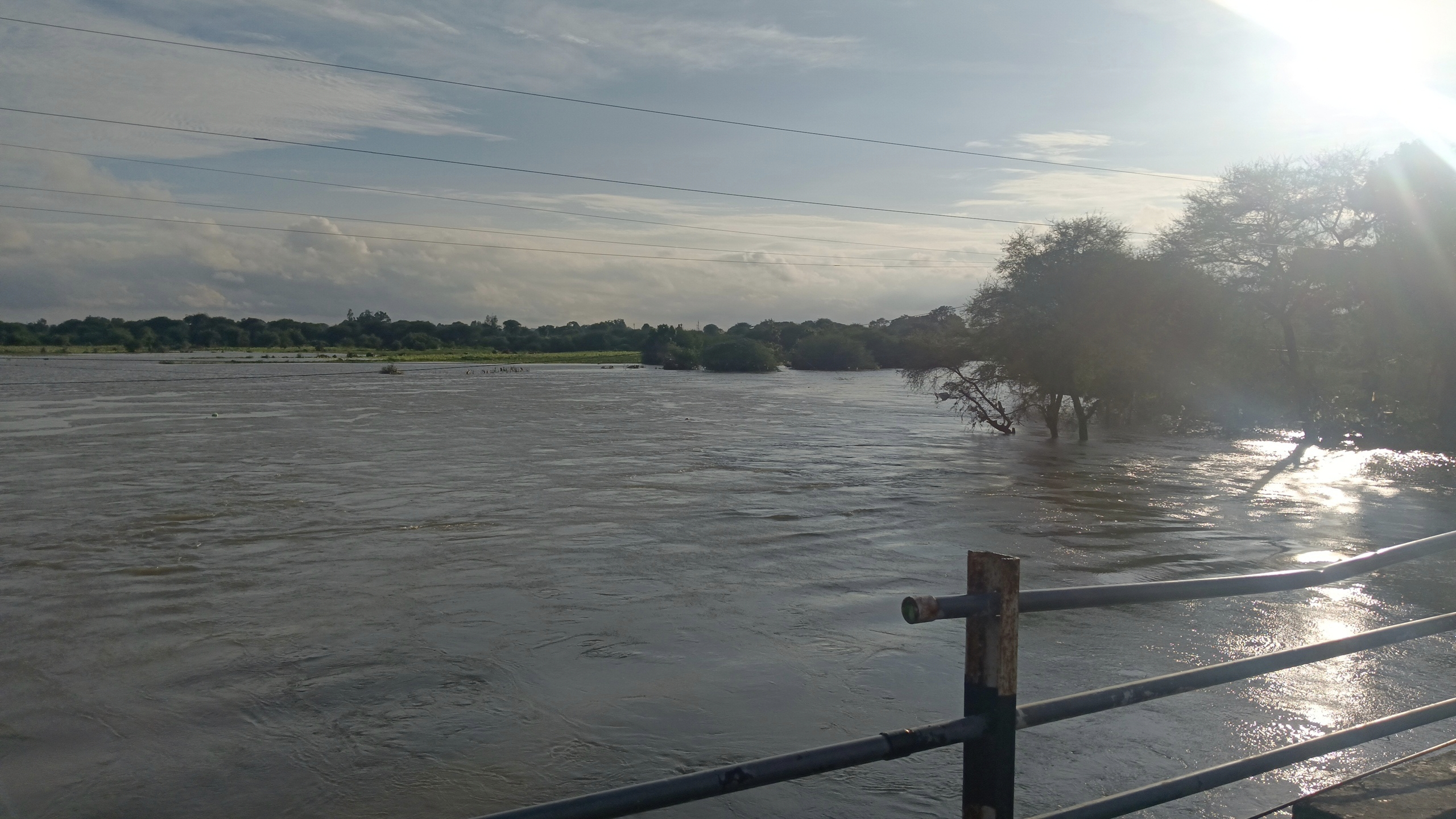
- Painganga River bridge at Mehkar during sunset (19 August 2025)

Location
- Country: India
- State: Maharashtra

Physical characteristics
- Source
  - location: Near Madh in the Ajantha ranges, Buldhana district, Maharashtra, India
- Mouth
  - location: Near Wadha village, Chandrapur taluka, Chandrapur district, Maharashtra, India
- Length: 495 km (308 mi)

Basin features
- Tributaries
  - left: Adan, Kas, Arunavati, Kayadhu, Pus Rivers

The Painganga River (also known as the Penganga River) is the chief river of the Buldhana district, Hingoli district, Nanded district, Yavatmal district, Chandrapur district and Washim district in the Maharashtra state in India. It flows along the southeast boundaries of the district in a winding, meandering course. It is deeply entrenched and difficult to navigate. It rises in the Ajantha range and is a major tributary of the Wardha River, the other major river in the district. It is also divided Marathwada and Vidarbha near Umarkhed and Himayatnagar.

There is a small railway station named after the river in the Washim district.

== River course ==
The total length of the river is 495 km (308 mi). The Painganga River originates Near Madh in the Ajantha ranges in Buldhana districtin Maharashtra. It then flows through Buldhana district and Washim district. It flows through Risod Tehsil of Washim where it gets Kas river as the tributary near Shelgaon Rajgure village and then flows through the border of Washim and Hingoli district. Then it acts as a boundary between Yavatmal district, Chandrapur district and Nanded district of Maharashtra. It then flows along the state border between Maharashtra and Telangana. It converges with Pus river near Mahur in Nanded. The small Vidarbha river merged with Painganga river. Near old Sangameshwar Temple at village Deurwada near Wani Taluka of Yavatamal district and Kodsi bujruk village in Korpana taluka of Chandrapur district. There is an old Lord Shiva temple at Jugad near Wani city of Yavatmal the river converges as an island. Every year at Guru Purnima in the November month, devotees from other places visit for worship. Penganga converges into Wardha River near a small village called Wadha in Chandrapur taluka of Chandrapur district.

Wardha River flows into Pranhita River which in turn flows in to Godavari River, which finally ends into the Bay of Bengal just east of Rajahmundry in the state of Andhra Pradesh.

== Tributaries ==
The Penganga River's tributaries include the Adan, Kas, Arunavati, Kayadhu, and Pus Rivers.

== Irrigation ==
The river provides the irrigation to the Washim and Yavatmal districts in Maharashtra. There are two dams being constructed on the river, namely Upper Painganga Dam and Lower Painganga Dam. The Upper Painganga Dam dam is also known as Isapur Dam. This dam is administered by the 'Pusad' taluka. Nearby talukas are Kalamnuri, Pusad, Umarkhed and Hadgaon. Its tributary "Pus river" has Upper Pus Dam near Pusad town built in 1971, and Upper Pus Dam near Mahagaon built in 1983.

The Penganga River gets flooded in rainy and winter season and partially flooded in summer. There is a proposal of making a large dam on the Painganga River.

== See also ==
- Sahatrakund Waterfall
