= Sant Gadge Baba Amravati University =

Public state university in Maharashtra, India

- Amravati University
- Motto: Education for Salvation of Soul
- Type: Public
- Established: 1983 (43 years ago)
- Affiliations: UGC
- Chancellor: Governor of Maharashtra
- Vice-Chancellor: Dr. Milind A. Barhate
- Students: More than 300000
- Location: Amravati, Maharashtra, India; 20°56′22″N 77°48′02″E
- Campus: 480 acres; Urban
- Current Exam: Summer 2024
- Nickname: SGBAU
- Website: www.sgbau.ac.in

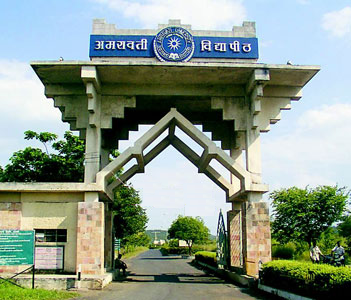
Sant Gadge Baba Amravati University

Sant Gadge Baba Amravati University (SGBAU), formerly Amravati University, named after Sant Gadge Baba, is a public state university located at Amravati in the Vidarbha region of the state of Maharashtra, India. Today, it is one of the largest universities in the country with 382 affiliated colleges and about 3.5 lakh students.

== History ==
The university was established on 1 May 1983 through the partitioning of Nagpur University.

The university campus is spread over an area of 225 hectares, and the university is home to 20 post-graduate departments offering 25 courses in different disciplines.

It has jurisdiction over five districts of Maharashtra: Akola, Amravati, Buldhana, Washim and Yavatmal.

== Affiliations ==
Amravati University is recognized under Section 12(B) of the University Grants Commission (UGC) Act of the Ministry of Education, Government of India. The University received NAAC accreditation in 2002. 127 colleges are affiliated with Amravati University, with an enrollment of over 90,000 students for the undergraduate and graduate courses, together, in different faculties.

Amravati University is an associate member of the Association of Commonwealth Universities, London.

== Vice Chancellors ==
- Dr. Vikas S. Sapkal (2016-2016)
- Dr. Murlidhar Chandekar (2016-2021)
- Dr. Dileep N Malkhede (2021-2023)
- Dr. Milind Barhate (2024-Present)

== Affiliated Colleges ==
- Shri Shivaji Science College, Amravati
- Government College of Engineering, Amravati
- Pankaj Laddad Institute of Technology, Buldhana
- Sipna College of Engineering & Technology, Amravati
- Dr. Rajendra Gode Institute of Technology and Research, Amravati (IBSS)
- Prof. Ram Meghe Institute of Technology & Research, Badnera - Amravati
- Babasaheb Naik College of Engineering, Pusad
- Shivaji Engineering College, Akola
- Anuradha Engineering College, Chikhli
- Prof. Ram Meghe College Of Engineering & Management, Badnera - Amravati
- P. R. Patil College of Engineering
- G. H. Raisoni College of Engineering & Management
- Hanuman Vyayam Prasarak Mandal's College of Engineering and Technology, Amravati
- Shri Sant Gajanan Maharaj College of Engineering, Shegaon
- Model Degree College of Arts, Science and Commerce, Buldhana
- The College of Animation Bio-Engineering & Research Centre, Amravati
- G. S. Arts, Science and Commerce college, Khamgaon, Buldhana
