= Penumarti Viswanatha Sastry =

Penumarti Viswanatha Sastry (2 May 1929 – 25 December 1998), also known as "Ajanta", was a Telugu writer and editor.

== Life ==
He was born in Kesanakurru village in West Godavari district. After primary education at Narsapuram, he graduated and worked in different magazines in Hyderabad and Chennai. He has worked as Chief Sub-editor of Andhra Prabha daily magazine in Vijayawada. He followed in the line of Srirangam Srinivasa Rao.

He won the Sahitya Akademi Award for his Telugu-language poetic work "Swapna Lipi" in 1997.
