= Sahasrakund Waterfall =

River waterfall in Western India

Sahastrakund Waterfall
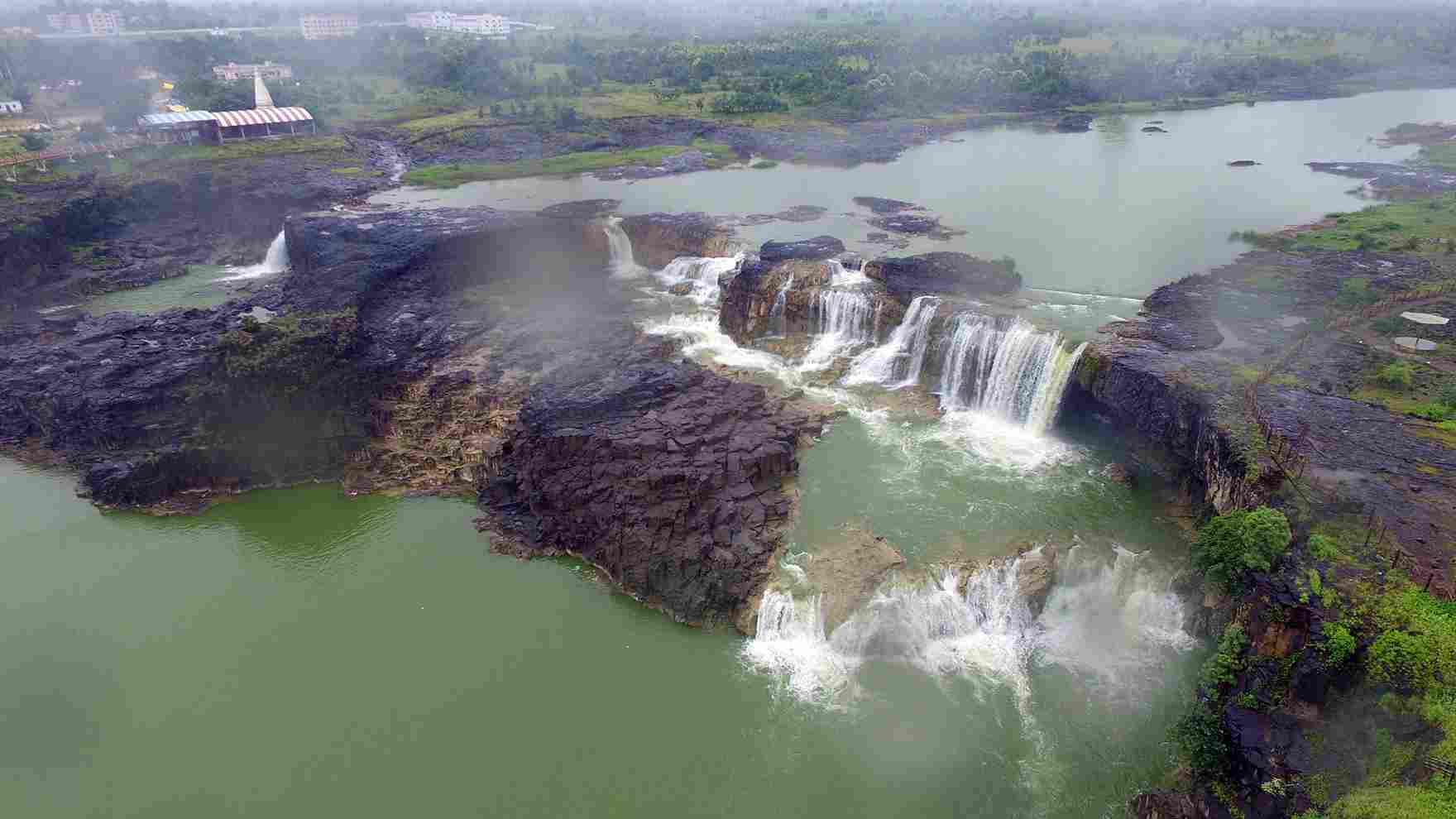
- Interactive map of Sahastrakund Waterfall
- Location: Sahastrakund, Islapur, Maharashtra, India
- Coordinates: 19.2708°N 78.0020°E

Sahasrakund Waterfall (also Sahastrakund) is a waterfall on the Painganga River of Nanded district, Maharashtra, India. This town is on the boundary of the Yavatmal and Nanded districts on the Painganga River.

Sahasrakund situated at a distance 172 km from Yavatmal and 100 km from Nanded. It is also 50 km from Nirmal and 100 km from Adilabad.from Himayatnagar 18 Km only.

== Attractions ==
Along with natural scenery, the waterfall is also known for temples around it. Following are the temple around Waterfall:

1. Panchamukhi Mahadev Temple
2. Ram temple
3. Banganga Mahadev Temple

It is considered as important tourist attraction in rainy season. Waterfall is also known for its rock pattern which looks like black metal.

== Note ==
Sahasra is the correct prefix that means "a thousand", not SahasTra. However, it is invariably misspelled as the latter. Notice how the same prefix is spelled when referring to the crown chakra: "Sahasrara Chakra" or when it occurs in family names (example: Sahasrabuddhe) without a T. Also see Sahasralinga. The confusion arises because the Devanagari letter "Sa" (स) merges with "ra" (र) and looks like "tra".

== See also ==
- List of waterfalls
- List of waterfalls of India
