= Wathod Reservoir =

Reservoir in India

Wathod Reservoir is a reservoir within the Manora town, Washim district, Maharashtra, India. The reservoir is about 5.9 kilometres (3.7 mi) from Manora town in the north.

The length of the dam is 290 metres (950 ft) while the height of the dam above lowest foundation is 16.6 metres (54 ft). Maximum storage capacity is 1.98 million cubic meters (MCM). Live storage capacity is 1.7 MCM. Wathod Lake is also a tourist attraction and has varied flora and fauna. The water is turbid in rainy session while clear and transparent in summer.

Wathod Reservoir's physical and chemical parameters were all evaluated by scientists in 2014, and the results of their work show that the reservoir is still safe to use for drinking water.

== History ==
Wathod reservoir was constructed as part of irrigation projects by the Government of Maharashtra in 1974.
