= Darwha Motibagh railway station =

Railway station in India

Darwha Moti Bagh railway station

General information
- Location: State Highway 212, Darwha, Maharashtra; India
- Coordinates: 20.3213°N 77.7684°E
- Elevation: 348 metres (1,142 ft)
- System: Indian Railways
- Owner: Indian Railways
- Operator: Central Railway
- Platforms: 1
- Tracks: 0

Construction
- Parking: No
- Cycle facilities: Yes

Other information
- Status: Active
- Station code: DWM
- Zone(s): Central Railway
- Division(s): Bhusawal

History
- Opened: 1912
- Former names: Great Indian Peninsula Railway
Location
- Location within India Location within Maharashtra

Darwha Moti Bagh railway station is a small railway station in Yavatmal district in the Indian state of Maharashtra. Its code is DWM. It serves Darwha city. The station consists of one platform. The platform is not well sheltered. It lacks many facilities including water and sanitation.

Historic Shakuntala Express used to runs starts from this station. Shakuntala Express was founded by the British government when they ruled India. Due to its age, it has gained historical importance. This station will become junction when Wardha–Nanded line will join Shakuntala Railway.

== Trains ==
- Shakuntala Express
