= Adan Dam =

Dam in Maharashtra, India

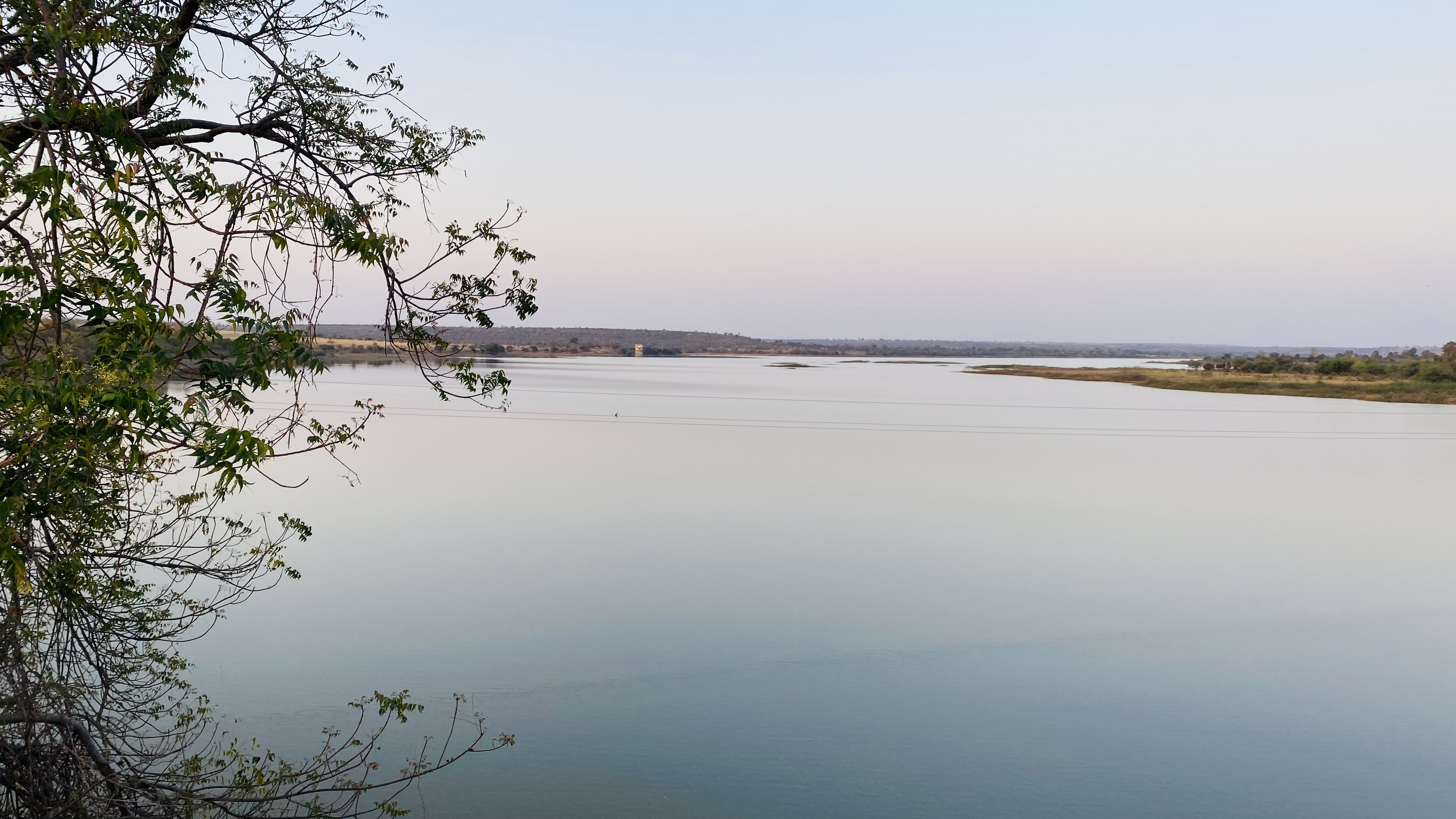

- Location within Maharashtra
- Official name: Adan Dam
- Location: Karanja
- Coordinates: 20°25′17.55″N 77°33′47.07″E
- Opening date: 1977
- Owners: Government of Maharashtra, India

Dam and spillways
- Type of dam: Earthfill; Rockfill
- Impounds: Aran river
- Height: 30.13 m (98.9 ft)
- Length: 755 m (2,477 ft)
- Dam volume: 1,428 km^{3} (343 cu mi)

Reservoir
- Total capacity: 67,250 km^{3} (16,130 cu mi)
- Surface area: 10,520 km^{2} (4,060 sq mi)

Adan Dam, is an earthfill and rockfill dam on Aran river near Karanja, Washim district in state of Maharashtra in India.

== Specifications ==
The height of the dam above lowest foundation is 30.13 m (98.9 ft) while the length is 755 m (2,477 ft). The volume content is 1,428 km^{3} (343 cu mi) and gross storage capacity is 78,320.00 km^{3} (18,789.97 cu mi).

== Purpose ==
- Irrigation

== See also ==
- Dams in Maharashtra
- List of reservoirs and dams in India
