= Akola Airport =

Airport in Maharashtra, India

- IATA: AKD; ICAO: VAAK

Summary
- Airport type: Public
- Owner: Government of Maharashtra
- Operator: Airports Authority of India
- Serves: Akola
- Location: Akola, Maharashtra, India
- Built: 1943
- Elevation AMSL: 999 ft / 304 m
- Coordinates: 20°41′56″N 077°03′31″E

Map

Runways
Direction	Length		Surface
Direction	ft	m	Surface
10/28	4,600	1,400	part concrete, part asphalt or part bitumen-bound macadam

Akola Airport (IATA: AKD, ICAO: VAAK) is an airport located in Akola in the Indian state of Maharashtra. The airport can currently said to be non-functional for public use, as of now no public airplane services are available in Akola. It is natively called Dr. Panjabrao Deshmukh Domestic Airport, named after the first State Agriculture Minister of India.

== History ==
The airport was constructed in 1943 by the Public Works Department. Airlines such as Vayudoot and Span Aviation had operated out of Akola in the past. The airport was developed in 2008 at an estimated cost of Rs 25 crore. A new terminal building, renovated at a cost of Rs 1.5 crore, has a new fire station, air traffic control block and other vital installations. The 4,000-foot runway was extended to 4,600 feet (1,400 m) and a new precision approach path indicator and non-directional beacon navigation system added.

== Structure ==
Akola airport has a part concrete, part asphalt, or part bitumen-bound macadam runway oriented 10/28, 4000 ft long and 100 ft wide. The airport covers an area of 196 acres (79 ha). The 90-metre by 100-metre apron can accommodate two Fokker F27 - sized aircraft. The Airports Authority of India (AAI) has requested the State government provide additional land in order to extend the runway to 1,800 metres (5,900 ft) to enable larger aircraft to use the airport.

== See also ==
- Amravati Airport
