= Major irrigation project =

Irrigation project classification in India

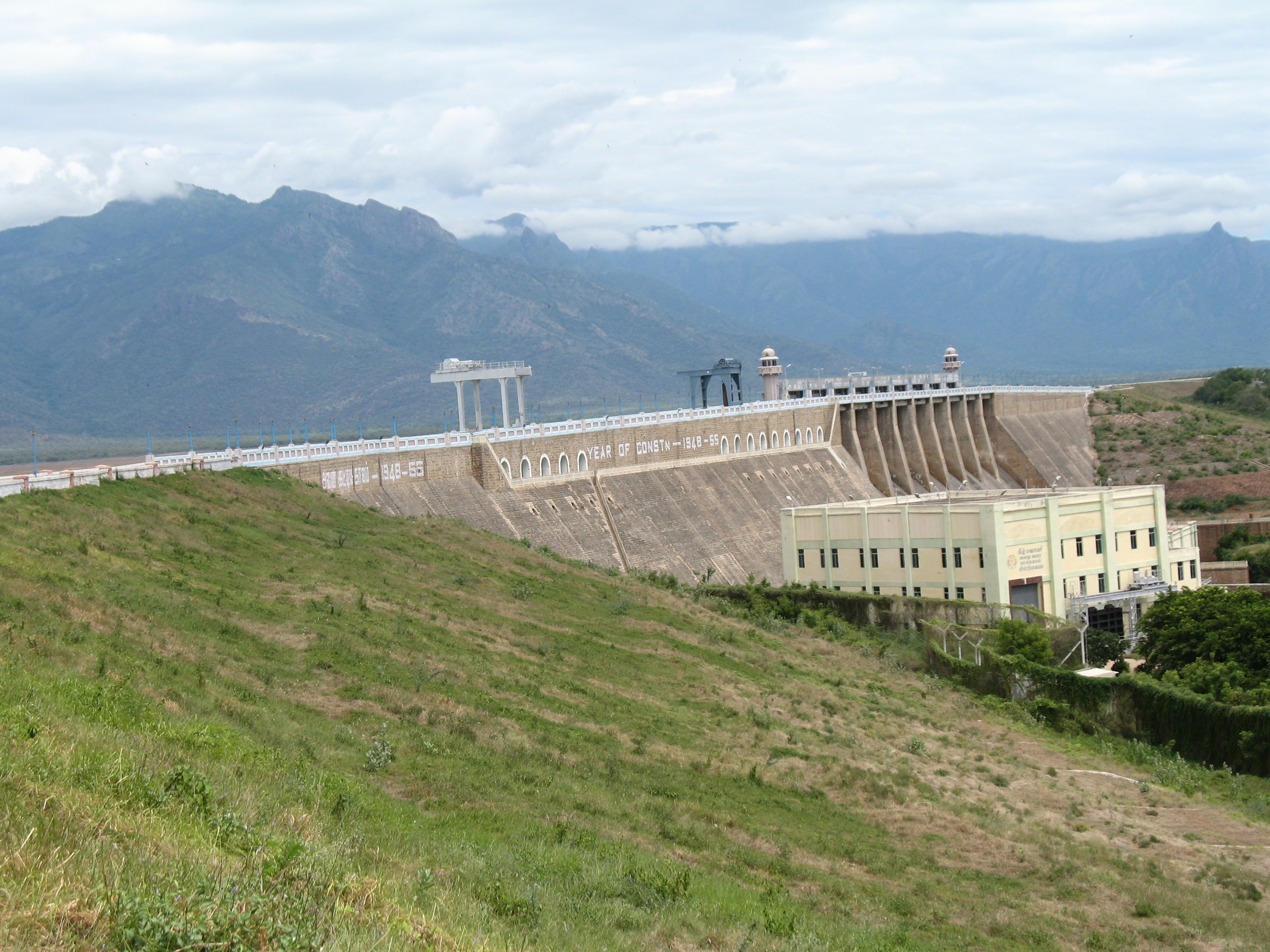
The Bhavanisagar Dam in Tamil Nadu is an example of a major irrigation project

Major irrigation project is a classification of irrigation projects used in India. A project with a cultivable command area of more than 10,000 hectares is classified as a major irrigation project. Before the Fifth Five-Year Plan, irrigation schemes were classified on the basis of investments needed to implement the scheme. Since the Fifth Five-Year Plan, India has adopted the command area-based system of classification.Sarda Canal in Sitapur and Upper Yamuna Canal in Mathura were utilised for their full potential by regular maintenance in Uttar Pradesh.
