= Murray Leaf =

American anthropologist

Murray John Leaf (born June 1, 1939) is an American social and cultural anthropologist.

== Education ==
He was born in New York City in 1939, and grew up in Tucson, Arizona. After active duty for training in the United States Army Reserves in 1957, he attended the University of Arizona and Reed College, receiving a B.A. in philosophy from Reed in 1961. He received a Ph.D. in Social Anthropology from the University of Chicago in 1966. He has taught at Pomona College, the University of California, Los Angeles, and the University of Texas at Dallas.

== Career ==
In practical development work, Leaf has served as Senior Social Scientist on the Irrigation and Water Management and Training Project, in India (1987–89), Senior Socio-Economist for the Bangladesh Flood Response Study (1990–93), and as a consultant to the United Nations Centre for Regional Development, Nagoya, Japan (1991–95).

He has served on the editorial board of Regional Development Dialogue, the journal of the United Nations Centre for Regional Development, and the online anthropological journal Mathematical Anthropology and Cultural Theory. He has held elected positions in the Culture and Agriculture section of the American Anthropological Association and the Society for Anthropological Sciences.

== Contributions ==
Leaf's central concern is the social nature of thought and its relation to organization. Methodologically, his argument is for radical empiricism in opposition to positivism, Marxism, interpretivism, and postmodernism.

Major contributions fall into four areas:

1. South Asian Studies, where he is primarily identified with studies of social organization, the Green Revolution, and Indian religion, especially Sikhism. Notable positions include rejecting scholarly claims for an all-encompassing “caste system” and social determinism and arguing for organizational pluralism and individual instrumental rationality.
2. History of anthropological theory, in which he was the first writer to discuss the topic in terms of long-standing philosophical and epistemological conflicts. Previously, the convention had been to write as though the field developed simply as an accumulation of “discoveries.” Leaf described the conflict as between monism and dualism, with the former represented in modern philosophy and epistemology by Skepticism and Pragmatism, and the latter by the various forms of idealism and materialism—including positivism and Marxism. Although subsequent writers have emphasized different issues, explicit discussion of philosophical and epistemological assumptions has now become common. He was also the first modern writer to call attention to the roots of anthropological theory in legal theory.
3. General social theory, in which in the post-war period he was the second writer, after Fred Bailey, to explicitly repudiate the conception that the task of social analysis was to show the underlying unity of society or social structure. Leaf has argued consistently for organizational pluralism. In the sphere of culture, he has similarly argued that no community ever has a single unified system of ideas and values or “symbols and meanings,” at any level. There are always multiple, independent and often mutually opposed, cultural idea-systems. With Dwight Read, Michael Fischer, Douglas R. White, and others he has contributed to the development of methods for eliciting and describing such systems with previously unattained clarity and verifiability. These include the ideas that define kinship, religion, government, local organizations, and productive organizations. The theoretical effort includes developing a more general statement of Shannon and Weaver's A Mathematical Theory of Communication.
4. In development studies, he has been among a group of development specialists primarily drawn from anthropology, geography, and sociology, who have argued for the orientation that Michael Cernea and Robert Chambers have described s “putting people first.” Others have described it under the heading of promoting “people’s participation” in project design and management. The orientation rejects both dirigiste central planning and laissez-faire neo-liberalism, with their respective theoretical justifications.

== Works ==
Books

1. Information and Behavior in a Sikh Village (1972)
2. Frontiers of Anthropology (with B. F. Campbell, C. Cronin, G. DeVos, W. A. Longacre, M. McClaran, F. T. Plog, J. H. Prost, and R. Wagner). (1974)
3. Man, Mind, and Science: A History of Anthropology (1979)
4. Song of Hope: The Green Revolution in a Panjab Village (1984)
5. Pragmatism and Development: The Prospect for Pluralism in the Third World (1998)

Notable articles and book chapters

1. 1971: "Baking and Roasting: A Compact Demonstration of a Cultural Code", American Anthropologist
2. 1971: "The Punjabi Kinship Terminology as a Semantic System", American Anthropologist
3. 1983: "The Green Revolution and Cultural Change in a Panjab Village, 1965–1978", Economic Development and Cultural Change
4. 1985: "The Punjab Crisis", Asian Survey
5. 1992: "Irrigation and Authority in Rajasthan", Ethnology
6. 2003: "Ethnography and Pragmatism", Renascent Pragmatism, ed. Alfredo Morales
7. 2003: "Pragmatic Legal Norms", Renascent Pragmatism, ed. Alfredo Morales
8. 2004: "What is 'Formal' Analysis?", Cybernetics and Systems: An International Journal
9. 2005: "The Message Is the Medium: Language, Culture and Informatics", Cybernetics and Systems: An International Journal
10. 2005: "Romanticism, Meaning, and Science", Language, Culture and the Individual: A Tribute to Paul Friedrich, ed. Catherine O'Neil, Mary Scoggin, and Kevin Tuite
