= Arunavati River =

India River

- Location within Maharashtra Location within India

Physical characteristics
- Mouth
  - coordinates: 21.3309103°N 74.8073041°E

Arunavati river is a seasonal right-bank tributary of the Tapi river in India. It originates and flows from the Sangvi village and merges into the Tapi river near Uparpind village in Shirpur tehsil. The river flows mostly in monsoon. There are many dams on this river including the Arunawati Dam.

== See also ==
- Painganga River
- Manora, Washim
- Wathod Reservoir
