= Mahur, Maharashtra =

Mahur
- town
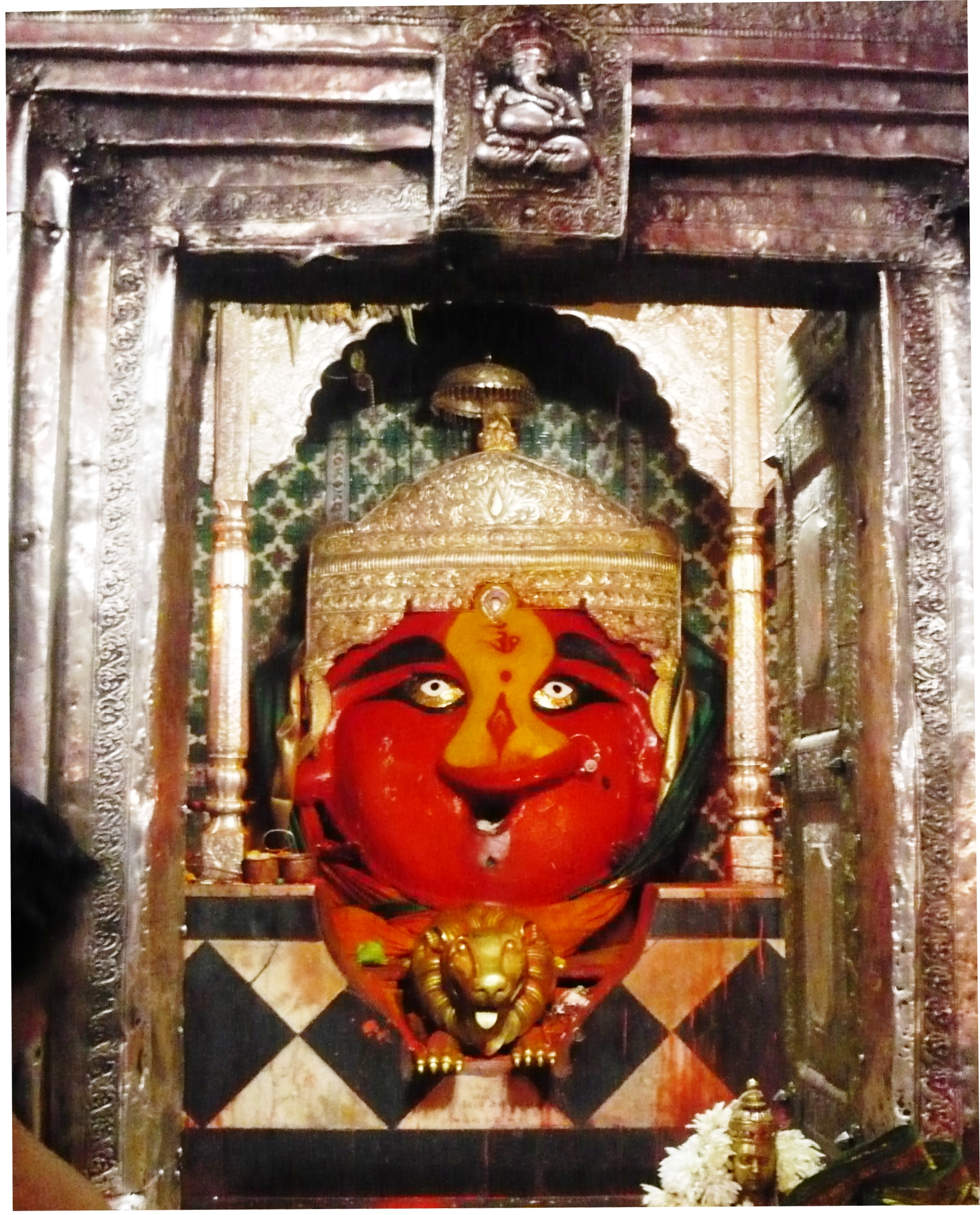
- Idol of Renuka goddess in Mahur
- Nickname: Mahurgarh
- Location in Maharashtra
- Coordinates: 19°50′52″N 77°55′26″E
- Country: India
- State: Maharashtra
- District: Nanded
- Founder: Atri Rishi
- Named for: Mahurgarh

Government
  - Type: City Council
  - President: Shital Jadhav
- Demonym: Mahurkar

Languages
  - Official: Marathi
- Time zone: UTC+5:30 (IST)
- Postal code: 431801
- Vehicle registration: MH-26
- Lok Sabha constituency: Hingoli
- Vidhan Sabha constituency: Kinwat
- Civic Agency: Mahurgad Nagar Panchayat

Mahur or Mahurgad is a town and religious place in Nanded district of Maharashtra, India. Mahur is the birthplace of Hindu God Dattatreya. Dattatreya parents Atri Rishi and Sati Anasuya Mata lived here. Brahmadev, Vishnudev and Lord Shiva once got a news about Anusaya Mata that there is no one more pious and pure as her. To test her piousness they arrived under the garb of asking Alm (bhiksha). Near Mahur, There is a Pious confluence of River Penganga and River Pus at Hiwara Sangam village, Tal. Mahagaon Vidarbha, from where the river flows northward. Penganga river forms a border between Vidarbha and Marathwada. Mahur falls just about 3km inside Marathwada due to river banks.

There are three mountains in Mahur. The first one is having Renuka Mahur devi mata Temple, who is mother of the god Parshuram. Other two are called Datta Shikhar and Atri Anasuya Shikar Temples. Datta Shikhar is highest of all. Mahur has a sacred temple to Renuka Mata, which is considered one of the three and half Shakta pithas (temples) in the state. A big fair is held here every year on the occasion of Vijayadashami.

Sahasrarjun attacked Renuka Mahur Devi while somewhere in today's Telangana, for he wanted to grab the sacred Kamdhenu cow — this cow has the divine power to fulfill wishes. When Renuka Mahur Devi refused to him that saying asking gift of your own choice by the guest visitor is uncalled. He attacked her & injured her. She dies in this & when Lord Parshuram knew about it, he went berserk. Then the elderly people pacified him & asked him to do the last rites in Mahur under Dattatreya's guidance. Then he was told by him that Mahur devi Renuka Mata will appear on first mountain for you to worship. This became the famous Mahur Devi Renuka Mata temple. The "Matru Tirth" (means sacred place for Mother's worship) Place on this Mountain is the one which is where today stands a lake, is "Antyeshti Sthan" (Means place where last rites were performed).

There are many other temples in Mahur like Rishi Jamdagni Mahur Temple, Lord Parshuram Mahur Temple, Kalika Mata Temple, Devdevshwar Temple, and also the Caves called Pandav Leni.

Near to mahur one of the historical and beautiful, natural place known as Hazrat Fariduddin Ganjeshakkar Dargah.It is in a cave under the waterfall.

There is a fort named Mahur Fort in Mahur.

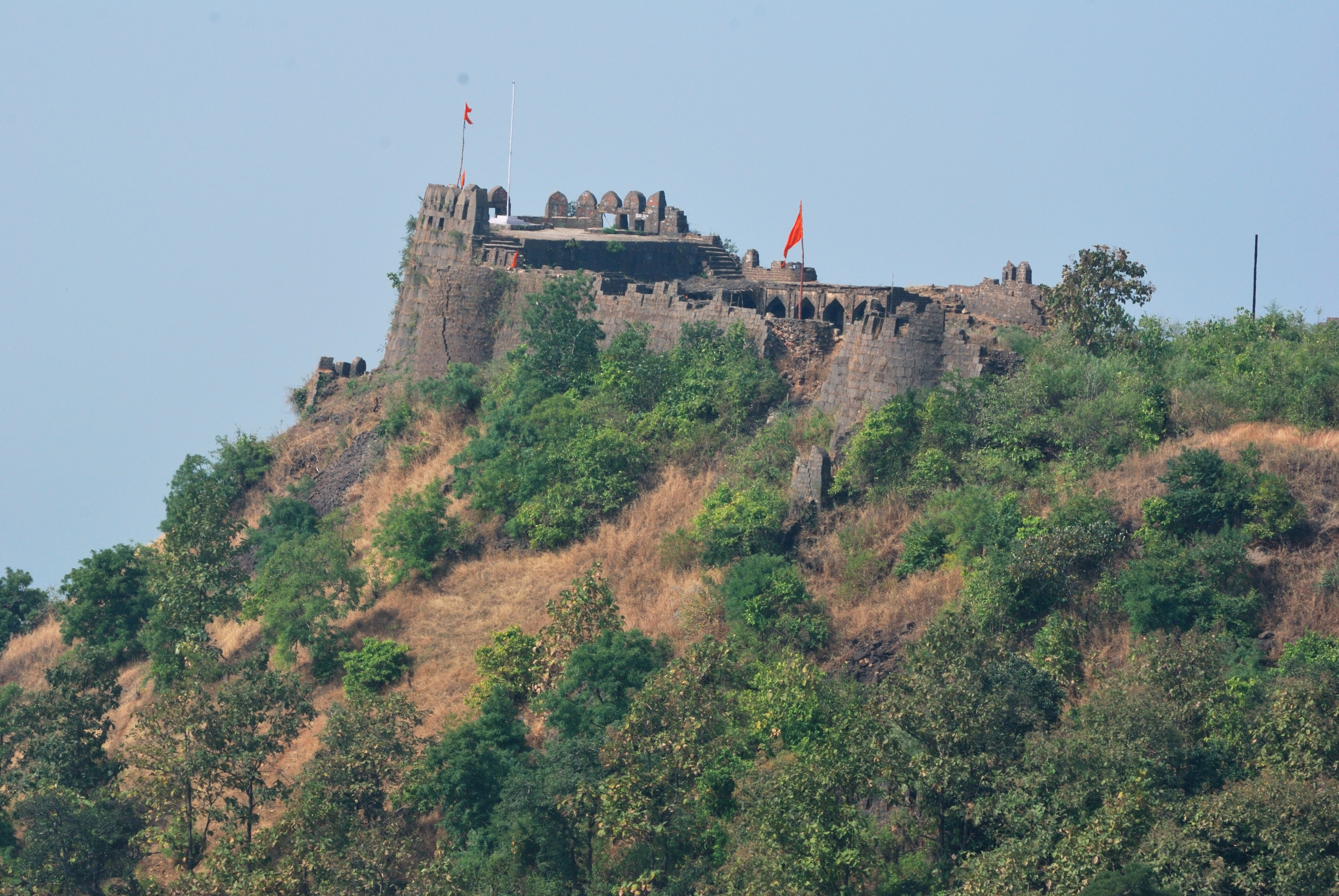
Ramparts of the spacious fort of Mahur

This was built Khandkya Ballal Shah by Gond kingdom of Chandrapur. This fort is quite large, but very few visitors travel inside.

== History ==
Mahur finds mention in the ancient Devi Bhagawatam as "Matripura" or "Matapur", where it is mention as one of the famous pilgrimages. In Devi Gita the final and most important chapter of the text, it is mentioned as one of the important places of Shakti worship:

"Devi spoke:... I am now telling something out of My affection to My Bhaktas... Matripura or "Matapur" in the Sahyadri mountain; here the Devi Renuka or Matapur Niwasini Jagdamba Devi dwells..."

Appasaheb Deshmukh was the ruler of Mahur sarkar and the sardar of gond King in the 12th century CE. Bharat Ratn Nanaji Deshmukh was his descendant.

The temple and the glory of Goddess Renuka or Renuka Mata has been sung really well by a few of her famous devottes like Kavi Vishnudas, and Tanhaji Deshmukh. The two of the famous Aartis sung till date, i.e., "Jai Jai Jagadambe" and "Lo Lo Lagla Ambecha" are written by these devotees respectively. Sant Vishnudas Kavi later took his samadhi in Mahur City itself. It is also a famous shrine to visit. And, Sant Tanhaji Deshmukh's Samadhi can be found at Matsyodari Temple, Ambad, Jalna.

=== Raje Udaram Deshmukh of Mahur ===
Raje Uddhavji Ramji alias Raja Udaram, a Deshastha Rigvedi Brahmin from Washim was the Jagirdar of Mahur. He was initially a sardar in Nizamshahi Kingdom along with Sardar Lakhuji Jadhavrao, father of Rajmata Jijau Saheb. In year 1616, both Lakhuji and Udaram deserted Malik Ambar to join Mughals. Maratha Sardars were desired by both sides for their light infantry and cavalry. Both Sardars changed sides according to their interests. Raje Udaram was a good friend of Sardar Raje Lakhuji Jadhavrao. He died in 1632 AD, on the foothills of Daulatabad fort. Later Pandita Sawitribai or Rai Bagan, his wife, was the ruler of Mahur. There is a story of her valour. After death of her husband Raje Udaram-Deshmukh of the Mahur in Varhad province, who was in Mughal services, she took sword and joined Mughal services. After her son Jagjivanrao's death she continued to manage her jagir along with her grandson, Baburao. She was maintaining the Jagirs in Berar province, viz., Mahur, Pusad, Washim, Malegaon, Umarkhed, etc. Aurangzeb entrusted this Mahur-queen with the responsibility to quell the rebellion of Sardar Herchandrai. Savitri thereupon readied herself for the encounter. Taking the army from the Mahur-hills she proceeded towards the warfield. She tied her choli (bodice) to the flag-pole and exhorted to the army: “I am marching on the army, making flag of choli. "You are, after all men! You ought to be more valorous than me! Fight with full might! Kill the enemy! Win the battle! Protect the honour of your sister!" this call by her really kindled fire in the minds of the soldiers and they fought relentlessly. She also personally fought with all her might and consequently Harchandrai was defeated. For her valour during the war of accession in 1658, she was given an honorary name Rai Bagan by Aurangzeb. The meaning of Rai Bagan is Royal Tigress.

She fought on side of Kartalab Khan in Battle of Umberkhind. She called Shivaji A Lion and advised Kartalab khan to surrender himself before Shivaji.

Raje Udaram was a title conferred by Shahajahan to the family. Hence, all the descendants of Udaram called themselves Raje Udaram. Peshwas, in early 18th century questioned the title. But later permission was given to use the title. In 1802, the Jahagirdari was divided into six sons. And each keeping the title called himself Raje Udaram Deshmukh.

For first three generations, Raje Udarams were the Killedars and faujdar of Mahur's Ramgad fort. They used to live on fort and rule over their territory. Last renovation of this fort was done by Raja Jagjeewanrao Udaram, son of Uddhavji Ramji. He also built the famous Hatti Darwaja of the fort, which was built like a Chini Mahal of Devgiri fort.

== The Renuka Devi Temple as a Shakti pitha ==
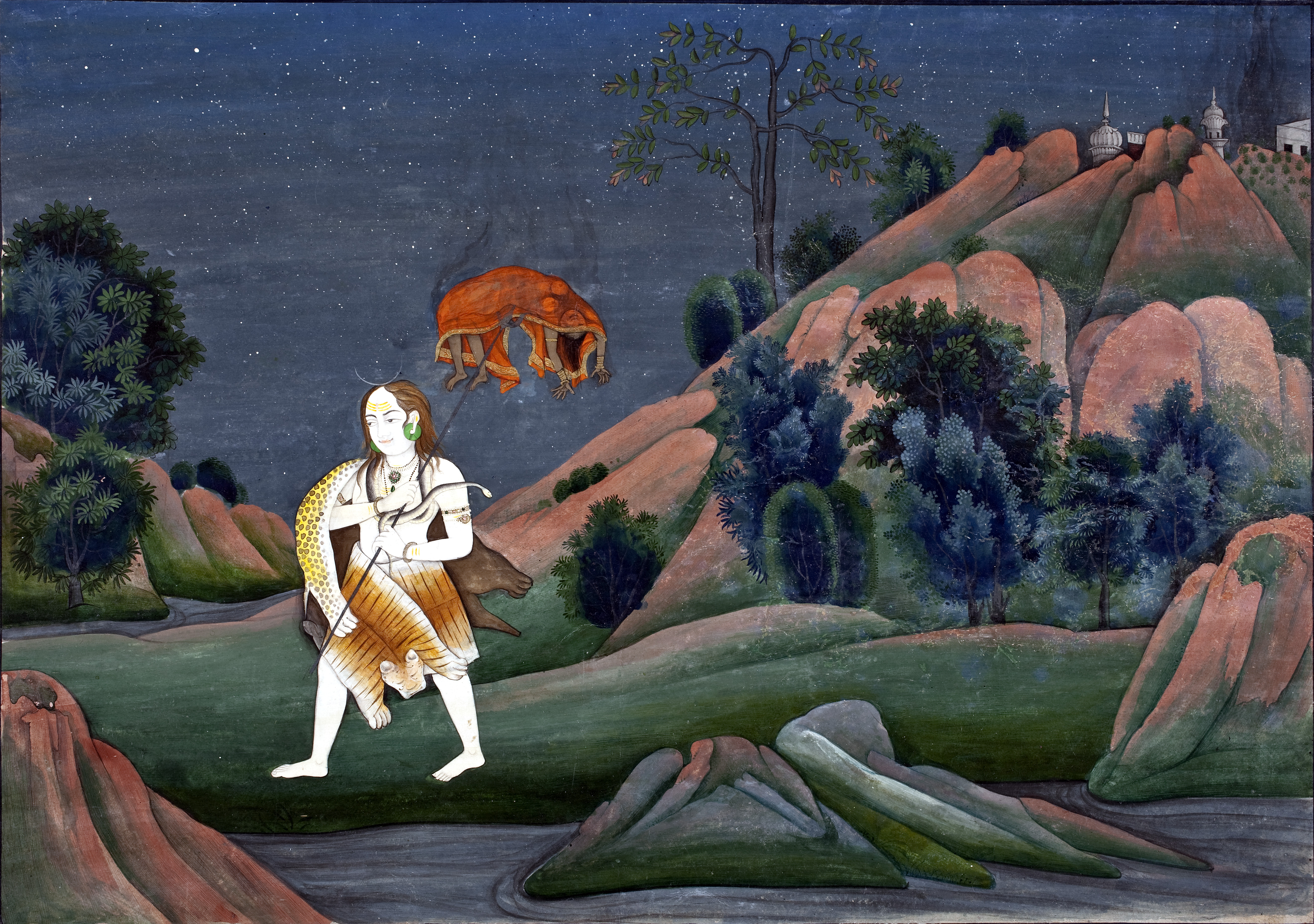
Shiva carrying the corpse of Sati Devi

The temple is considered as a revered shrine for the Shaktism sect, because of the above told mythology and also because the Shrine is a Shakta pitha. It is believed that Renuka Mata, (the wife of Sage Jamadagni) was decapitated by her own son Parashurama and her head fell here. Renuka was later given rebirth as a boon by Sage Jamadagni to his son Parashurama. The temple is considered as a Shakta pitha because of the mythology of Daksha yaga and Sati's self immolation.

Shakta pithas are Durga or Adiparashakti shrines that are believes to have enshrined with the presence of Shakti due to the falling of body parts of the corpse of Sati Devi, when Lord Shiva carried it and wandered. There are 51 Shakta pithas linking to the 51 alphabets in Sanskrit. The Shakti of Mahur is addressed as Renuka Devi. Most of the Shakta pithas are associated with a Kalabhairava shrine.

== Geography ==
All three important temples — Renuka Mata Temple, Lord Dattatreya Temple and Anusaya Mata Temple — are built on three mountain ranges. Mahur is surrounded by jungles rich with trees and wild life. There is teakwood trees everywhere. Peafowl, deer, black bears, panthers are very common in the jungle.

On one of the mountains is the ancient Mahurgad Fort constructed in the 12th century. Mahur was an important fort in ancient Berar history. It became a separate province in 1478 during the Bahmani Sultanate. It was one of the Sarkars (then district) with 20 parganas (towns) in Berar Subah (state) in Akbar's rule.

== Holy Attractions ==
The main attractions in Mahur are Matapur Niwasini Shri Jagdamba Devi Temple or Renuka Devi Temple, Lord Dattatreya Temple, Anusaya Mata Temple, Devdeveshwar Temple, Lord Parshuram Temple, Sarvatirtha, Matru-Tirtha, Bhanutirth, Hati darvaza, Bal samudra, Pandav Leni, Mahurgad Fort, Mahakali Temple (In the fort), Mahur Museum, Sonapir Dargah, Shaikh Farid Water fall (Wazara), Palace of Raje Udaram. Raje Udaram Deshmukh and later his brave wife RaiBagan (Royal Tigress) were the rulers of Mahur.

People who visit Mahur also visit Unkeshwar Hot Spring (90 km from Pusad; 50 km from Mahur; 15 km from Kinwat), which has natural sources of hot water. This sulphur-rich water is supposed to have medicinal value. The name Unkeshwar is because of Lord Unkeshwar (MAHADEV i.e. Shiva) temple and Aashram complex.

=== Devdeveshwar Temple ===
Devdeveshwari mandir belongs to Mahanbhav Panth, basically called a nidra sthan (sleeping place) of Jagat Guru Shree Dattatreya Prabhu. It is at elevated outskirt of Mahur town, 2 km from Mahur bus stand.

Daily Shree Dattatreya Prabhu will take nitya snan (daily bath) at meruwada talao (tank) in Mahur, bhiksha (the meal served to a sadhu or Indian monk) at Kolhapur, bhojan (lunch) at Panchaleshwar and get back to sleep in Devdeveshwar mandir Mahur (nidra sthan of God Dattatreya Prabhu). Jagat Guru Shree Dattatreya swami is a chiranjiv avtar (Immortal) so it is believed that even today Shree Dattatreya swami comes to sleep here.

== Travel facilities and Pilgrimage Amenities ==
There are Maharashtra state transport buses that go from Nagpur, Nanded, Kinwat, Yavatmal, Amravati, Akola and Pusad to Mahur. The nearest airport is Nanded airport which is connected to all the major cities of India. From Nanded, You can use private car or taxi to reach Mahurgad.

Visitors from Mumbai and Pune can reach Nanded by train & take a Bus, Private car or taxi from there. Frequent bus services are available from the Nanded bus stand.

Hadgaon also has bus and taxi transport going to Mahur. The only way to approach Mahur is by Road. There are frequent buses (State-run ST buses as well as private buses) from Nanded, Yavatmal and Pusad.

Accommodation facilities are available in Mahur city (7 km from the temple). All types of accommodation facilities are available like lodges, hotels, government rest houses. Foods served by local hotels, dhabas (roadside eateries for the travelers) are of good quality and served fresh.

On auspicious occasions like Navaratris, Datta Pournima; Mahapuja is organised which is followed by Mahaprasad (Feast for the Pilgrims).

== Official Website ==
http://shrirenukamatamandir.org/
