= Umarkhed =

- City
- Location in Maharashtra, India Umarkhed (India)
- Coordinates: 19.6°N 77.7°E
- Country: India
- State: Maharashtra
- District: Yavatmal

Government
  - Type: Municipal Council
  - Body: Umarkhed Municipal Council
- Elevation: 416 m (1,365 ft)

Population (2011)
  - Total: 47,458
- Demonym(s): Umarkhed wasi, Umarkhedi

Languages
  - Official: Marathi
- Time zone: UTC+5:30 (IST)
- Postal code: 445206
- Vehicle registration: MH 29

Umarkhed is a Municipal council in Yavatmal district of Indian State of Maharashtra. Audumber Nagari was the name of Umarkhed city before the Mughal invasion.

== Geography ==
Umarkhed is located at 19.6°N 77.7°E. It has an average elevation of 416meters (1364feet).

Umarkhed is a municipal town near the Painganga River. It is a tehsil place. It is situated 110km from Yavatmal and 72 km from Nanded. Umarkhed falls in Yavatmal district. It is surrounded by mountains and Ghats from three sides and a plane surface on one of its sides. During the monsoon, one can experience real treasure of nature.Ambona lake a tourist destination, is situated near the small town Churmura which is 3.6 km from Umarkhed city. The lake provides a beautiful boating site and a place to see sunsets and sunrises. Sahasrakund Waterfall in Painganga River near Jewali village is 50 km away from Umarkhed. Visitors come here in August, September, and October.

The town experiences very hot summers, mild winters and a cool monsoon. The temperature rises up to 45 degrees Celsius in the summer, while in the winter it experiences temperatures of 8 to 12 degrees Celsius.

Painganga Wildlife Sanctuary is located in Umarkhed Tehsil of Yavatmal district of the Indian state Maharashtra. It derives its name from the river Painganga or Painganga River which borders the sanctuary on its three sides. It encompasses a sprawling area of about 325 square kilometers and hosts a vast variety of flora and fauna. The sanctuary has been divided in the central region by a wide valley which forms the border of Nanded and Yavatmal districts. The flora of the Painganga Wildlife Sanctuary features an exquisite combination of southern mixed deciduous forests and dry teak forests. The numerous species of fauna sheltered here include Fox, Leopard, Jackal, Hare, Four Horned Antelope, Porcupine, Sambar, Nilgai, Black Buck, Chinkara and many others. It is also a paradise for bird watchers to view Vulture, Bulbuls, Doves, Kingfishers, Cuckoos, Kites, and other birds. The best time to visit Painganga Wildlife Sanctuary is from the months of January to June. Jungle safari is an enjoyable experience in Painganga Wildlife Sanctuary.

There is a Balaji Mandir(Temple) near Umarkhed. The temple is archeologically important and located near the village ofDhanora(Sa). The Balaji statue is 600 years old. The temple also serves as a community centre, providing space for festivals and such. Temple of Shri Kshetra Panchmukhi Mahadev Mandir, Hardada is also near Umarkhed.

== Demographics ==
As of 2011 India census, Umarkhed had a population of 47,458. Males constitute 51.13% of the population and females 48.87%. Umarkhed has an average literacy rate of 76.16%, higher than the national average of 61.5%: male literacy is 80.19%, and female literacy is 71.94%. In Umarkhed, 13.71% of the population is under 6 years of age.

Its population in 1961 was 12,647.

Year	Male	Female	Total Population	Change	Religion (%)							
Year	Male	Female	Total Population	Change	Hindu	Muslim	Christian	Sikhs	Buddhist	Jain	Other religions and persuasions	Religion not stated
2001	17600	16459	34059	-	59.793	33.527	0.159	0.062	5.608	0.843	0.000	0.009
2011	24268	23190	47458	0.393	58.325	34.306	0.154	0.036	6.262	0.839	0.017	0.061

View source data.

== See also ==
- Painganga Wildlife Sanctuary
- Sahasrakund Waterfall
- Ambona lake
