= Digras =

- City
- Location in Maharashtra, India Digras (India)
- Coordinates: 20.1°N 77.73°E
- Country: India
- State: Maharashtra
- District: Yavatmal

Government
  - Type: Municipal council
- Elevation: 475 m (1,558 ft)

Population (2011)
  - Total: 254,122
- Demonym: Digraskar

Languages
  - Official: Marathi
- Time zone: UTC+5:30 (IST)
- Pin code: 445203
- Vehicle registration: Pusad

Digras is a city and a municipal council in the Yavatmal district located in the state of Maharashtra, India. Digras is 638 km from state capital Mumbai (via Aurangabad, Nashik) and 221 km from winter capital Nagpur.

== Places of Interest ==
Mallikarjun Temple

- Ghanti Baba Temple
- Bhavani Devi Temple
- Ramananda Maharaj Math
- Shani Mandir
- Oldest Jain Mandir 1008 Babji Maharaj Mandir
- Nagina Masjid
- Lal building

== Demographics ==
As of the 2011 India census, Digras had a population of 154,122. Males constitute 52% of the population and females 48%.

Year	Male	Female	Total Population	Change	Religion (%)							
Year	Male	Female	Total Population	Change	Hindu	Muslim	Christian	Sikhs	Buddhist	Jain	Other religions and persuasions	Religion not stated
2001	20261	18917	39178	-	55.850	36.155	0.115	0.041	6.366	1.450	0.023	0.000
2011	22780	21987	44767	0.143	55.452	36.759	0.118	0.047	6.353	1.112	0.060	0.098

== Transportation ==
Digras is connected to major cities in the Maharashtra State by road. MSRTC buses run from Digras to Mumbai, Nagpur, Yavatmal, Pune, Amravati, Akola, Hingoli, Nanded, Solapur, Aurangabad, Raipur, Umarkhed, Mahur, Adilabad, Mahagaon and Indore. Roads in Digras are not yet equipped with traffic signals.
