= Ajanta, Maharashtra =

Village in Maharashtra

Ajantha
- city
- Location in Maharashtra, India Ajantha (India)
- Coordinates: 20.5333°N 75.7500°E
- Country: India
- State: Maharashtra
- District: Aurangabad
- Elevation: 586 m (1,923 ft)
- Time zone: UTC+5:30 (IST)
- Postal code: 431117
- ISO 3166 code: IN-MH
- Website: maharashtra.gov.in

Ajanta or Ajantha is a village in Aurangabad district, Maharashtra, on the road between Jalgaon and Aurangabad near the Ajanta Caves.

== Geography ==
It has an average elevation of 586 metres (1,923 ft).
