= Mahagaon, Yavatmal =

Mahagaon
- Taluka
- Location in Maharashtra, India
- Country: India
- State: Maharashtra

Languages
  - Official: Marathi
- Time zone: UTC+5:30 (IST)
- PIN: 445205
- ISO 3166 code: IN-MH
- Vehicle registration: MH-29
- Website: maharashtra.gov.in

Mahagaon is located in Pusad subdivision of Yavatmal district in the state of Maharashtra, India.

It is located on the Maharashtra State Highway-3 MH MSH-3 and Maharashtra State Highways MH SH-183.

== Villages ==
Village list under Mahagaon Taluka administration

Sr	Village Names
1	Amani Bk.
2	Amani Kh.
3	Amboda
4	Anandnagar
5	Anantwadi
6	Babasahebnagar
7	Beldari
8	Bhamb
9	Bhosa
10	Bijora
11	Bondhara
12	Bori
13	Botha
14	Brahmi
15	Chilgavhan
16	Chilli Ijara
17	Chincholi
18	Chinchpad
19	Dagad Thar
20	Dahisawali
21	Dahiwad Kh.
22	Dhanoda
23	Dharegaon
24	Dharkanha
25	Dharmoha
26	Dongargaon
27	Fulsawangi
28	Fulsing Nagar
29	Gaul bh
30	Ghanmukh
31	Ghonsara
32	Gunj
33	Hingani
34	Hiwalani
35	Hiwara
36	Hiwardari
37	Hiwari
38	Ijani
39	Januna
40	Kalgaon
41	K ali
42	Kali
43	Kalulalnagar
44	Kanha
45	Karanji
46	Karanjkhed
47	Kasarbehel
48	Kasola
49	Katarwadi
50	Kaudgaon
51	Kaurwadi
52	Kaurwadi
53	Kawatha Jahagir
54	Khadaka
55	Khamalwadi
56	Kondari
57	Kothari
58	Leva
59	Lohara Kh.
60	Mahagaon
61	Malegaon
62	Malkapur
63	Malkinhi
64	Malvakad
65	Manoharnagar
66	Mohadi
67	Morath Jahagir
68	Morwadi
69	Mudana
70	Nagarwadi
71	Naiknagar
72	Nandgavhan
73	Nehrunagar
74	Pedhi
75	Pimpalgaon
76	Pimpalgaon
77	Pimpari
78	Pohandul
79	Pokhari
80	Rahur
81	Rajura
82	Rautwadi
83	Sadhunagar
84	Sai
85	Sangam
86	Sarkinhi
87	Sataghari
88	Sawana
89	Senad
90	Sevadasnagar
91	Sevanagar
92	Shirmal
93	Shirpulli
94	Shirpur
95	Sudhakar Nagar
96	Tarodi
97	Tembhi
98	Tembhurdara
99	Thar Bk.
100	Tiwarang
101	Tulshinagar
102	Uti
103	Vasant Nagar
104	Wadad
105	Wadad
106	Waghnath
107	Wakad Kh
108	Wakan
109	Wakodi
110	Wanoli
111	Warodi
112	Weni Bk.
