= Malegaon Jahangir =

Malegaon
- Town
- Malegaon Jahangir
- Nickname: Malegaon
- State: Maharashtra
- District Region Division: Washim Vidarbha Amravati
- Established: in 16th century
- Named for: Malneshwar temple and Maalyudh

Government
  - Type: Nagar panchayat
  - Rank: 3rdppp

Population (2011)
  - Total: 50,322

Languages
  - Official: Marathi, Hindi, Urdu, Banjari, Gawaran etc
- Time zone: UTC+5:30 (IST)
- PIN: 444503
- Telephone code: 91-7256
- Vehicle registration: MH37 (Washim District)

Malegaon Jahangir is a big town and headquarters of Malegaon taluka in Washim subdivision of Washim district of Maharashtra state in India. It is located on the state highway joining south-east Maharashtra and Vidarbha to southern India. Malegaon is on the main road which is between Washim and Mehkar. It is a major junction for road-based transport.

In medieval Prakrit, "Malla" was associated with wrestler. There is a legend that during the medieval period this town was the centre of wrestling in the Vidarbha and Marathwada region, hence the name Malegaon. Also, its strategic location made it famous and sometimes known as a gateway for Nijam Shahi and Mughals and it was a famous place where Shivaji mostly had come for Malneshwar Shivling Darshan.

== History ==
Medieval period and Raje Udaram family -- Malegaon Jahagir was a part of Mughal Berar since 1595. It was the Jahagir of Mughal nobleman Raje Udaram Deshmukh of Mahur. Later his wife Rai bagan or Raibaghini was the ruler of Malegaon Jahagir. The word Jahagir in the name of village depicts the Jahagir of Raje Udaram. The historically famous house, ruled from Malegaon Jahagir to Mahur. After the fall of Mughal empire, the family got Parwancha from Maratha king Chhatrapati Shahu Maharaj. In 1802, the jahagir of the house was divided into six parts viz. Malegaon jahangir, Wara Jahangir, Ansing, Washim, Mahur, Pusad and Kalamnuri among six brothers. Old district Gazetteer of Akola district, speaks about minor Jagirdar of branch of house namely, Gopalrao Kashirao Deshmukh. Today, his descendants are known by the surname ‘Raje’. There is a Shanaishwar Mahadeo temple of House of Raje Udaram in Malegaon Jahagir.

During the rule of Chhatrapati Shahu I, there was a continuous struggle between Nizam of Hyderabad, Bhosale of Nagpur and Peshwas for this part of berar. The territory was made a buffer state and the tax was divided into three parts for three different rulers. The house of Raje Udaram continued its rule as a Jahagirdar.

Rai Yaswant Rao Rajurkar was a noble mentioned in records of the Mughal administrative system during the reign of the Mughal emperor Aurangzeb. According to historian M. Athar Ali, he held a mansab of 4000/4000, indicating a high rank within the Mughal nobility.

Raosaheb Bimbaji Vanjal (Vanjari) Rajurkar is mentioned in regional historical literature as a sardar connected with the Nagpur Bhonsale state Raghuji_1 Era

== Location ==
Malegaon is 20 km from district headquarter Washim. 275 km from Nagpur and 531 km from state capital Mumbai.

== Demographics ==
According to the 2011 Census the population of Malegaon is 50,322

== Tourism ==
There are many temples in the Malegaon area such as Nagartas Devi Sansthan, Davha and Malneshvar Temple. The village named Shirpur Jain which is near to Malegaon famous for a statue of Lord Parshwanath which is stable in the air without support

== Education ==
In Malegaon there are college named Ramrao Zhanak College of Arts, Science and Commerce. Others schools are N N Mundada High School and Science, Commerce, Arts Jr College.Shantikisan Junior college Kalambeshwar

== Transport ==
Malegaon is well connected by road to other cities like Washim, Risod, Mehkar, Akola, Karanja. Washim railway station is the nearest railway station from Malegaon. Jaulka railway station is the second railway station near Malegaon. The nearest international airport from Malegaon is the Dr. Babasaheb Ambedkar International Airport at Nagpur. Akola and Amravati are other airports near Malegaon.

== Modern Days ==
Now in modern days it is famous for cultivation of pulses, soya, wheat and other agricultural products. Another distinction is from the excellent printing industry this town offers.

== See also ==
Washim district
