= Berar Province =

British Indian province under the nominal sovereignty of Hyderabad State

Coordinates: 20°55′N 77°45′E

- Province of British India under the nominal sovereignty of Hyderabad State
- 1724–1903
- Flag

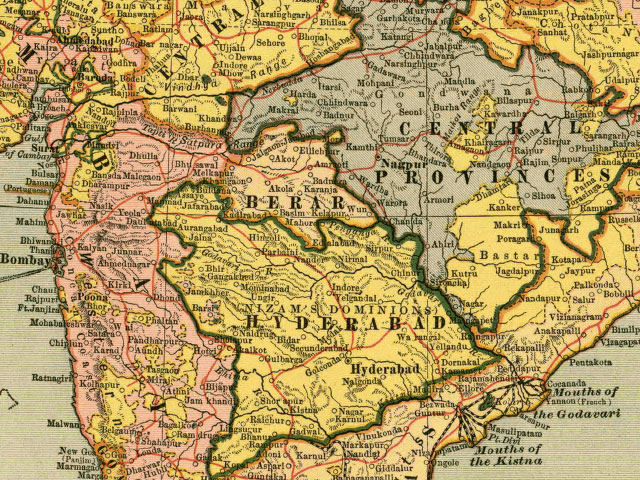
- Hyderabad and Berar Province in 1903
- Capital: Ellichpur
- Area
  - 1881: 29,340 km^{2} (11,330 sq mi)
- Population
  - 1881: 2,672,673
- History
  - The Nizam of Hyderabad becomes the de jure sovereign of Berar: 1724
  - Establishment of the Berar Division: 1903
Preceded by	Succeeded by
Berar Subah	Berar Division
- This article incorporates text from a publication now in the public domain: Chisholm, Hugh, ed. (1911). "Berar". Encyclopædia Britannica (11th ed.). Cambridge University Press.

Hyderabad State (dark green) and Berar Province not a part of Hyderabad State but also the Nizam's Dominion between 1853 and 1903 (light green).

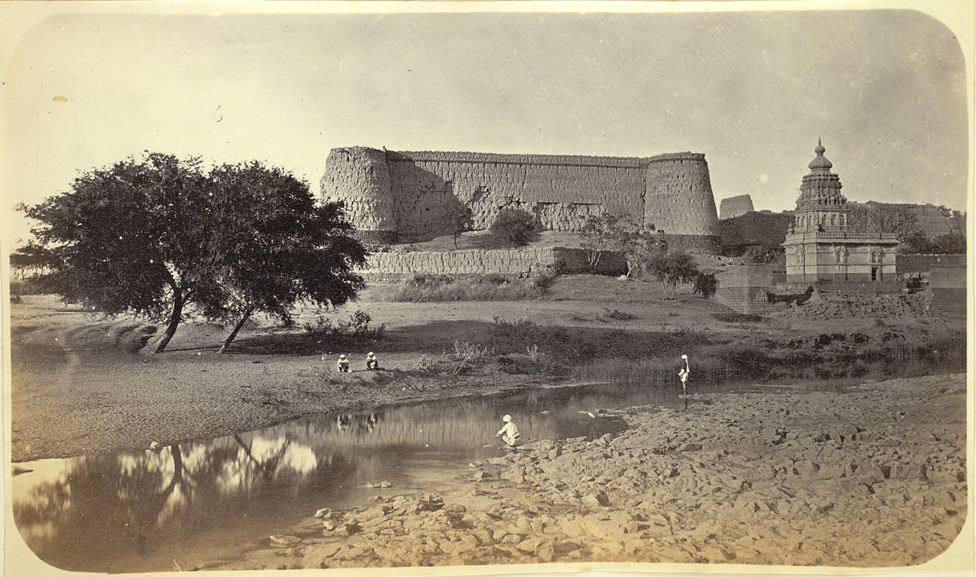
Narnala Fort in Berar, 1860.

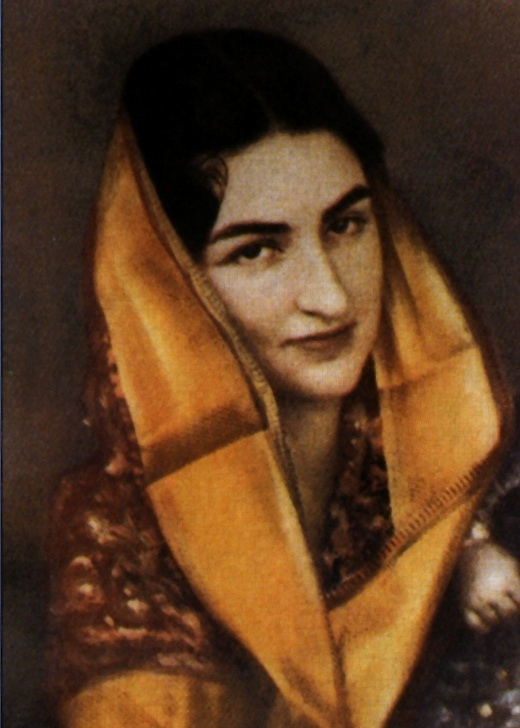
Princess Durru Shehvar held the title of 'Princess of Berar'.

Berar Province, also known as the Hyderabad Assigned Districts, was a province of Hyderabad. After 1853, it was administered by the British, although the Nizam retained formal sovereignty over the province. Azam Jah, the eldest son of the 7th Nizam, held the title of Mirza-Baig ("Prince") of Berar, modern day approximately Amravati Division of Vidarbha, Maharashtra.

In 1881, the population of Berar was 2,672,673. The total area of the territory was 29,340 square kilometres (11,330 sq mi).

After 1 October 1903, the administration of the province was placed under the Commissioner-General for the Central Provinces, as the Berar Division. In 1936, the territory was renamed as the Central Provinces and Berar, and its legislative assembly was established.

The successor to Berar, with changed boundaries, is Amravati division in the Vidarbha of Maharashtra.

== History ==
=== Background ===
Before the Mughal occupation, Berar was a part of the Ahmadnagar Sultanate. It was ceded to Emperor Akbar by Chand Bibi in 1596, who was unable to stand against the imperial forces led by Murad Mirza (son of Akbar). After this initial victory, Prince Mirza Murad settled in Berar, with Balapur as his headquarters. Near Balapur, he founded a new city named Shahpur and constructed a beautiful palace for himself. As his relationship was deteriorating with Abdul Rahim Khan-i-Khanan, the commander of the army, Akbar recalled Khan-i-Khanan and sent his trusted friend Abul Fazl to help him. Mirza Murad died in 1598. After his death, Daniyal Mirza was given the charge as governor of Berar, Ahmadnagar, and Khandesh, and Khan-i-Khanan was sent along with Mirza Daniyal. Emperor Akbar died in 1605.

In 1611, the southern provinces of Ahmadnagar, Berar, and Khandesh defied Mughal sovereignty under Malik Ambar. Jahangir sent Mirza Raja Man Singh I and others to crush the revolt. Mirza Raja Man Singh I died a natural death on 6 July 1614 at Achalpur. During Jahangir's rule, Malik Ambar, till his death in 1626, recovered a substantial part of the Deccan from the Mughals including Berar. In 1628, the first year of the reign of Shah Jahan (Mirza Khurram), Berar again came under the Mughal sway.

In 1636, the Mughal possessions in Dakhin (Deccan) were divided into 4 Subahs. Berar Subah was one of them, with Ellichpur as its capital, and Gawilghur as its main fort. Aurangzeb was appointed Viceroy of the four Deccan Subahs for the first time, and he occupied the post for eight years (till 1644). He was again appointed viceroy for the second time in 1653, and he remained in that post till 1657. During Aurangzeb's reign, Mirza Azam was appointed at Berar, and then Amir Qamaruddin Nizam became the Viceroy of Berar. Berar was successively overrun by the Mughals after the Mughals appointed the Maratha Senapati Sawai Shri Shriman Santaji Bhonsle Seena Sahib-e-Subah because Santaji was the father-in-law of Mirza Bedarbakht, son of Mirza Azam, and grandson of Aurangzeb.

In 1720, Maratha Peshwa Balaji Vishwanath had the right to collect chauth and sardeshmukhi from Berar.

=== Nizam and Maratha period ===
In 1724, Nizam-ul-Mulk, Asaf Jah I established the independent line of the Nizam of Hyderabad, and thenceforth the latter claimed to be de jure sovereigns of Berar, with exception of certain districts (Mehkar, Pusad, etc.) ceded to the Maratha Peshwa in 1760 and 1795. The claim was contested by the Maratha Bhonsle rajas of Nagpur, and for more than half a century the country was devastated by wars between the two.

This condition of things was ended by Wellesley's victories at Assaye and Argaon (1803), which forced the Bhonsla raja to cede his territories south of Gawilgarh and Narnala Fort and east of the Wardha River. The forts of Gavilgad and Narnala remained subject to the Bhonsles of Nagpur.

By the partition treaty of Hyderabad (1804) between Nizam and the British, these ceded territories in Berar were transferred in perpetual sovereignty to the Nizam, together with some tracts about Sindkhed Raja and Jalna, which had been held by Scindia. The treaty of 1822 extinguished Maratha's right to levy tribute (chauth), the Wardha River was fixed as the eastern boundary of Berar, the Melghat and adjoining districts in the plains being assigned to the Nizam, in exchange for the districts east of the Wardha held by the Peshwa.

When Berar was no longer protected by its Maratha taskmasters, it remained long prey to the turbulent elements let loose by the sudden cessation of the wars. From time to time bands of soldiers, whom the government was powerless to control, scoured the country, and rebellion upon rebellion till 1859, when the last fight against open rebels took place at Chichamba near Risod.

=== British Raj ===
At last, the British government intervened, and in 1853, a new treaty was signed with the Nizam, under which the Hyderabad contingent was to be maintained by the British government, while the pay of this force and in satisfaction of other claims, certain districts were assigned to the East India Company. It was these "Hyderabad Assigned Districts" that were popularly supposed to form the province of Berar. In 1860, by a new treaty modified in Nizam's favour of 1853, it was agreed that Berar should be held in trust by the British government for the purposes specified in the treaty of 1853.

After 1865, the American Civil War gave an immense stimulus to Berar's cotton trade, as did the laying of a railway line across the province.

Building Berar's prosperity on cotton, however, came with a price. During the famine of 1900, for example, nearly 8.5% of the population died, "with the greatest number of deaths", according to the historian Sven Beckert, "occurring in districts most specialized in cotton production".

Through an agreement signed on 5 November 1902, 6th Nizam Mahboob Ali Khan leased Berar permanently to the British against an annual payment of 25 lakhs Rupees. Lord Curzon decided to merge Berar with the Central Provinces, and this was proclaimed on 17 September 1903. Thus the Central Provinces and Berar was born by a Residency Order, dated 30 September 1903, and the administration of Berar was placed under the Chief Commissioner of the Central Provinces.

On 1 October 1903, Berar was placed under the administration of the British Commissioner–General of the Central Provinces. In 1936, with the establishment of the legislative assembly of the "Central Provinces and Berar", the territory was renamed as the Central Provinces and Berar. Berar became known as Berar Division.

==== Administration ====
In 1853, after the administration of the province was assigned to the British East India Company by the Nizam following a treaty, it was divided into two districts, South Berar with its headquarters at Hingoli, and North Berar with its headquarters at Buldhana. Both were placed under a deputy commissioner. After the Indian Rebellion of 1857, Hingoli and its adjoining areas were restored to the Nizam and the province was reconstituted into two districts, East Berar with its headquarters at Amravati, and West Berar with its headquarters at Akola.

In 1864, East Berar was divided into two districts: Amravati and Southeast Berar (which was first renamed as Wun district and then in 1905, Yavatmal district), with headquarters at Yavatmal. In 1867, Ellichpur District was also carved out of Amravati. In 1864, the talukas of Malkapur, Chikhli, and Mehkar were separated from the West Berar District, and a new district, Southwest Berar District, was formed, which was renamed Mehkar District in 1865. In 1867, Buldhana was selected as the district's headquarters, and later the district was renamed as Buldana district. In 1868, Washim district was formed.

Berar consisted of one Division with a Commissioner and six districts viz. Amravati, Achalpur, Wun, Akola, Buldhana, and Washim in 1905. It was rearranged into four Amravati, Yavatmal, Akola, and Buldhana districts. In 1869, municipal administrations were introduced at Amravati, Akola, Achalpur, Washim, Yavatmal, and Khamgaon. Later, Shegaon (1881), Akot (1884), and by 1904, four more, became municipal towns.

==== Officers of Berar Province ====
- Commissioner - Lt. Col W Hastings
  - Deputy Commissioner - A Godwin-Austen
- Judicial Commissioner - J K Batten
  - Civil and Sessions Judge - F W A Prideaux

== See also ==
- Berar sultanate
- Berar Subah
- Nizam of Hyderabad
- Vidarbha
