= Shahapur, Buldhana =

Village in Maharashtra

Shahapur
- village
- Location in Maharashtra, India
- Coordinates: 20.5131329°N 76.7518187°E
- Country: India
- State: Maharashtra
- District: Buldhana

Population
  - Total: 1,800

Languages
  - Official: Marathi
- Time zone: UTC+5:30 (IST)
- PIN: 444303
- Lok Sabha Constituency: Buldhana

Shahapur is a historic place near Balapur near Akola, Maharashtra. At present it is a small town in the Khamgaon Tehsil of Buldhana district.

After this initial victory at Ahmednagar Prince Murad Mirza, son of Akbar settled in Berar Subah with Balapur as his headquarters. Near Balapur he founded a new city named Shahapur and constructed a beautiful palace near the banks of Mun River for himself during 1597. The shahpur forts / palace was built by Muhammad Azam Shah the son of Aurangzeb.

== History ==
The account of Berar in the Ain-i-Akbari was added- to that work in 1596–97. The greater part of the Akola district was included in Akbar's sarkar or revenue district of Narnala, but some of the parganas of this sarkar are now included in Buldhana, while Akola, on the other hand, includes three parganas of Akbar's revenue district of Basim. The whole revenue demand for the area now included in the Akola district seems to have been nearly twenty-four lakhs of rupees. The only special notice of any places in the District has reference to Balapur, Shahpur, and Basim. ' Near Balapur,' says Abul Fazl, ' are two streams, about the borders of which are found various kinds of pretty stones, which are cut and kept as curiosities. Six kos distant were the headquarters of Sultan Murad, which grew into a fine city under the name of Shahpur. Of Basim he writes,' About Basim is an indigenous race, for the most part proud and refractory, called Hatgars: their forces consist of 1000, cavalry and 5000 infantry.' He adds that the Hatgars are Rajputs, which is a mistake, for they are a branch of the Dhangar caste. It is strange that according to the figures of the census of 1901 Hatgars were exceptionally weak in numbers in the late Basim district.

36. After the fall of Ahmednagar Balapur was still the principal garrison town of Berar, but Daniyal Mirza preferred Burhanpur, where he died of drink in 1605, as his viceregal capital. The death of his favourite son was a severe shock to Akbar, who survived Daniyal only for a few months, and died in October 1605, when he was succeeded by his eldest son Salim, who took the title of Jahangir.

== Geography ==
It lies near the banks of Mun River and can be visited from Undri - Ambetakli in Buldhana district or from Wadegaon in Akola district.

== Visitor's attractions ==
The Dargah of Nipani Baba is situated on the bank of Mun River. The Fair of Baba regionally known as urus takes place every year.

The temple of Lord Shiva is situated at confluence of revers Namely (Mun, Torna, Vishwamitra, Utavali etc.) It is believed that the Shiv Linga was established by Rama.

== See also ==
- Berar sultanate
