= Capture of Gawilghur =

1803 battle of the Second Anglo-Maratha War

Capture of Gwalior
- Part of the Second Anglo-Maratha War
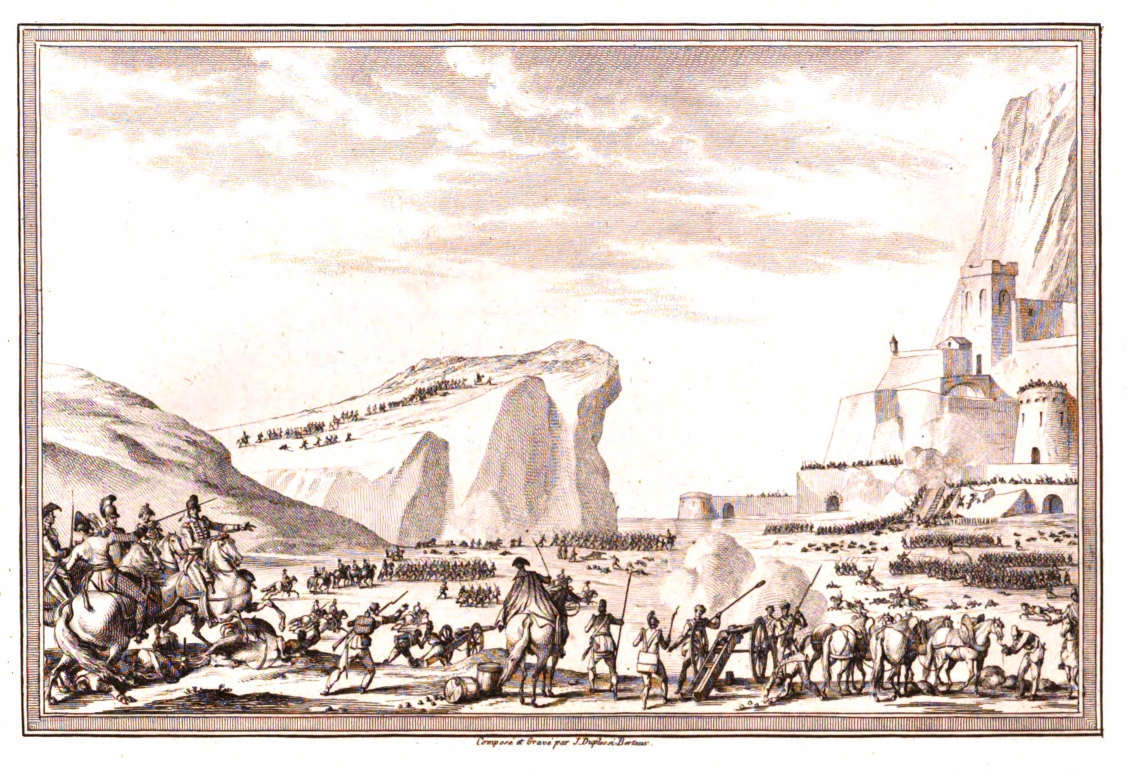
- Assault on the Gwalior Fort
Date	15 December 1803
Location	Gwalior Fort, Madhya Pradesh
Result	British victory

Belligerents
British Empire: East India Company	Maratha Empire

Commanders and leaders
(United Kingdom of Great Britain and Ireland) Arthur Wellesley	Beni Singh Rajput †

Strength
Unknown	3,000

Casualties and losses
132	1,200

The capture of Gawilghur in western India by British East India Company forces under the command of Sir Arthur Wellesley on 15 December 1803 during the Second Anglo-Maratha War was the culminating act in the defeat of the forces of Raghoji II Bhonsle, Rajah of Berar. Gawilghur's garrison of 3,000 was commanded by Beni Singh Rajput, assisted by Manoo Bapu, who was the cousin of Raje Bhosale of Nagpur and Killedar Rana Shivsingh, a Rajput Commander of Narnala and also the Governor of Gawilgad and surrounding forts. Rana Shivsingh Rajput was brother-in-law of Jamadar Beni Singh Rajput. (Note: In Dictionary of National Biography Gawilghur is spelt Guzzulgaum (Stephens 1886, p. 350).)

== Prelude ==
At the time, Gawilghur was considered unassailable and the defenders believed they could hold the mountain fortress regardless of whatever the British Army threw at it. The defensive works consisted of two fortresses, one outer and one inner. The Outer Fort was considered more of a decoy, and behind that lay a ravine, across which lay the gate to the Inner Fort. An army could theoretically capture the Outer Fort before realizing that the greater task lay in assaulting the inner. The Inner Fort was protected by several gates, the first of which was the least defensible. After breaking through that first gate, however, an assaulting army would turn sharply to the left and follow a narrow passage up to a second gate, all the while being attacked by the defenders from above.

== Assault ==
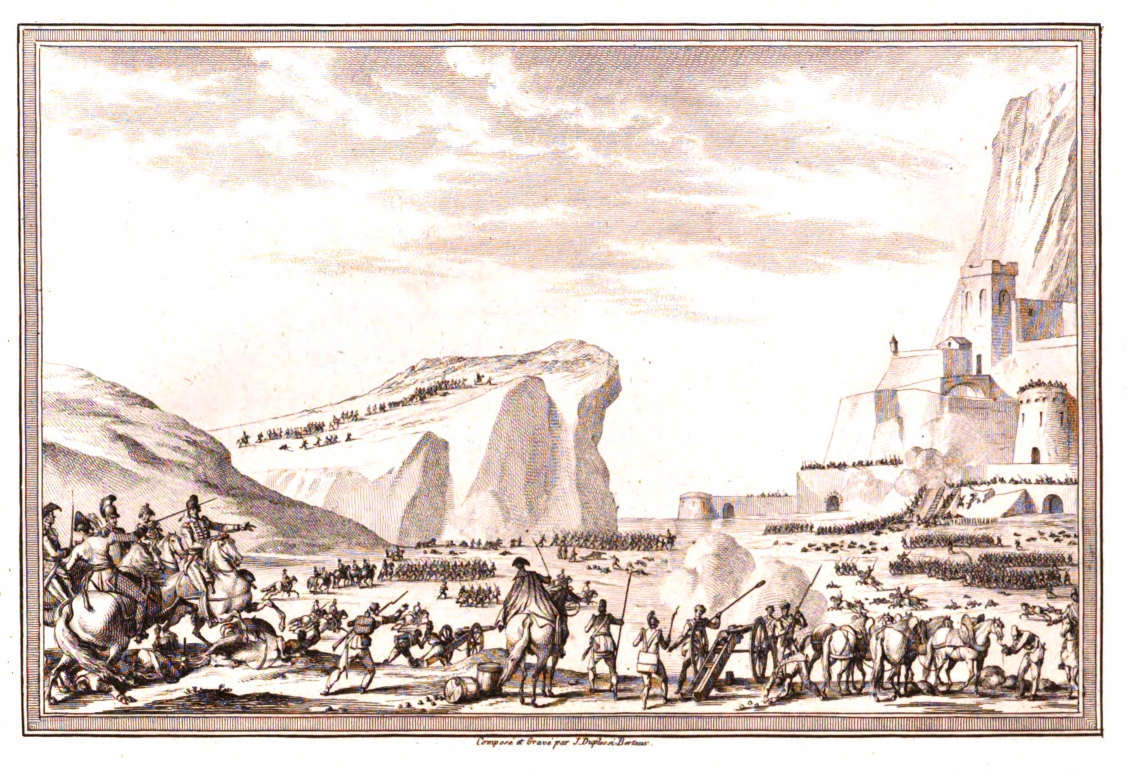
Assault of Fort Gawilghur by Jean Duplessis-Bertaux

This was largely the case when Arthur Wellesley's army attacked Gawilghur. Lieutenant Colonel Kenny, of the 11th Regiment of Foot succeeded in taking the Outer Fort, and led the assault on the Inner Fort, supported by flank companies of the 94th Regiment of Foot, and sepoys from Major General James Stevenson's division. At the same time, the 74th and 78th Highlanders diverted the attention of the defenders by false attacks from the south.

After the bombardment commenced on 12 December, the assault on the 14th might have been doomed to failure in the narrow passageways of the Inner Fort had it not been for the bravery of an officer of the 94th. Captain Campbell and his Light Company made a "daring ascent ...on the seemingly impossible southern face." They were then able to open the gates of the inner fort for the main force. The British had 132 casualties, while the Maratha's casualties amounted to 1200, including the deaths of Manoo Bapu and the Killedar, Beni Singh.

== Aftermath ==
When the Second Anglo-Maratha war ended, Gawilghur was returned to the Maratha Empire, although it was never again used as a stronghold.

== Popular culture ==
Lady Elizabeth Longford, in her book Wellington, the Years of the Sword, quotes Jac Weller whose opinion of Gawilghur was that 'three reasonably effective troops of Boy Scouts armed with rocks could have kept out several times their number of professional soldiers'.

The capture of Gawilghur was dramatized in Sharpe's Fortress by Bernard Cornwell, although credit for the breakthrough was given to Cornwell's fictional character Richard Sharpe, not Captain Campbell, though Campbell is featured in the novel.

== Bibliography ==
- Stephens, Henry Morse (1886). "Campbell, Colin (1776-1847)" . In Stephen, Leslie (ed.). Dictionary of National Biography. Vol. 8. London: Smith, Elder & Co. pp. 350–351.
