= Deulgaon Banda =

Village in Maharashtra

Deulgaon Deulgaon Banda
- Village
- Location in Maharashtra Deulgaon (India)
- Country: India
- State: Maharashtra
- District: Washim

Government
  - Type: Grampanchayat

Population (2011)
  - Total: 1,640

Languages
  - Official: Marathi
- Time zone: UTC+5:30 (IST)
- PIN: 444510
- Telephone code: 07251
- Vehicle registration: MH-37

Deulgaon, commonly known as "Deulgaon Banda" is a village located in Risod taluka of Washim district, in the state of Maharashtra.

== Demographics ==
As per 2011 census:

- Deulgaon Banda has 362 families residing. The village has population of 1640.
- Out of the population of 1640, 832 are males while 808 are females.
- Literacy rate of the village is 84.99%.
- Average sex ratio of the village is 971 females to 1000 males. Average sex ratio of Maharashtra state is 929.

== Geography, and transport ==
Distance between Deulgaon Banda, and district headquarter Washim is 28 kilometres (17 mi).
