= Balapur =

Balapur may refer to any of the following places in India:

- Balapur, Akola district, Maharashtra
  - Balapur (Vidhan Sabha constituency)
  - Balapur Fort
- Balapur, Ranga Reddy district, Hyderabad, Telangana
- Balapur, Vikramgad, in Palghar district of Maharashtra
