= Karanja Sohol Wildlife Sanctuary =

Wildlife sanctuary in Maharashtra, India

- IUCN category IV (habitat/species management area)
- Location within Maharashtra Location within India
- Interactive map of Karanja Sohol Wildlife Sanctuary
- Location: Washim District, Karanja taluka, Maharashtra
- Nearest city: Washim
- Coordinates: 20°24′00″N 77°30′00″E
- Area: 1,832 ha (4,530 acres)
- Established: February 27, 2000

Karanja Sohol Wildlife Sanctuary (Marathi: कारंजा सोहोल वन्यजीव अभयारण्य) is a protected area in the Karanja talukas of Washim district in Maharashtra, India. It was created in 2000 to preserve the black buck population. It covers 1,832 ha (18.32 km^{2}) of forest and grasslands.

== Description ==
The Karanja Sohol Wildlife Sanctuary is located some 7 km (4.3 mi) from Karanja town. There are a few undulating hills in the sanctuary with a large area which is a part of the catchment area of Aadan reservoir. The sanctuary is best approached by road from Washim. The nearest rail head is Murtizapur.

== History ==
The management plan for Karanja Sohol wildlife sanctuary is approved vide letter Desk-22(8)/521(3)/172 dt. 29/04/2009 for the year 2009/2010 to 2018/2019 by the Government of India.

== Biodiversity ==
=== Flora ===
Karanja Sohol Wildlife Sanctuary is an undulating tract of grasslands interspersed with wooded areas. The tropical and subtropical dry broadleaf forests harbours teak (Tectona grandis) and Coromandel ebony (Diospyros melanoxylon) as predominant species. Other important tree species include ain (Terminalia alata), axlewood (Anogeissus latifolia), lendia (Lagerstroemia parviflora), shiwan (Gmelina aoborea), kalamb (Mitragyna paoviflora), telia, Indian rosewood (Dalbergia latifolia) and bija (Pterocarpus marsupium).

=== Fauna ===
The sanctuary attracts a large variety of migratory waterfowl from November to March every year. 17 mammal species, 75 bird species, 18 reptiles, three amphibians, 23 fishes and 48 butterfly and spider species were recorded. Mammal species include Indian muntjac (Muntiacus muntjak), striped hyena (Hyaena hyaena), sambar deer (Rusa unicolor), jungle cat (Felis chaus), wild boar (Sus scrofa).

Grass has been grown to aid restoring blackbuck (Antilope cervicapra). and spotted deer (Axis axis).
