= Tarhala =

Village in Maharashtra

- village
- Location in Maharashtra, India Tarhala (India)
- Coordinates: 20°23′37.01″N 77°17′45.29″E
- Country: India
- State: Maharashtra
- District: Washim

Population
  - Total: 12,000

Languages
  - Official: Marathi
- Time zone: UTC+5:30 (IST)
- Nearest city: Washim

Tarhala is a village situated in Mangrulpir Tahsil of Washim district and 42 km from the district headquarters Washim. As per 1991 census the population of village is 2581. Present population of the village is about 3200. Education facility up to 10th standard is available in the village and number of students is 700. Also the Telephone, Electricity, Post office, Hospital facilities are available in the village. The main occupation of the villagers is agriculture and the main crops grown are Soybean, Cotton, paddy in kharip season and Wheat, Sunflower in Rabi season. Water of Sonal medium project is available through canal for Irrigation in the vicinity of village Tarhala. This village has a Dargah of Pashtun community. The temples of Shri Bhayaji Maharaj, Rashtrasant. Shri. Tukdoji Maharaj, Shri Fakirbaba, are in the village. The "Maruti Temple" which lies in the heart of the village is the centre stage location for most of the social activities in the village. Civic affairs of the village is managed by nine number of independent Grampanchyat. The majority of the families residing here are "Gawande" and "Deshmukh". The village is known for the large hoard of Satavahana coins found here during excavation. This hoard had coins of all the later Satavahana rulers from Gautamiputra Satakarni onwards besides the coins of some rulers of this dynasty, which were missed out in the Puranas.

The location of this village is all set to become strategically very important since the planned Kolkata-Mumbai express highway and the Kanyakumari-Delhi Express highway cross just 2 km from this village. The coordinates for this village are Latitude: 20°23'37.01"N and Longitude: 77°17'45.29"E.
