= Mangrulpir =

- Town
- Location in Maharashtra, India
- Coordinates: 20.3167°N 77.35°E
- Country: India
- State: Maharashtra
- District: Washim
- Named for: Sant, pir

Government
  - Type: Municipal council

Area
  - Total: 14.33 km^{2} (5.53 sq mi)
- Elevation: 429 m (1,407 ft)

Population (2011)
  - Total: 50,983
  - Density: 7,155/km^{2} (18,530/sq mi)
- Demonym: Mangrulkar

Languages
  - Official: Marathi
  - Other: Hindi, Urdu, English
- Time zone: UTC+5:30 (IST)
- PIN: 444403
- Vehicle registration: MH-37

Mangrulpir taluka is a town in the Washim District of Maharashtra, India. It is well-known for the Dada Hayat Qalandar Dargah and Shree Birbalnath Maharaj Temple. The town has a municipal council.

== Municipality ==
The Municipality at Mangrulpir is the youngest in the district. The Municipality was established at Mangrulpir in 1959 and is governed under the Maharashtra Municipalities Act, 1965. It covered an area of 11.76 square km. The Municipal council is composed 10 members for the scheduled castes or the scheduled tribes, or for women.

== Places to Visit ==
There are historic places of interest such as

- Dargah of Hazrat Sayyad Ahmad Kabeer and other Muslim saints and peers. The town is called Mangrulpir on account of these associations.
- The temple dedicated to Birbalnath Maharaj who hailed from Punjab and took samadhi on February 4, 1928. An annual fair is held in honour of Birbalnath Maharaj on Magha Shuddha Panchami to Mahashivratri in the months of February–March. About 10 to 12 thousand people assemble at the

time of the fair.

== Population ==
Year	Male	Female	Total Population	Change	Religion (%)							
Year	Male	Female	Total Population	Change	Hindu	Muslim	Christian	Sikhs	Buddhist	Jain	Other religions and persuasions	Religion not stated
2001	14429	13386	27815	-	46.914	43.638	0.029	0.022	8.330	0.942	0.032	0.093
2011	15963	15020	30983	0.114	41.662	49.776	0.116	0.013	7.523	0.762	0.003	0.145

== Geography ==
Mangrulpir has coordinates 77.346789°E 20.310143°N. Mangrulpir town is located in Washim district. The whole region lies on the deccan plateau. It has an altitude of 429m. The town is 40 km from district headquarter and 671 km from state capital Mumbai. It is an important town in the district. Mangrulpir Tehsil has a strong rural network. Washim is nearest railway station.

== Climate ==
This town has a tropical savannah climate. The Köppen-Geiger climate classification is Aw. Although temperatures remain warm to hot throughout the year, the period between October and February experiences cold temperatures during nights. Mid-February to May is hot and dry. Humidity starts increasing with the advent of Indian South-West Monsoon from June. Early June to Early October sees heavy rainfall in spells.

Climate data for Mangrulpir Raingauge Station
Month	Jan	Feb	Mar	Apr	May	Jun	Jul	Aug	Sep	Oct	Nov	Dec	Year
Average rainfall inches (mm)	0.44 (11.3)	0.31 (7.9)	0.35 (8.8)	0.23 (5.9)	0.35 (8.9)	5.93 (150.5)	9.80 (249.0)	8.59 (218.2)	6.34 (161.0)	2.02 (51.3)	0.60 (15.3)	0.20 (5.2)	35.17 (893.3)
Source: IMD Pune

== See also ==
- Tarhala
- Karanja Lad
- Washim
