= Medshi =

- city
- Location in Maharashtra, India
- Coordinates: 20.19°N 76.56°E
- Country: India
- State: Maharashtra
- District: Washim

Languages
  - Official: Marathi
- Time zone: UTC+5:30 (IST)

Medshi is a small town in Washim district in the Indian state of Maharashtra. It is situated on the bank of the Morna river, close to the Urdhav Morna Prakalpa dam, along State Highway 204.

== Notable Locations and Events ==
Medshi is home to Dagh, a famous temple dedicated to Lord Shiva. Medshi also hosts a local fair each January, the Khandoba Yatra.

== Politics ==
Prior to the delimitation of legislative assembly constituencies in 2008, Medshi was the constituency number 113 of Maharashtra Legislative Assembly between 1977-2004.
