= Berar Subah =

Subah of the Mughal Empire

- 1596–1724
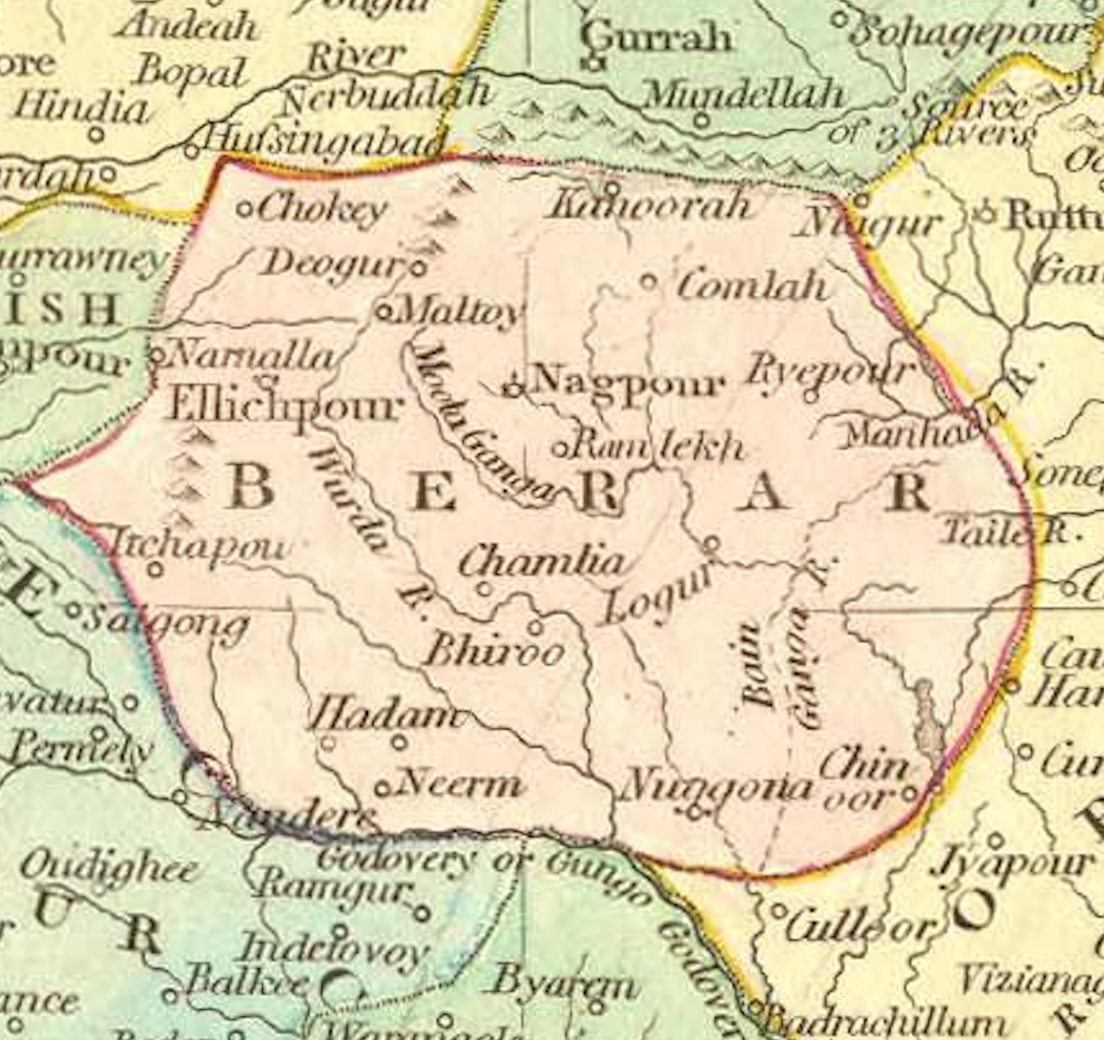
- Berar Subah depicted in map of Mughal Empire by Robert Wilkinson (1805)
- Capital: Ellichpur
- History
  - Conquered by Akbar: 1596
  - The Nizam of Hyderabad becomes the de jure sovereign of Berar: 1724

Area
  - 1601: 49,786 sq mi (128,950 km^{2})
Preceded by	Succeeded by
Ahmednagar Sultanate	Hyderabad State
- This article incorporates text from a publication now in the public domain: Chisholm, Hugh, ed. (1911). "Berar". Encyclopædia Britannica (11th ed.). Cambridge University Press.

The Berar Subah (Persian: صوبه برار) was one of the Subahs (provinces) of the Mughal Empire, in Central India from 1596 to 1724. It bordered Golconda, Ahmadnagar (both conquered in 1601), Kandesh and Malwa provinces as well as the independent and tributary kingdoms to the east.

== Origin of name ==
According to the Ain-i-Akbari, the original name of Berar was Waradatat (the banks of Varada River).

== History ==
Before the Mughal occupation, Berar was part of the Nizam Shahi sultanate of Ahmadnagar. It was ceded to the emperor Akbar by Chand Bibi in 1596, unable to stand against the imperial forces led by prince Murad. After this initial victory Prince Murad settled in Berar with Balapur as his headquarters. Near Balapur he founded a new city named Shahpur and constructed a beautiful palace for himself. As his relationship was deteriorating with Abdul Rahim Khan-i-Khanan, the commander of the army, Akbar recalled Khan-i-Khanan and sent his trusted friend Abul Fazl to help him. Murad died in 1598. After his death, Prince Daniel was given the charge as governor of Berar, Ahmadnagar and Khandesh, Khan-i- Khanan was sent along with Daniel. Akbar died in 1605.

In 1611, the southern provinces of Ahmadnagar, Berar and Khandesh defied Mughal sovereignty under Malik Ambar. Jahangir sent Man Singh and others to crush the revolt. Man Singh died a natural death on 6 July 1614 at Ellichpur. During Jahangir’s rule, Malik Ambar till his death in 1626 recovered a substantial part of the Deccan from the Mughals including Berar. In 1628, the first year of reign of Shah Jahan, Berar again came under the Mughal sway.

In 1636, the Mughal possessions in Dakhin (Deccan) were divided into 4 Subahs. Berar was one of them with Ellichpur as its capital and Gavilgad as its main fort. Aurangzeb was appointed viceroy of four Deccan Subahs for the first time and he occupied the post for eight years (till 1644). He was again appointed viceroy for the second time in 1653 and he remained in that post till 1657. During Aurangzeb's reign, Berar was successively overrun by the Maratha rulers Shambhaji in 1680 and Rajaram in 1698. In 1720, Maratha Peshwa Balaji Vishwanath obtained the grant of the right to collect chauth and sardeshmukhi from Berar from the Mughal emperor.

In 1724, when Nizam-ul-Mulk Asaf Jah declared independence, the existence of Berar as a Mughal Subah came to an end. It became (though nominally) a part of Nizam's state.

== Administrative divisions ==
Berar came under Mughal administration in 1596. Todar Mal's famous system known as bandobast was made applicable to the Berar Subah.

The area of the Berar Subah during Akbar's reign was 72,000 sq. miles. According to Ain-i-Akbari, its northern limit was Handia, the eastern limit was the fort of Vairagad near Bastar, the southern limit was Telangana and the western limit was Mahkarabad. Ellichpur was the capital of the Subah. The important forts of the Subah were Gawilgad, Narnala, Pavanar, Khedala, Manikdurg and Mahur. It was divided into 13 sarkars consisting of 242 parganas.

The sarkars and parganas of the Berar Subah (province) were:

Sarkar (district)	No. of Parganas (tehsil)
Gavil	46; Ellichpur was the capital of Berar
Khedala	35
Pavanar	5
Narnala	34
Kalamb	31
Washim	8
Mahur	20
Manikdurg	8
Pathri	18
Telangana	19
Ramgad	5
Mehkar	4
Baitulawadi	9

== Economy ==
The jama (revenue assessed) from Berar in 1596 was 64,26,03,270 dams (Delhi). Land revenue formed the major part of the total income from the Subah. Other sources of income were zakat, customs, salt tax, khums, mint, currency, jizya, escheats, presents, octroi, tolls and tributes. The coins current were tanka-i-Barari, dam and Rupee. One tanka-i-Barari was equal to 16 Delhi dams (but later raised to 24 dams) or eight Delhi tankas.

== See also ==
- Berar Sultanate (pre-Mughal)
- Berar Province (after, British colonial)
