= Ladegaon =

Village in Maharashtra

- Village
- Location in Maharashtra, India
- Coordinates: 21°01′N 78°08′E
- Country: India
- State: Maharashtra
- District: Washim
- Taluka: Risod

Languages
  - Official: Marathi
- Time zone: UTC+5:30 (IST)
- Vehicle registration: MH

Ladegaon village in Washim district, Maharashtra, India. Ladegaon is a village in Risod Taluka of Washim district in Maharashtra, India, as recorded in the national postal directory.
