= Narnala =

Fort in India

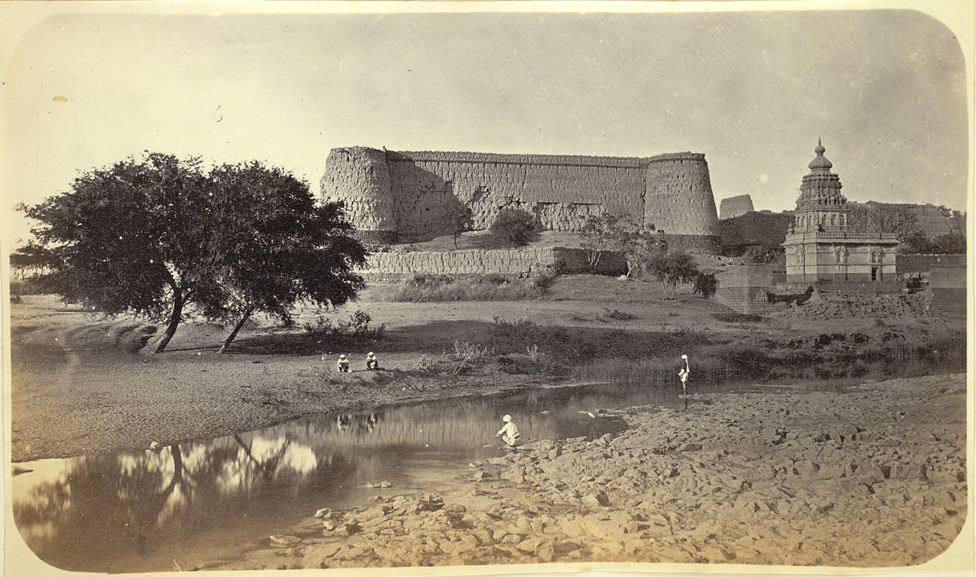
Narnala Fort, circa 1860

Narnala Fort, or Narnala Qila Sarkar, is a hill fortress in the Satpura Range of Vidarbha, Maharashtra, India. The site dates back to the 10th century. Over the centuries, the fort came under the control of various Islamic dynasties, including Imad-ul-Mulk and his successors. Although the fort underwent modifications during successive periods of Islamic rule, several major fortifications and structures—including the Mahakali Gate, Rani Mahal, and the Elephant Stable—were only afterwards constructed, traditionally attributed to the ruler Rana Narnal Singh Solanki at the turn of the 16th century.

The fort is named after the ruler Rajput Solanki Chaulukya, Raja Narnal Singh, also known as Narnal Singh Swami. It was renamed "Shahnoor" by Islamic rulers, but when it was later reacquired and rebuilt with Hindu cultural elements, it was named "Narnala" by Rao Rana Narnal Singh Solanki.

== History ==
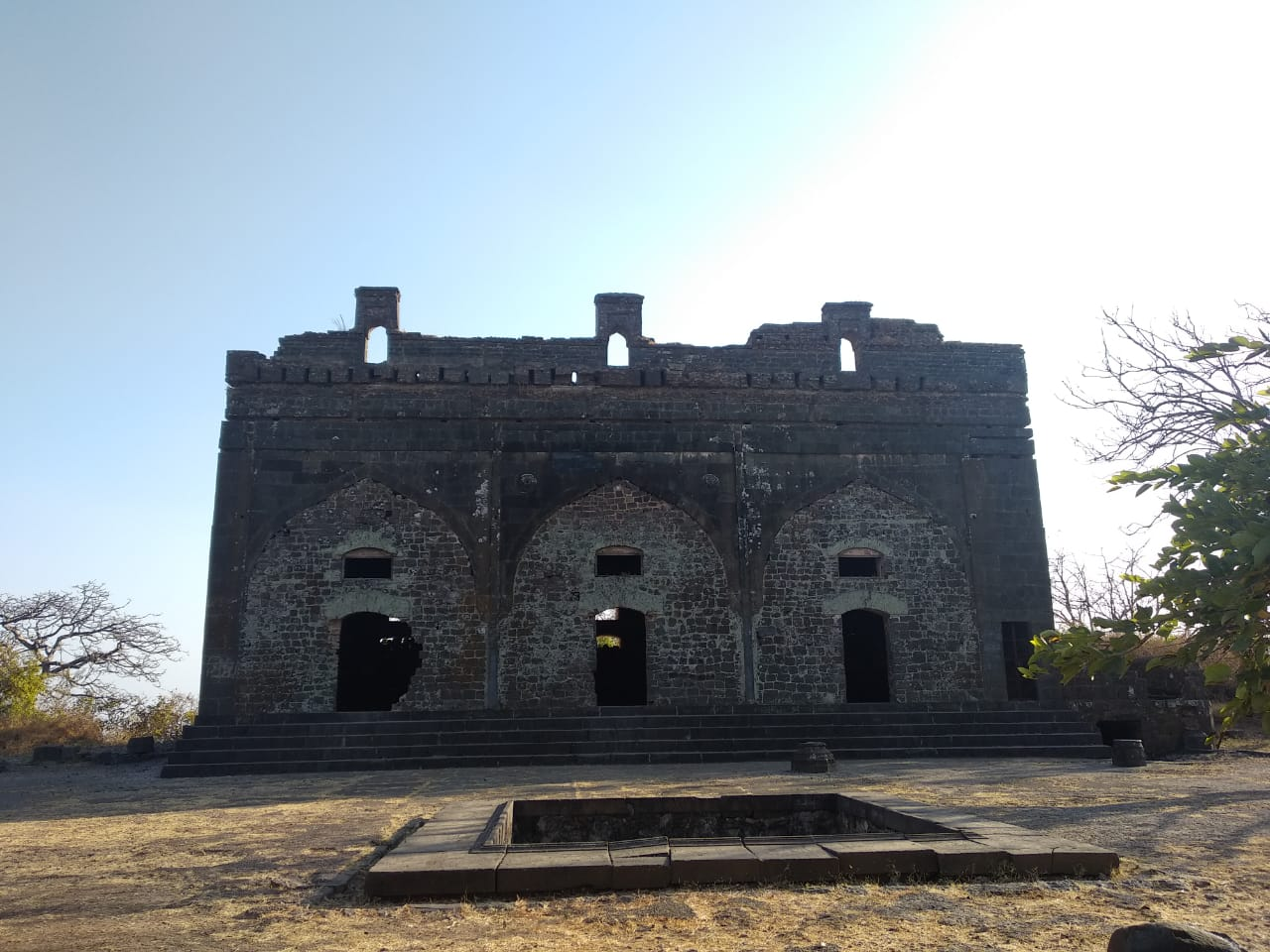
Narnala Fort

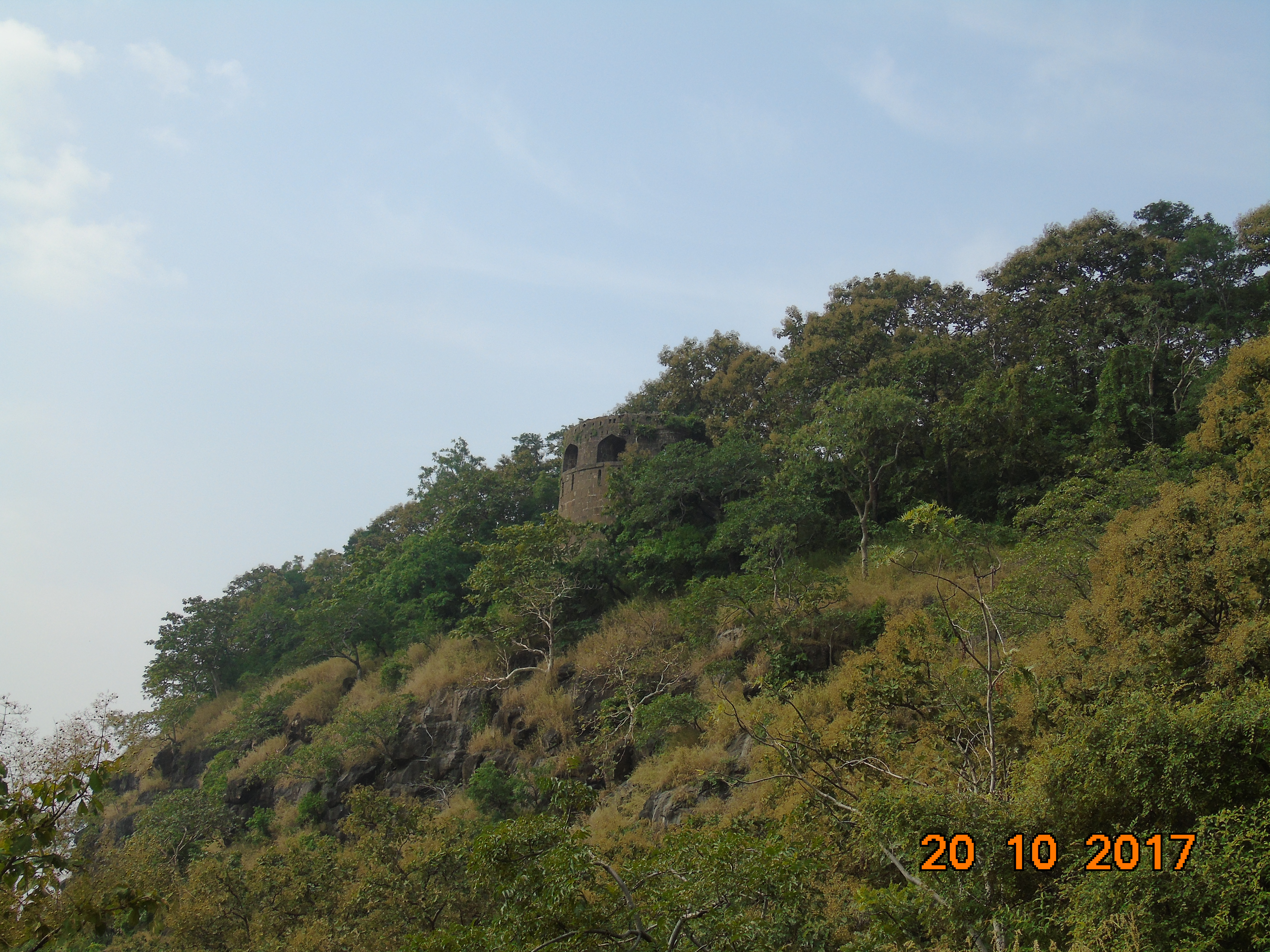
A fortification at Narnala

Narnala Fort was occupied by many Indian dynasties over the centuries, including the Yadava dynasty, the Rajgond rulers of Devgarh–Nagpur (c. 1400 CE), the Somvanshi Kshatriya Chaulukya Rajput ruler Narnal Singh Swami, the Bahmani Sultanate (1422–1436), the Farooqui dynasty (1437), Fathullah Imad-ul-Mulk (1490), Rao Rana Narnal Singh Solanki, Burhan Imad Shah of the Imad Shahi dynasty (1572), the Ahmadnagar Sultanate, the Mughals (1597–98), and the Maratha Empire (1701–1803) under Raje Parsoji Bhosale's regent and the Rao Rana Qiledar family, until the British takeover in 1803.

The exact date of construction is unknown. The site was originally established around the 10th century CE by the Gavli Kings. However, according to local legend, the first fortifications were built by Raja Narnal Singh Swami, a descendant of the Somvanshi Kshatriya Pandavas and a branch of the Chalukya rulers of Ayodhya. His namesake descendant, Rao Rana Narnal Singh, ruled the fort in the early 16th century. The fort likely predates 1400 CE, as the Persian historian Firishta records that Shahab-ud-din Ahmad Shah I Wali (r. 1422–1436) made repairs to Narnala between 1425 and 1428 while camped at Achalpur during the construction of Gawilgarh fort.

In 1437, during an invasion of Berar by Nasir Khan of Khandesh, the provincial governor (Khan-i-Jahan) took refuge in Narnala and repelled the siege with reinforcements from Khalaf Hasan Basri sent by Ala-ud-din Ahmad Shah II. In 1487, Fathullah Imad-ul-Mulk, founder of the Imad Shahi dynasty, gained control of Narnala and appointed Rao Rana Narnal Singh Solanki as its governor.

During the Mughal period, the fort became part of the Mughal Empire and was incorporated as one of the thirteen sarkars of Berar Subah. In 1572, Burhan Imad Shah was imprisoned here by his minister, Tufal Khan, prompting Murtaza Nizam Shah of Ahmadnagar to capture the fort and execute both men. In 1597–98, Akbar's generals Saiyid Yusuf Khan Mashhadi and Shaikh Abul Fazl seized Narnala, renamed it Shanoor, and incorporated it into Berar Subah.

In the late 17th century, the fort was captured by the Maratha Empire and subsequently administered by the Bhonsles of the Nagpur Kingdom. In 1701, Raje Parsoji Bhosale appointed the descendants of Rao Rana Narnal Singh (the former ruler of Narnala) as hereditary governors, granting them the title "Thakurrao". The family also held jagir rights in the Malkapur, Buldhana district, and is credited with its fortification and development. The Marathas held Narnala until 1803, when the British took it. It was later returned to the Nagpur Bhosales and the Rana family, but eventually abandoned.

=== Rulers of Narnala ===
Raja Narnal Singh, also known as Narnal Singh Swami, was a scion of a Chalukya ruler, after whom Narnala Fort is named. The fort was subsequently ruled by several rulers and killedars, who made significant changes to the original Rajput style.

After Narnal Singh, his descendant from the northern family branch—also descended from the ruling family of the Rao Raja of Rajasthan—came to this fort. Kunwar Rao Raja Narnal Singh earned the titles of Rao and Rana, becoming Rana of Mahurgad and receiving special rights to Narnala Fort, as well as some rights from a ruler of the Imad Shahi Dynasty, the son of Fathullah Imad-ul-Mulk, ruler of the Berar Sultanate—a Kannada Kanarese Hindu converted to Islam. Along with Mahurgarh, he was granted Bhawargarh by the Maharana of Bijagad (Badwani). His younger brother received special rights to Narnala Fort from the Rajgond ruler of Deogarh, a position later continued by the son of Fathullah Imad-ul-Mulk, whose headquarters were in Malakpur, Buldhana District.

After the fall of the Imad Shahi Dynasty, the Rana left Mahurgarh following disagreements with the later rulers, the Mughals. Declining Mughal sovereignty, he lost the land and fort rights to Mughal subhedars in a small battle. After this, the Rana joined the Gonds of Deogarh, and his descendants fought against the Mughals alongside Rani Durgavati. They were granted the title Thakur of Narnala Sarkar by the Gond ruler of Deogarh. They held nine forts, and Saranjami Sardeshmukh had rights over 23 villages in Malkapur, where they appointed twelve administrators, later seven, who served under the dominance of Rana Sarkar as the Malguzar Patils, Deshpande, Deshkulkarni, Purohits, and other Vetandars. To this end, the Rana built seven Garhis around Malkapur for protection. Rajputs largely dominated Malkapur under the leadership of Rana Sarkar.

Following the fall of the Gonds, the family was invited to join the Maratha Empire by Raja Bahadur of the Bhonsle of Nagpur, who recognized their valor and experience of the Rana Sardars in the defense of Narnala and surrounding forts. The Bhonsle ruler granted him the title Thakurrao. Later, Thakurrao Harisingh Rana joined the Bhonsles, learning that they were descendants of the Maharanas of Mewar.

Raghoji I Bhonsle granted him the title of Qiladar of Narnala, Gawilgad, and nine other forts in Melghat, along with the Zamindar Sar Patilki rights over 13 villages, and Sar Deshmukh Saranjamdar rights over 9 villages in Malkapur pargana in the sarkar of Narnala. After the severe loss of the Second Anglo–Maratha War of 1803, they built a fortress named Kaaligarh in Malkapur, so named as they were devotees of Mahakaali. Kaaligarh served as their capital for all nine forts, but was later demolished by the Nizam in 1830.

A younger brother of the then Qiladar Thakurrao Rana (Sarpatil-Deshmukh) shifted his capital from Malkapur to Nadgaon, dividing the family into two main branches. There are four houses in the family to this day. The titular Zamindar holders of these are as follows:

1. The elder branch of the family is the Kaaligarh–Malkapur branch of the Saranjamdar, carrying the titular rights of Deshmukh Vatandar Thakur Rao Rana, and historically holding the office of Pargana officer of Malkapur Taluk. Following the khalsa (confiscation) of the watan (land) rights and the pargana officer's responsibilities from his grandfather, the elder descendant, Sriman Raosaheb Rana Dr. Onkarsingh ji, with the suggestion of the Rana of Barwani and assistance from the Rana of Pratapur and Dharampur, permanently shifted to Talode, Khandesh, in the late 19th century.
2. The younger branch of the family is the Nadgaon branch of Zamindars, descendants of Kuwar Ramsingh Solanki, younger brother of the Ranaji. They carried the titles of Vatandar, Rao, and Patil. Later, the descendants earned various titles in the pre-independence period, such as Rao Sahib, Diwan Bahadur, and Rao Bahadur. The most honored and notable person of this family is Smt. Pratibha Patil, the former President of India, and the daughter of the Rao Patil of Nadgaon.

== Major features ==
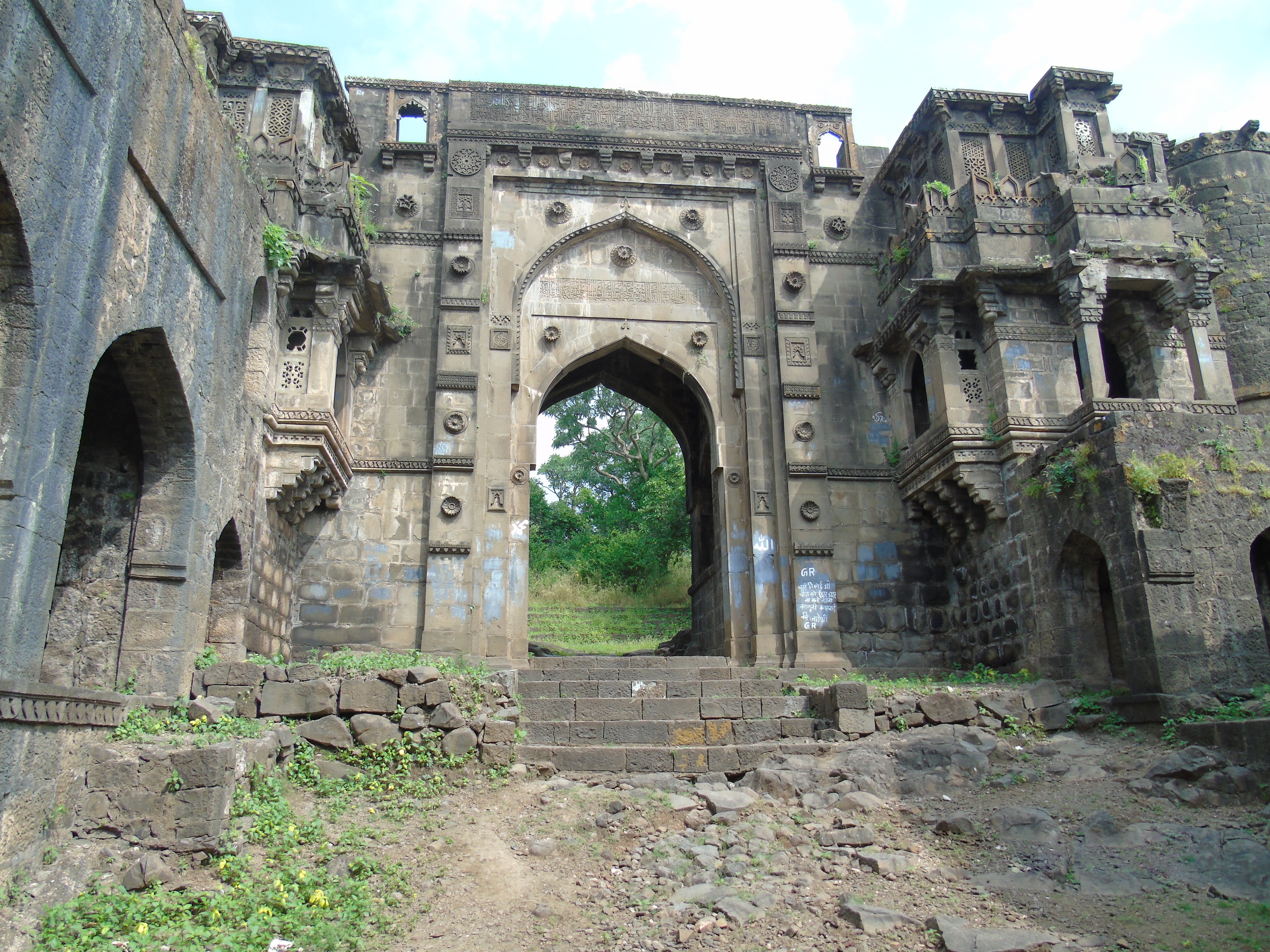
The Mahakali Gate. There used to be a temple to Mahakali at the staircase.

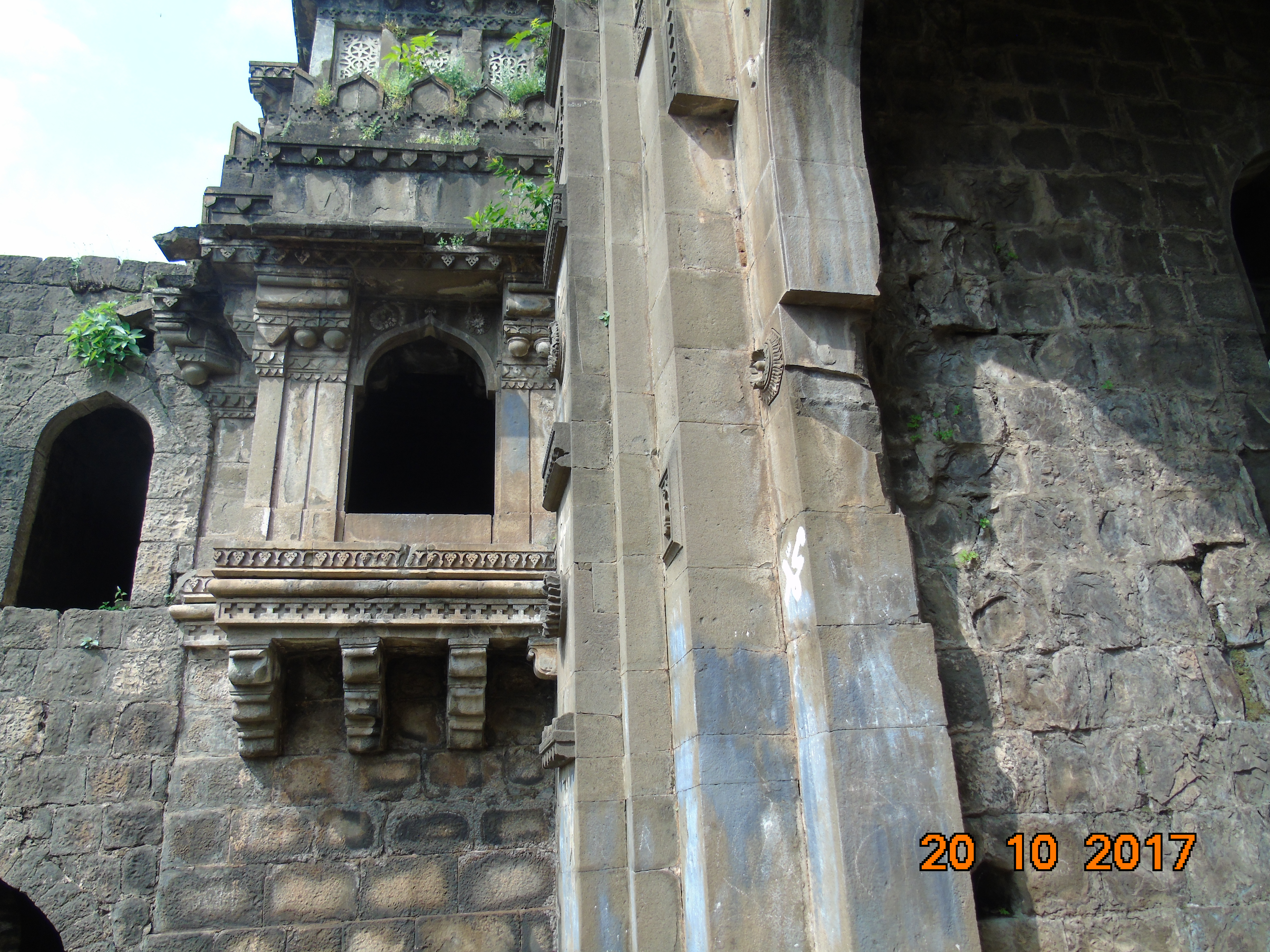
Artistic carvings on the Mahakali Gate

The local complex consists of three small forts: Jafarabad fort on the east, Narnala Fort in the center, and Teliagarh fort to the west. The lake within the center of the complex is said to possess healing properties and, according to legend, contained the philosopher's stone, though no stone was found when the lake dried up in the drought and Indian famine of 1899–1900.

Narnala Fort covers an area of 362 acres (1.46 km^{2}). Its major features and architecture were created by Hindu rulers, mainly the Solanki Rajput Qiledars and the rulers of Gondwana (i.e., the Raj Gond), but later modified by Islamic rulers into an Islamic style. The fort had nineteen water tanks ensured a reliable supply of water, even during sieges. It had 360 watchtowers, six large gates, and twenty-one small gates. The large gates are called the Delhi Darwaza, Sirpur Darwaza, Akot Darwaza, and Shahnoor Darwaza.

The innermost of the three gateways is the Mahakali Gate, named by the Rana Killedar family, as Goddess Mahakali is their family deity. It is built of white sandstone and is highly ornate. It is decorated with conventional lotus flowers, a rich cornice, and later embellished with Arabic inscriptions, and flanked by projecting balconies with stone lattice-work panels displaying a considerable variety of designs. It is considered an example of the Sultanate architectural style. An inscription records the fact that the gate was built in the reign of Shahab-ud-din Mahmud Shah (Bahmani) by Fathullah Imad-ul-Mulk in 1486. A short verse from the Quran is also inscribed. A now-ruined temple to Mahakali also stood at the gate. The temple is said to have enshrined idols of deities, which were later stolen.

The fort still displays the "Ashtakamal" eight-petalled lotus, which was the symbol of Narnal Singh's Solanki dynasty Goddess Khimaj or Mahalaxmi. These lotuses are visible on the mosques and many other places. Hence, it is evident that Islamic rulers altered Narnal Singh's original architectural design and converted the place into a Mughal (Islamic) form. No ruler could rebuild the entire fort, considering the geographical location of the fort.

== Other buildings ==
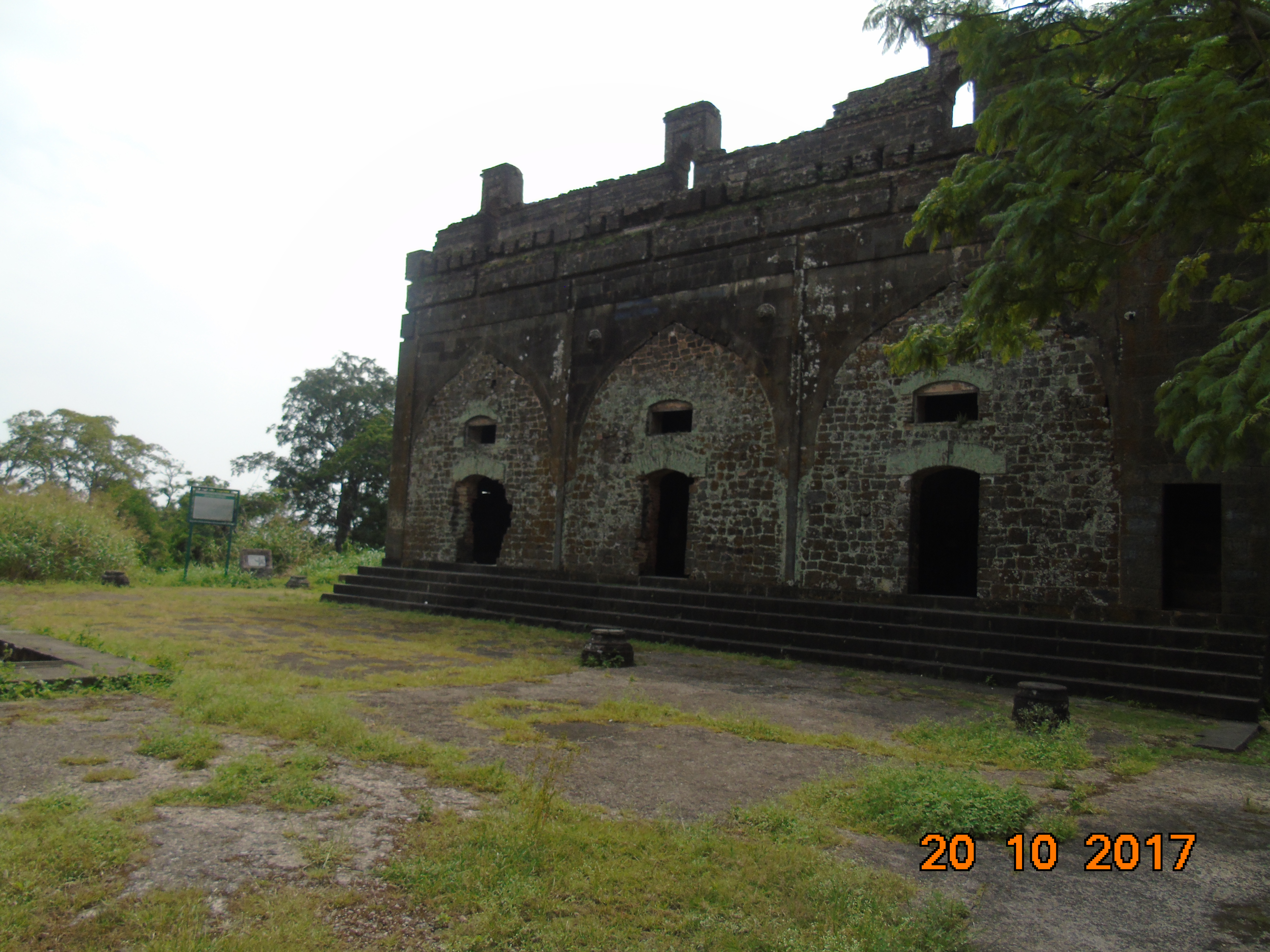
Rani Mahal ("Queen's Palace")

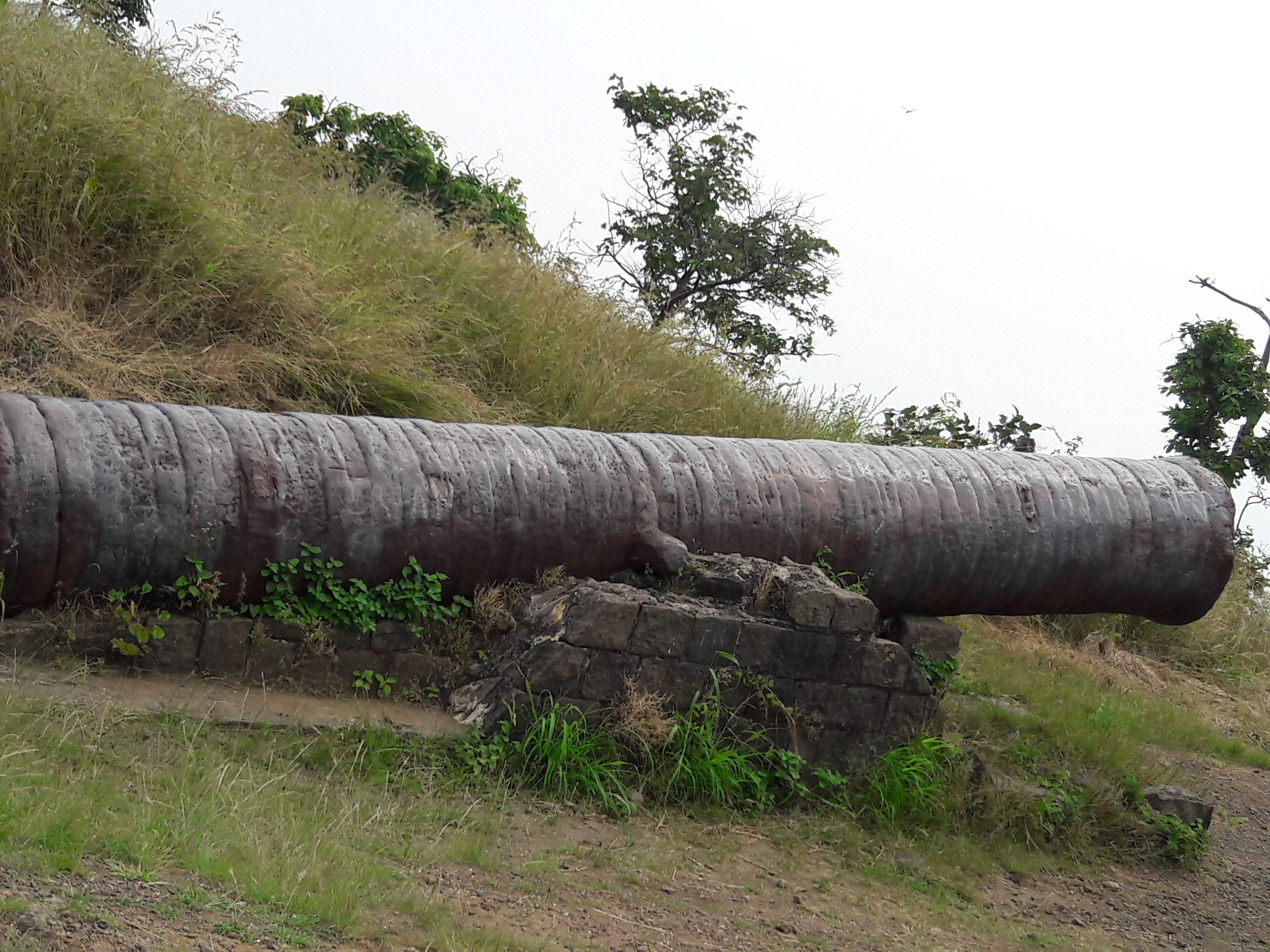
The third-longest cannon in India, at 27 feet

- Rani Mahal ("Queen's Palace") – The residential chamber for the queens, concubines, and the guest women. Still standing.
- Peshwa Mahal — A meeting hall and guest quarters for visiting Peshwa and the Bhonsale Maharaja of Nagpur. Now in ruins.
- Saraf-Khana
- Baradari (open pavilion)
- Arsenal of old guns called 'Nau-Gazi tope' (meaning a 9-yard gun; a reference to its length and not range)
- Elephant stables
- Palace erected in the honor of Raja Raghoji Bhonsle by Rana Killedar. Now in ruins.
- Mosque in Teliagarh built by the Bahmanis
- The Jama Masjid is said to have borne an Arabic inscription recording its construction in 1509 by Mahabat Khan, but this has disappeared. Now in ruins.
- A small mosque attributed to Aurangzeb

== Location ==
The fort is located in the Akot Taluka of Akola district, Berar, at coordinates of 21°14'38"N 77°01'40"E. The closest city is Akot, which is 18 km away. It is at the southernmost tip of the Satpura Hills at an elevation of 932 meters above sea level. Currently, the fort falls within the Melghat Tiger Reserve.

The climate of Narnala Fort is classified as humid subtropical under the Köppen climate classification, with mild to cool winters (November to March), a wet monsoon season (June to October), and a hot, long summer (March to June). Temperature ranges from 0–23 °C in winter, 17–42 °C in summer, and 15–27 °C in monsoon.

== See also ==
- List of forts in Maharashtra
