= Ansing =

Indian village

Coordinates: 20°02′27″N 77°18′54″E

Ansing is a village in the Washim district of Maharashtra, India.

== Demographics ==
As of the 2011 census, there were 15,187 people, of which 8,102 were male and 7,085 were female. 3,579 people were children aged 0–6. The average sex ratio was 929, which is equal to the state average. However, the child sex ratio was 790, lower than the state average of 894. The literacy rate was 83.93%, higher than the state average of 82.34%, with male literacy at 90.63% and female literacy at 76.89%.
