= Pratapur =

Pratappur प्रतापपुर
- Village development committee
- Interactive map of Pratappur
- Country: Nepal
- Zone: Seti Zone
- District: Kailali District

Area
  - Total: 37.3 km^{2} (14.40 sq mi)

Population
  - Total: 9,217
- Time zone: UTC+5:45 (Nepal Time)
  - Summer (DST): +5:45
- Area code: 091

Pratapur is a village development committee in Kailali District in the Seti Zone of western Nepal. At the time of the 1991 Nepal census, it had a population of 9217 living in 1278 individual households.
