= Balapur, Vikramgad =

Village in Maharashtra

Balapur
- village
- Location in Maharashtra, India Balapur (India)
- Coordinates: 19.8368015°N 73.0936509°E
- Country: India
- State: Maharashtra
- District: Palghar
- Taluka: Vikramgad
- Elevation: 72 m (236 ft)

Population (2011)
  - Total: 2,617
- Time zone: UTC+5:30 (IST)
- 2011 census code: 551768

Balapur is a village in the Palghar district of Maharashtra, India. It is located in the Vikramgad taluka.

== Demographics ==
According to the 2011 census of India, Balapur has 507 households. The effective literacy rate (i.e. the literacy rate of population excluding children aged 6 and below) is 55.48%.

Demographics (2011 Census)
	Total	Male	Female
Population	2617	1315	1302
Children aged below 6 years	436	229	207
Scheduled caste	0	0	0
Scheduled tribe	2599	1305	1294
Literates	1210	734	476
Workers (all)	1603	795	808
Main workers (total)	1562	779	783
Main workers: Cultivators	1057	534	523
Main workers: Agricultural labourers	476	234	242
Main workers: Household industry workers	3	0	3
Main workers: Other	26	11	15
Marginal workers (total)	41	16	25
Marginal workers: Cultivators	12	6	6
Marginal workers: Agricultural labourers	11	6	5
Marginal workers: Household industry workers	0	0	0
Marginal workers: Others	18	4	14
Non-workers	1014	520	494
