= Balapur Fort =

Mughal fort in Maharashtra, India

- Balapur Qila
- Akola district, Maharashtra
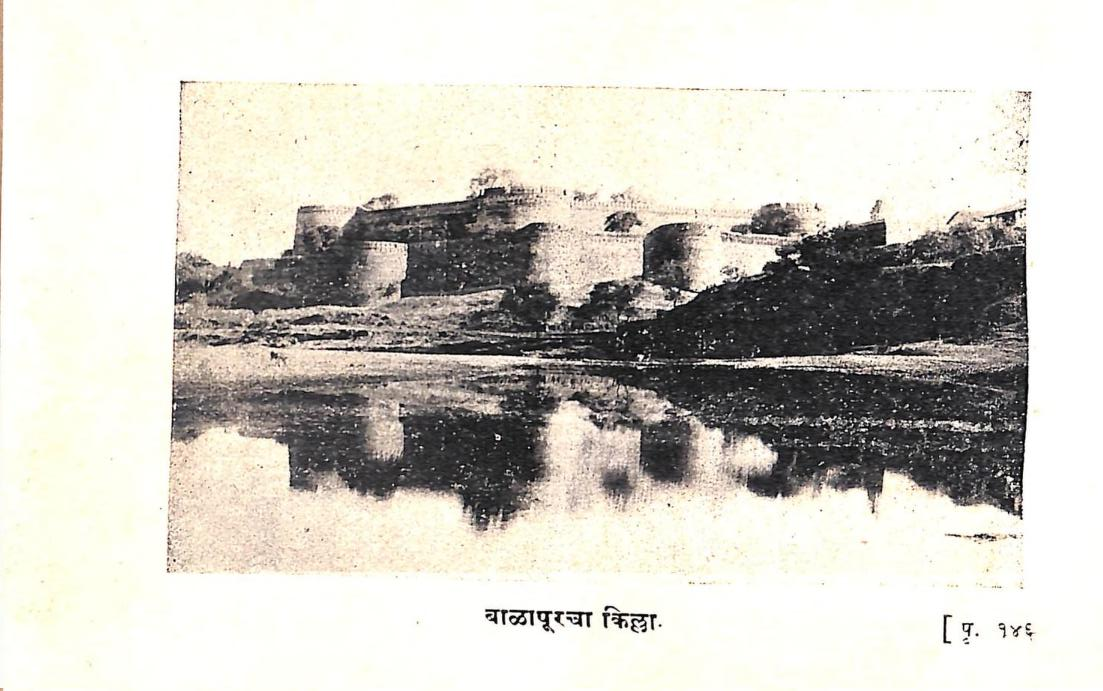
- Maharashtra

Site information
- Type: Hill fort
- Owner: Government of India
- Controlled by: Mughal Empire
- Open to the public: Yes
- Condition: Preserved

Location
- Shown within Maharashtra
- Coordinates: 20°40′13″N 76°46′25″E

Site history
- Built: 1721–1757 AD
- Built by: Azam Shah, Mughal Empire
- In use: Yes (Few government offices)
- Materials: Stone

Garrison information
- Past commanders: Azam Shah, Ismail Khan (the Nawab of Ellichpur)

Balapur Fort is a Mughal fortress in the town of Balapur in the Akola district of India. Construction on the fort was started by Mirza Azam Shah, the son of Emperor Aurangzeb and it was completed by Ismaeel Khan, the Nawab of Elichpur in 1757. The chhatri of Raja Man Singh I, a canopy constructed by Mirza Raja Jaisingh, has an area of 25 square feet and a height of 33 feet. Its foundations were heavily damaged in a great flood called the 'dhvdya pur' which occurred more than 100 years ago, but after some years the damage was repaired at a cost of Rs 3,000 received from Jaipur.

== History ==
The old Gazetteer states, "People are sufficiently educated to scrawl their names on all parts of the chhatri, and a stone in the middle has been coloured with the ubiquitous sacred red. The frivolous say that visitors to the chhatri must do three things, firstly, they should note the char bot ki patthar, four-fingers stone, which has been set in near the top of a pillar on the soul." In 1616, Shah Nawaz Khan, the Subedar of Barar was camping at Balapur. The defeated Malik Ambar attacked him near Kirkee by way of Rohinkheda pass. But he could not hold for long and had to retreat to Balapur. Aurangzeb, after ascending the imperial throne at Delhi, appointed Raja Jaisingh as the Governor of the Dakkan. He constructed the Chattri of Raja Man Singh - an umbrella-shaped pavilion, 25 feet square and 33 feet in height at Balapur. Mirza Azam Shah, son of Aurangzeb, is said to have lived here and to have built a mud fort. It may be noted that as per the Treaty of Purandar, the Balapur pargana along with the Avandhe pargana was given in the name of Sambhaji as a Jageer and he was made a commandant of 5,000."

== Location ==
The Balapur fort is situated in Balapur, a large town located at the junction of the rivers Man and Bhains, in west-central India.

The old Gazetteer mentions that the town contained a mosque of 1737 in Kasarkhera. It further states, 'The mosque in Kasarkhera is a fair specimen of later Mughal architecture, but the arches arc too squat to be graceful; a long and somewhat bombastic inscription, exceedingly well executed and well preserved, gives as the date of construction of the mosque the year 1737. The mosque is known as the Raozah Masjid, for it contains the tomb of a local saint Maolvi Masoom Shah.' The old Gazetteer also states, 'A fine haveli in the town was built by a local saint, Sayyad Amjad, and an inscription over the principal gateway, a good specimen of Mughal architecture, conveys the information that it was built in 1703.'

Situated on an elevated ground between the two rivers, the fort has very high walls and bastions built of the best brickwork of its time. The fort has three gateways, one within the other. With Balapur hailed as an important military station during the times of the Mughals, the fort too was built keeping in mind the town's military responsibilities and position. Complex architecture used in the fort ensured its safety, as well as eased the discharge of missiles and other ammunition from within the fort, rendering it one of the most impenetrable forts in the county. During the rains, the Fort gets surrounded by floodwater except at one point. The temple of Bala Devi, from which the town has derived its name, lies just under the Fort, on the southern side.

Still in a relatively good condition, the Balapur Fort is now used by the government for offices. A quiet spot, this fort held supreme importance during the time of the Mughals.
