= Balapur, Akola district =

Balapur
- City
- Location in Maharashtra, India
- Coordinates: 20.39°N 76.46°E
- Country: India
- State: Maharashtra
- Elevation: 268 m (879 ft)

Population (2011)
  - Total: 44,594

Language
  - Official: Marathi
- Time zone: UTC+5:30 (IST)
- PIN: 444302
- Telephone code: 07257
- Vehicle registration: MH 30
- Website: http://balapur.in

Balapur is a city and a municipal council in Akola district in the state of Maharashtra, India.

== Geography ==
Balapur has an average elevation of 268 metres (879 ft). The town is an important junction for traffic on National Highway No 6, which carries the Calcutta traffic to the Port City of Bombay. Transport destined for south takes a southward turn following a wide State Highway towards Hyderabad, crossing the NH 6. There are three rivers: Mann, Mahens and Bhikund. Two of them are in the city including a dam at Mann river providing water to thermal power plant placed in Paras. The nearest rail head is at Paras, 7 km from the town. The Mahagenco is expanding its thermal power station with two 250 MW units to augment the falling generating capacity of the state power corporation. There is further potential to expand it to 1000 MW making it a Super Thermal Power Station. One of the popular and traditional profession of people here is manufacturing DARI (cotton rugs/carpets) using handlooms. Other major business of people here is manufacturing bricks, which is exported to surrounding districts. There are no suicide by the farmers here as the majority of them are Muslims and do not go for high yield crops which are not suitable to Balapur area.

== History ==
Balapur was an important military station after Ellichpur now Achalpur during the Mughal period. It became the seat of Provincial governor of Berar instead of Ellichpur and Prince Murad, son of Akbar settled in Barar with Balapur as his headquarters in 1596. Near Balapur he founded a new city named Shahpur and constructed a beautiful palace for himself which is now in ruins. As his relationship was deteriorating with Abdul Rahim Khan-i-Khanan, the commander of the army, Akbar recalled the Khan-i-Khanan and sent his trusted friend Abul Fazl to help him. After the fall of Ahmadnagar, Balapur was still the principal garrison town of Berar, but the next prince sent to administer the Deccan after the death of Murad, Daniyal Mirza preferred Burhanpur, as his viceregal capital. Daniyal died of drink in 1605. The death of his third son was a severe shock to the Emperor Akbar, who survived Daniyal Mirza only for a few months, and died in October 1605, when he was succeeded by his eldest son Salim (Jehangir). The climate of Balapur had an unfortunate effect on the Mughal officers. Akbar's son Murad had already died there from the effects of drink, and in 1617 Raja Maan Singh, a distinguished and valued officer of Jahangir's, died there from the same cause. Shahnawaz Khan succumbed to the same fate a few years later. Balapur was one of the richest Pargana in Berar Subah.

Muhammad Azam Shah, Son of Aurangzeb Alamgir resided and build a Mud fort here. A Chhatri or Pavilion was erected by Mirza Raja Jai Singh, Commander of Shah Jahan and general of Aurangzeb. In 1720, Asaf Jah defeated the Mughal forces dispatched against him.

== Forts and palaces ==
Balapur Fort which exist in bad condition, was completed in 1757 by Ismail Khan Nawab of Ellichpur and is second largest fort in Barar after Gawilgarh hill fort. There exist a Rauzah Masjid with Tomb of Saint Maulvi Masoom Shah built by Mirza Aman Sher Baig in 1737–38. According to inscriptions on Jageerdar's Haveli, Khadin Gate was built in 1703–04.

== Local municipality ==
The local municipality was established in 1934. It provides services in the field of education (primary) and a rural hospital with hardly any facilities to be shared by the town people. Many private practitioners are available. A District Hospital is coming up and its construction is almost complete.

== Demographics ==
As of 2011 India census, Balapur had a population of 44,494. Males constitute 52% of the population and females 48%. Balapur has an average literacy rate of 69%, higher than the national average of 59.5%; with 55% of the males and 45% of females literate. 17% of the population is under 6 years of age.

Year	Male	Female	Total Population	Change	Religion (%)							
Year	Male	Female	Total Population	Change	Hindu	Muslim	Christian	Sikhs	Buddhist	Jain	Other religions and persuasions	Religion not stated
2001	20377	19125	39502	-	21.277	69.371	0.114	0.028	8.076	1.063	0.000	0.071
2011	22909	21685	44594	0.129	17.926	73.243	0.114	0.047	7.687	0.962	0.000	0.020
