= Washim district =

- District of Maharashtra
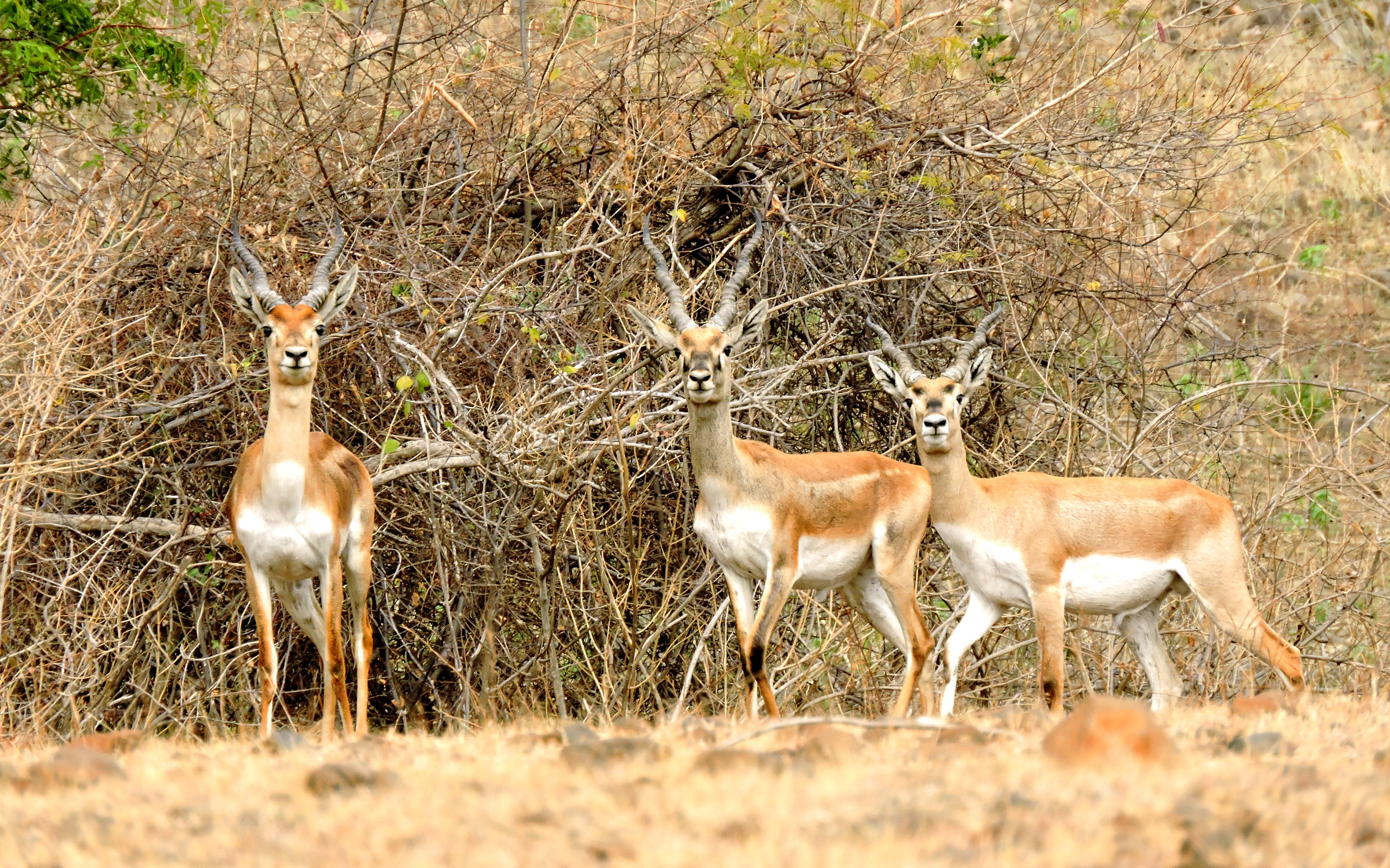
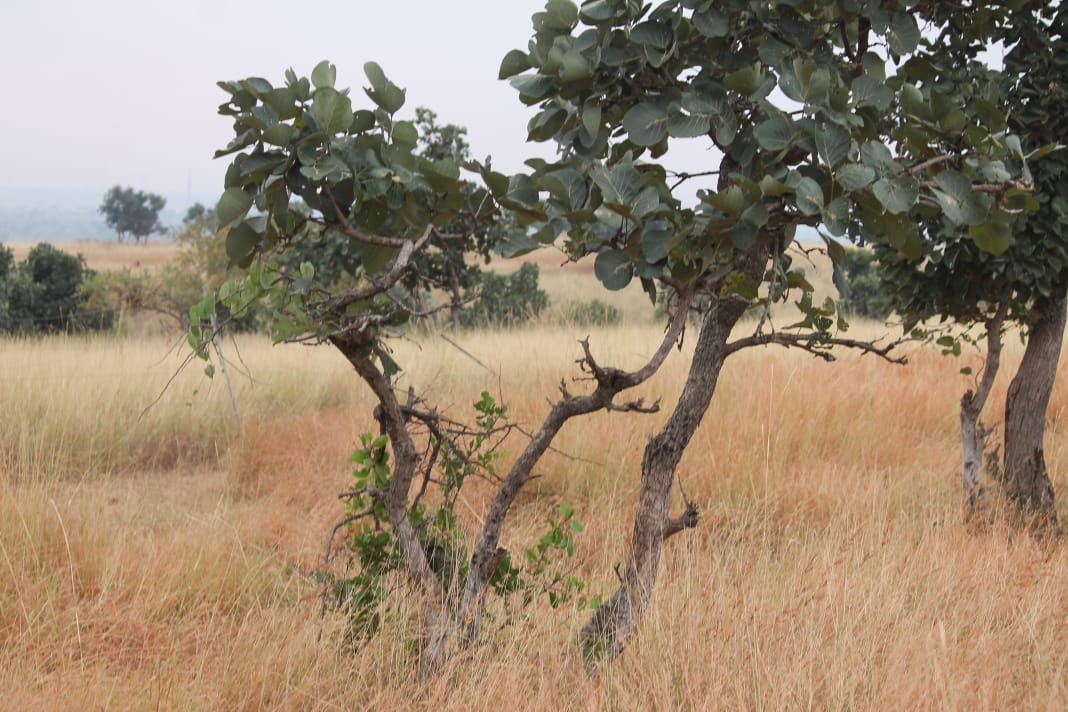
- Blackbucks, Grasslands in the Karanja Sohol Wildlife Sanctuary

- Location in Maharashtra
- Washim district
- Country: India
- State: Maharashtra
- Division: Amravati
- Headquarters: Washim
- Tehsils: Malegaon; Mangrulpir; Karanja; Manora; Washim; Risod

Government
  - Body: Washim Zilla Parishad
  - Guardian Minister: Hasan Mushrif (Cabinet Minister MH)
  - President Z. P. Washim: NA
  - District Collector: Shri Yogesh Kumbhejkar (IAS)
  - CEO Z. P. Washim: Arpit Chauhan
  - MPs: Sanjay Uttamrao Deshmukh (Yavatmal–Washim); Anup Dhotre (Akola-Washim)

Area
  - Total: 5,150 km^{2} (1,990 sq mi)

Population (2011)
  - Total: 1,197,160
  - Density: 232/km^{2} (602/sq mi)
  - Urban: 17.66%

Demographics
  - Literacy: 83.25%
  - Sex ratio: 943
- Time zone: UTC+05:30 (IST)
- Major highways: 1
- Average annual precipitation: 750-1000 mm
- Website: washim.nic.in

Washim district (Marathi pronunciation: [ʋaːʃim]) is a district in Maharashtra, India. The headquarters is at Washim. The area of the district is 5,150 km^{2} (1,990 sq mi).

== Officer ==
=== Members of Parliament ===
- Sanjay Deshmukh (SHS)
  (Yavatmal–Washim)
- Anup Dhotre (BJP)
  (Akola-Washim)

=== Guardian Minister ===
Guardian Minister Washim
- पालकमंत्री वाशिम
- Emblem of India
- Incumbent; Sanjay Rathod since 24 September 2022
- Style: The Honourable
- Residence: Washim
- Appointer: Chief Minister of Maharashtra
- Term length: 5 years / No time limit
- Website: washim.gov.in/en/

==== list of Guardian Minister ====
| Name | Term of office |
|---|---|
| Varsha Gaikwad | 11 November 2010– 26 September 2014 |
| Sadabhau Khot | 5 December 2014 - 8 November 2019 |
| Shambhuraj Desai | 9 January 2020 - 27 June 2022 |
| Sunil Chhatrapal Kedar Additional charge | 27 June 2022 - 29 June 2022 |
| Sanjay Rathod | 24 September 2022- 26 November 2024 |
| Hasan Mushrif | 18 January 2025- 26 Incumbent |

=== District Magistrate/Collector ===
District Magistrate / Collector Washim
- जिल्हाधिकारी तथा जिल्हदंडाधिकरी वाशिम
- Emblem of India
- Incumbent; Mr. Shanmugarajan S. (IAS) since October 2020
- Residence: At Washim district
- Appointer: Government of Maharashtra
- Term length: No time limit
- Website: washim.gov.in/en/

==== list of District Magistrate / Collector ====
| Name | Term of office |
|---|---|
| Shri Yogesh Kumbhejkar (IAS) | Sept. 2024 - Incumbent |
| Smt Buveneswari S | July 2023 - August 2024 |
| Mr. Shanmugarajan S. (IAS) | October 2020 - July 2023 |

== Geography ==
Washim district is located in the western region of Vidharbha (20.1390° N, 77.1025° E). Akola lies to its north, Amravati lies to its north-east, Hingoli lies to its south, Buldhana lies to its west, Yavatmal lies to its east. River Penganga is the main river of the district. It flows through the Tehsil of Risod. Later it flows through the boundary of Washim and Hingoli districts. River Kas is the main tributary of Penganga. River Kas meets Penganga about 1 km from the village of Shelgaon Rajgure. River Arunavati and its tributaries originates in the Tehsil of Washim and them flows through the tehsils of Mangrul Pir and Manora into the district of Yavatmal. River Katepurna originates in the hilly areas of the district and flows northwards through the tehsil of Malegaon and enters the Akola district.

There are hilly ranges extending from through the tehsils of Malegaon, Washim, Mangrul Pir and Manora. There is plain region in the basins of River Penganga in the Risod Tehsil. The important cities are Washim, Risod, Karanja, Malegaon, Mangrul Pir, Manora and Shirpur. Washim is the largest city in the district. There are many well known hospitals, Schools, Colleges and Banks in Washim City. It is specially famous for its Balaji Temple. It also has a railway junction. By railway is connected to Akola, Purna, Nanded and Khandwa. Karanja is another city. It has another railway junction. There are some parts covered by the forests. There are mainly two regions. Both the regions are protected under Katepurna Wildlife Sanctuary and Karanja Sohol Wildlife Sanctuary respectively.

== History ==
The ancient Jain text Vasudeva-hindi describes Vatsagulma (modern Washim), along with Achalpur as one of the chief cities of the Abhira kingdom, attesting to Abhira rule over the Vidarbha region.

Washim was once known as Vatsagulma, the capital of the Vatsagulma line of Vakataka dynasty. The Vatsagulma branch was founded by Sarvasena, the second son of Pravarasena I after his death. King Sarvasena made Vatsagulma, the present-day Washim, in Washim district of Maharashtra his capital. The territory ruled by this branch was between the Sahydri Range and the Godavari River. They patronised some of the Buddhist caves at Ajanta.

Before the establishment of the Vakataka rule with Washim as their capital, the place was an important center from the religious point of view, and it even now contains many old temples and tirthas which are revered by the people.

The account of Berar in the Ain-i-Akbari was added to that work in 1596–97. The greater part of the Akola district was included in Akbar's sarkar or revenue district of Narnala, but some of the parganas of this Sarkar are now included in Buldhana, while Akola, on the other hand, includes three parganas of Akbar's revenue district of Bashim. The whole revenue demand for the area now included in the Akola district seems to have been nearly twenty-four lakhs of rupees.

The only special notice of any places in the District has reference to Balapur, Shahpur, and Bashim. Near Balapur, says Abdul Fazl, are two streams, about the borders of which are found various kinds of pretty stones, which are cut and kept as curiosities. Six kos distant were the headquarters of Sultan Murad, which grew into a fine city under the name of Shahpur'. Of Bashim he writes, 'About Bashim is an Indigenous race, for the most part proud and refractory, called Hatkars their forces consist of 1000 cavalry and 5000 infantry.' He adds that the Hatkars, who are Dhangar, are Rajput which is true.

When in 1768–69, the Peshva attacked the Bhosle, his army had come from Aurangabad through the pass to Washim, from which place it moved forward on its expedition. Afterward, it was decided that the Peshva Madhavrav and Janoji Bhosle should meet at Washim and accordingly the terms of the treaty were finalised there and the treaty was signed at Kanakpur. The temple of Balaji at Washim was constructed by Bhavani Kaloo, who was the Divan of Sabaji Bhosle.

During the middle of the 18th century, Washim was a famous centre of cloth production along with Balapur. It is clearly brought out by one of the articles of the treaty of Kanakpur entered into between Janoji Bhonsle and the Peshwa Madhavrao I after the battle between the two in 1769. The article states that the Bhosle's should send annually to the Peshva cloth manufactured at Washim and Balapur worth Rs. 5,000. Mint was also in existence at Washim. The town was looted by the Pindaris in 1809 along with some other places in Berar region.

In the year 1905, during the period of the British Raj, Washim district was bifurcated into two separate districts, namely, Akola district and Yavatmal district, and Washim became part of Akola district and depended on Akola district for its governance.

Washim district was formed on 1 July 1998. It again became a district in 1998 by splitting Akola district, to advance the development, and governance of newly formed Washim district.

== Divisions ==
This district is divided into three sub-divisions, namely, Washim, Mangrulpir and Karanja. These are further divided into six talukas (tehsils). The talukas are Malegaon, Mangrulpir, Karanja, Manora, Washim and Risod.

Presently, there are three Vidhan Sabha (Legislative Assembly) constituencies in this district. These are Karanja, Risod and Washim. While, Risod is part of Akola Lok Sabha constituency, Karanja and Washim are part of Yavatmal-Washim Lok Sabha constituency.

== Demographics ==
Historical population
| Year | Pop. | ±% p.a. |
|---|---|---|
| 1901 | 307,413 | — |
| 1911 | 321,301 | +0.44% |
| 1921 | 324,900 | +0.11% |
| 1931 | 358,219 | +0.98% |
| 1941 | 371,046 | +0.35% |
| 1951 | 388,726 | +0.47% |
| 1961 | 473,021 | +1.98% |
| 1971 | 597,274 | +2.36% |
| 1981 | 708,685 | +1.73% |
| 1991 | 862,764 | +1.99% |
| 2001 | 1,020,822 | +1.70% |
| 2011 | 1,197,160 | +1.61% |

Religions in Washim district (2011)
| Religion | Percent |
| Hinduism | 71.83% |
| Buddhism | 14.98% |
| Islam | 11.92% |
| Jainism | 0.71% |
| Other or not stated | 0.56% |

According to the 2011 census Washim district has a population of 1,197,160, roughly equal to the nation of Timor-Leste or the US state of Rhode Island. This gives it a ranking of 398th in India (out of a total of 640). The district has a population density of 244 inhabitants per square kilometre (630/sq mi) . Its population growth rate over the decade 2001-2011 was 17.23%. Washim has a sex ratio of 926 females for every 1000 males, and a literacy rate of 81.7%. 17.66% of the population live in urban areas. Scheduled Castes and Scheduled Tribes make up 19.17% and 6.72% of the population respectively.

Languages in Washim district (2011)
1. Marathi (75.9%)
2. Lambadi (8.51%)
3. Urdu (8.26%)
4. Hindi (4.98%)
5. Others (2.37%)

At the time of the 2011 Census of India, 75.88% of the population in the district spoke Marathi, 8.51% Lambadi, 8.26% Urdu and 4.98% Hindi as their first language.

== Localities ==
- Ladegaon
- Medshi
