= Kiladar =

Qiladar (Urdu: قلعہ‌دار) was a title for the governor of a fort or large town in early modern India. During the Mughal Empire, the title was commonly pronounced 'Killedar' (Persian: کیلدار). The office of Qiladar had the same functions as that of a European feudal Castellan.

== Etymology ==
The title is composed of the Urdu word for fort "Qila", and the Persian suffix "-dar", signifying an occupation. The military historian R.H.R. Smythies originally translated the term as "Custodian of the Fort".

== History ==
The position of Qiladar was used in the Mughal Empire as well as northern India. Most large settlements or strategic forts in the Mughal Empire had a Qiladar.

However, while in northern India the autonomous position of Qiladar implied sovereignty, in southern India the position was subordinate to the civil administration of a town.

=== Ruling kiladars ===
In the case of Banganapalle, the Mughal-loyal qiladars ruled it as a princely state, which continued during the British Raj, until and after 24 January 1876, when Fath `Ali Khan was granted the higher style Nawab.

== See also ==
- Faujdar
- Kotwal
- List of forts in India

== Sources and external links ==
- WorldStatesmen - India -Princely States A-J
