= Washim =

City in Maharashtra, India

Washim Vatsagulma
- Municipality
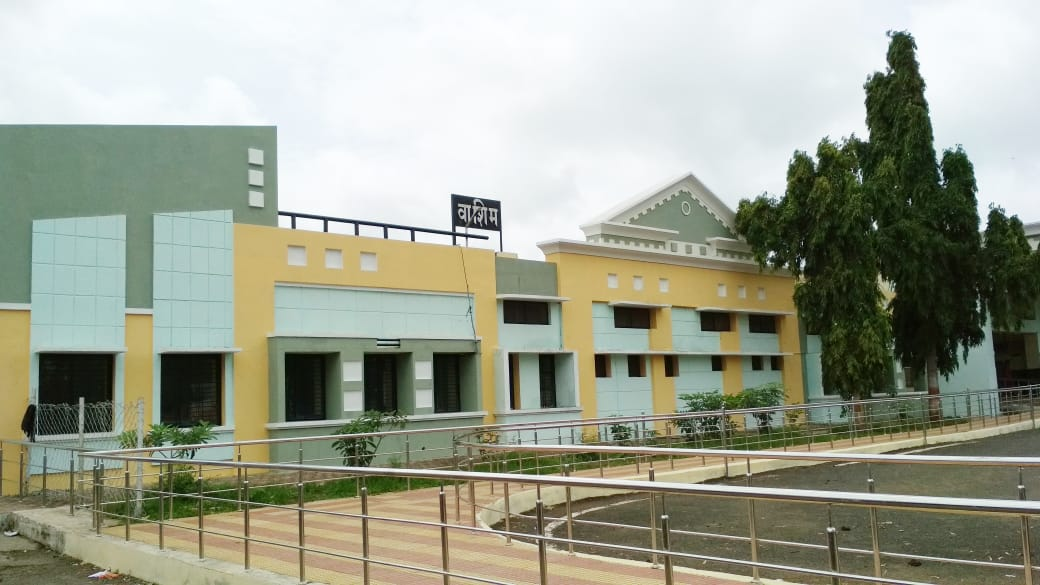
- Washim railway station
- Nickname: CHIA City
- Coordinates: 20.1°N 77.15°E
- Country: India
- State: Maharashtra
- District: Washim
- Founder: Sarvasena, the second son of Pravarsena I of Vakataka Kingdom.
- Named for: Rishi Vatsa

Government
  - Type: Municipality
  - Body: Municipal Council

Area
  - Total: 84 km^{2} (32 sq mi)
  - Rank: 34nd in Maharashtra
- Elevation: 546 m (1,791 ft)

Population (2026)
  - Total: 212,400
  - Density: 2,500/km^{2} (6,500/sq mi)
- Demonym: Washimkar

Language
  - Official: Marathi
- Time zone: UTC+5:30 (IST)
- Postal code: 444505
- Vehicle registration: MH-37
- Website: www.washim.nic.in

Washim, also known as Vatsagulma, is a city and a Municipal Council in Washim district in the Indian state of Maharashtra. Washim is the district headquarters of Washim district.

== History ==
Washim was known earlier as Vatsagulma and it was the capital of the Vatsagulma line of Vakataka dynasty. During British times Washim was bifurcated in into two separated districts namely Akola and Yavatmal.

Washim district was formed on 1 July 1998. It again became a district in 1998 by splitting Akola district, to advance the development, and governance of newly formed Washim district.

== Climate ==
Climate data for Washim (1991-2020)
Month	Jan	Feb	Mar	Apr	May	Jun	Jul	Aug	Sep	Oct	Nov	Dec	Year
Record high °C (°F)	36.2 (97.2)	37.6 (99.7)	41.2 (106.2)	45.0 (113.0)	45.4 (113.7)	44.8 (112.6)	38.2 (100.8)	33.2 (91.8)	35.7 (96.3)	36.4 (97.5)	35.0 (95.0)	33.8 (92.8)	45.4 (113.7)
Mean daily maximum °C (°F)	30.2 (86.4)	32.6 (90.7)	36.9 (98.4)	39.9 (103.8)	42.1 (107.8)	36.3 (97.3)	30.1 (86.2)	29.1 (84.4)	30.8 (87.4)	32.7 (90.9)	31.7 (89.1)	30.3 (86.5)	33.4 (92.1)
Mean daily minimum °C (°F)	14.0 (57.2)	17.0 (62.6)	20.6 (69.1)	24.3 (75.7)	27.5 (81.5)	24.0 (75.2)	22.4 (72.3)	21.8 (71.2)	21.9 (71.4)	19.9 (67.8)	17.2 (63.0)	14.4 (57.9)	20.3 (68.5)
Record low °C (°F)	8.6 (47.5)	8.0 (46.4)	11.0 (51.8)	17.5 (63.5)	21.0 (69.8)	19.8 (67.6)	18.6 (65.5)	17.1 (62.8)	17.6 (63.7)	12.8 (55.0)	11.0 (51.8)	8.8 (47.8)	8.0 (46.4)
Source: India Meteorological Department

== Demographics ==
As of 2025 India census, Washim had a population of 1,10000. Males constitute 52% of the population and females 48%. Washim has an average literacy rate of 83.25%, higher than the State average of 82.34%: male literacy is 90.55%, and female literacy is 75.48%. In Washim, 15% of the population is under 6 years of age.

Year	Male	Female	Total Population	Change	Religion (%)							
Year	Male	Female	Total Population	Change	Hindu	Muslim	Christian	Sikhs	Jain	Other religions and persuasions	Religion not stated	
2001	32637	30319	62956	-	64.458	21.903	1.064	0.405	9.862	2.263	0.013	0.032
2011	40262	38125	78387	0.245	63.926	21.245	0.808	0.260	11.702	1.970	0.031	0.059

View source data.

== Civic administration ==
The municipal council was established at Washim in 1869 and is now governed under the Maharashtra Municipalities Act, 1965. It covers, according to the Census of 1961, an area of 42.16 square km. The municipal council is composed of 18 members with two seats each being reserved for the scheduled castes and women.

With a view to providing various facilities to the town's people, the municipality conducts primary schools and a high school and maintains a dispensary. The underground drainage system is present in the town. Also, there are stone-lined gutters and sewage. The meeting hall of the municipality is used by the town's people as a town hall. Protected piped water is supplied to the town, but wells and Ek Burji Dam form the main source of water supply.

== Places of interest ==
The antiquity of the town has given rise to a number of objects and places of interest in the town. The chief among them is Padmatirtha, Balaji temple, Rama temple, Madhyameshvara temple, Godeshvara temple, two Jain temples and Narayana Maharaja Temple. The Vatsagulmamahatmya mentions that the town contains 108 holy tanks and tirthas. A few of them can still be identified in the town.

- Kondeshwar Mandir, Kondala Zamare is one of the most famous Shiva Temple, located at Kondala Zamare (7 km (4.3 mi) from Washim). Kondeshwar mandir has a rich history and is surrounded by beautiful hills. Mythology detects- Ram, Sita, and Laxman has visited the temple during 'Vanwas', there is a place where there are 'Ram-Sita Paduka' resides. Besides religious importance, Kondeshwar temple is famous for a Kund (A pond about 60 feet deep) that attracts visitors as they can enjoy joyful swimming. Kondeshwar is quite crowded during 'Shravan month' and 'Mahashivratri' as devotees across the state visit the temple.
- Padmatirth Washim is known to have had 108 tirthas, holy places or sacred springs, associated with different gods and rishis. The Padmatirtha is one of the chief tirthas created by Vishnu. The reference to this tirtha has already occurred in the story connected with the origin of the name of the town, it is situated in the northern quarters of the town. The sides are built up in cut stones. Now the tirtha comprises two kundas, a reservoir for rainwater harvesting, one to the north and the other to the south. Recently one Shri Rama-Narayan Toshnival has constructed a small but artistic temple dedicated to Mahadeva in the centre of the kund used formerly by those who entered the tirtha for swimming as their resting place it is a cement concrete construction. An east-west bridge has been put across the tirtha to facilitate the entrance to the temple in the middle of the reservoir. It is said that the colour of the shalunka, base of lingam also called parashakti, placed in the temple changes thrice in a day i. e., once in the morning, then in the afternoon and last in the evening. According to the British Raj] era Land and Revenue Settlement report of 1871, the tank used to supply all the drinking water required by the town but it has since lost its purity and taste. The people use the tirtha for the immersion of bones and ashes of the dead whose last rites are performed on its bank. the tirtha is also used for swimming purposes.
- Balaji Mandir The temple of Balaji is a considerably old temple in the town and was constructed by Bhavani Kaloo who rose to be the divan of Sabaji Bhosle and Janoji Bhosle (king of Nagpur kingdom). He constructed the temple in 1779 AD when he was the Subhedar at the thana of Karanja. The shrine is much revered. The images in the temple of Vyankateshvar Balaji are said to have been buried during Aurangzeb's reign to save them from destruction. All trace of them was lost, but in about 1760 a horseman happened casually to turn up a little earth with his stick and perceived a finger of an image. Images of Brahma, Vishnu, Mahadeva, Parvati, Devi, Ganapati, and Naga were taken out. At that time Bhavani Kaloo, who had been patwari of the village Khadi Dhanini in Mangrul tahsil but had become the Divan (or according to some accounts, a general) of the Bhosale Rajas, was at Bashini. He set up the present temple, a fine building standing in a large paved quadrangle, with a well-built veranda for pilgrims to stay, a bhandara for Brahmans to take food and various offices. The work took 12 years but was finished, according to an inscription on a pillar in front, in 1700 Shaka (1776 CE). The Dev Talav or Balaji Talav, a large square tank with stone-built sides, strongly and handsomely finished, and with a Jalakridasthana platform, resting-place for swimmers in the middle of the water body was made at the same time. The chief image is of black stone and sparkles with ornaments; a fine view of the town is to be obtained from the top of the temple gateway, though the staircase is rather abrupt. A dome plated with gold has recently been constructed over the inner chamber of the temple. According to the old Gazetteer 'large jagirs and inaams were given for the support of the temple, the present revenue being Rs. 11,000 from those sources and Rs. 3,000 from kangi offerings. A big fair is held in honor of Balaji, in Ashvina month (September–October). About 12,000 to 15,000 people assemble at the time of the fair.
- Balaji Talav The Deo talav also known as Balaji talav, a large square tank with stone-built sides, strongly and handsomely finished and with a jalakridasthana, resting place for swimmers in the middle, was laid out at the time of the construction of Balaji mandir in 1770 CE. The temple is flanked on one side by the temple of Vyankateshvar Balaji and on the other by that of Ramchandra. The tree plantations by the tile side of the tank have now thoroughly disappeared. During the Ganapati festival, the immersion of the idols takes place in this tank and as a result, this tank is getting silted gradually. However, the tank still stands in good condition.
- Rama Mandir On the other side of the Deo talav is a temple dedicated to Ramchandra, a large enclosed building but not, by any means as fine as the temple of Balaji. it contains images of Lakshmana, Sita, Maruti and Radha-Krishna besides that of Ramchandra. It is said to have been built by one Bhagvandas Maharaj Bairagi about 250 years ago. In front of the temple, has recently been constructed a two-storeyed dharmashala. It is used by the bairagis who visit the temple. Marriage and such other religious functions also take place in this Dharamshala. Ramanavami is celebrated at this temple with great pomp.
- Daridrya Harana Tirtha The Daridrya-Harana Tirtha is said to have been created by Shri Dattatreya. Well built as the tank seems to have been formerly, the steps on only one side are noticeable now. By the side of the tank is a large banyan tree. One anecdote about the tirtha says that king Dashratha of Ayodhya, the father of Rama, killed Shravan by mistake by sitting over this tree.
- Madhyameshvar Mandir was constructed about 5 to 7 years ago. After entering a big audience hall there is an inner chamber where is placed a shalunka of Shiva. At the time of the construction of the temple, some images and inscriptions were excavated at the site. The temple is said to have been constructed at a place where according to the belief of astronomers passes the equator and hence the temple is known as the Madhyameshvara temple.
- Narayana Maharaja Temple has recently been constructed over the samadhi of Narayan Maharaj who stayed at Washim. The image of Narayan Maharaj has been placed over the samadhi. One has to go a few steps below the ground level to reach this shrine. From there another staircase leads to the altar where is placed the image of Shri Dattatreya. The whole construction is of white marble. The temple owns some adjacent land. The audience hall is under construction. Every year a small fair attended by the local populace is held on Datta Jayanti.
- Gondeshvara Temple To the west of the town is the temple of Gondeshvara, much in a dilapidated condition. In the temple, are three images viz., those of Vishnu, his sister, and Lakshmi. By the side of the temple is ample garden land making the whole panorama of the temple extremely beautiful.
- Shringi Rishi To the southeast direction, on the way to Pusad, there is a small town called Ansing which is the corrupt name of Ekshring Shringi Rishi. He was the one who performed Putrakameshti yagnya or the holy pyre for Dasharatha and his wives Kaushalya, Kaikeyi and Sumitra. Then they begot Ram, Lakshman, Bharat and Shatrughna. His temple is located in the far east of town.

== Transport ==
=== Road ===
Washim is connected by State Highways to all the important cities of Maharashtra. Important Roads include Washim-Mangrul Pir-Karanja-Ner-Yavatmal, Washim-Karanja-Amravati-Nagpur, Washim-Malegaon-Akola, Washim-Risod-Lonar-Sindhkhed Raja-Jalna-Aurangabad-Ahmednagar-Pune-Mumbai, Washim-Kanergaon Naka-Hingoli-Nanded and Washim-Ansing-Pusad. In future Maharashtra's Nagpur or Chandrapur to Pune expressway if propose can be pass via Yavatmal, washim, Lonar, Paithan, Ahmednagar. Mumbai-Nagpur Samriddhhi Mahamarg

=== Bus Station, Washim ===
Washim Bus Station is the main public bus station. It is the main facility of Maharashtra State Road Transport Corporation (MSRTC), which connects Washim to other parts of Vidarbha, Marathwada and other parts of Maharashtra.

Major bus routes from Washim Bus Station:

- Vidarbha region (nearby and main road)
  - Washim → Akola (Bus service approximately every 15–30 minutes)
  - Washim → Risod (Bus service approximately every 15-30 minutes)
  - Washim → Shegaon
  - Washim → Amravati
  - Washim → Yavatmal
  - Washim → Pusad
  - Washim → Parbhani
  - Washim → Nanded
  - Washim → Chandrapur
- Marathwada region
  - Washim → Aurangabad (Chhatrapati Sambhajinagar)
  - Washim → Latur
  - Washim → Osmanabad
  - Washim → Beed
- West Maharashtra and North Maharashtra
  - Washim → Pune
  - Washim → Nashik
  - Washim → Dhule
  - Washim → Jalgaon
  - Washim → Shirdi
  - Washim → Pandharpur
- Other state routes
  - Washim → Nagpur (capital of Vidarbha)
  - Washim → Hyderabad (Telangana)
  - Washim → Indore (Madhya Pradesh, some private buses)

=== Rail ===
Washim is a railway station on Purna-Khandwa section of South Central Railway (SCR). It was in the Hyderabad division of SCR and now is in the Nanded division after bifurcation of the Hyderabad division. Washim was connected to the Broad Gauge Railway Network in 2008 when tracks were extended from Purna to Akola.

17639/17640 Kacheguda–Akola Intercity Express can be accessed by the passengers arriving from Nagpur or Mumbai route while Hyderabad and Nanded can be accessed from the south. Weekly, Bi-weekly, Special, Daily, Intercity trains connecting to major stations like Delhi, Mumbai, Pune, Tirupati, Agra, Mathura, Amritsar, Chandigarh, Ambala, Ludhiana, Shri Ganganagar, Jaipur, Ajmer, Kota, Hyderabad, Nangaldam (Himachal Pradesh) Aurangabad, Nagpur, Indore, Yeshwantpur (Bangalore), Nashik, Nanded, Amravati, Bhopal, Khandwa, etc. from Washim. Washim has 3 platforms.
