= Gawilghur =

Historic fortress in Vidarbha, India

Gawilghur fort
- Amravati District, VidarbhaMaharashtra
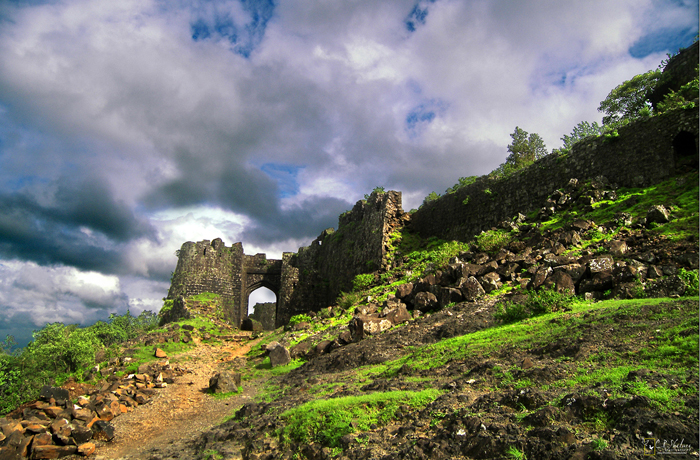
- Gavilgad fort walls

Site information
- Type: Hill fort
- Owner: Government of India
- Controlled by: Gujarat Sultanate, Bahmani Sultanate, Berar Sultanate, Mughal Empire, Rajputs of Maratha confederacy, British Empire
- Open to the public: Yes

Location
- Shown within Maharashtra
- Location within India Location within Maharashtra
- Coordinates: 21°22′56″N 77°20′2″E
- Height: 1,103 m (3,619 ft) ASL

Site history
- Built: 1425-26 AD
- Built by: Gond kings
- In use: 1425-1803 AD
- Materials: Stone
- Battles/wars: Capture of Gawilghur

Garrison information
- Past commanders: Rana Shivdeosingh Rajput

Gawilghur (also, Gawilgarh or Gawilgad, Pronunciation: [ɡaːʋilɡəɖ]) was a well-fortified mountain stronghold of the Maratha Empire north of the Deccan Plateau, in the vicinity of Satpura Ranges, Amravati District, Maharashtra. It was successfully assaulted by a force commanded by Arthur Wellesley on 15 December 1803 during the Second Anglo-Maratha War.

== History ==
The fort takes its name from the Gawli (cow herds) who inhabited the Berar (modern day Amravati) for centuries. Earlier the fort was likely just made of mud as were several such areas in the region. The exact date of construction is not known but the Persian historian, Firishta, records that Ahmed Shah Wali, the ninth king of the Bahamani dynasty reconstructed Gawilgarh when he was encamped at Ellichpur in 1425. Likely this was the date when major fortification was carried out.

In 1803 during the 2nd Maratha War the fort was besieged by Arthur Wellesley (later Duke of Wellington). After two failed attempts at the main gate by British and Sepoy companies, and many casualties, Captain Campbell led the 94th Highlanders (light company) up the ravine dividing the inner and outer forts and into the inner fort by escalade. The Scots then forced the northern gatehouse and opened the many gates, allowing the remaining British forces entry. The British suffered few casualties in the final assault (approx. 150). The fortress was returned to the Killedar Rana Shivsingh Rajput of the Maratha Empire, after making peace with the British but they abandoned it.

== Major features ==
The fort has several inscriptions in Persian recording the date of building of each of its seven gates. It has two water tanks (Devtalav and Khantalav), which would have been the main water source in case the fort was besieged. . So, probably there is a tunnel connecting the two forts.

There are several unrepaired breaches made by British guns, which remain to this day. The gun that killed five attackers with a single shot still stands, although now with graffiti running the length of the barrel.

== See also ==
- List of forts in Maharashtra
