= Karanja Lad =

Karanja Karanja lad
- City
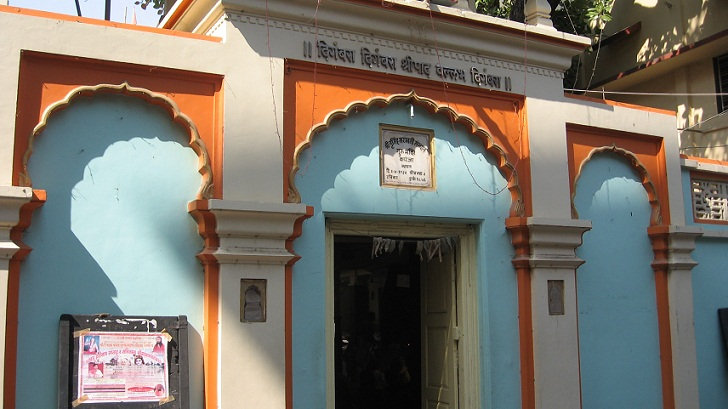
- Small Railway Station in Karanja on Achalpur-Murtijapur-Yavatmal narrow gauge railway line.

- Location in Maharashtra, India
- Coordinates: 20.4833°N 77.4833°E
- Country: India
- State: Maharashtra
- District Region Division: Washim Vidarbha Amravati
- Named for: Saint Karanj

Government
  - Type: Municipal Council
  - Body: Karanja(Lad) Municipal Council

Area
  - Total: 13.55 km^{2} (5.23 sq mi)
  - Rank: 1st
- Elevation: 400 m (1,300 ft)

Population (2011)
  - Total: 100,947
  - Density: 7,450/km^{2} (19,300/sq mi)
- Demonym: karanjakar

Language
  - Official: Marathi
- Time zone: UTC+5:30 (IST)
- PIN: 444105
- Telephone code: 91-7256
- Vehicle registration: MH37 (Washim District)

Karanja Lad, or Karanja, is a city of a Municipal council in Washim district in the Indian state of Maharashtra. The town is named after Saint Karanj. Karanja is a holy place for Hindus, Jains, and Muslims. It is the birthplace of Shri Narasimha Saraswati Swami Maharaj, believed to be the second incarnation of Lord Dattatreya.

== Demographics ==
As of the 2011 Indian census, Karanja had a population of 100,947. Males made up 52% of the population and females 48%. Karanja has an average literacy rate of 72%, higher than the national average of 59.5%. Male literacy rate is 78%, and female literacy is 67%.

Islam is the dominant religion with 49.80% being Muslims, while Hinduism forms 39.46% of the population.

== Karanja City ==
Karanja City is known for being an important religious center as well as its historical significance. The city is home to a number of ancient temples and ancient Mosques, including the Jain Temples (Shri Mulsangh Chandranatha swami), Guru Mandir (Shri Nrusimha Saraswati Gurumaharaj) Jama Masjid, Nagina Masjid, Bibi Saheb dargah and Nawab Subhan Khan Masjid, which are dedicated to the Nawab Subhan Khan, the ruler of the Mughal Empire.Lad Name is kept based on the Majority of the community was from Jains in past.

In addition to its religious significance, Karanja is also known for its scenic beauty, with lush green hills, fertile fields, and winding rivers. The city is located in the midst of fertile agricultural land, and is surrounded by lush green forests.

Religions in Karanja
Religion	Percent
Muslims	49.80%
Hindus	39.46%
Buddhists	6.34%
Jains	4.00%
Christians	0.09%
Others†	0.30%
Distribution of religions †Includes Sikhs (0.13%), Buddhists (<0.20%).

== Geography ==
Karanja is located at 20°48′33″N 77°48′33″E. It has an average elevation of 422 metres (1387 feet). The Adan River flows near Karanja city. It is an important source of domestic water supply to the city. There are three lakes situated in the city, the Rishi Talaw, the Sarang Talaw, and the Chandra Talaw.

== Places of interest ==
=== Temples ===
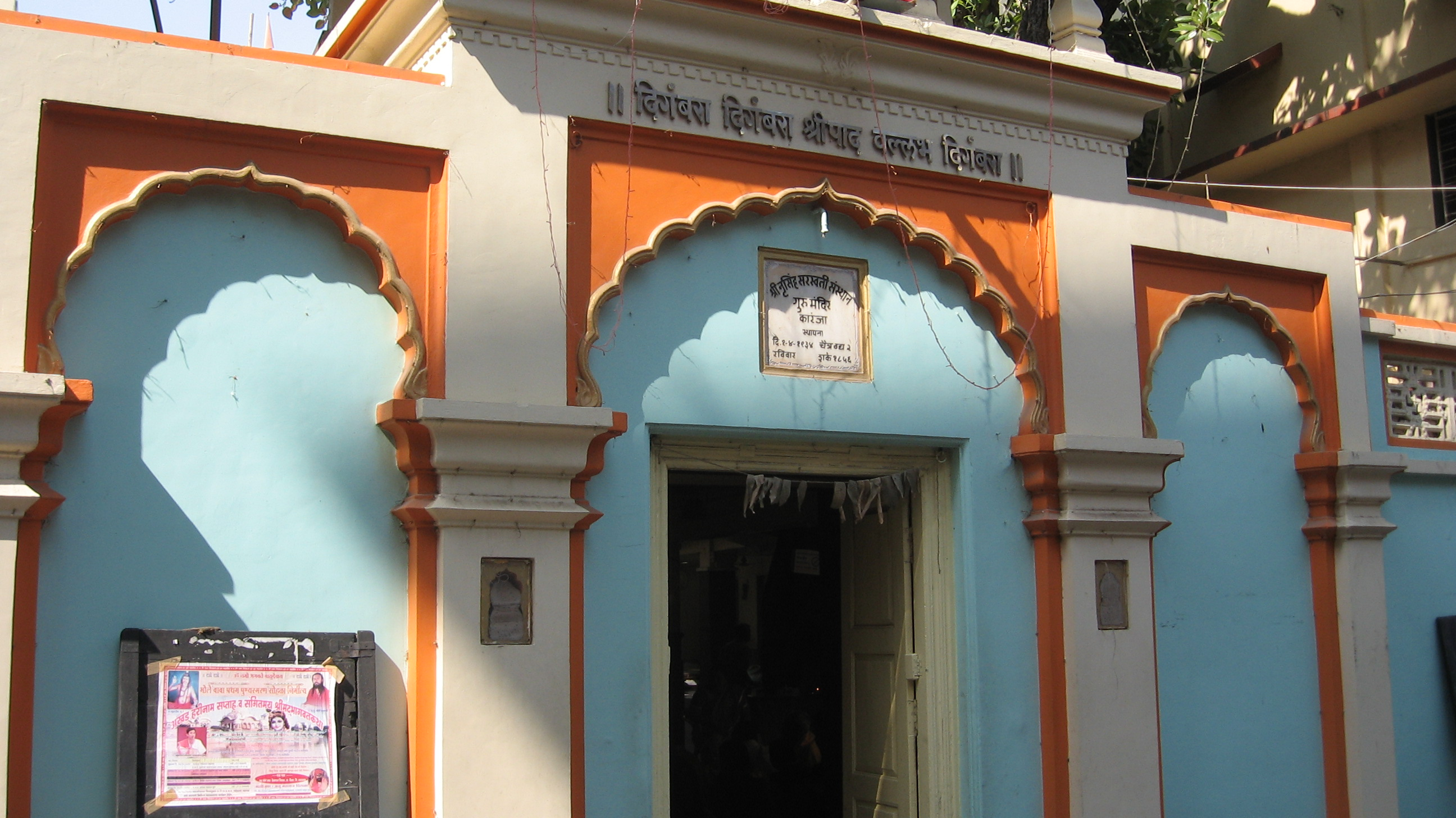
Shri Guru Mandir Entrance

Karanja is famous for its Nrusimha Saraswati Swami Maharaj temple. Shri Nrusimha Saraswati Gurumaharaj is the second avatar (incarnation) of Lord Dattatreya. Born in Karanja in 1378, he traveled far and wide in what is now known as the States of Maharashtra, Karnataka, Telangana and Andhra Pradesh. He achieved Sainthood and performed several miracles. He imparted spiritual knowledge to his disciples, many of whom themselves attained Sainthood. The Gurumandir Temple conducts several major events to celebrate the various avatars of Lord Dattatreya. Over the past 100 years, Gurumandir has become a nucleus for religious and social welfare activities in Maharashtra's Vidarbha region.

Other old temples are Vitthal mandir, Chote Ram mandir and as well as famous "Kannao Ram mandir". Each year Ramnavami and other Hindu religious activities are performed in these temples.

=== Jain temples and institutions ===
Karanja is the only place in India that had been the set of three Bhatarakas representing three Digambar Jain traditions: Balatkar Gana, Sena Gana and Kastha Sangh. The Balatkar Gana seat had relocated from Manyakheta.

There are four major Digambar Jain temples in Karanja. The Kastha Sangh temple has extraordinary wooden carvings dating back to at least 14th century. The Sena Gana temple has a pat (scroll) painting depicting the Panchkalyanak ceremonies of Jain Tirthankars. This scroll is painted in the Rajasthani style and is around 800 years old. Balatkar Gana temple has a collection of rare manuscripts. In 1926, Prof. Hiralal Jain had discovered 12 unknown Apabhramsha manuscripts here. They were later edited and published, supported by local donors.

Karanja is known as the "Kashi" of Jainism. Also famous is the "Mahaveer Brahmacharyashram" or Gurukul. This place is the site of the first Gurukul founded by Acharya Shri 108 Samantabhadra in 1918 AD, it celebrated its ‘Shatakpurti Mahotsav’ in 2018. The Karanja institution was the first of 11 Gurukuls established by Acharya Samantabhadra. Gurukuls based this pattern was later started in Maharashtra (Bahubali, Ellora, Kunthalgiri), Khurai in Madhya Pradesh, and Karnataka (Stawawidhi, Karkal, Terdal, Bellad Bagewadi). The famous Berkeley scholar of Buddhism and Jainism Padmanabh Jaini was a student of the Karanja Gurukul.

=== Mosques ===
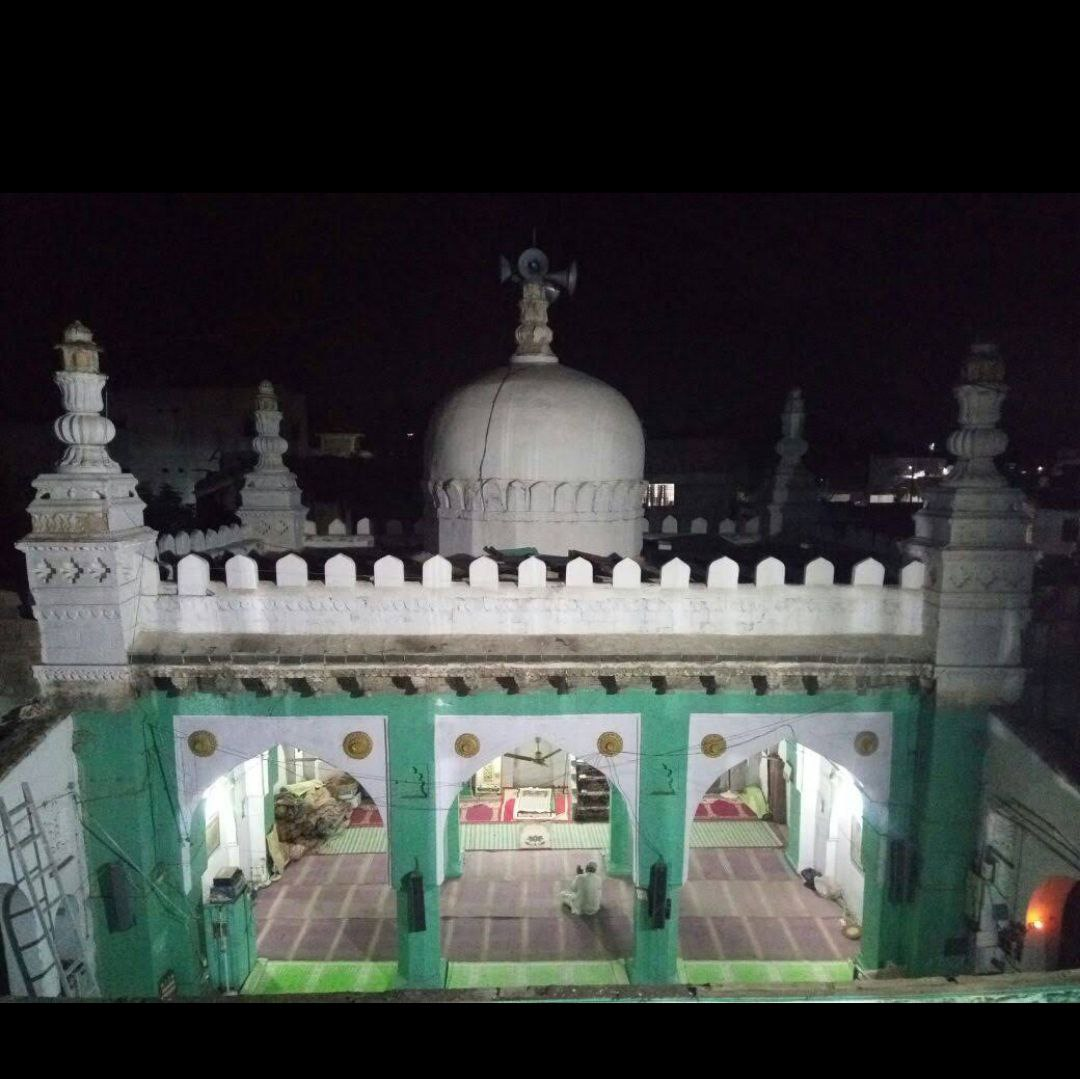
white gumbad jama masjid karanja lad made by mughals.

Karanja is also known as Karanja Bibi, referring to BiBi Saheba's Dargah in the Bibi Sahebapura. Karanja is also famous for its mosques (masjids). There are as many as 60 mosques in Karanja, most notably the Jama Masjid, which is a historical mosque built in 981 Hijri (1573/74 AD).

=== Kannao Mansion ===
Built in 1905, Kannao Mansion is famous for its use of French/Italian architecture. Kannao Mansion is more than a century-old replica of Shrilanka Queen Bungalow. It was also featured in the Marathi channel.

=== Historical places ===
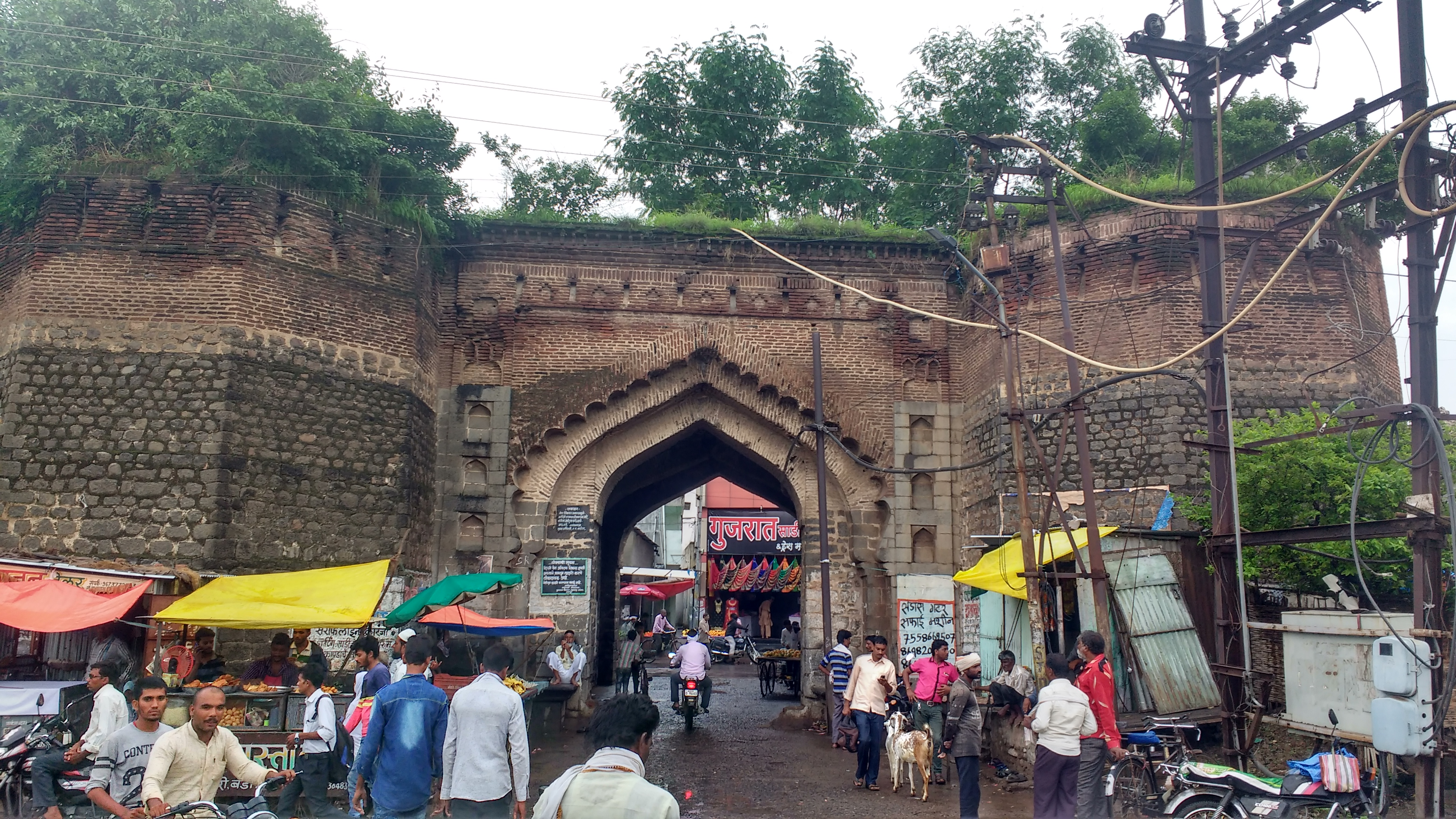
Delhi Gate Karanja Lad

The Kannao Bungalow has 307 doors. Nawab Subhan Khan constructed a wall and four doors around Karanja, namely the Delhi Gate, the Darwha Gate, the Mangrul Gate, and the Poha Gate.

=== Karanja APMC ===
Karanja Agriculture Produce Market Committee (APMC) is first ever APMC in India built in year 1900 by Britishers to mainly purchase cotton from Vidarbha region farmers in low cost and send it to Manchester (UK) so the raw material is available to mills at low cost. Market has surplus income. The total arrival of agriculture produces every is nearly ₹700 crores.

== Politics ==
Hindu, Muslim, and Jain communities are actively involved in the municipal politics of Karanja. All communities coexist peacefully and with respect for each other's religious sentiments. Prakash Dahake and Yusuf Punjani are considered the most powerful politicians from Karanja. Mr. Dahake was a Member of the Legislative Assembly (MLA) from Karanja. After the 2014 state elections, Rajendra Patni was elected as the Member of the Legislative Assembly (MLA) from Karanja defeating Yusuf Punjani by a very narrow margin.

== Fruit cultivation and market ==
Karanja is famous for its fruit market. Karanja has a profitable market of papayas, and distributes the fruits across India, Nepal, and Bhutan.
