= Risod =

Rushivat
- City
- Risod
- Location in Maharashtra, India
- Coordinates: 19.97°N 76.78°E
- Country: India
- State: Maharashtra
- District: Washim
- Named for: Rushimunies

Government
  - Body: Municipal council (India)

Area
  - Total: 8.25 km^{2} (3.19 sq mi)
  - Rank: 3rd in Washim District
- Elevation: 542 m (1,778 ft)

Population (2011)
  - Total: 34,136
  - Rank: 3rd in Washim District
  - Density: 2,369/km^{2} (6,140/sq mi)
- Demonym: Risodkar

Languages
  - Official: Marathi
- Time zone: UTC+5:30 (IST)
- PIN: 444506
- Vehicle registration: MH-37

Risod is a city and a municipal council in Washim district in the Indian state of Maharashtra.

== Population ==
Year	Male	Female	Total Population	Change	Religion (%)							
Year	Male	Female	Total Population	Change	Hindu	Muslim	Christian	Sikhs	Buddhist	Jain	Other religions and persuasions	Religion not stated
2001	14274	13242	27516	-	63.229	25.320	0.033	0.007	8.642	2.704	0.040	0.025
2011	17647	16489	34136	0.241	60.921	26.632	0.138	0.067	9.735	2.276	0.003	0.228
