= Ahmednagar invasion of Bidar =

16th century conflict in Deccan

Ahmednagar Invasion of Bidar
- Part of Deccani–Vijayanagar wars
Date	1547–1548
Location	Karnataka, Maharashtra, India
Result	Ahmednagar Sultanate victory
Territorial changes	Udgir, Medak and Kandhar captured from Bidar Sultanate

Belligerents
Deccan Sultanates: Ahmednagar Sultanate; Golconda Sultanate; Berar Sultanate; Supported by : Vijayanagar Empire	Deccan Sultanates: Bijapur Sultanate; Bidar Sultanate

Commanders and leaders
Burhan Nizam Shah I Gharib Khan; Jamsheed Quli Qutub Shah; Darya Imad Shah; Rama Raya; Venkatadri	Ibrahim Adil Shah I Asad Khan; Yaklas Khan; Ali Barid Shah I

The Ahmednagar invasion of Bidar led by Burhan Nizam Shah I was a campaign aimed at expanding his influence in the Deccan. Burhan formed a powerful alliance with the Sultanates of Berar, Golconda, and the Vijayanagar Empire to challenge the combined forces of Bidar and Bijapur. The coalition launched coordinated attacks, and Ahmednagar forces achieved several victories capturing the strategic forts of Ausa, Udgir, and Kandhar.

== Background ==
Following his defeat in the war of 1544 AD, Jamsheed Quli Qutb Shah of Golkonda harbored resentment and sought to retaliate against Ali Barid Shah I of Bidar. After gathering resources and reinforcing his army, Jamsheed marched on Bidar prompting ali to mobilize his forces in response. The two armies clashed at Narayankerra in a fiercely contested battle, but neither side emerged victorious. As Jamsheed redirected his campaign towards Kaulas Fort Ali Barid seized the opportunity to launch a surprise attack on the Qutub Shahi camp at Narayankerra, routing Jamsheed's forces and forcing him to retreat.

After his defeat at Narayankerra, Jamsheed Quli Qutb Shah swiftly regrouped and seized control of Kaulas Fort, Narayankerra, and Ahswabad. Seeking to strengthen his position, he invited Burhan Nizam Shah I of Ahmadnagar to join him. Burhan, eager to avenge Ali Barid's refusal to aid him during the Battle of Hoorchean in 1546 AD, accepted the invitation. Seizing the opportunity for personal gain, Burhan marched against Bidar and initiated hostilities by laying siege to Ausa.

== Campaign ==
Fearing Burhan Nizam Shah I’s campaign, Ali Barid Shah I of Bidar sought aid from Ibrahim Adil Shah I of Bijapur, offering to cede Kalyani in return for military support. In response, Ibrahim dispatched Yekhlas Khan with 5,000 cavalry to reinforce Bidar's defenses. The combined forces of Bijapur and Bidar united at Kalyani and engaged the Ahmadnagar forces near Ausa and the Golkonda troops at Narayankerra. In both battles, the allied defenders we're defeated.

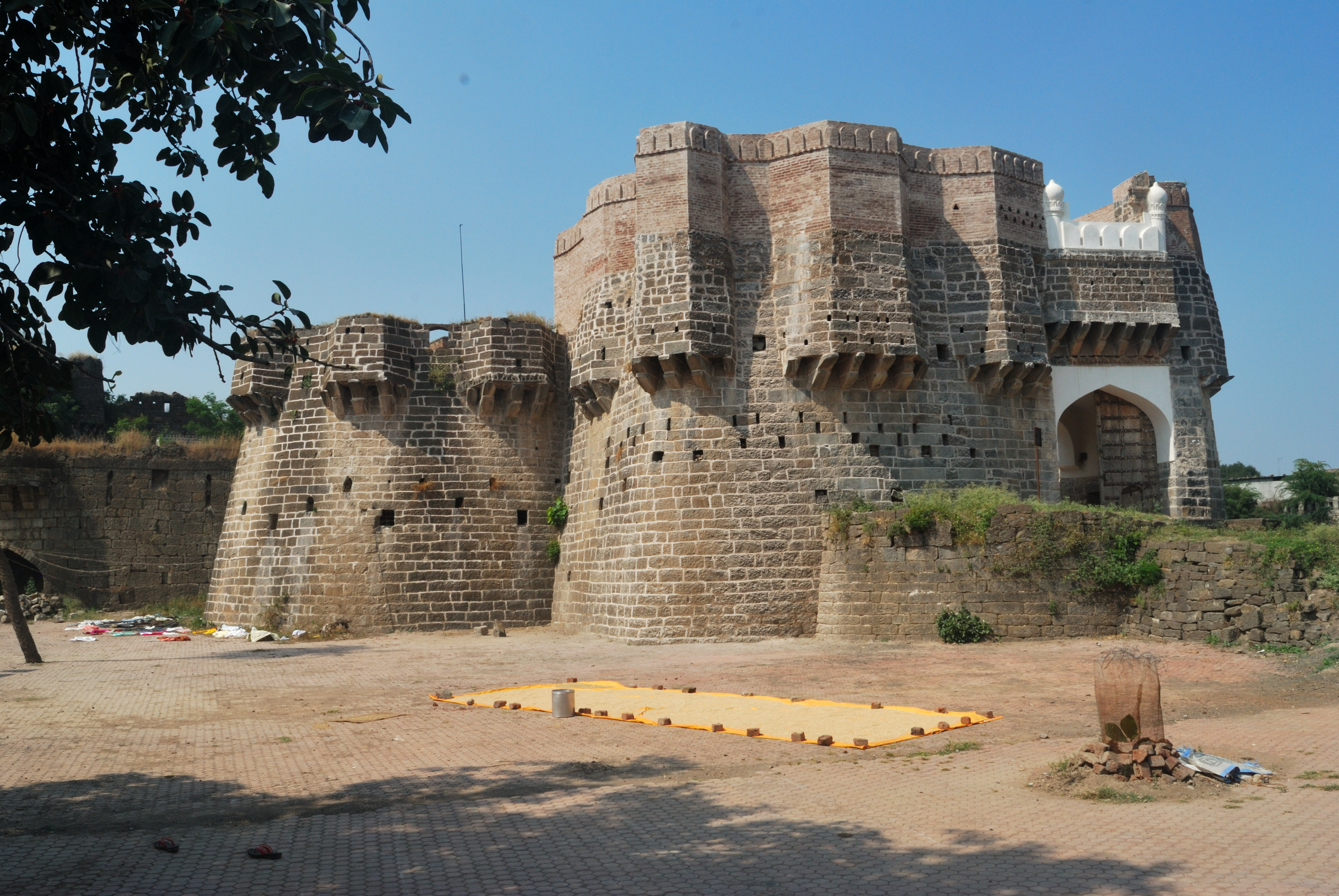
AusaFort

After his victory at Ausa Burhan Nizam Shah I advanced towards Udgir capturing the fort. Encouraged by this success, he pressed on to Kandhar a strategic stronghold. The defenders mounted a determined effort to resist the siege, but Burhan's forces defeated them in battle. With no further opposition, the fort of Kandhar fell into Burhan Nizam Shah I’s hands.

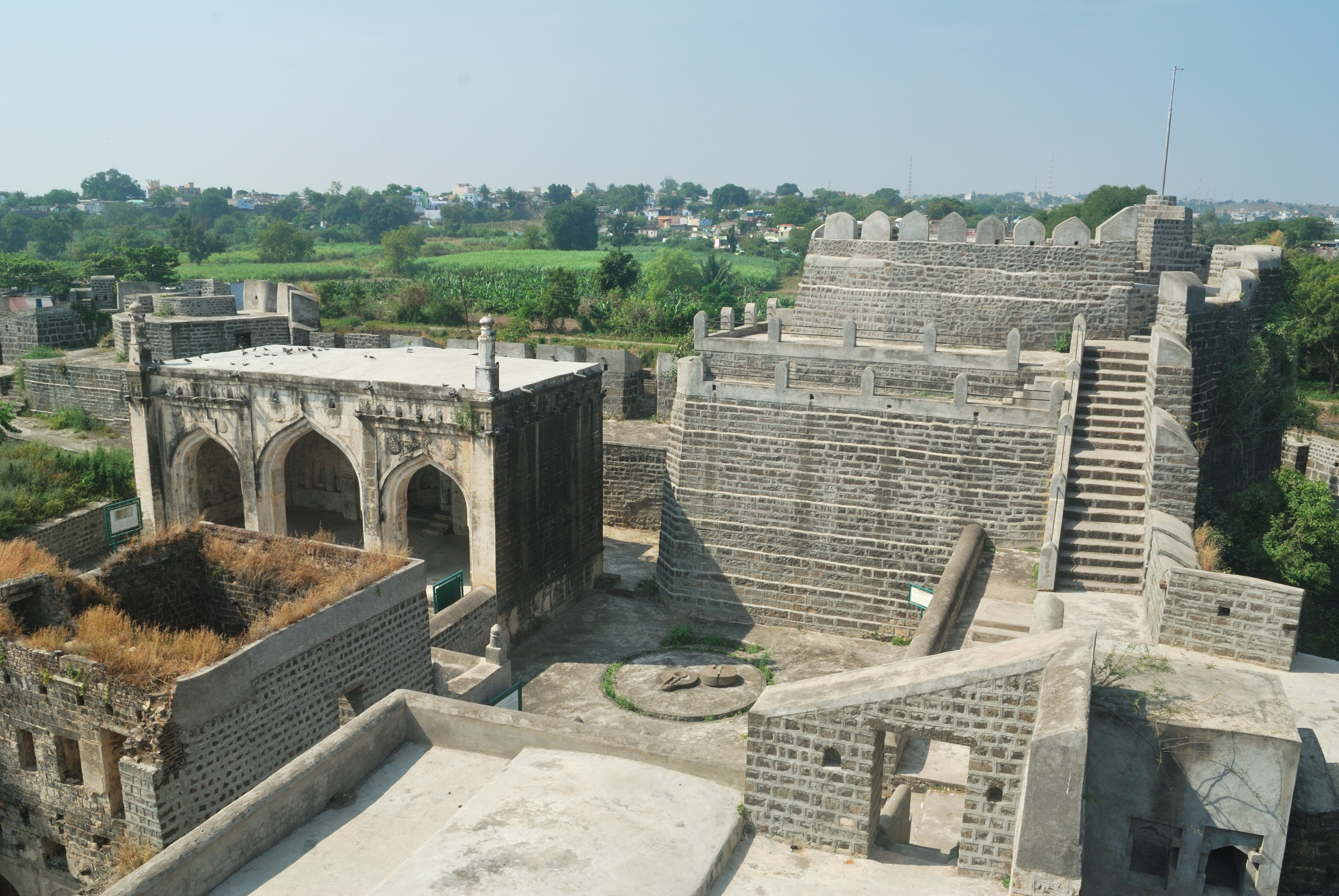
Kandhar Fort

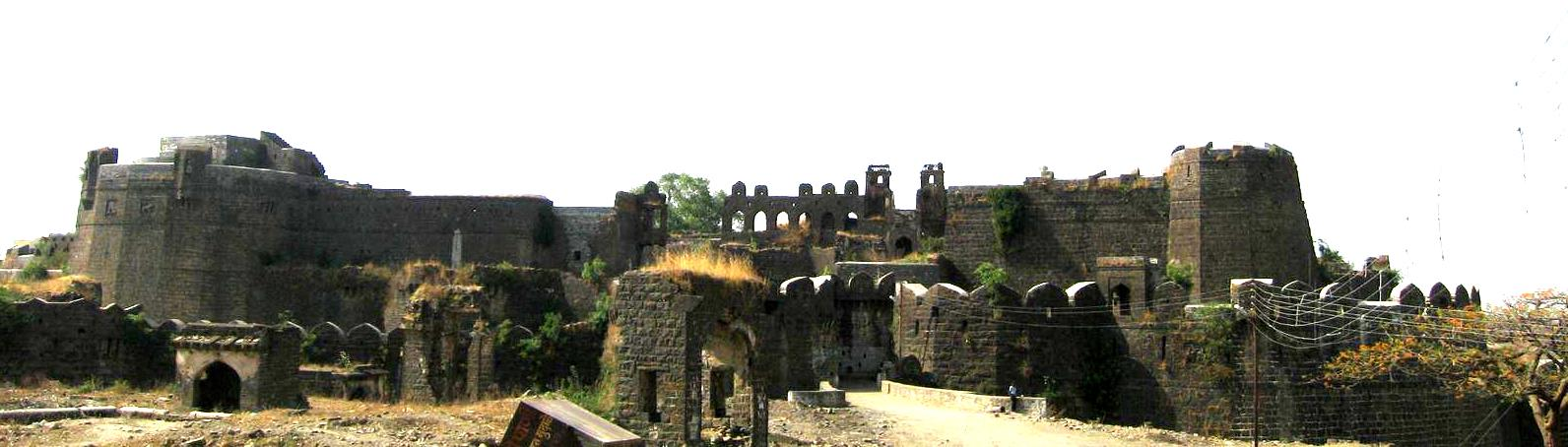
Udgir Fort

While Burhan Nizam Shah was capturing Kandahar Rama Raya of Vijayanagara also contributed forces to support the alliance against Bidar. Around this time, Jamsheed Quli Qutb Shah advanced from Kaulas Fort and joined Burhan and their combined forces at Ausa. Strengthened by this union, Jamsheed led his troops towards Medak capturing the fortress from Ali Barid's forces, further weakening the Bidar Sultanate’s hold on the region.

Venkatadri, leading the Vijayanagar army engaged Ali Barid's army in a battle during the campaign. In the battle, Venkatadri emerged victorious As a mark of his victory he seized Ali Barid Shah I’s royal insignia and military band.

== See also ==
- Ali Barid Shah I
- Burhan Nizam Shah I
- Darya Imad Shah
