= Deccan sultanates =

Name for five former polities in India

The Deccan sultanates (Note: Telugu: దక్కన్ సుల్తానేట్‌లు, romanised: Dakkān Saltānatlu, Persian: سلطان نشین های دکن, romanised: Saltān Neshin Cpehēi Dekān) is a historiographical term referring to five medieval Persianate Muslim kingdoms based in the Deccan Plateau between the Krishna River and the Vindhya Range. They emerged after the disintegration of the Bahmani Sultanate and were ruled by various dynasties: Ahmadnagar, Berar, Bidar, Bijapur, and Golconda. Ahmadnagar was the first to declare independence, in 1490; followed by Bijapur and Berar in the same year. Bidar became independent in c. 1492, and Golconda in 1512 CE.

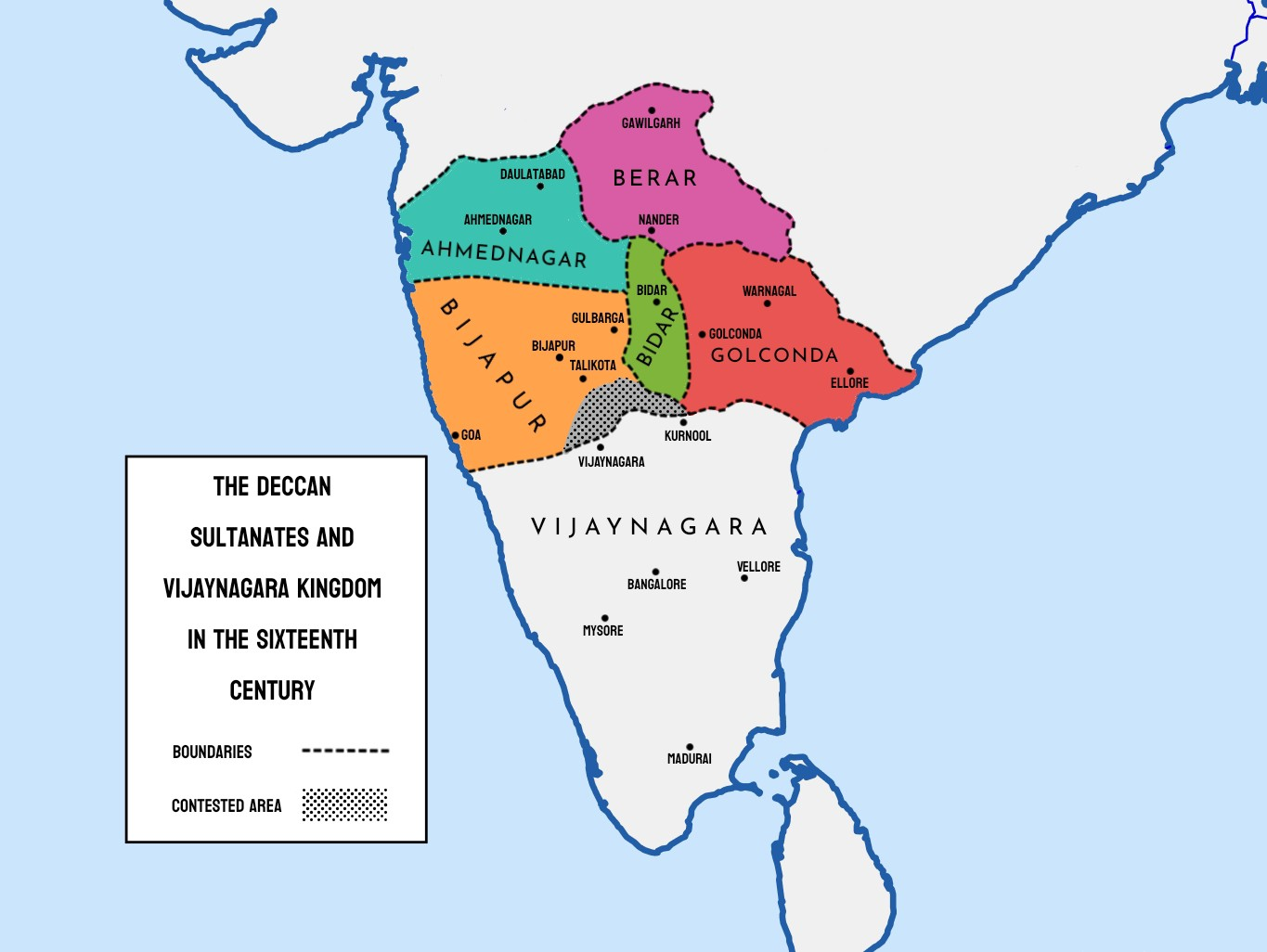
Map of the Deccan sultanates in 16th century bordering with Vijayanagara kingdom at south.

Although the five sultanates were all ruled by Muslims, their founders were of diverse origins: the Nizam Shahi dynasty, the ruling family of the Ahmadnagar Sultanate, was founded by Malik Hasan Bahri, a Marathi Muslim of Brahmin origin; the Berar Sultanate by a Kannadiga Muslim of Brahmin origin; the Bidar Sultanate by a Georgian slave; the Bijapur Sultanate by a foreigner who may have been a Georgian slave purchased by Mahmud Gawan; and the Golconda Sultanate by a slave of Iranian Turkmen origin.

All the Deccan sultanates based their legitimacy on being the successor states of the Bahmani Sultanate, and continued to use Bahmanid coins instead of issuing their own coins. Although generally rivals, the sultanates did ally with each other against the Vijayanagara Empire in 1565, permanently weakening Vijayanagara in the Battle of Talikota. Notably, the alliance destroyed the entire city of Vijayanagara, with important temples being razed to the ground.

In 1574, after a coup in Berar, Ahmadnagar invaded and conquered it. In 1619, Bidar was annexed by Bijapur. The sultanates were later conquered by the Mughal Empire: Berar was stripped from Ahmadnagar in 1596; Ahmadnagar was completely taken between 1616 and 1636; and Golconda and Bijapur were conquered during Aurangzeb's 1686–87 campaign.

== Ahmadnagar Sultanate ==
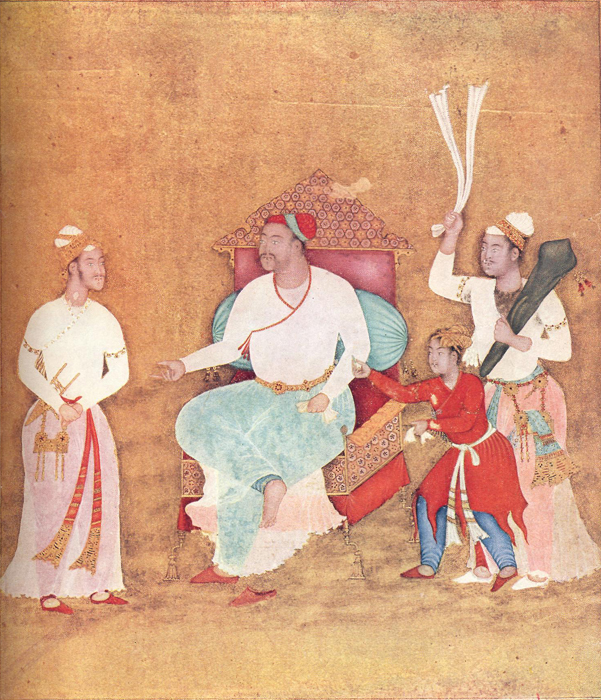
Painting of the Nizam Shahs

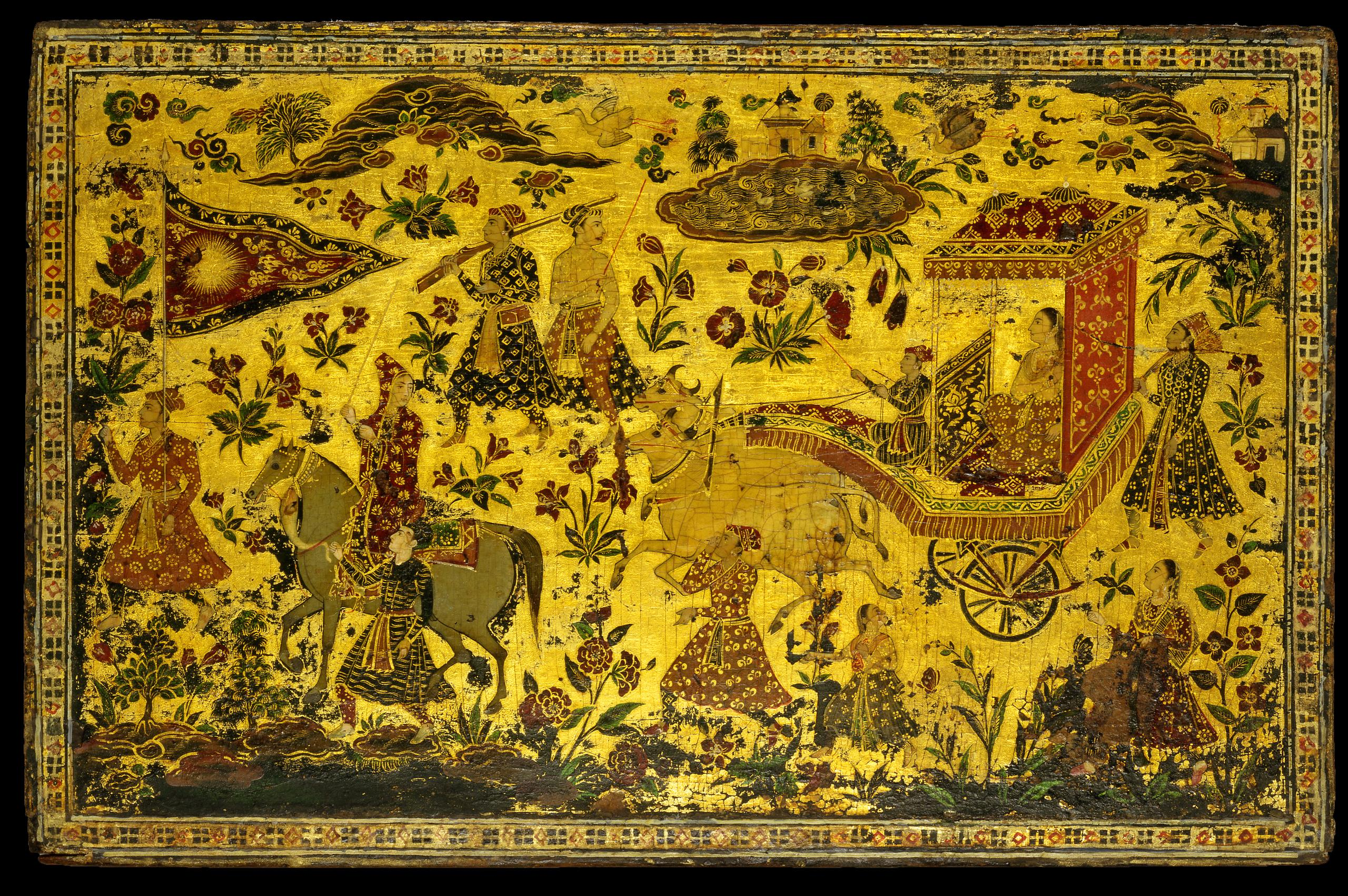
Hunting party, Deccan

The Ahmadnagar Sultanate was founded by Ahmad Nizam Shah, who was the son of Nizam ul-Mulk Malik Hasan Bahri, prominent in Bahmanid politics as the leader of the Deccani Muslim party at the court. Nizam-ul-Mulk Bahri was a military slave, formerly a Hindu Brahmin from Vijayanagar originally named Timapa who converted to Islam, although the Brahmin lineage might have been a genealogical topos rather than fact, which, along with military training, Persian education and conversion by patronage, was meant to share with the origin of the Bahmanid dynasty. He became the regent of Muhammad Shah Bahmani after the former had devised the execution of Mahmud Gawan. As the head of the Sunni Deccani party, Nizam-ul-Mulk led the wholesale massacre of the Shi'a foreigners, especially the Turks and Georgian population in Bidar, by the orders of the Bahmani Sultan. After the politically charged murder of Nizam-ul-Mulk Bahri, and frustrated with the weakened Bahmani Sultan and the factionalised administration at Bidar, the outrated son, Ahmad Nizam Shah, the governor of Junnar, defeated the Bahmani army led by general Jahangir Khan on 28 May 1490, declared independence and established dynastic rule over Ahmadnagar. The territory of the sultanate was located in the northwestern Deccan, between the sultanates of Gujarat and Bijapur. Initially, his capital was in Junnar. In 1494, the foundation was laid for the new capital of Ahmadnagar. Malik Ahmed Shah, after several attempts, secured the fortress of Daulatabad in 1499.

After Malik Ahmed Shah's death in 1510, his son Burhan, a boy of seven, was installed in his place. In 1538, under the influence of Shah Tahir, an Imam, he would establish Nizari Shi'ism as the state religion. Burhan Shah I died in Ahmadnagar in 1553. He left six sons, of whom Hussain succeeded him. After the death of Hussain Shah I in 1565, his son Murtaza (a minor) ascended the throne. While Murtaza was a child, his mother, Khanzada Humayun Sultana, ruled as a regent for several years. Murtaza Shah annexed Berar in 1574. On his death in 1588, his son Miran Hussain ascended the throne; but his reign lasted only a little more than ten months, as he was poisoned. Ismail, a cousin of Miran Hussain was raised to the throne, but the actual power was in the hands of Jamal Khan, the leader of the Deccani group in the court. He led the massacre of foreign nobles at Ahmadnagar, causing all the Persian nobles to flee and take service at Bijapur, including the historian Firishta himself.

"There were massacres (qatl-e 'ām) twice in the city, in the course of which not a single person from abroad was left alive. The killing spree lasted for three days. Good people like learned men and traders, who had assembled here in this period, were all slain, and their houses were destroyed."

Jamal Khan also enforced the Mahdawi religion on the state. He was killed in the battle of Rohankhed in 1591 and soon Ismail Shah was also captured and confined by his father Burhan, who ascended the throne as Burhan Shah II. He reinstated Shia Islam as the state religion. After the death of Burhan Shah, his eldest son Ibrahim ascended the throne. Ibrahim Shah died only after a few months in a battle with the Bijapur Sultanate. Soon, Chand Bibi, the aunt of Ibrahim Shah, proclaimed Bahadur, the infant son of Ibrahim Shah, as the rightful Sultan; and she became regent. In 1596, a Mughal attack led by Murad was repulsed by Chand Bibi.

After the death of Chand Bibi in July 1600, Ahmadnagar was conquered by the Mughals, and Bahadur Shah was imprisoned. But Malik Ambar, and other Ahmadnagar officials, defied the Mughals and declared Murtaza Shah II as sultan in 1600 at a new capital, Paranda. Malik Ambar became prime minister and vakīl-us-saltanat of Ahmadnagar. Later, the capital was shifted first to Junnar and then to a new city called Khadki (later Aurangabad). After the death of Malik Ambar, his son Fath Khan surrendered to the Mughals in 1633 and handed over the young Nizam Shahi ruler Hussain Shah, who was sent as a prisoner to the fort of Gwalior. In a last stand, Shahaji, with the assistance of Bijapur, placed an infant scion of the Nizam Shahi dynasty, Murtaza, on the throne but acted as regent. In 1636, Aurangzeb, the Mughal viceroy of Deccan, finally annexed the sultanate to the Mughal empire, after defeating Shahaji.

=== Rulers ===
1. Malik Ahmad Nizam Shah I (1490–1510)
2. Burhan Nizam Shah I (1510–1553)
3. Hussain Nizam Shah I (1553–1565)
4. Murtaza Nizam Shah I (1565–1588)
5. Hussain Nizam Shah II (1588–1589)
6. Ismail Nizam Shah (1589–1591)
7. Burhan Nizam Shah II (1591–1595)
8. Bahadur Nizam Shah (1595–1600)
9. Murtaza Nizam Shah II (1600–1610)
10. Burhan Nizam Shah III (1610–1631)
11. Hussain Nizam Shah III (1631–1633)
12. Murtaza Nizam Shah III (1633–1636)

== Berar Sultanate ==
The Berar Sultanate was founded by Fathullah Imad-ul-Mulk, who was born a Kannadiga Hindu, but was captured as a boy by the Bahmani forces, which were on an expedition against the Vijayanagara empire, and reared as a Muslim. In 1490, during the disintegration of the Bahmani Sultanate, Imad-ul-Mulk, then governor of Berar, declared independence and founded the Imad Shahi dynasty of the Berar Sultanate. He established the capital at Achalpur (Ellichpur), and the Gavilgad and Narnala were also fortified by him.

Upon his death in 1504, Imad-ul-Mulk was succeeded by his eldest son, Ala-ud-din. In 1528, Ala-ud-din resisted the aggression of Ahmadnagar with help from Bahadur Shah, Sultan of Gujarat. The next ruler of Berar, Darya, first tried to ally with Bijapur, to prevent the aggression of Ahmadnagar, but was unsuccessful. Later, he helped Ahmednagar on three occasions against Bijapur. After his death in 1562, his infant son Burhan succeeded him; but early in Burhan's reign Tufal Khan, one of his ministers, usurped the throne. In 1574, Murtaza I, Sultan of Ahmadnagar, annexed Berar to his sultanate. Burhan, Tufal Khan, and Tufal's son Shamshir-ul-Mulk, were taken to Ahmadnagar and confined to a fortress where all of them subsequently died.

=== Rulers ===
1. Fathullah Imad-ul-Mulk (1490–1504)
2. Aladdin Imad Shah (1504–1530)
3. Darya Imad Shah (1530–1562)
4. Burhan Imad Shah (1562–1574)
5. Tufal Khan (usurper) (After 1562–1574)

== Bidar Sultanate ==
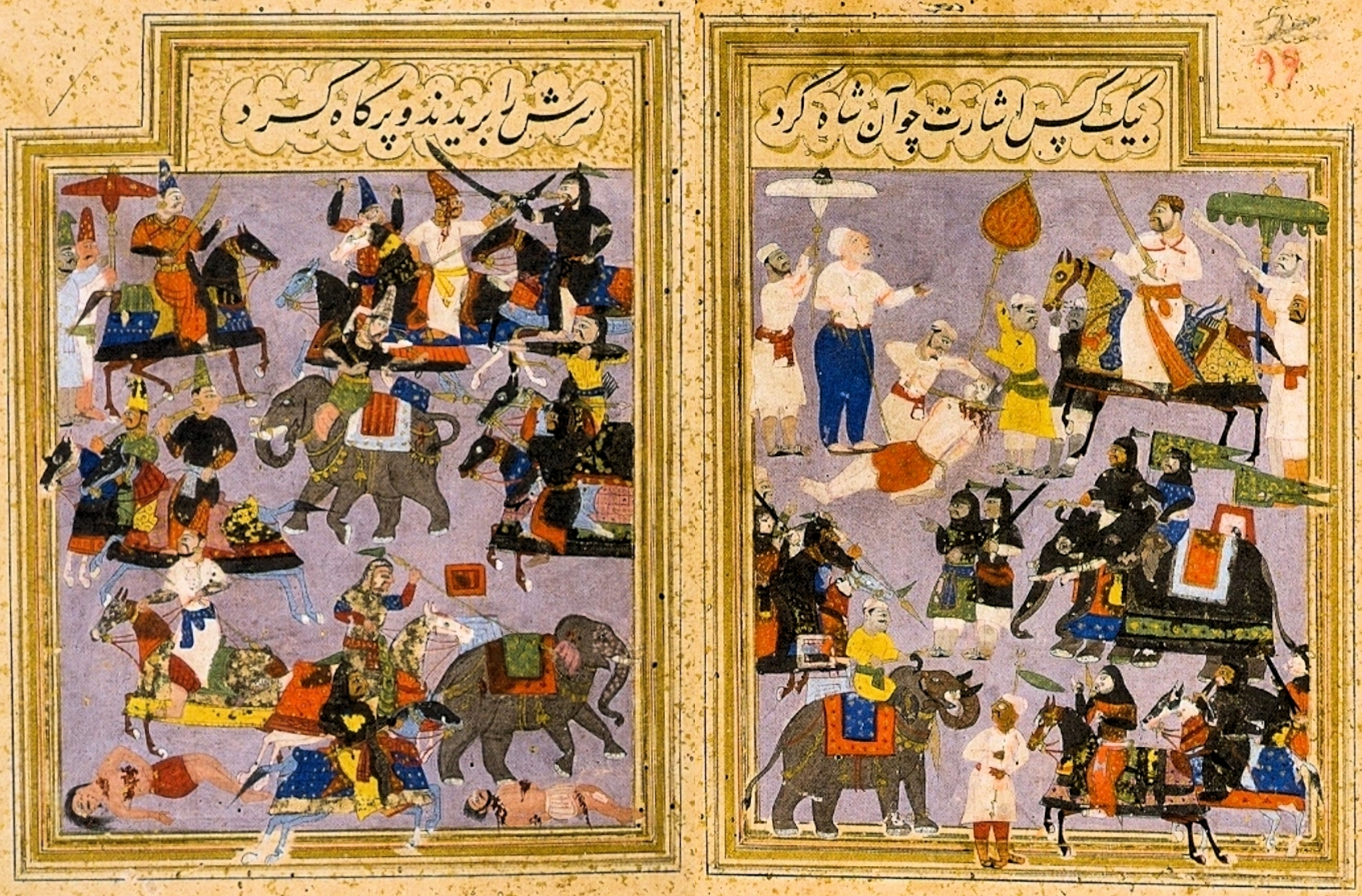
Panorama of the Battle of Talikota (1565). In the right panel, Husain Shah (riding a horse) orders the decapitation of Ramaraya (r. 1542–65), the defeated ruler of the Vijayanagara Empire. Ta'rif-i Husain Shahi (Chronicle of Husain Shah).

Bidar was the smallest of the five Deccan sultanates. The Sultanate was founded by Qasim Barid I, who was a Georgian enslaved by Turks. He joined the service of Bahmani ruler Mahmud Shah Bahmani (r. 1482–1518) as a sar-naubat (commander), and later became a mir-jumla (governor) of the Bahmani Sultanate. In 1492, he became de facto ruler of Bahmani, although Sultan Mahmud Shah Bahmani remained as the nominal ruler.

After Mahmud Shah Bahmani's death in 1504, his son Amir Barid controlled the administration of the Bahmani Sultanate. In 1528, with the flight of the last Bahmani ruler, Kalimullah, from Bidar, Amir Barid became practically an independent ruler. Amir Barid was succeeded by his son Ali Barid, who was the first to assume the title of shah. Ali Barid participated in the Battle of Talikota and was fond of poetry and calligraphy.

The last ruler of the Bidar Sultanate, Amir Barid Shah III, was defeated in 1619, and the sultanate was annexed to the Bijapur Sultanate.

=== Rulers ===
1. Qasim Barid I (1492–1504)
2. Amir Barid I (1504–1542)
3. Ali Barid Shah I (1542–1580)
4. Ibrahim Barid Shah (1580–1587)
5. Qasim Barid Shah II (1587–1591)
6. Ali Barid Shah II (1591)
7. Amir Barid Shah II (1591–1600)
8. Mirza Ali Barid Shah III (1600–1609)
9. Amir Barid Shah III (1609–1619)

== Bijapur Sultanate ==
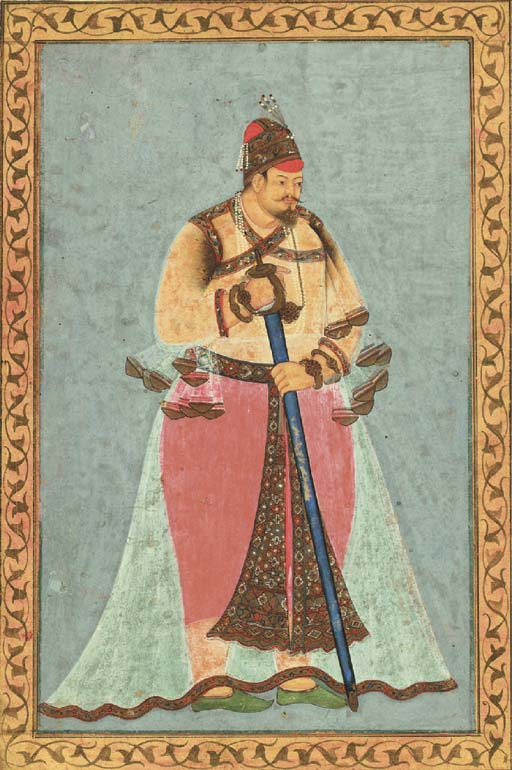
Ibrahim Adil Shah II

Located in southwestern India, straddling the Western Ghats range of southern Maharashtra and northern Karnataka, the Bijapur Sultanate was ruled by the Adil Shahi dynasty from 1490 to 1686. The founder of the dynasty, Yusuf Adil Shah, may have been a Georgian slave who was purchased by Mahmud Gawan. Other historians have mentioned him as of Persian or Turkmen origin. Yusuf was originally a provincial governor of the Bahmani Sultanate; in 1490, he attained de facto independence. In 1510, a Portuguese colonial expedition succeeded in conquering the Adil Shahi port of Goa. Ismail Adil Shah, Yusuf's son, and his successors embellished the capital at Bijapur with numerous monuments.

Ibrahim Adil Shah I switched to a Deccani Muslim identity, and converted strongly to Sunni Islam, the religion of the Deccani Muslims. He deviated from the traditions of his predecessor and introduced many innovations in the political and religious policies, discontinuing previous Shia practices and restoring the exercise of the Sunni Islamic practices. He degraded most of the Afaqi (foreign) faction (with a few exceptions), and in their place enrolled the Deccani Muslims to services. Consequently, he brought Sunni Muslims to power and ended Shia domination by dismissing them from their posts

The Adil Shahis fought the Vijayanagara Empire, which lay to the south, across the Tungabhadra River, but fought the other Deccan sultanates as well. Four of the five sultanates combined forces to decisively defeat Vijayanagara at the Battle of Talikota in 1565. After the battle, the empire broke up, and Bijapur seized control of the Raichur Doab. In 1619, the Adil Shahis conquered the neighbouring sultanate of Bidar, which was incorporated into their realm.

Later in the 17th century, the Marathas revolted successfully under Shivaji's leadership, captured major parts of the sultanate, and its capital, Bijapur. The weakened sultanate was conquered by Aurangzeb in 1686 with the fall of Bijapur, bringing the dynasty to an end.

=== Rulers ===
1. Yusuf Adil Shah (1490–1510)
2. Ismail Adil Shah (1510–1534)
3. Mallu Adil Shah (1534–1535)
4. Ibrahim Adil Shah I (1535–1558)
5. Ali Adil Shah I (1558–1580)
6. Ibrahim Adil Shah II (1580–1627)
7. Mohammed Adil Shah (1627–1656)
8. Ali Adil Shah II (1656–1672)
9. Sikandar Adil Shah (1672–1686)

== Golconda Sultanate ==
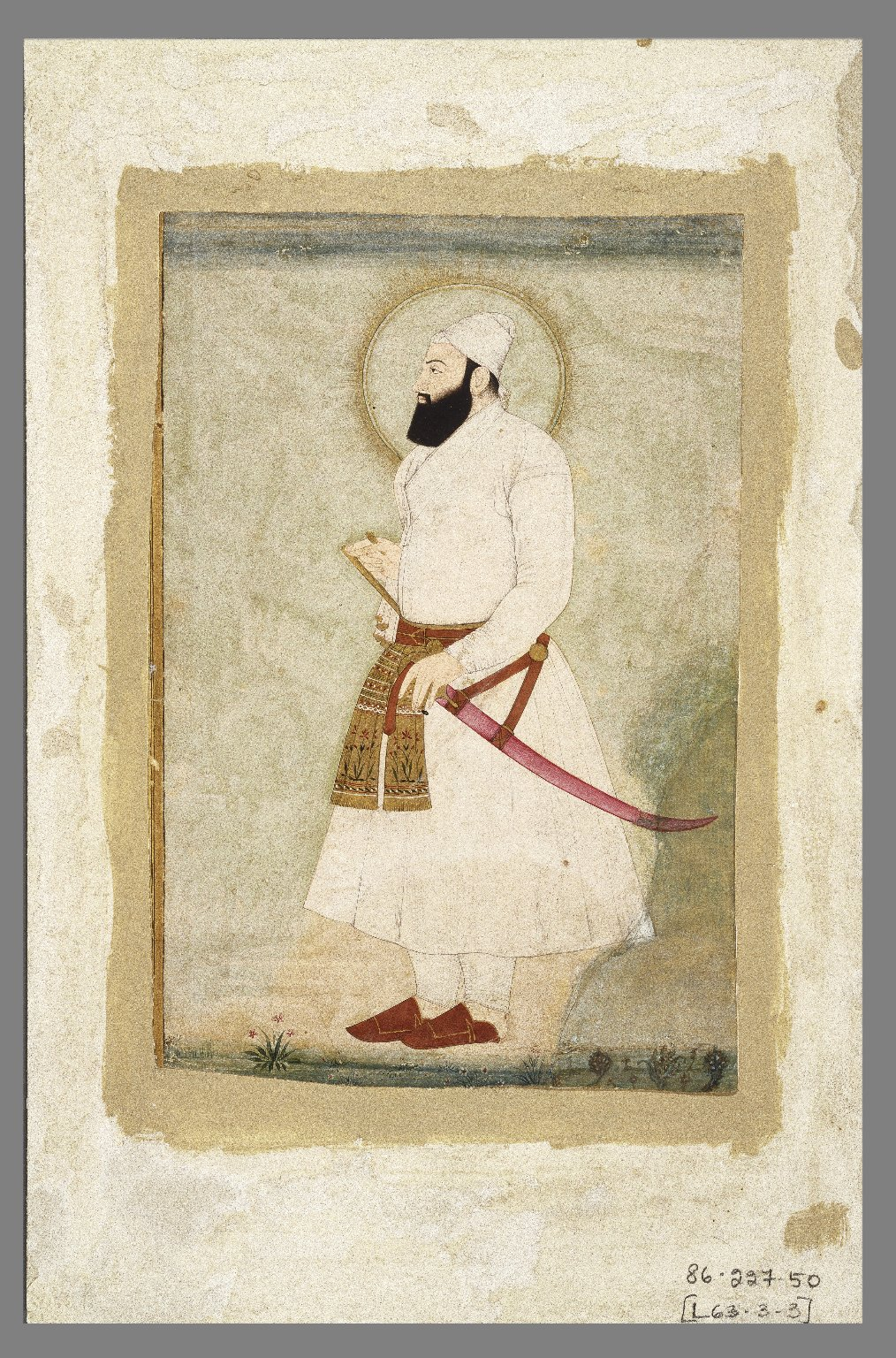
A manuscript depicting the painting of Abul Hasan Qutb Shah the last ruler of the Golconda Sultanate.

The dynasty's founder, Sultan Quli Qutb-ul-Mulk, migrated to Delhi from Persia with some of his relatives and friends in the beginning of the 16th century. Later he migrated south to the Deccan and served the Bahmani Sultan Mohammed Shah I. Quli Qutb-ul-Mulk conquered Golconda and became the governor of the Telangana region in 1518, after the disintegration of the Bahmani sultanate. Soon after, he declared his independence and took the title of Qutb Shah.

The dynasty ruled for 175 years, until the Mughal emperor Aurangzeb's army besieged and conquered Golconda in 1687.

=== Rulers ===
1. Sultan Quli Qutb-ul-Mulk (1512–1543)
2. Jamsheed Quli Qutb Shah (1543–1550)
3. Subhan Quli Qutb Shah (1550)
4. Ibrahim Quli Qutub Shah (1550–1580)
5. Muhammad Quli Qutb Shah (1580–1611)
6. Sultan Muhammad Qutb Shah (1611–1626)
7. Abdullah Qutb Shah (1626–1672)
8. Abul Hasan Qutb Shah (1672–1687)

== Cultural contributions ==
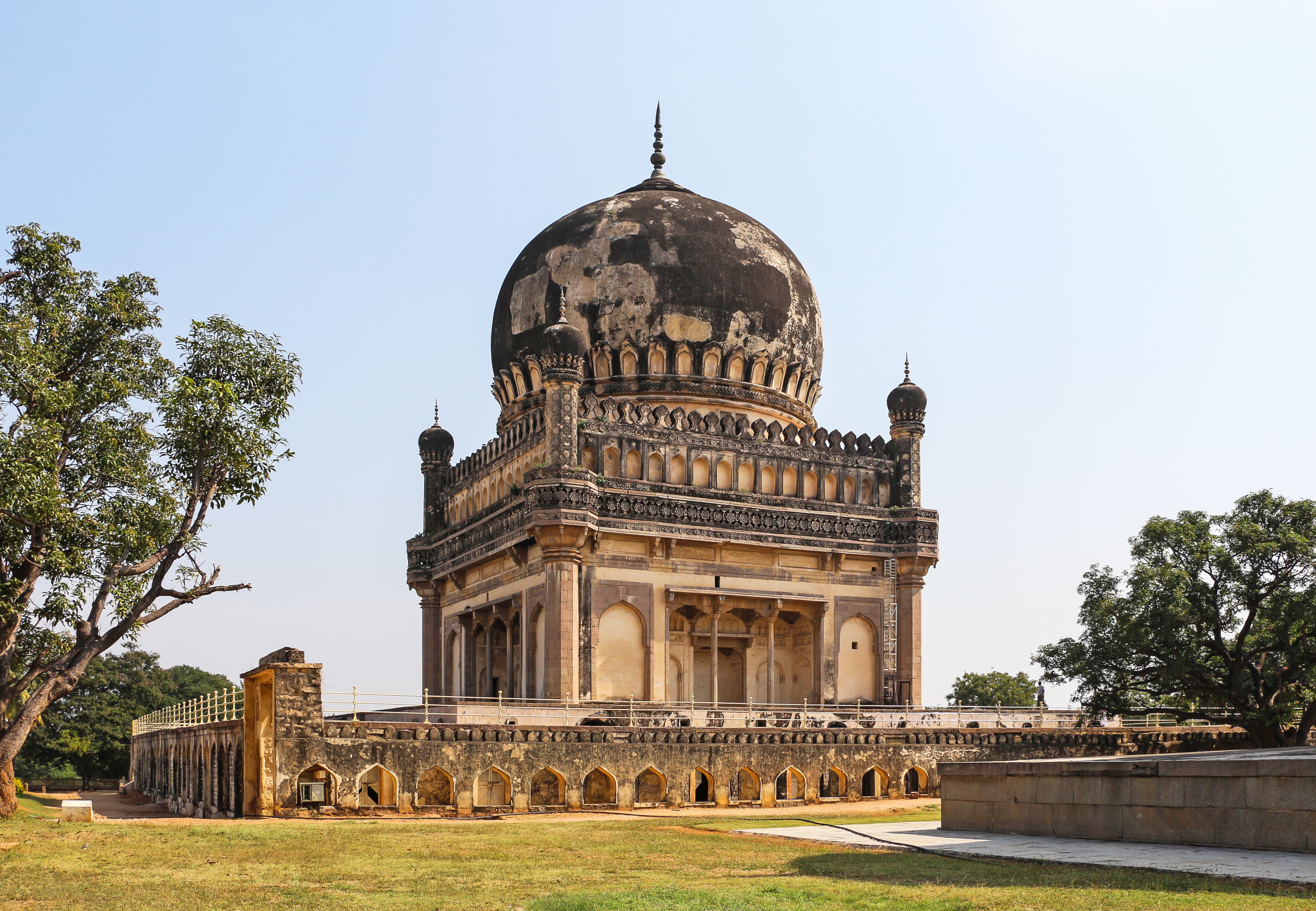
One of the Qutb Shahi tombs (Golconda Sultanate)

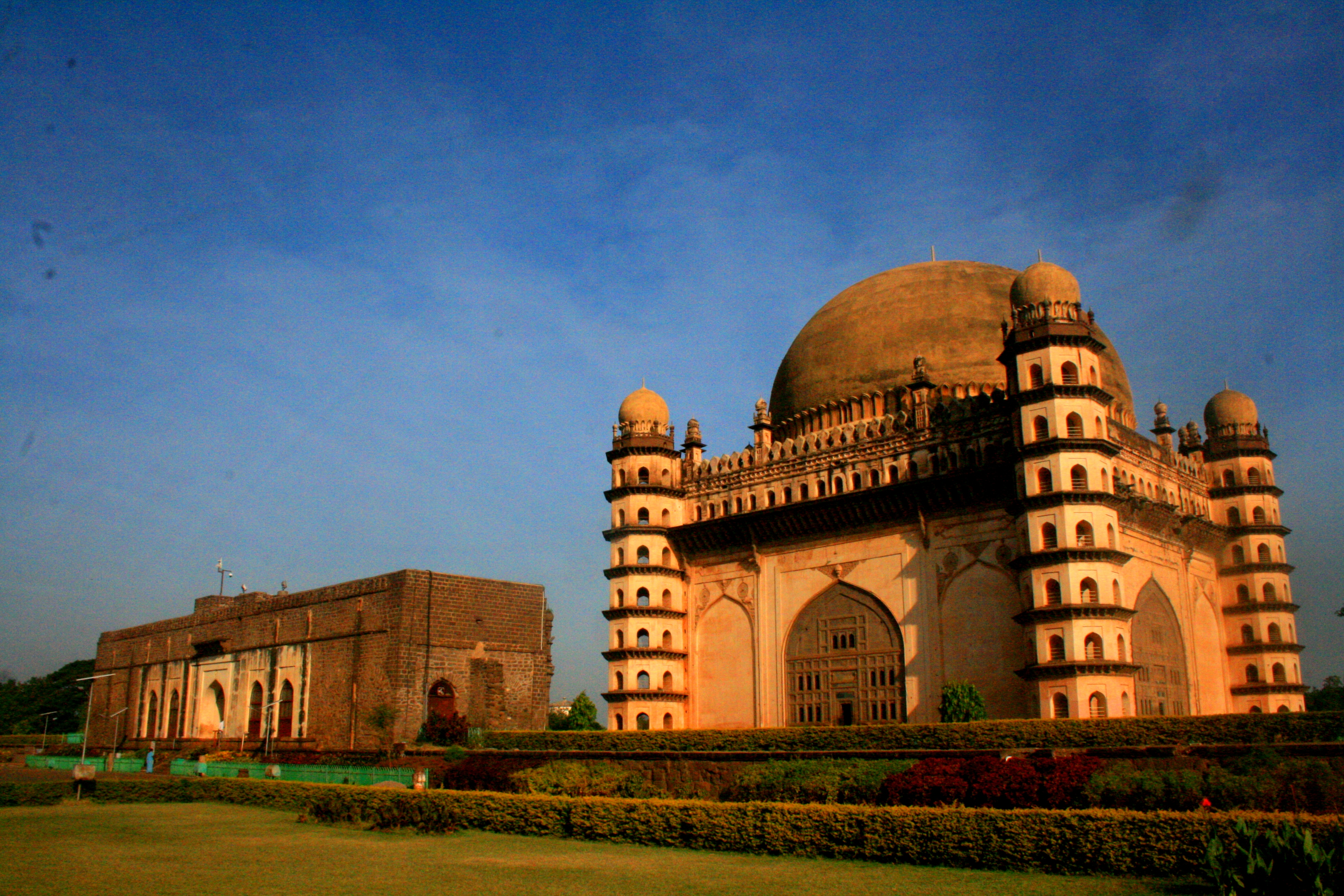
Gol Gumbaz (Bijapur Sultanate)

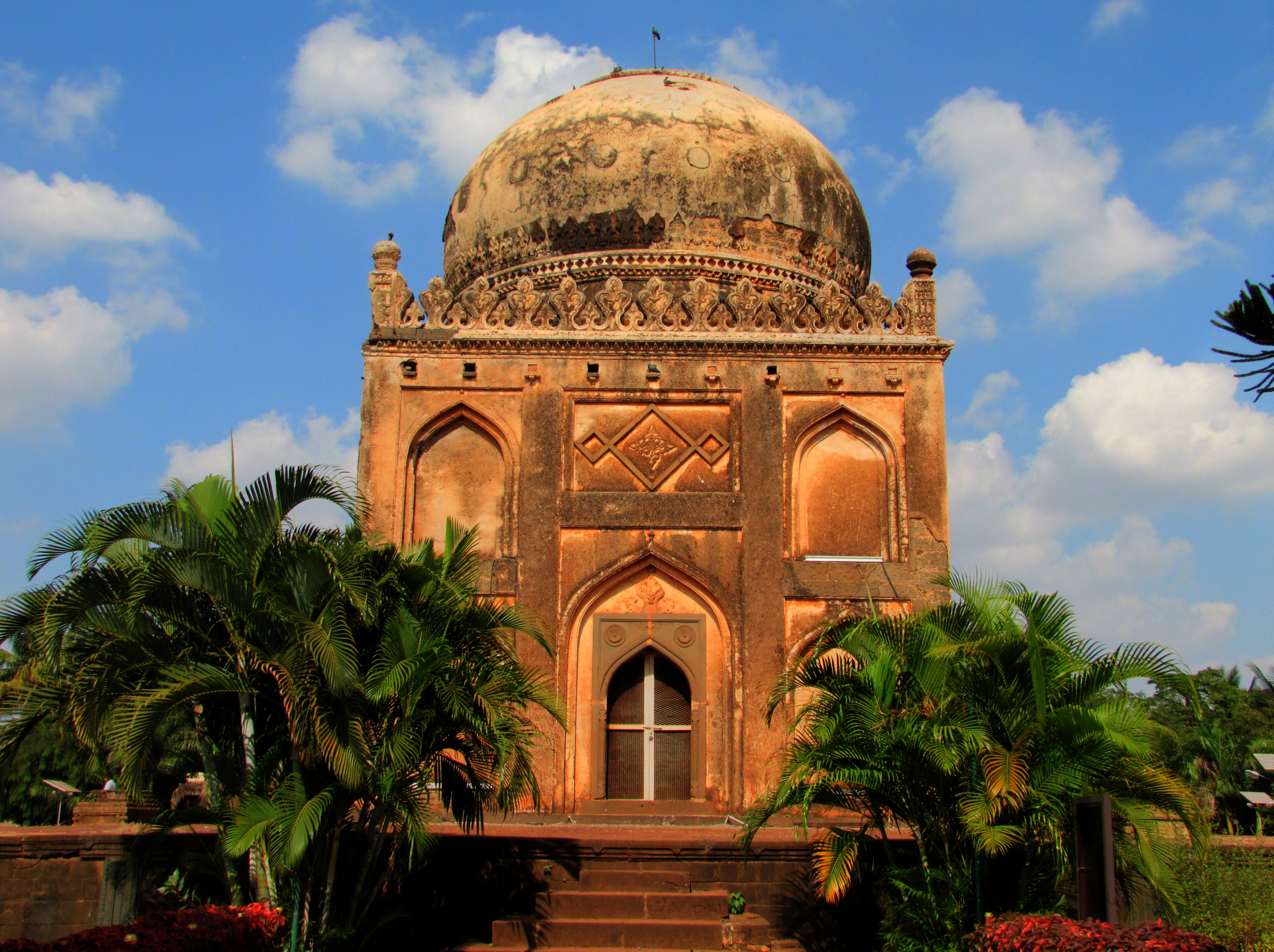
One of the Barid Shahi tombs (Bidar Sultanate)

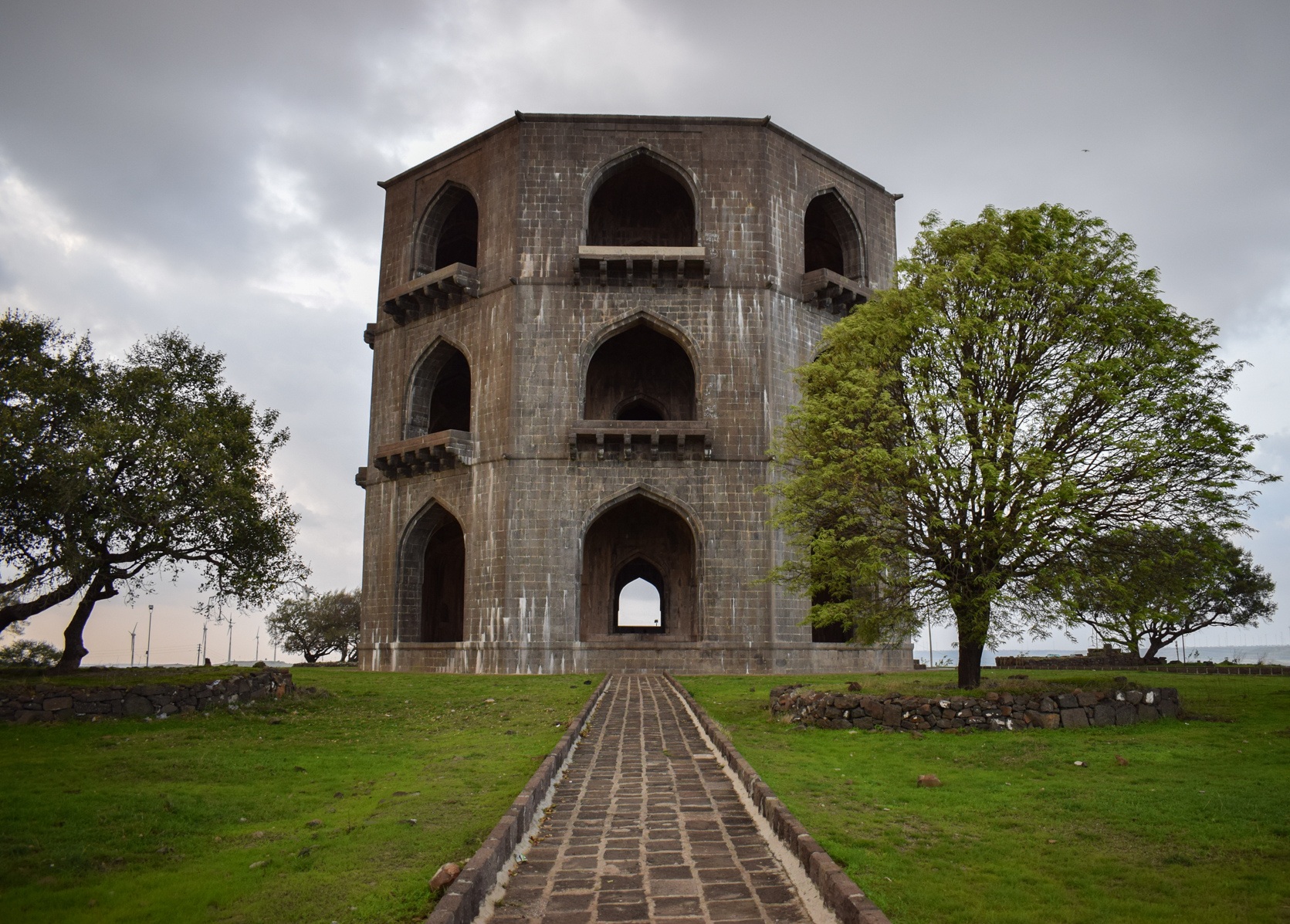
Tomb of Salabat Khan II (Ahmednagar Sultanate)

The rulers of the Deccan Sultanates were buried in elaborate tombs of similar styles. Important members of the royal family and courtiers were also buried in tombs.

The rulers of the Deccan sultanates made a number of cultural contributions in the fields of literature, art, architecture, and music.

An important contribution was the development of the Dakhani language, which, having started development under the Bahamani rulers, developed into an independent spoken and literary language during this period by continuously borrowing from Arabic-Persian, Marathi, Kannada, and Telugu. Dakhani later became known as Dakhani Urdu to distinguish it from North Indian Urdu.

Deccani miniature painting—which flourished in the courts of Ahmadnagar, Bijapur, and Golconda—is another major cultural contribution of the Deccan sultanates.

Architectural splendours of the Deccan such as Charminar and Gol Gumbaz belong to this period. A number of monuments built by the Deccan Sultanates are on a tentative list for nomination as a UNESCO World Heritage Site. The religious tolerance displayed by the Nizam Shahi, Adil Shahi, and Qutb Shahi rulers is also worthy of mention.

=== Ahmadnagar ===
The Nizam Shahi rulers of Ahmadnagar enthusiastically patronised miniature painting, the earliest surviving of which are found as the illustrations of the manuscript Tarif-i-Hussain Shahi (c. 1565), which is now in the Bharat Itihas Sanshodhak Mandal, Pune. A miniature painting of Murtaza Nizam Shah (c. 1575) is in the Bibliothèque Nationale of Paris, while another one is in the Raza Library in Rampur. The Running Elephant is in an American private collection, the Royal Picnic is in the India Office Library in London, and the Young Prince Embraced by a Small Girl, most likely belonging to the Burhan Nizam Shah II period, is in the Edwin Binney 3rd Collection of South Asian Works in the San Diego Museum of Art.

The earliest notable architecture of the Nizam Shahi rulers of Ahmadnagar is the tomb of Ahmad Shah I Bahri (1509), at the centre of Bagh Rouza, a garden complex. The Jami Masjid also belongs to the same period. The Mecca Masjid, built in 1525 by Rumi Khan, a Turkish artillery officer of Burhan Nizam Shah I, is original in its design. The Kotla complex was constructed in 1537 as a religious educational institution. The impressive Farah Bagh was the centrepiece of a large palatial complex completed in 1583. Other monuments in Ahmednagar of the Nizam Shahi period are the Do Boti Chira (tomb of Sharja Khan, 1562), Damri Masjid (1568), and the tomb of Rumi Khan (1568). The Jami Masjid (1615) in Khirki (Aurangabad) and the Chini Mahal inside the Daulatabad fort were constructed during the late Nizam Shahi period (1600–1636). The tomb of Malik Ambar in Khuldabad (1626) is another impressive monument of this period. The Kali Masjid of Jalna (1578) and the tomb of Dilawar Khan (1613) in Rajgurunagar also belong to this period.

During the reign of Ahmad Shah I Bahri, his keeper of imperial records, Dalapati, wrote an encyclopaedic work, the Nrisimha Prasada, where he mentioned his overlord as Nizamsaha. It is a notable instance of the religious tolerance of the Nizam Shahi rulers.

=== Berar ===
The ruined palace of Hauz Katora, 3 kilometres (1.9 mi) west of Achalpur, is the only notable surviving Imad Shahi monument.

=== Bidar ===
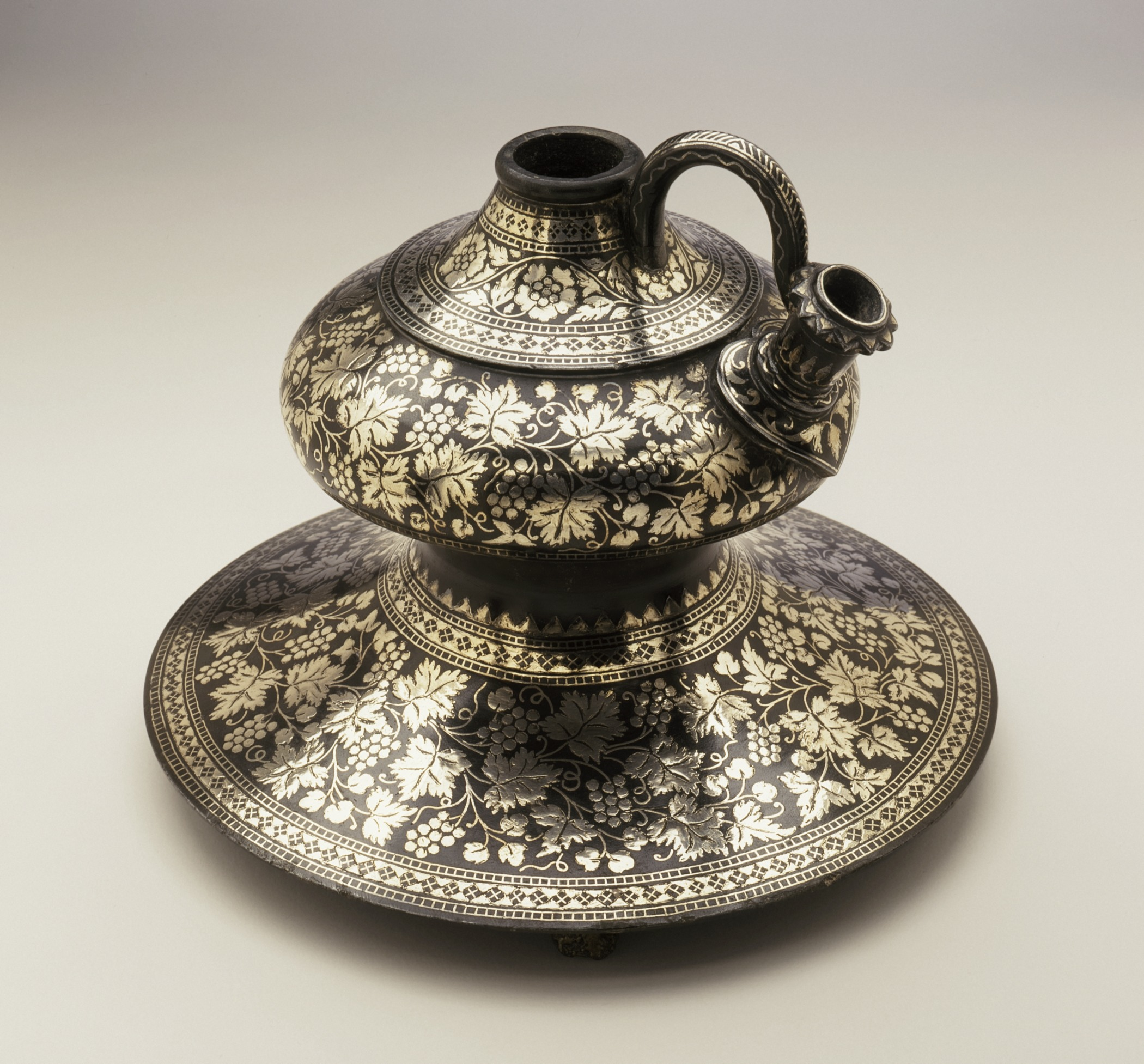
Bidriware water-pipe base, c. 18th century, Los Angeles County Museum of Art

The main architectural activities for the Barid Shahi rulers were building garden tombs. The tomb of Ali Barid Shah (1577) is the most notable monument in Bidar. The tomb consists of a lofty domed chamber, open on four sides, located in the middle of a Persian four-square garden. The Rangin Mahal in Bidar, built during the reign of Ali Barid Shah, is a complete and exquisitely decorated courtly structure. Other important monuments in Bidar from this period are the tomb of Qasim II and the Kali Masjid.

An important class of metalwork known as Bidriware originated in Bidar. This metalwork consists of a black metal, usually a zinc alloy, inlaid with intricate designs in silver, brass, and sometimes copper.

=== Bijapur ===
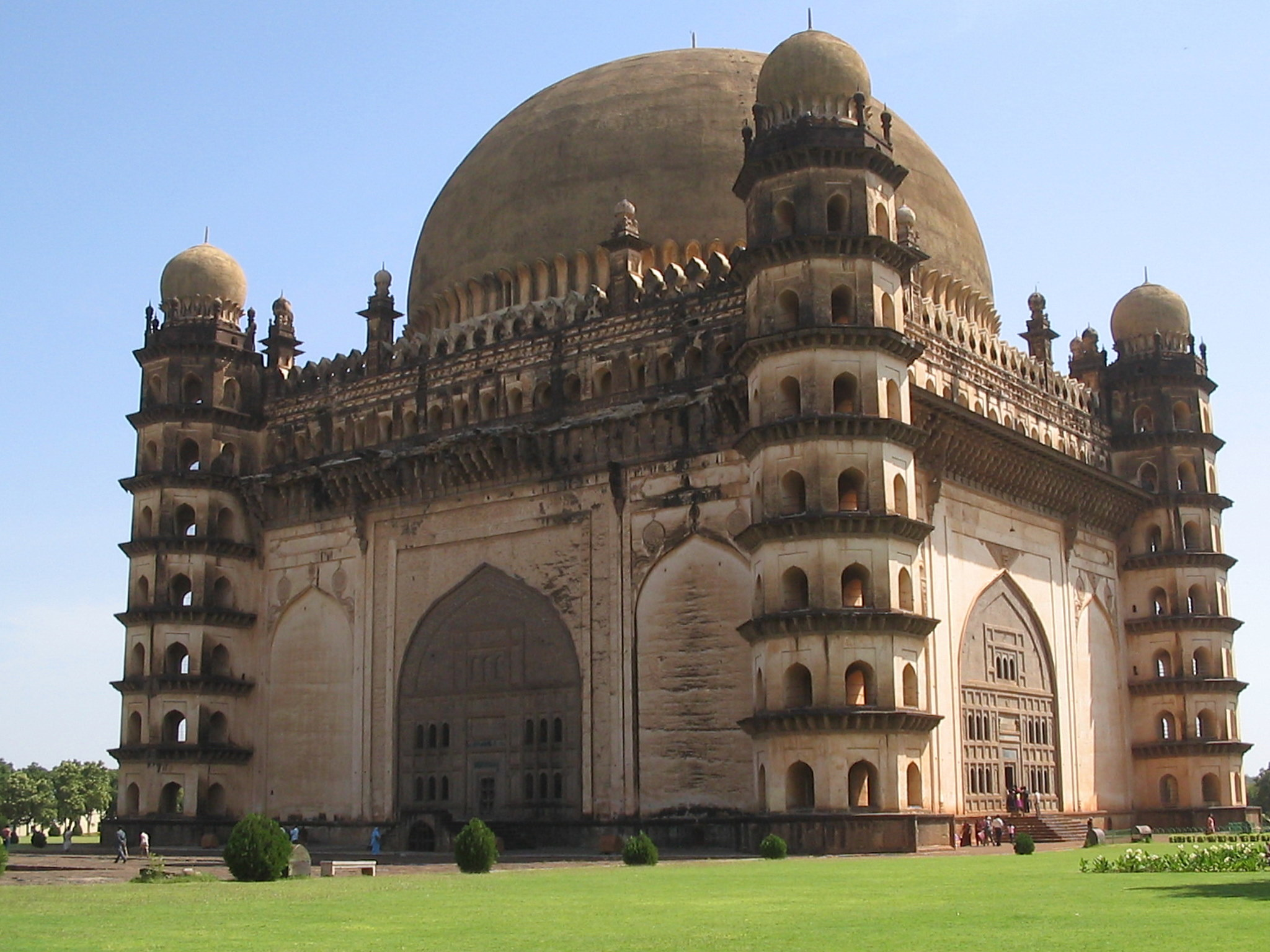
Gol Gumbaz, mausoleum of Mohammed Adil Shah

The Adil Shahi rulers contributed greatly to architecture, art, literature, and music, as Bijapur developed into a cosmopolitan city under their rule and attracted many scholars, artists, musicians, and Sufi saints from Rome, Iran, Iraq, Turkey, and Turkestan. The Adil Shahi kings were known for their tolerance towards Hindus and non-interference in their religious matters. They employed Hindus to high posts, especially as officers overseeing accounts and administration, whose documents were maintained in Marathi.

Amongst the major architectural works in the Bijapur Sultanate, one of the earliest is the unfinished Jami Masjid, which was begun by Ali Adil Shah I in 1576. It has an arcaded prayer hall, with fine aisles, and has an impressive dome supported by massive piers. One of the most impressive monuments built during the reign of Ibrahim II was the Ibrahim Rouza which was originally planned as a tomb for queen Taj Sultana, but was later converted into the tomb for Ibrahim Adil Shah II and his family. This complex, completed in 1626, consists of a paired tomb and mosque. Ibrahim II also planned to construct a new twin city to Bijapur, Nauraspur, whose construction began in 1599 but was never completed. The greatest monument in Bijapur is the Gol Gumbaz, the mausoleum of Muhammad Adil Shah, which was completed in 1656, and whose hemispherical dome measures 44 metres (144 ft) across. The other important architectural works from this period are the Chini Mahal, the Jal Mandir, the Sat Manzil, the Gagan Mahal, the Anand Mahal, and the Asar Mahal (1646), all in Bijapur, as well as the Kummatgi (16 kilometres (9.9 mi) from Bijapur), the Panhala Fort (20 kilometres (12 mi) from Kolhapur), and Naldurg Fort (45 kilometres (28 mi) from Solapur).

Persian artists of the Adil Shahi court have left a rare treasure of miniature paintings, some of which are well preserved in Europe's museums. The earliest miniature paintings are ascribed to the period of Ali Adil Shah I. The most significant of them are the paintings in the manuscript of Nujum-ul-Ulum (Stars of Science) (1570), kept in the Chester Beatty Library in Dublin, which contains about 400 miniature paintings. Two other illustrated manuscripts from the period of Ali Adil Shah I are Jawahir-al Musiqat-i-Muhammadi in the British Library, which contains 48 paintings, and a Marathi commentary of Sarangadeva's Sangita Ratnakara kept in the museum of City Palace, Jaipur, which contains 4 paintings. But the most miniature paintings come from the time of Sultan Ibrahim Adil Shah II. One of the most celebrated painters of his court was Maulana Farrukh Hussain. The miniature paintings of this period are preserved in the Bikaner Palace, the Bodleian Library in Oxford, the British Museum and Victoria and Albert Museum in London, the Muśee Guimet in Paris, the Academy of Sciences in St. Petersberg, and the Náprstek Museum in Prague.

Under the Adil Shahi rulers many literary works were published in Dakhani. Ibrahim Adil Shah II himself wrote a book of songs, Kitab-i-Nauras, in Dakhani. This book contains a number of songs whose tunes are set to different ragas and raginis. In his songs, he praised the Hindu goddess Sarasvati along with Muhammad and Sufi saint Khwaja Banda Nawaz Gesudaraz. A unique tambur (lute) known as Moti Khan was in his possession. The famous Persian poet laureate Muhammad Zuhuri was his court poet. The Mushaira (poetic symposium) was born in the Bijapur court and later travelled north.

=== Golconda ===
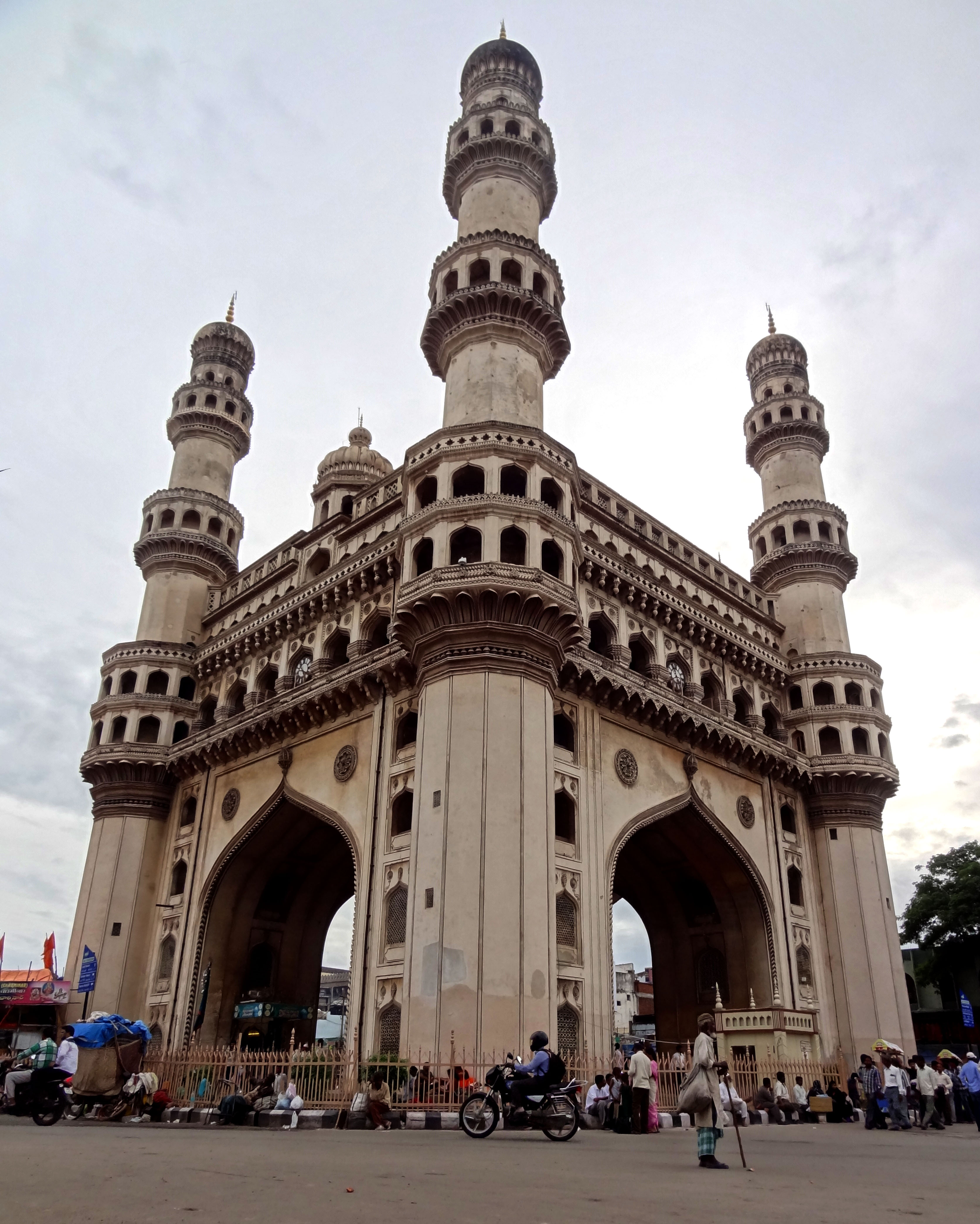
The Charminar built by Mohammed Quli Qutb Shah is a centrepiece of Hyderabad and one of the most important examples of Indo-Islamic architecture.

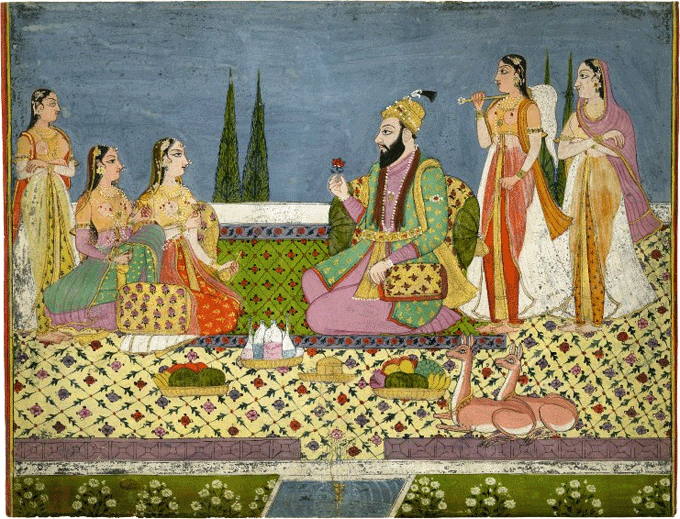
Abdullah Qutb Shah on a Terrace with Attendants, c. 18th century.

Qutb Shahi rulers appointed Hindus in important administrative posts. Ibrahim Quli Qutb Shah appointed Murari Rao as Peshwa, second to only Mir Jumla (prime minister).

One of the earliest architectural achievements of the Qutb Shahi dynasty is the fortified city of Golconda, which is now in ruins. The nearby Qutb Shahi tombs are also noteworthy. In the 16th century, Muhammad Quli Qutb Shah decided to shift the capital to Hyderabad, 8 kilometres (5.0 mi) east of Golconda. Here, he constructed the most original monument in the Deccan, the Charminar, in the heart of the new city. This monument, completed in 1591, has four minarets, each 56 metres (184 ft). The construction of the Mecca Masjid, located immediately south of the Charminar, was started in 1617, during the reign of Muhammad Qutb Shah, but completed only in 1693. The other important monuments of this period are the Toli Masjid, Shaikpet Sarai, Khairtabad Mosque, Taramati Baradari, Hayat Bakshi Mosque, and the Jama Masjid at Gandikota.

The Qutb Shahi rulers invited many Persian artists, such as Shaykh Abbasi and Muhammad Zaman, to their court, whose art made a profound impact on the miniature paintings of this period. The earliest miniature paintings were the 126 illustrations in the manuscript of Anwar-i-Suhayli (c. 1550–1560) in the Victoria and Albert Museum. The illustrations Sindbad Namah in the India Office Library and Shirin and Khusrau in the Khudabaksh Library in Patna most probably belong to the reign of Ibrahim Quli Qutb Shah. The 5 illustrations in a manuscript of the Diwan-i-Hafiz (c. 1630) in the British Museum, London, belong to the reign of Abdullah Qutb Shah. The most outstanding surviving Golconda painting probably is the Procession of Sultan Abdullah Qutb Shah Riding an Elephant (c. 1650) in the Saltykov-Shtshedrine State Public Library in St. Petersberg. Their painting style lasted even after the dynasty was extinct and evolved into the Hyderabad style.

The Qutb Shahi rulers were great patrons of literature and invited many scholars, poets, historians and Sufi saints from Iran to settle in their sultanate. The sultans patronised literature in Persian as well as Telugu, the local language. However, the most important contribution of the Golconda Sultanate in the field of literature is the development of the Dakhani language. Muhammad Quli Qutb Shah was not only a great patron of art and literature but also a poet of a high order. He wrote in Dakhani, Persian, and Telugu and left an extensive Diwan (collection of poetry) in Dakhani, known as Kulliyat-i-Muhammad Quli Qutb Shah. Apart from the praise of God and the Prophet, he also wrote on nature, love and contemporary social life. Kshetrayya and Bhadrachala Ramadasu are some notable Telugu poets of this period.

The Qutb Shahi rulers were much more liberal than their other Muslim counterparts. During the reign of Abdullah Qutb Shah, in 1634, the ancient Indian sex manual Koka Shastra was translated into Persian and named Lazzat-un-Nisa (Flavours of the Woman).

== See also ==
- Malwa Sultanate
- Khandesh Sultanate
- Bengal Sultanate
- Muslim conquests in the Indian subcontinent
- Adil Shahi–Portuguese conflicts

== Citations ==
=== Sources ===
- Chandra, Satish (2014). History of Medieval India 800–1700 A.D. Orient BlackSwan. ISBN 9788125032267.
- Bosworth, Clifford Edmund (1996). The New Islamic Dynasties. Columbia University Press.
- Majumdar, R.C. (1962). The Delhi Sultanate. Mumbai: Bharatiya Vidya Bhavan.
- Majumdar, R.C. (1974). The Mughul Empire. Mumbai: Bharatiya Vidya Bhavan.
- Mitchell, George; Zebrowski, Mark (1999). Architecture and Art of the Deccan Sultanates (The New Cambridge History of India Vol. I:7). Cambridge: Cambridge University Press. ISBN 9780521563215.
- Sen, Sailendra (2013). A Textbook of Medieval Indian History. Primus Books. ISBN 978-9-38060-734-4.
- Sherwani, Haroon Khan (1973). History of Medieval Deccan (1295–1724) : Volume I. Government of Andhra Pradesh.
- Sohoni, Pushkar (2018). The Architecture of a Deccan Sultanate: Courtly Practice and Royal Authority in Late Medieval India. London: I.B.Tauris. ISBN 9781784537944.
- Yazdani, Ghulam (1947). Bidar, Its History and Monuments. Oxford University Press.
