= Deccanis =

Ethnoreligious community in India

Deccani
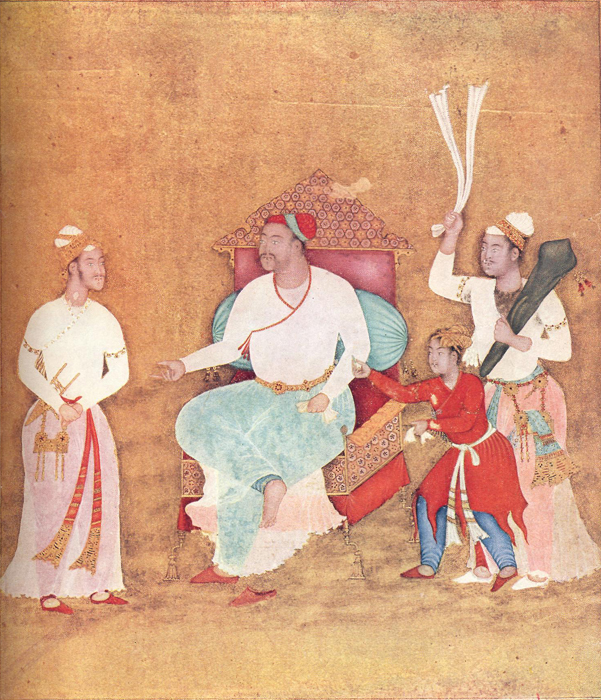

Total population
- 11,747,400 (2011)

Regions with significant populations
- India • Saudi Arabia • Pakistan • United Arab Emirates • United States of America • United Kingdom • Canada • Turkey

Languages
- Deccani

Religion
- Islam; Majority; Sunni Islam; Minority; Shia (incl. Isma'ilism and Twelver Shi'ism)

Related ethnic groups
- • Hyderabadi Muslims • Muhajir people

The Deccanis or Deccani people are an Indo-Aryan ethno-religious community of Deccani-speaking Muslims who inhabit or are from the Deccan region of India. The community traces its origins to the shifting of the Delhi Sultanate's capital from Delhi to Daulatabad in 1327 during the reign of Muhammad bin Tughluq. Further ancestry can also be traced from immigrant Muslims referred to as Afaqis, also known as Pardesis who came from Central Asia, Iraq and Iran and had settled in the Deccan region during the Bahmani Sultanate (1347). The migration of Muslim Hindavi-speaking people to the Deccan and intermarriage with the local Hindus who converted to Islam, led to the creation of a new community of Hindustani-speaking Muslims, known as the Deccani, who would come to play an important role in the politics of the Deccan. Their language, Deccani, emerged as a language of linguistic prestige and culture during the Bahmani Sultanate, further evolving in the Deccan Sultanates.

Following the demise of the Bahmanis, the Deccan Sultanate period marked a golden age for Deccani culture, notably in the arts, language, and architecture. The Deccani people form significant minorities in the Deccan, including the Maharashtran regions of Marathwada and Vidarbha, and the states of Telangana, Andhra Pradesh, Karnataka (except Tulu Nadu) and northern Tamil Nadu. They form a majority in the old cities of Hyderabad and Aurangabad. After the Partition of India and the annexation of Hyderabad, large diaspora communities formed outside the Deccan, especially in Pakistan, where they make up a significant portion of the Urdu speaking minority, the Muhajirs.

The Deccani people are further divided into various groups that can broadly be lumped into three: the Hyderabadis (from Hyderabad State); Mysoris (from Mysore state, including Bangalore), and Madrasis (from Madras state, including Kurnool, Nellore, Guntur and Chennai). Deccani is the mother tongue of most Muslims in the states of Karnataka, Telangana and Andhra Pradesh, and it is spoken by a section of Muslims in Maharashtra, Goa, Kerala and Tamil Nadu.

== History ==
The word Deccani (Persian: دکنی from Prakrit dakkhin "south") was derived in the court of Bahmani rulers in 1487 AD during Sultan Mahmood Shah Bahmani II.

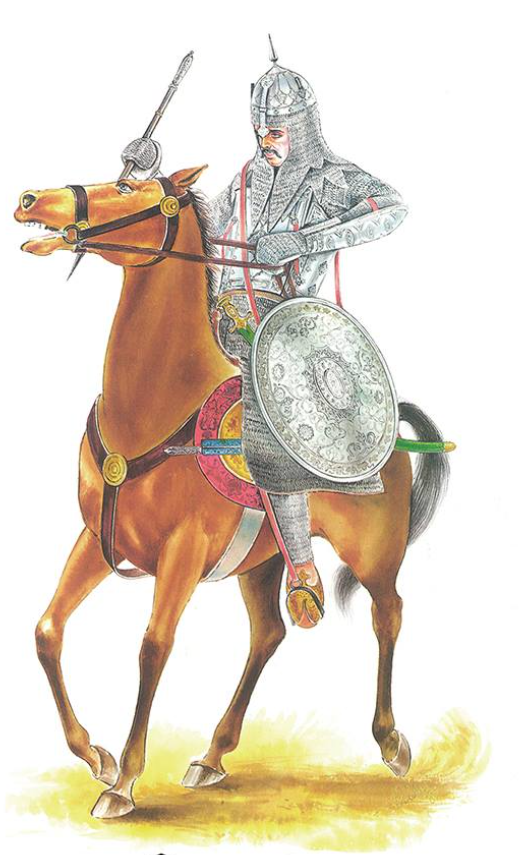
A medieval Deccani Muslim horseman

Map of the Bahmanid empire

The Bahmanid empire was founded by Hasan Gangu, or also known as Zafar Khan, a ruler of Afghan or Turk origin. following the Rebellion of Ismail Mukh. Hasan Gangu revolted against the Tughlaq dynasty of the Delhi Sultanate, with the revolt being led by another Afghan, named Ismail Mukh. Ismail Mukh succeeded and then abdicated in favor of Zafar Khan, who founded the Bahmani Sultanate. Hasan Gangu was one of the inhabitants of Delhi who were forced to immigrate to Daulatabad in the during the Delhi Sultanate, with the purpose of building a large Muslim urban centre in the Deccan.

=== Vijayanagara Wars ===
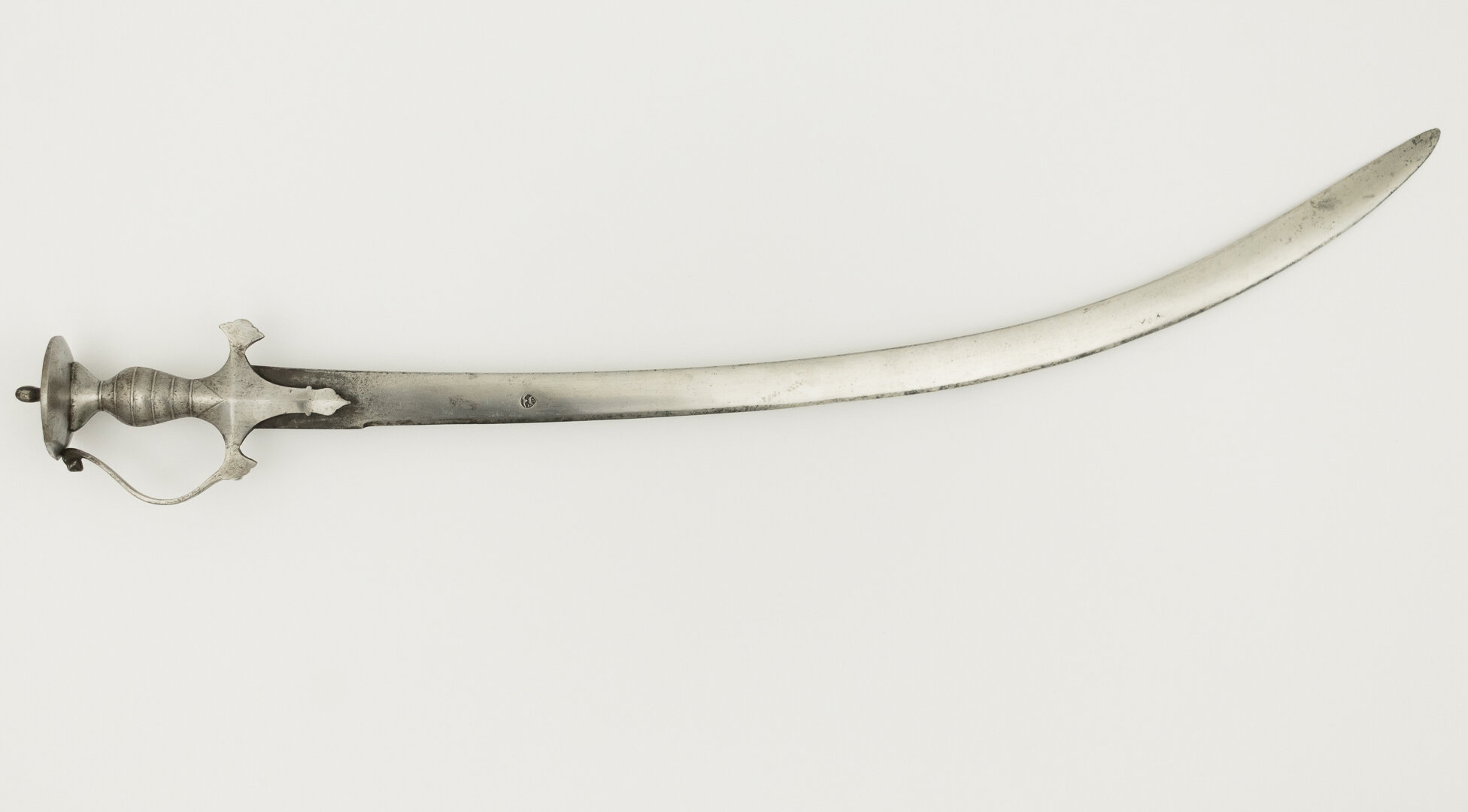
All Steel Deccani Sword, the Tulwar

The Bahmanids' aggressive confrontation with the two main Hindu kingdoms of the southern Deccan, Warangal and Vijayanagar, made them renowned among Muslims as warriors of the faith. Ahmad Shah Bahmani I conquered Warangal kingdom in 1425, annexing it to the empire. The Vijayanagar empire, which had subdued the Madurai Sultanate after a conflict lasting four decades, found a natural enemy in the Bahmanids of the northern Deccan, over the control of the Godavari-basin, Tungabadhra Doab, and the Marathwada country, although they seldom required a pretext for declaring war. Military conflicts between the Bahmanids and Vijayanagara were almost a regular feature and lasted as long as these kingdoms continued. These military conflicts resulted in widespread devastation of the contested areas by both sides, resulting in considerable loss of life and property. Military slavery involved captured slaves from Vijayanagar and having them embrace a Deccani identity by converting them to Islam and integrating into the host society, so they could begin military careers within the Bahmanid empire. This was the origin of powerful political leaders such as Nizam-ul-Mulk Bahri.

=== Deccan Sultanates ===
The five Deccan Sultanates of diverse origins continued to identify as successor states of the Bahmanid dynasty as the basis of legitimacy, and minted Bahmanid coins rather than issue their own coins. The Nizam Shahs and Berar Shahs were founded by the heads of the Deccani Muslim party. The Adil Shahi Sultanate, which was founded by a Shia Georgian slave, also switched to a Deccani ethnic and political identity under Ibrahim Adil Shah I, who established Sunnism (the religion of the Deccani Muslims). He degraded the Afaqis (Persians) and dismissed them from their posts with a few exceptions, replacing them with nobles of the Deccani party. Uniting in a coalition under the leadership of Hussain Nizam Shah, the Nizam Shahi Sultan, the five Deccan Sultanates defeated the Hindu Vijayanagar Empire in the Battle of Talikota, resulting in the Sack of Vijayanagara. Hussain Nizam Shah personally beheaded the Vijayanagar Emperor, Rama Raya.

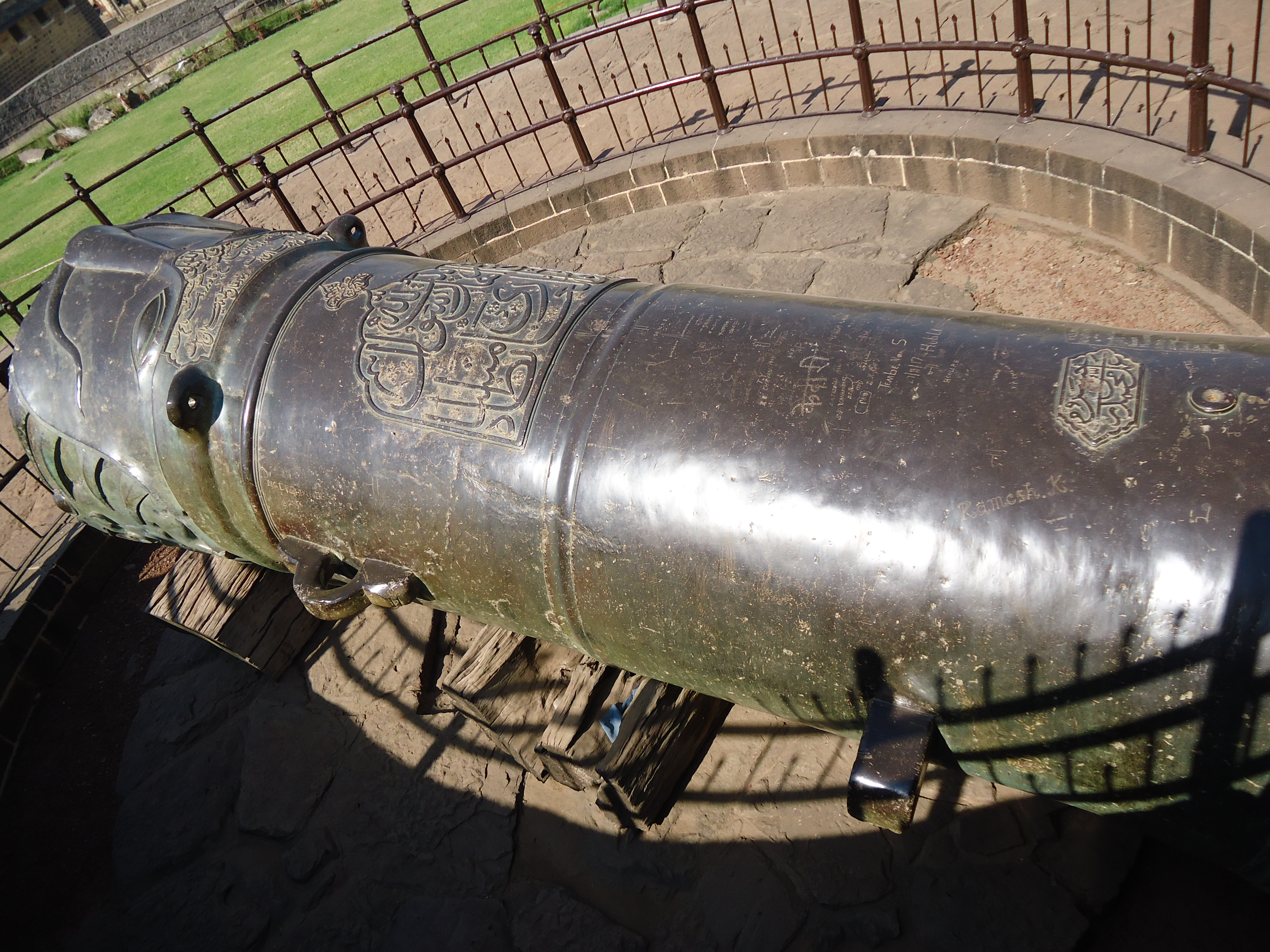
The Malik-i Maidan cannon

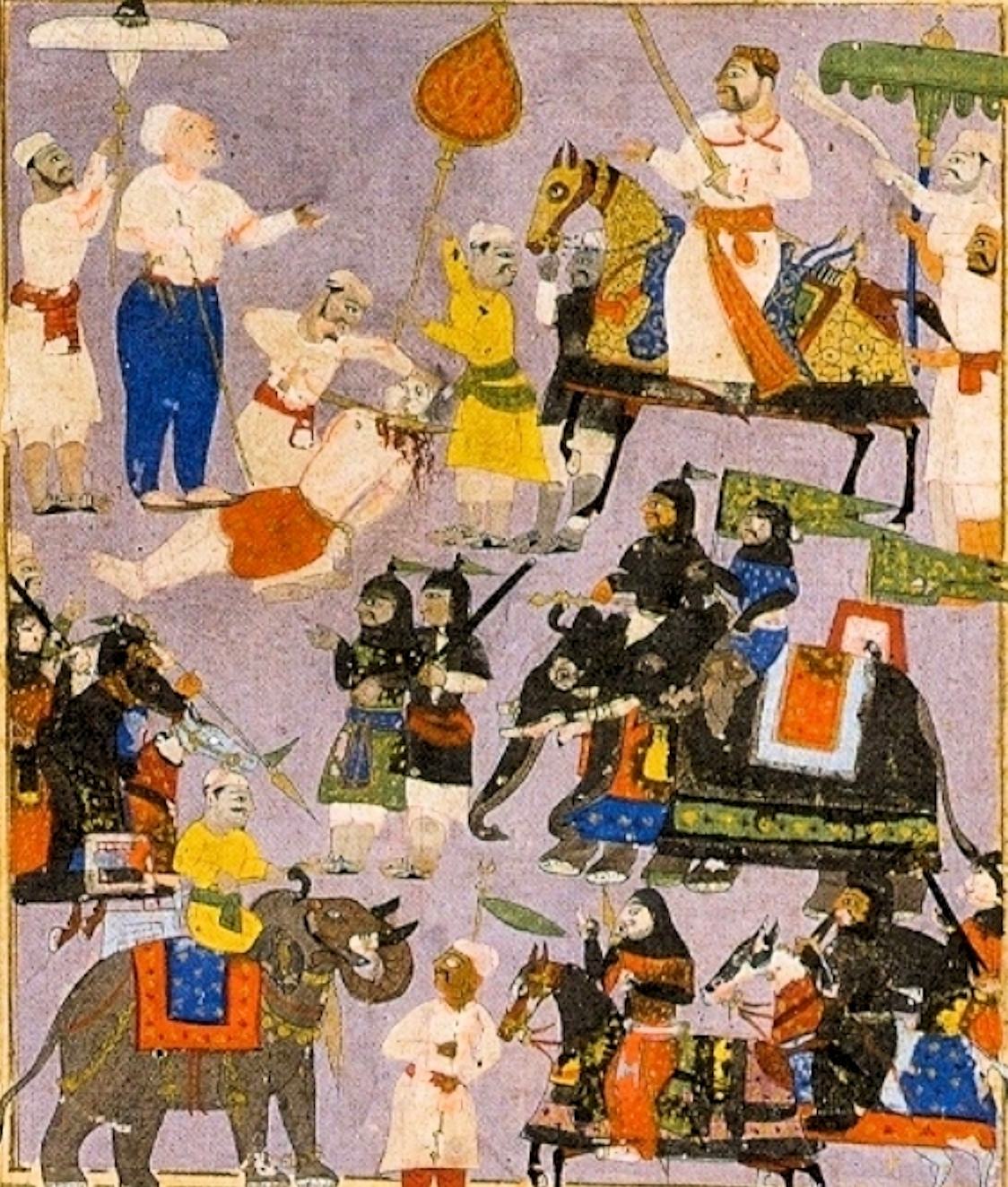
Sultan Hussain Nizam Shah I beheads Rama Raya

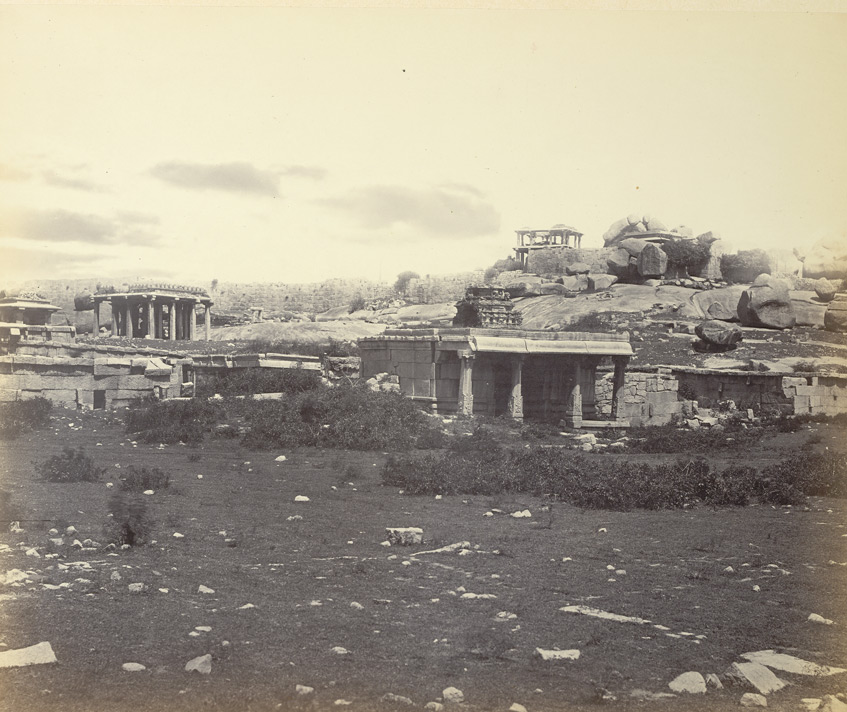
Ruins of Vijayanagar

=== Pindaris ===
The first mention of the Pindaris referred to Muslim mercenaries generally settled in the districts of Bijapur, who had served as mercenaries for the armies of most of the Muslim Deccani kingdoms. They took part in the numerous wars against the Mughals of Delhi. The disintegration of the Muslim kingdoms of the Deccan led to the gradual disbandment of the Pindaris. These were at that stage taken in the service of the Marathas. The inclusion of the Pindaris eventually became an indispensable part and parcel of the Maratha army. As a class of freebooters in Maratha armies they acted as a "sort of roving cavalry...rendering them much the same service as the Cossacks for the armies of Russia." The Pindaris would also later be used by kings such as Tipu Sultan.

=== 18th century ===
Muslim military men with Deccani background were much sought after by the Marava and Kallar warrior chiefs of the south Indian hinterland. Their fortress towns soon acquired concentrations of migrant Deccanis and Urdu-speaking service people, mostly Sunnis. These incomers included seasoned fighters who had seen service with the Mughals and the Muslim states in northern India. This was the source of the phenomenal rise of rulers such as Hyder Ali and Tipu Sultan.

==== Sultanat-i-Khudadad of Mysore ====
Hyder Ali had initially served as an ordinary soldier for the Hindu Wadiyar Kingdom of Mysore and became a cavalry officer in 1749. Once he took control of the army, he took advantage of court politics, stormed into Srirangapatna, and proclaimed himself ruler. Having styled himself as sultan in 1761, Hyder Ali launched a preemptive war against the Marathas, westernizing the army of Mysore in the process and developing the first successful iron-cased rockets as an artillery weapon. With the withdrawal of Madhav Rao, he overran the borderlands between the kingdoms and seized land and immense booty, increasing his power. Ultimately, this brought him into conflict with the East India Company, between whom a series of wars would begin. His son and successor Tipu Sultan would inherit both conflicts. He saw victory against the Marathas and allied with the French in order to fight the British and their allies. Eventually, after existing for 38 years, the Deccani Muslim Sultanat-e-Khudadad (transl. God-gifted kingdom) would be defeated by an alliance of the British, Hyderabad and the Marathas, and the Wadiyars were reinstated on the Mysori throne.

Territories of the original Wadeyar kingdom

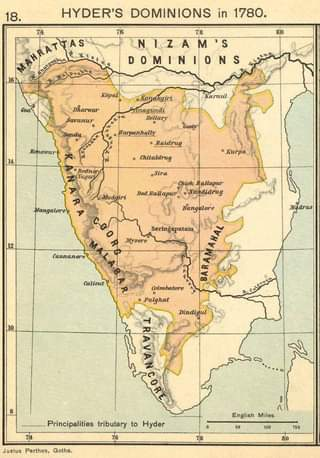
Hyder's Dominions in 1780

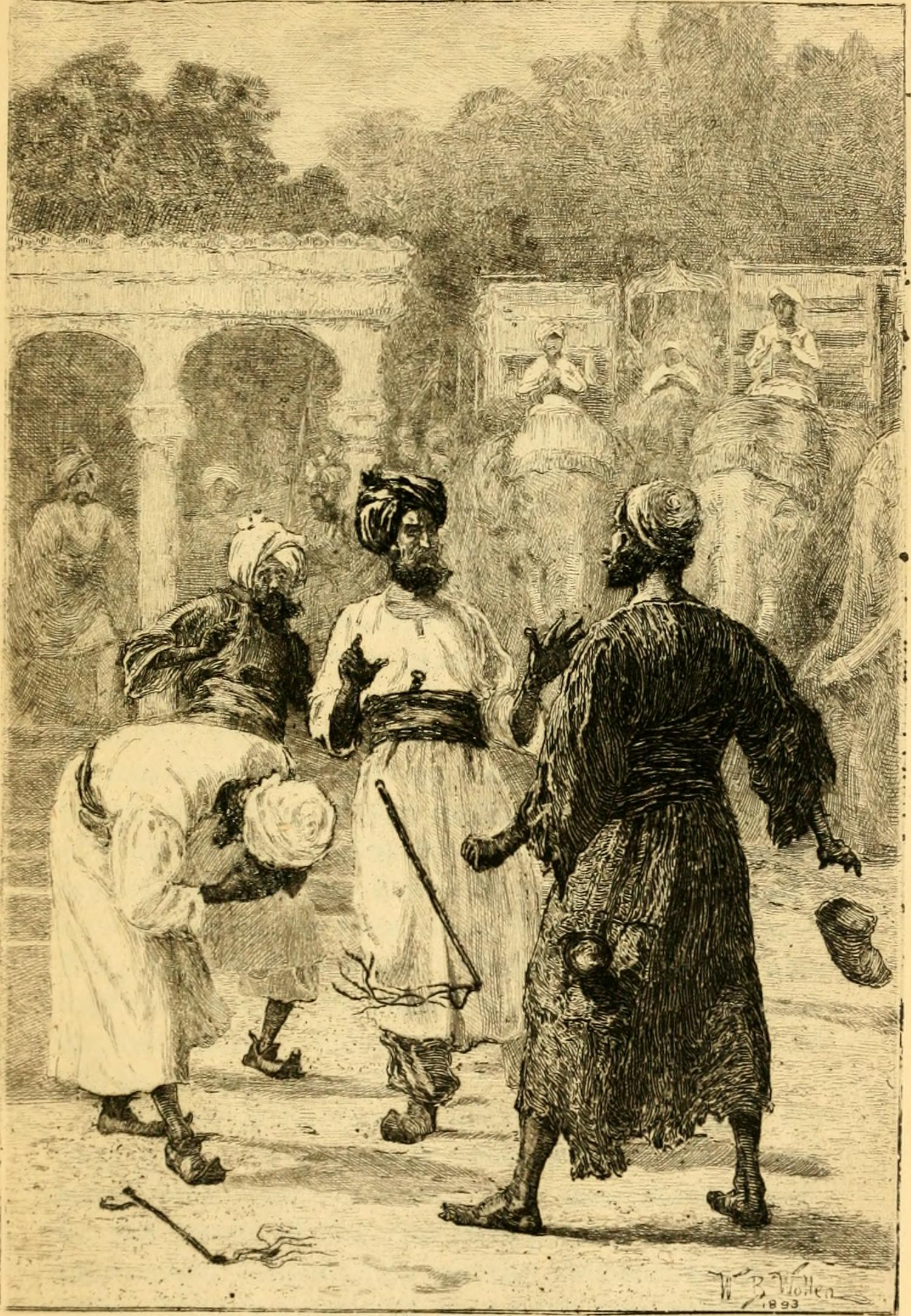
Hyder Ali as 'The Pretended Fakir'

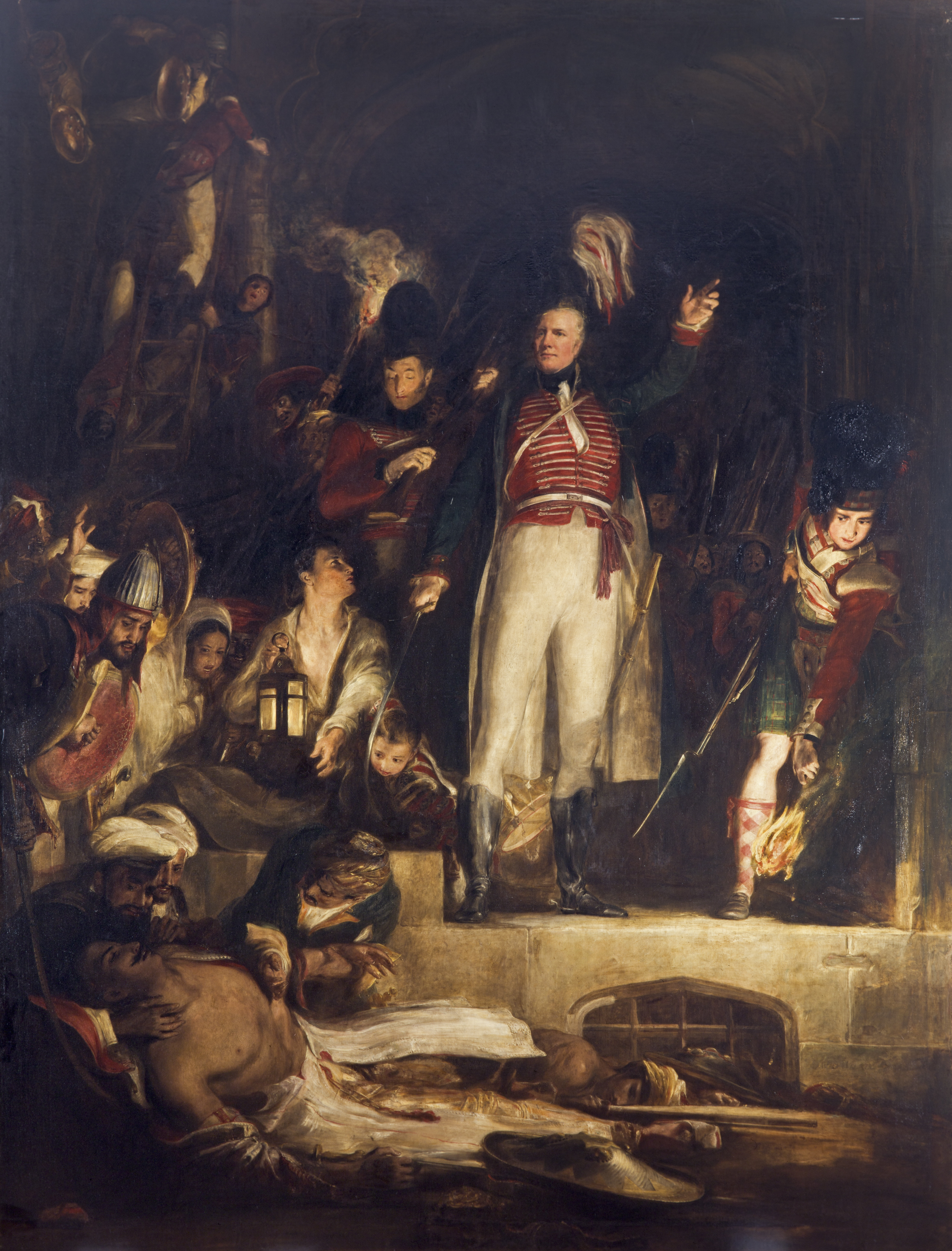
Sir David Baird Discovering Body of Tipu Sultan

== Culture ==
=== Painting ===
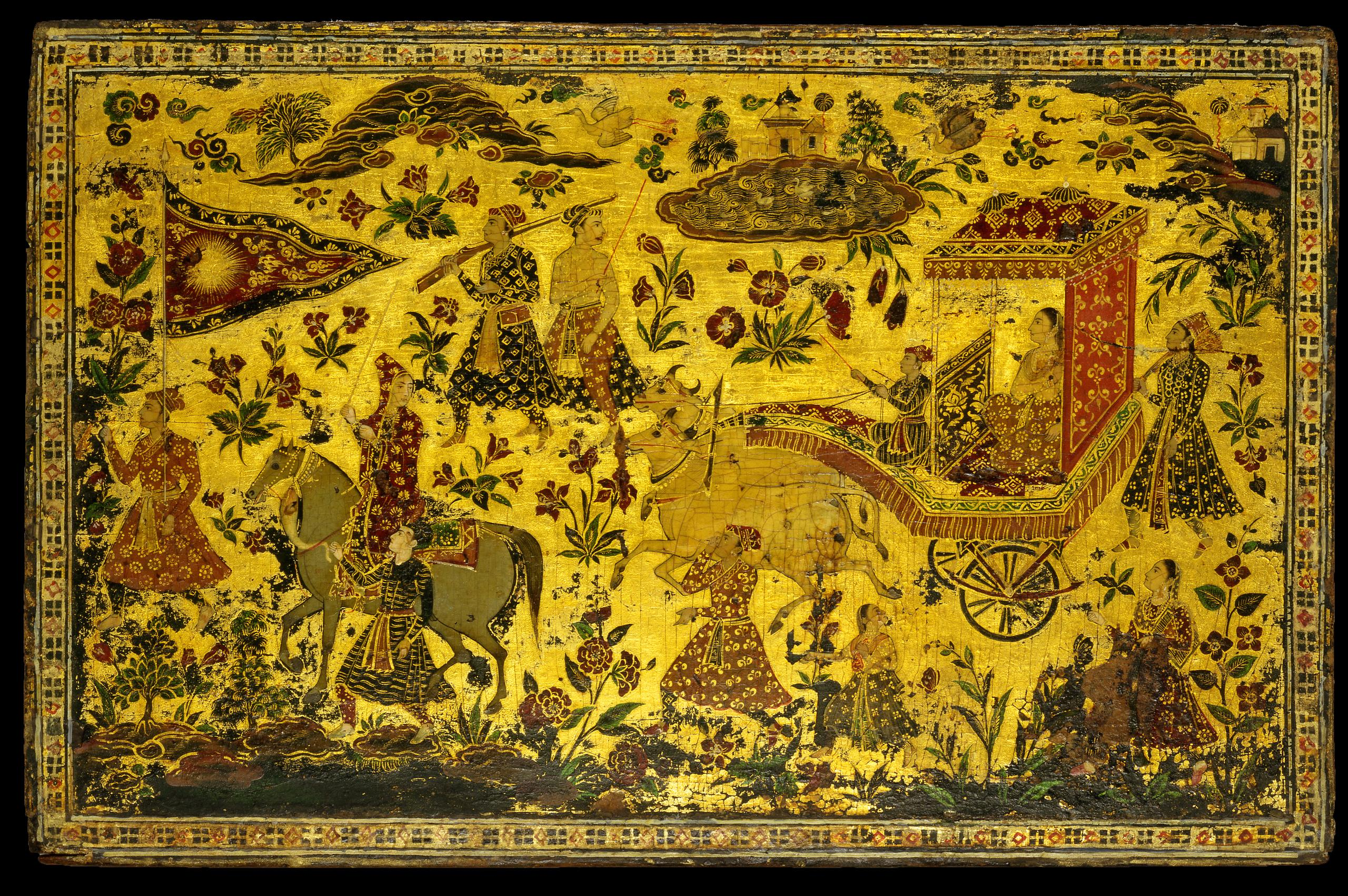
Hunting party, Deccan, 1st half of 17th century

Deccani style painting originated in the 16th century in the Deccan region, containing an insightful native style with the blend of Persianate techniques and is similar to neighbouring Vijayanagara paintings. Due to Islamic influence, Deccani paintings are mostly of nature and inspired by local floral and fauna. Some Deccani paintings present the historical events of the region.

=== Handicraft ===
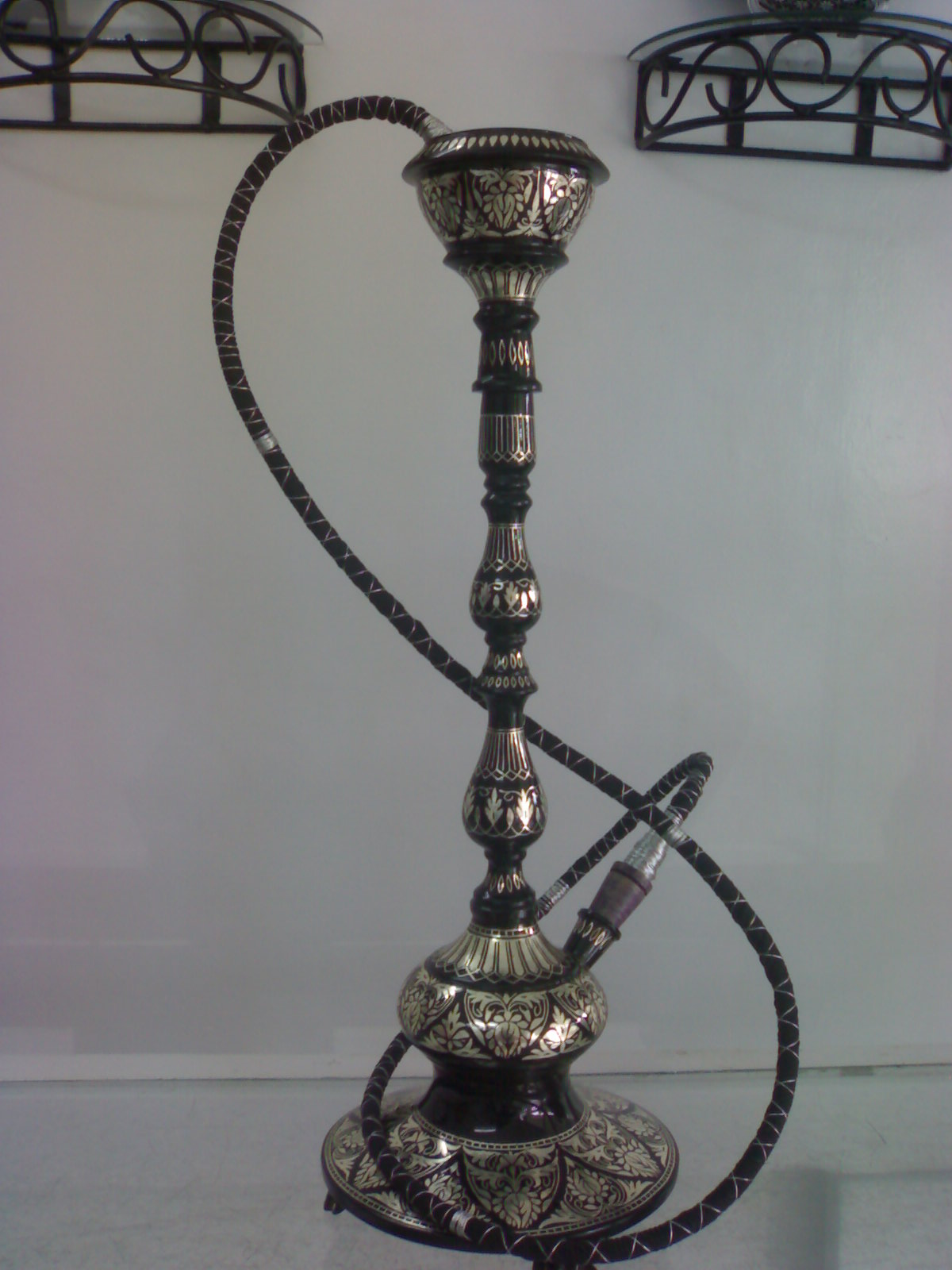
Bidriware Hookah

The craftspersons of Bidar were so famed for their inlay work on copper and silver that it came to be known as Bidri. It was developed in the 14th century C.E. during the rule of the Bahmani Sultans. The term "bidriware" originates from the township of Bidar, which is still the chief center of production. Bidriware is a Geographical Indication (GI) awarded craft of India.

== See also ==
- South Asian ethnic groups
- Dakhini
- Deccan Sultanates
- Hyderabadi Muslims
- Andhra Muslims
