= Fathullah Imad-ul-Mulk =

Sultan of Berar from 1490 to 1504

Fathullah Imad-ul-mulk
- Grand Vizer of Bahamani; Sultan of Berar
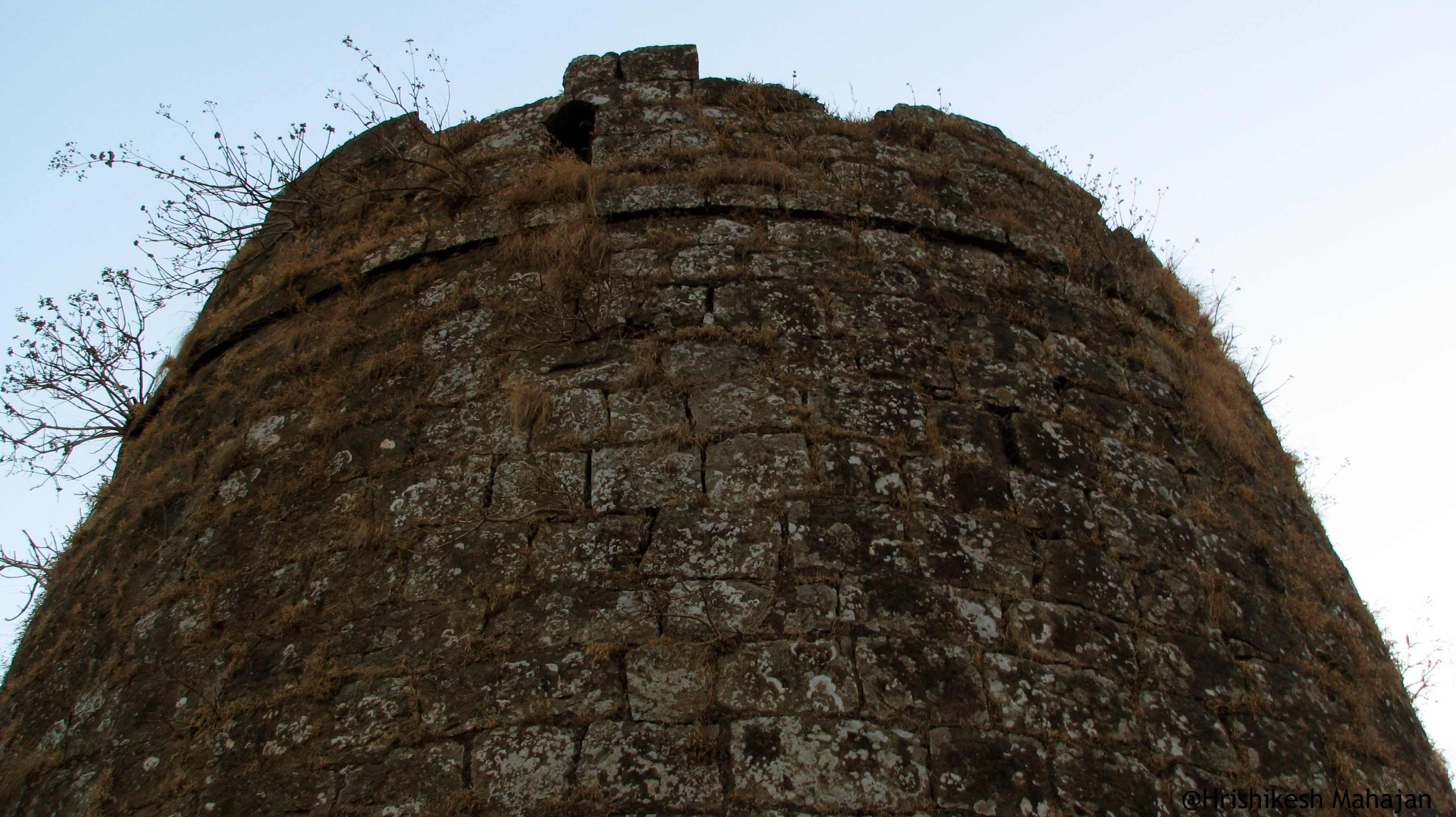
- The fort at Gawilghur, site of Fathullah's power under the Bahmani Sultanate

1st Sultan of Berar
- Reign: 1490 – 1504
- Predecessor: Position established (himself as Bahmani Governor of Berar)
- Successor: Aladdin Imad Shah
- Died: 1504; Achalpur
- Dynasty: Imad Shahi
- Religion: Islam, Hinduism (formerly)

Fathullah Imad-ul-Mulk (Persian: فتح الله عماد الملک, ruled 1490–1504) was the founder of the Imad Shahi Dynasty and the Berar Sultanate. Originally a Hindu captive from Vijayanagara, Fathullah was brought up as a Deccani Muslim and rose to command the army of Berar under the Bahmani Sultanate. In 1490, he declared himself Sultan of Berar, which he ruled until his death in 1504. He was succeeded by his son Aladdin Imad Shah.

== History ==
Fathullah was born a Kanarese Hindu of the Brahmin caste, but was captured as a boy by Bahmani forces on an expedition against the Vijayanagara Empire and brought up as a Muslim. He served the Bahmani Sultans in Bidar. Through the influence of Mahmud Gavan, he achieved the rank of officer in command of the forces (Sarlaskar) of Berar and received the title Imad-ul-mulk. He was stationed at the fort of Gawilghur, but extended his influence over the entire East Berar, becoming de facto ruler of the region.

Shortly after Malik Ahmad Nizam Shah I declared independence for the Ahmadnagar Sultanate in 1490, Fathullah Imad-ul-mulk declared himself Sultan of Berar. He set up his capital in Achalpur and proceeded to annex Mahur to his new kingdom. He also fortified Gavilgad and Narnala. He was succeeded by his eldest son Aladdin Imad Shah.

Preceded by n/a	Berar sultanate 1490-1504	Succeeded by Aladdin Imad Shah
