= Burhan Imad Shah =

Sultan of Berar from 1562 to 1574

Sultan of Berar
- Reign: 1562–1574
- Predecessor: Darya Imad Shah
- Successor: Tufail Khan
- Born: 1559
- Dynasty: Imad Shahi
- Father: Darya Imad Shah

Burhan Imad Shah (Persian: برهان عماد شاه), was an infant ruler of Berar from 1562 until his deposition in 1574.

== Biography ==
He was the son of Darya Imad Shah. His father died in 1562, and Burhan Imad Shah succeeded him to the throne. He was three years old.

He is known to have been one of the belligerents at the Battle of Talikota but was later overthrown by Tufail Khan. Shortly after the death of Tufail Khan, the Berar Sultanate came to an end and Berar was captured by the Ahmednagar Sultanate. The capital city of the sultanate, Amravati, came under direct control of the sultanate of Ahmednagar.

== See also ==
- Deccan sultanates
