= Darya Imad Shah =

Sultan of Berar from 1530 to 1561

3rd Sultan of Berar
- Reign: 1530 – 1561
- Predecessor: Aladdin Imad Shah
- Successor: Burhan Imad Shah
- Issue: Burhan Imad Shah; Daulat Shah Begum; Daughter
- Dynasty: Imad Shahi
- Father: Aladdin Imad Shah
- Religion: Islam

Darya Imad Shah (Persian: دریا عماد شاه) was the third Sultan of Berar. He reigned between 1530 and 1561.

Darya Imad Shah's attempts to rule peacefully meant dealing diplomatically with the local powers of Bijapur and Ahmadnagar. His daughter Daulat Shah Begum married the Ahmadnagar Sultan Hussain Nizam Shah I in 1558 on the banks of the Godavari River, and he came to the aid of his son-in-law against Aliya Rama Raya of the Vijayanagara Empire when he was subsequently attacked. This was an antecedent of the subsequent alliance between the Deccan Sultanates that fought in the Battle of Talikota. He died and was succeeded by his son, still an infant, in 1561.

== Issue ==
- Burhan Imad Shah, Sultan of the Berar Sultanate;
- Daulat Shah Begum, married Hussain Nizam Shah I, Sultan of Ahmednagar;
- Daughter, married Abdul Qadir, son of Burhan Nizam Shah I;

== See also ==
Ferishta, Mahomed Kasim (1829). History of the Rise of the Mahometan Power in India, till the year A.D. 1612. Translated by Briggs, John. London: Longman, Rees, Orme, Brown and Green.

Preceded by Aladdin Imad Shah	Berar sultanate 1530-1561	Succeeded by Burhan Imad Shah
