= Aladdin Imad Shah =

Sultan of Berar from 1504 to 1529

2nd Sultan of Berar
- Reign: 1504 – 1529
- Predecessor: Fathullah Imad-ul-Mulk
- Successor: Darya Imad Shah
- Spouse: Khadija Sultana
- Issue: Darya Imad Shah; Jafar Khan; Rabiya Sultana
- Dynasty: Imad Shahi
- Father: Fathullah Imad-ul-Mulk
- Religion: Sunni Islam

Aladdin Imad Shah (Persian: علاء الدین عماد شاه) was the second Sultan of Berar. He reigned between 1504 and 1529.

== Family ==
In 1528, Aladdin Imad Shah married Khadija Sultana, the sister of Ismail Adil Shah. He had at least two children:

- Darya Imad Shah, Sultan of Berar;
- Rabiya Sultana, married Ibrahim Adil Shah I, Sultan of Bijapur;

Preceded by Fathullah Imad-ul-Mulk	Berar sultanate 1504-1529	Succeeded by Darya Imad Shah
