= Berar Sultanate =

Indian kingdom in the Deccan (1490–1574)

Berar Sultanate عمادشاهیان वऱ्हाड
- 1490–1574
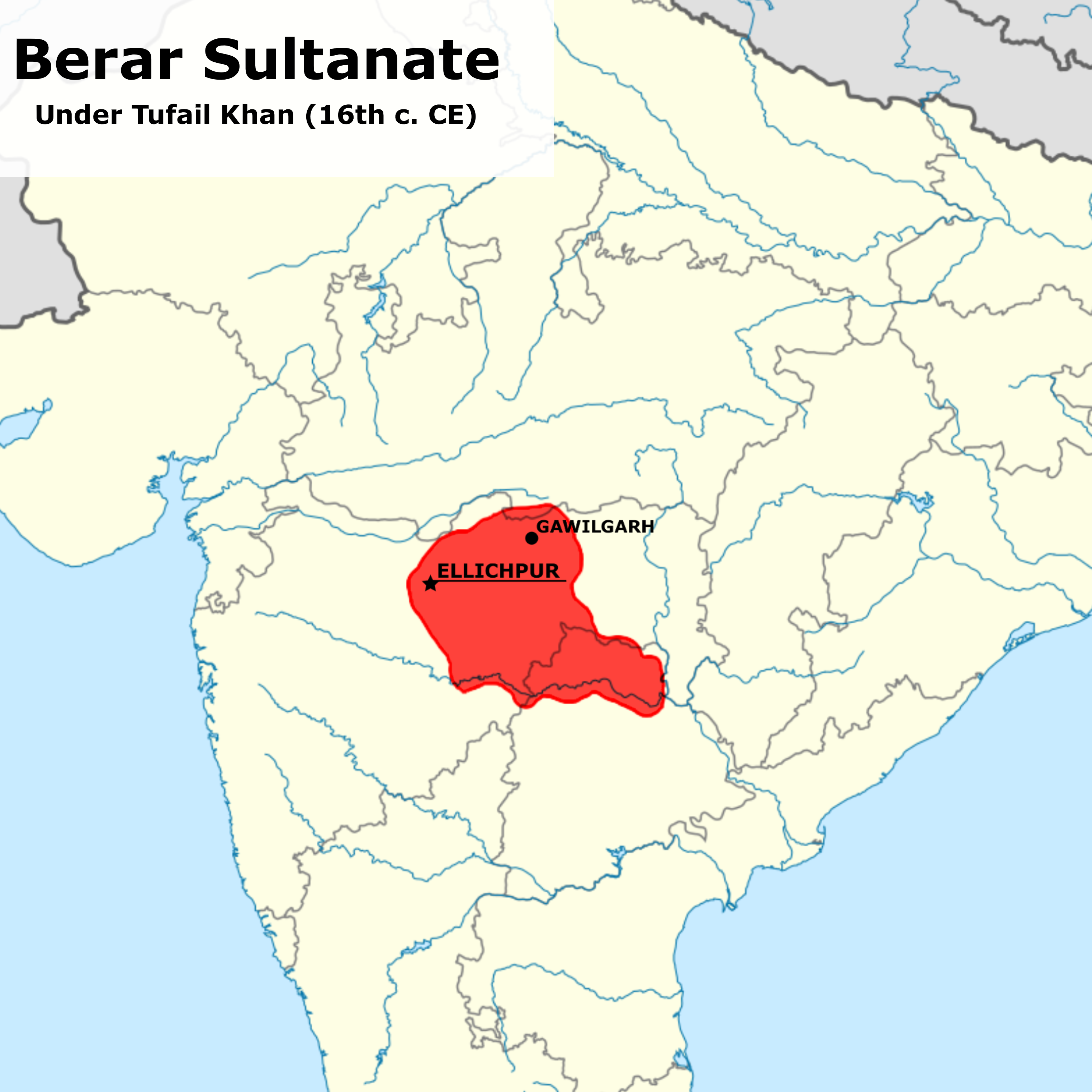
- Berar Sultanate at its Peak under Tufail Khan before being annexed by Ahmednagar Sultanate
- Capital: Ellichpur
- Common languages: Persian, Marathi, Dakhini
- Religion: State religion: Sunni Islam Other: Other religions in South Asia
- Government: Monarchy
- Sultan
  - 1490 – 1504: Fathullah Imad-ul-Mulk (first)
  - 1568 – 1574: Tufail Khan (last)
- History
  - Independence: 1490
  - Conquered by the Ahmednagar Sultanate: 1574

Area
- 29,340 km^{2} (11,330 sq mi)
Preceded by	Succeeded by
Bahmani Sultanate	Ahmadnagar Sultanate
- Today part of: India
- This article incorporates text from a publication now in the public domain: Chisholm, Hugh, ed. (1911). "Berar". Encyclopædia Britannica (11th ed.). Cambridge University Press.

The Berar Sultanate (Note: Marathi: वऱ्हाड, romanized: Varhāḍ) was an early modern sultanate located in the Deccan, ruled by the Imad Shahi dynasty. (Note: Persian: عمادشاهیان, romanized: ʿImād-Šāhiyān) One of the five Deccan sultanates, it was established in 1490 following the disintegration of the Bahmani Sultanate by Fathullah Imad-ul-Mulk, who was of Kanarese origin. It was annexed by the Ahmadnagar Sultanate in 1574 following an invasion.

== History ==
On the establishment of the Bahmani Sultanate in the Deccan in 1347, Berar was constituted as one of the five provinces into which the kingdom was divided, being governed by a tarafdar, with a separate army. The perils of this system became apparent when the province was divided (1478 or 1479) into two separate provinces, named after their capitals Gawil and Mahur.

In 1490, Fathullah Imad-ul-Mulk, who had been appointed governor of Berar by Mahmud Gawan after assisting him in his campaigns, proclaimed his independence amidst the civil unrest in the Bahmani Sultanate and founded the Imad Shahi dynasty of Berar. He proceeded to annex Mahur to his new kingdom and had its capital at Ellichpur. Imad-ul-Mulk was by birth a Kanarese Hindu, but had been captured as a boy in one of the expeditions against the Vijayanagara Empire and brought up as a Muslim. Gavilgad and Narnala were also fortified by him.

Fathullah Imad-ul-Mulk died in 150,4 and his successor, Aladdin Imad Shah, resisted the aggression of Ahmadnagar with the help of Bahadur Shah, sultan of Gujarat. The next ruler, Darya, ascended the throne in 1530 and tried to align with Bijapur to prevent aggression from Ahmadnagar, but was unsuccessful. Early in his reign, the minor Burhan Imad Shah, who succeeded his father in 1562, was deposed by his minister and regent Tufail Khan, who assumed rule of the Sultanate. This gave a pretext for the intervention of Murtaza Nizam Shah I of Ahmadnagar, who invaded Berar, imprisoned and put to death Tufail Khan, his son Shams-ul-Mulk, and the former king Burhan, and proceeded to annex Berar into his own dominions of the Ahmadnagar Sultanate in 1574.

== List of rulers ==
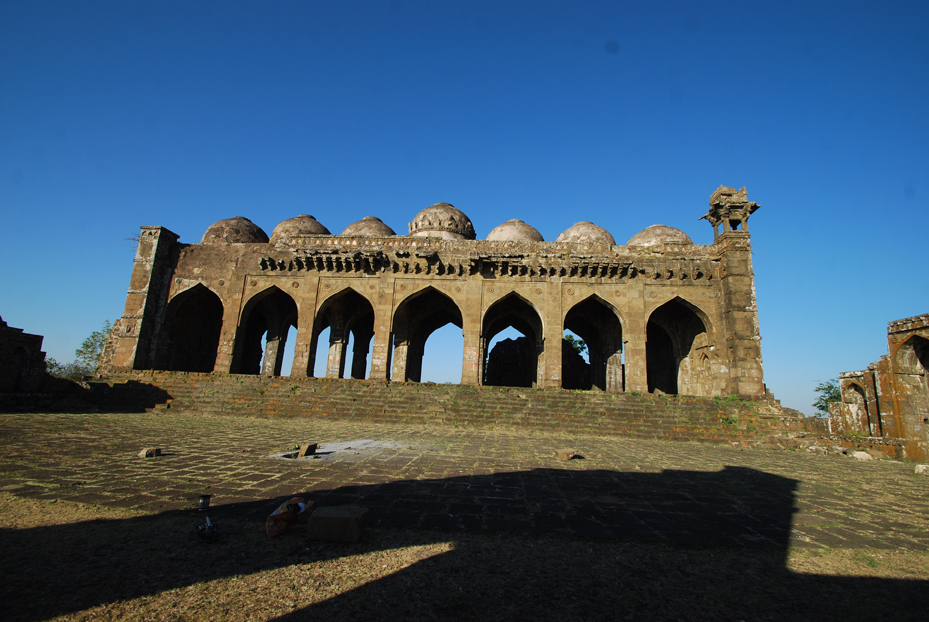
Gavilgad Fort, built by Fathullah Imad-ul-Mulk of Berar (1490 – 1504).

The sultans of Berar belonged to the Imad Shahi dynasty:

1. Fathullah Imad-ul-Mulk: 1490 – 1504
2. Aladdin Imad Shah: 1504 – 1529
3. Darya Imad Shah: 1529 – 1562.
4. Burhan Imad Shah: 1562 – 1574 (de facto 1562 – 1568)
5. Tufail Khan (usurper): 1568 – 1574

== See also ==
- Berar Subah
- Berar Province
- Battle of Talikota
