= List of monuments of national importance in Mumbai circle =

The ASI has recognized 286 Monuments of National Importance in Maharashtra. This list of has been split into three lists:

- List of Monuments of National Importance in Aurangabad circle
- List of monuments of national importance in Mumbai circle
- List of Monuments of National Importance in Nagpur circle

This is a list of Monuments of National Importance as officially recognized by the Archaeological Survey of India (ASI) in the Indian state of Maharashtra falling under the jurisdiction of its Mumbai (ASI circle).

SL. No.	Description	Location	Address	District	Coordinates	Image
N-MH-M1	Kopeshwar Temple	Khidrapur		Kolhapur	16°36′57″N 74°41′08″E	Kopeshwar Temple More images
N-MH-M2	Ancient site at Brahamapuri	Kolhapur		Kolhapur	16°42′16″N 74°13′06″E	Upload Photo
N-MH-M3	Panhala Fort i. Ambarkhana, ii. Andhra Vav, iii. Dharma Kopthi, iv. Naikinicha Sajja, v. Teen Darwaja, vi. Wagh Darwaja, vii. Tatbandi together with bastions	Panhala		Kolhapur	16°48′41″N 74°06′28″E	Panhala Fort i. Ambarkhana, ii. Andhra Vav, iii. Dharma Kopthi, iv. Naikinicha Sajja, v. Teen Darwaja, vi. Wagh Darwaja, vii. Tatbandi together with bastions More images
N-MH-M3-a	Panhala Fort: i. Ambarkhana	Panhala		Kolhapur	16°48′33″N 74°06′33″E	Panhala Fort: i. Ambarkhana More images
N-MH-M3-b	Panhala Fort: ii. Andhra Vav	Panhala		Kolhapur	16°48′24″N 74°06′27″E	Panhala Fort: ii. Andhra Vav More images
N-MH-M3-c	Panhala Fort: iii. Dharma Kothi / Sajja Kothi	Panhala		Kolhapur	16°48′49″N 74°06′46″E	Panhala Fort: iii. Dharma Kothi / Sajja Kothi More images
N-MH-M3-d	Panhala Fort: iv. Naikinicha Sajja	Panhala		Kolhapur	16°48′29″N 74°06′48″E	Panhala Fort: iv. Naikinicha Sajja More images
N-MH-M3-e	Panhala Fort: v. Teen Darwaja	Panhala		Kolhapur	16°48′26″N 74°06′25″E	Panhala Fort: v. Teen Darwaja More images
N-MH-M3-f	Panhala Fort: vi. Wagh Darwaja	Panhala		Kolhapur	16°48′51″N 74°06′39″E	Panhala Fort: vi. Wagh Darwaja More images
N-MH-M3-g	Panhala Fort: vii. Tatbandi together with bastions	Panhala		Kolhapur	16°48′32″N 74°06′33″E	Panhala Fort: vii. Tatbandi together with bastions More images
N-MH-M4	Buddhist Caves	Pohala		Kolhapur	16°47′27″N 74°11′28″E	Buddhist Caves More images
N-MH-M5	Monolithic bas relief depicting seven manifestations of Siva locally known as Baradeva Parel Relief	Parel village		Mumbai	19°00′02″N 72°50′51″E	Monolithic bas relief depicting seven manifestations of Siva locally known as Baradeva Parel Relief More images
N-MH-M6	Whole hill fort of Sion together with all ancient Portuguese remains of buildings situated to the north, east and south-east sides of the hill at its toe	Sion		Mumbai	19°02′48″N 72°52′03″E	Whole hill fort of Sion together with all ancient Portuguese remains of buildings situated to the north, east and south-east sides of the hill at its toe More images
N-MH-M7	The Buddhist Caves	Kaneri		Mumbai Suburban	19°12′28″N 72°54′17″E	The Buddhist Caves More images
N-MH-M8	Kondivate/Mahakali Caves	Kondiote		Mumbai Suburban	19°07′48″N 72°52′23″E	Kondivate/Mahakali Caves More images
N-MH-M9	Jogeshwari Caves	Majas		Mumbai Suburban	19°08′21″N 72°51′24″E	Jogeshwari Caves More images
N-MH-M10	Old Portuguese Churches, Watch Tower and Caves	Mandapeshwar		Mumbai Suburban	19°14′41″N 72°51′12″E	Old Portuguese Churches, Watch Tower and Caves More images
N-MH-M11	Caves	Mandapeshwar		Mumbai Suburban	19°14′42″N 72°51′13″E	Caves More images
N-MH-M12	The Portuguese monastery over the caves and large watch tower on the adjoining hill at Mandapeshwar	Mandapeshwar		Mumbai Suburban	19°14′43″N 72°51′12″E	The Portuguese monastery over the caves and large watch tower on the adjoining hill at Mandapeshwar
N-MH-M13	Arnala Fort	Arnala		Palghar	19°27′57″N 72°43′56″E	Arnala Fort More images
N-MH-M14	Fort and Portuguese remains - Bassein Fort also known as Vasai Fort	Bassein		Palghar	19°19′49″N 72°48′54″E	Fort and Portuguese remains - Bassein Fort also known as Vasai Fort More images
N-MH-M15	Tank by the west side of the road from Umarale village to Bolinj	Bolinj		Palghar	19°25′58″N 72°47′48″E	Upload Photo
N-MH-M16	Mound locally known as "Sonar Bhat" in Hissa No.11 of the Survey No. 52 having an area of 25 1/4 gunthas	Gas		Palghar	19°24′32″N 72°48′16″E	Upload Photo
N-MH-M17	Caves on Burud Hill Bahrot Caves	Khunavada		Palghar	20°04′08″N 72°49′25″E	Upload Photo
N-MH-18	A mound locally known as Burud Raja cha Kot Nallasopara	Mardes (Nalasopara)		Palghar	19°24′51″N 72°47′43″E	A mound locally known as Burud Raja cha Kot Nallasopara More images
N-MH-19	Brahmanical Caves (Ganapati Gadad Caves)	Polu Sonala		Palghar	19°14′14″N 73°39′00″E	Upload Photo
N-MH-M20	Carved Stones	Vada		Palghar	19°39′07″N 73°08′35″E	Upload Photo
N-MH-M21	Small Dargah near Habsi Gumaz (near Junnar)	Agar		Pune	19°11′47″N 73°53′52″E	Upload Photo
N-MH-M22	Cave Temples and Inscriptions (Bedse Caves)	Bedsa		Pune	18°43′17″N 73°32′06″E	Cave Temples and Inscriptions (Bedse Caves) More images
N-MH-M23	Cave temples and Inscriptions (Bhaja Caves)	Bhaja		Pune	18°43′42″N 73°28′54″E	Cave temples and Inscriptions (Bhaja Caves) More images
N-MH-M24	Caves and inscription at the Nana Pass (Naneghat)	Ghatghar		Pune	19°17′32″N 73°40′30″E	Caves and inscription at the Nana Pass (Naneghat) More images
N-MH-M25	Caves, Temple and Inscription (also known as Lenyadri)	Junnar		Pune	19°14′36″N 73°53′15″E	Caves, Temple and Inscription (also known as Lenyadri) More images
N-MH-M26	Fort of Shivneri	Junnar		Pune	19°11′35″N 73°51′20″E	Fort of Shivneri More images
N-MH-M27	Habsi Gumbaz	Junnar		Pune	19°11′46″N 73°53′55″E	Habsi Gumbaz More images
N-MH-M28	Cave Temples and inscriptions (Karla Caves)	Karla		Pune	18°47′00″N 73°28′14″E	Cave Temples and inscriptions (Karla Caves) More images
N-MH-M29	Ancient dam with lock and sluice gates	Rajgurunagar		Pune		Upload Photo
N-MH-M30	Dilawar Khan's Masjid	Rajgurunagar		Pune	18°51′18″N 73°53′04″E	Dilawar Khan's Masjid More images
N-MH-M31	Dilawar Khan's Tomb	Rajgurunagar		Pune	18°51′18″N 73°53′06″E	Dilawar Khan's Tomb More images
N-MH-M32	Fort	Lohogad		Pune	18°42′36″N 73°28′36″E	Fort More images
N-MH-M33	Bhuleshwar Mahadeo Temple	Malsiras		Pune	18°26′09″N 74°14′28″E	Bhuleshwar Mahadeo Temple More images
N-MH-M34	Aga Khan Palace Building	Pune		Pune	18°33′08″N 73°54′05″E	Aga Khan Palace Building More images
N-MH-M35	The Cave Temple of Bhamburda (known as Pataleshwar caves)	Pune		Pune	18°31′37″N 73°51′00″E	The Cave Temple of Bhamburda (known as Pataleshwar caves) More images
N-MH-M36	Old Citadel known as Shaniwar Wada	Pune		Pune	18°31′09″N 73°51′20″E	Old Citadel known as Shaniwar Wada More images
N-MH-M37	Old European Tombs	Pune		Pune	18°31′20″N 73°52′20″E	Old European Tombs More images
N-MH-M38	Fort	Rajmachi		Pune	18°49′53″N 73°23′43″E	Fort More images
N-MH-M39	Excavations & Inscriptions (Ghoradeshwar Caves)	Shelarwadi		Pune	18°41′33″N 73°42′14″E	Excavations & Inscriptions (Ghoradeshwar Caves) More images
N-MH-M40	Fort	Visapur		Pune	18°43′21″N 73°29′24″E	Fort More images
N-MH-M41	Songad	Achloli		Raigad	18°05′53″N 73°23′21″E	Upload Photo
N-MH-M42	Cathedral	Agarkot		Raigad	18°33′23″N 72°56′18″E	Upload Photo
N-MH-M43	Chouburji-the castle or factory of Cheul	Agarkot		Raigad	18°32′50″N 72°55′44″E	Upload Photo
N-MH-M44	Church & Convent of the Augustinians	Agarkot		Raigad	18°32′54″N 72°55′37″E	Upload Photo
N-MH-M45	The Dominican Church & Convent	Agarkot		Raigad	18°32′45″N 72°55′31″E	Upload Photo
N-MH-M46	The Jesuit Monastery	Agarkot		Raigad	18°32′55″N 72°55′41″E	Upload Photo
N-MH-M47	Kothi	Agarkot		Raigad		Kothi
N-MH-M48	1 Buruj	Agarkot		Raigad	18°33′23″N 72°56′18″E	1 Buruj
N-MH-M49	St. Francis Xavier's Chapel	Agarkot		Raigad	18°32′44″N 72°55′41″E	Upload Photo
N-MH-M50	Satkhani Buruj-St. Barbara's Tower	Agarkot		Raigad	18°32′48″N 72°55′29″E	Satkhani Buruj-St. Barbara's Tower More images
N-MH-M51	Two Gates-Porta do Mar & Porta da Terra	Agarkot		Raigad	18°32′43″N 72°55′44″E	Upload Photo
N-MH-M52	Hirakote old Fort	Alibag		Raigad	18°38′54″N 72°52′09″E	Hirakote old Fort More images
N-MH-M53	Kolaba Fort Containing i) Sarja Kot, ii) The North Causeway, iii) The Manik Chawda, iv) The South causeway, v) The Talghar, vi) The Padmawati Shrine, vii) The Temple of Gulbai or Mahishasuri, viii) The Shrine of Bhawani, ix) The Nanisahib's Palace, x) The Thorla wada, xi) The Reservoir Apsaras, xii) The Temple of Ganpati-Panchyatan, xiii) The Temple of Mahadeo, xiv) The Shrine of Maruti, xv) The Temple of Kanhoba, xvi) The Shrine of Yeshvantdari, xvii) The Tomb of a Mahomedan saint, xviii) The Temple of Bapdeo	Agarkot		Raigad	18°38′04″N 72°51′51″E	Kolaba Fort Containing i) Sarja Kot, ii) The North Causeway, iii) The Manik Chawda, iv) The South causeway, v) The Talghar, vi) The Padmawati Shrine, vii) The Temple of Gulbai or Mahishasuri, viii) The Shrine of Bhawani, ix) The Nanisahib's Palace, x) The Thorla wada, xi) The Reservoir Apsaras, xii) The Temple of Ganpati-Panchyatan, xiii) The Temple of Mahadeo, xiv) The Shrine of Maruti, xv) The Temple of Kanhoba, xvi) The Shrine of Yeshvantdari, xvii) The Tomb of a Mahomedan saint, xviii) The Temple of Bapdeo More images
N-MH-M53-a	Kolaba Fort: i) Sarja Kot	Agarkot		Raigad	18°38′16″N 72°51′56″E	Kolaba Fort: i) Sarja Kot
N-MH-M53-b	Kolaba Fort Containing: ii) The North Causeway	Agarkot		Raigad	18°38′11″N 72°51′53″E	Kolaba Fort Containing: ii) The North Causeway
N-MH-M53-c	Kolaba Fort: iii) The Manik Chawda	Agarkot		Raigad	18°38′10″N 72°51′53″E	Upload Photo
N-MH-M53-d	Kolaba Fort: iv) The South causeway	Agarkot		Raigad	18°38′09″N 72°51′53″E	Upload Photo
N-MH-M53-e	Kolaba Fort: v) The Talghar	Agarkot		Raigad	18°38′07″N 72°51′52″E	Upload Photo
N-MH-M53-f	Kolaba Fort: vi) The Padmawati Shrine	Agarkot		Raigad	18°38′07″N 72°51′51″E	Upload Photo
N-MH-M53-g	Kolaba Fort: vii) The Temple of Gulbai or Mahishasuri	Agarkot		Raigad	18°38′07″N 72°51′51″E	Upload Photo
N-MH-M53-h	Kolaba Fort: viii) The Shrine of Bhawani	Agarkot		Raigad	18°38′06″N 72°51′52″E	Upload Photo
N-MH-M53-i	Kolaba Fort: ix) The Nanisahib's Palace	Agarkot		Raigad	18°38′06″N 72°51′51″E	Upload Photo
N-MH-M53-j	Kolaba Fort: x) The Thorla wada	Agarkot		Raigad	18°38′04″N 72°51′51″E	Upload Photo
N-MH-M53-k	Kolaba Fort: xi) The Reservoir Apsaras	Agarkot		Raigad	18°38′02″N 72°51′52″E	Kolaba Fort: xi) The Reservoir Apsaras
N-MH-M53-l	Kolaba Fort: xii) The Temple of Ganpati-Panchyatan	Agarkot		Raigad	18°38′02″N 72°51′51″E	Kolaba Fort: xii) The Temple of Ganpati-Panchyatan More images
N-MH-M53-m	Kolaba Fort: xiii) The Temple of Mahadeo	Agarkot		Raigad	18°38′02″N 72°51′51″E	Upload Photo
N-MH-M53-n	Kolaba Fort: xiv) The Shrine of Maruti	Agarkot		Raigad	18°37′58″N 72°51′50″E	Upload Photo
N-MH-M53-o	Kolaba Fort: xv) The Temple of Kanhoba	Agarkot		Raigad	18°38′04″N 72°51′51″E	Upload Photo
N-MH-M53-p	Kolaba Fort: xvi) The Shrine of Yeshvantdari	Agarkot		Raigad	18°38′00″N 72°51′51″E	Upload Photo
N-MH-M53-q	Kolaba Fort: xvii) The Tomb of a Mahomedan saint	Agarkot		Raigad	18°38′04″N 72°51′51″E	Upload Photo
N-MH-M53-r	Kolaba Fort: xviii) The Temple of Bapdeo	Agarkot		Raigad	18°38′04″N 72°51′51″E	Upload Photo
N-MH-M54	Caves	Ambivli		Raigad	19°01′08″N 73°29′50″E	Caves
N-MH-M55	Birwadi fort on a broken range of varying 1700 to 900 feet in height	Birwadi		Raigad	18°25′27″N 73°02′29″E	Birwadi fort on a broken range of varying 1700 to 900 feet in height More images
N-MH-M56	Barber's Mahal	Cheul		Raigad		Upload Photo
N-MH-M57	Dadar (Stair Case)	Cheul		Raigad		Upload Photo
N-MH-M58	Kaman (Arch)	Cheul		Raigad		Upload Photo
N-MH-M59	Mosque	Cheul		Raigad	18°33′08″N 72°56′20″E	Upload Photo
N-MH-M60	Rajkot	Cheul		Raigad	18°33′11″N 72°56′18″E	Upload Photo
N-MH-M61	Tomb of Angre	Cheul		Raigad	18°33′51″N 72°55′38″E	Upload Photo
N-MH-M62	Vada of Dancing Girls	Cheul		Raigad	18°34′42″N 72°57′16″E	Upload Photo
N-MH-M63	Chandragad	Dhavala		Raigad	18°00′05″N 73°37′10″E	Upload Photo
N-MH-M64	Elephanta Caves	Gharapuri		Raigad	18°57′48″N 72°55′53″E	Elephanta Caves More images
N-MH-M65	Ancient Brick stupa at Elephanta Island.	Gharapuri		Raigad	18°57′59″N 72°56′15″E	Upload Photo
N-MH-M66	Gheragad or Surgad	Ghera Surgad		Raigad	18°27′18″N 73°13′35″E	Gheragad or Surgad More images
N-MH-M67	Ghosalgad Fort	Ghosale		Raigad	18°21′53″N 73°05′27″E	Ghosalgad Fort More images
N-MH-M68	Buddhist Caves	Gomashi		Raigad	18°27′57″N 73°17′53″E	Upload Photo
N-MH-M69	Old Fort containing a temple of the God Kangormel & Two tanks	Kadasari Kangori		Raigad	18°03′00″N 73°34′54″E	Upload Photo
N-MH-M70	A precipitious hill near Raigad Fort containing one rock-cut cistern of water. It was formerly used as a Jail for prisoners.	Kadasari Lingana		Raigad	18°15′12″N 73°30′09″E	Upload Photo
N-MH-M71	Caves	Kol		Raigad	18°03′58″N 73°25′47″E	Upload Photo
N-MH-M72	Caves situated in Survey No.86 & No. 49 of the Village of Kol	Kol		Raigad	18°03′17″N 73°25′57″E	Upload Photo
N-MH-M73	Caves	Kondhane		Raigad	18°50′22″N 73°23′02″E	Caves More images
N-MH-M74	Old Fort	Korlai		Raigad	18°32′11″N 72°54′29″E	Old Fort More images
N-MH-M75	Caves	Kuda		Raigad	18°17′08″N 73°04′22″E	Caves More images
N-MH-M76	Awchitgad	Medhe		Raigad	18°28′30″N 73°07′06″E	Awchitgad More images
N-MH-M77	Kasa (Kamsa) Fort also known as Murud Fort	Murud		Raigad	18°19′20″N 72°55′58″E	Kasa (Kamsa) Fort also known as Murud Fort More images
N-MH-M78	Thanala Caves	Nadsur		Raigad	18°34′07″N 73°19′09″E	Thanala Caves More images
N-MH-M79	Nagothana Bridge	Nagothana		Raigad	18°32′20″N 73°08′00″E	Nagothana Bridge More images
N-MH-M80	Khadsamla Caves	Nenawali		Raigad	18°30′37″N 73°20′39″E	Upload Photo
N-MH-M81	Jijamata's Samadhi consisting of four towers.	Pachad		Raigad	18°14′38″N 73°24′53″E	Jijamata's Samadhi consisting of four towers. More images
N-MH-M82	Jijamata's Wada comprising four dilapidated houses & three wells surrounded by a stone wall	Pachad		Raigad	18°14′12″N 73°25′02″E	Upload Photo
N-MH-M84	Caves	Pala		Raigad	18°05′13″N 73°24′15″E	Caves More images
N-MH-M84	Caves Near the Kotali Fort	Peth		Raigad	18°59′32″N 73°30′46″E	Caves Near the Kotali Fort More images
N-MH-M85	Kotali Fort with two iron guns and one bronze gun	Peth		Raigad	18°59′31″N 73°30′47″E	Kotali Fort with two iron guns and one bronze gun More images
N-MH-M86	Raigad Fort	Raigad		Raigad	18°14′01″N 73°26′26″E	Raigad Fort More images
N-MH-M87	Janjira Fort	Rajapuri		Raigad	18°18′00″N 72°57′52″E	Janjira Fort More images
N-MH-M88	Tombs at Khokari Najik Ghumaj (Khokari Ghumaj)	Rajapuri		Raigad	18°18′06″N 72°58′52″E	Tombs at Khokari Najik Ghumaj (Khokari Ghumaj) More images
N-MH-M89	Tala Fort	Tala		Raigad	18°17′32″N 73°08′10″E	Tala Fort More images
N-MH-M90	Mosque	Dabhol		Ratnagiri	17°35′07″N 73°10′35″E	Mosque More images
N-MH-M91	Rock cut Caves (Ganesh lena group)	Panhalekaji		Ratnagiri	17°38′45″N 73°14′46″E	Rock cut Caves (Ganesh lena group) More images
N-MH-M92	Suvarnadurg	Harnai		Ratnagiri	17°49′01″N 73°05′06″E	Suvarnadurg More images
N-MH-M93	Jaygad fort	Jaygad		Ratnagiri	17°18′03″N 73°13′17″E	Jaygad fort More images
N-MH-M94	Vijaydurg Fort	Vijaydurg		Ratnagiri	16°33′40″N 73°19′59″E	Vijaydurg Fort More images
N-MH-M95	Muhammad Tughlak's Mosque	Khanapur		Sangli	17°15′37″N 74°42′55″E	Upload Photo
N-MH-M96	Buddhist caves	Jakhinwadi		Satara	17°14′08″N 74°09′08″E	Buddhist caves More images
N-MH-M97	Panta's Kot or Got open space	Karad		Satara	17°17′34″N 74°10′35″E	Panta's Kot or Got open space More images
N-MH-M98	Old Temple of the River Krishna facing the Wai Valley	Old Mahabaleshwar		Satara	17°57′51″N 73°39′55″E	Old Temple of the River Krishna facing the Wai Valley More images
N-MH-M99	Jhabareshwar Mahadeo temple	Phaltan		Satara	17°59′25″N 74°25′49″E	Jhabareshwar Mahadeo temple
N-MH-M100	Tomb of Begami	Ghodeshwar		Sholapur	17°33′49″N 75°34′12″E	Upload Photo
N-MH-M101	Aurangazeb's Fort	Machnur		Sholapur	17°34′04″N 75°33′43″E	Upload Photo
N-MH-M102	Old Temple of Sri Siddheshwar (enclosed in a paved court)	Machnur		Sholapur	17°33′52″N 75°33′33″E	Old Temple of Sri Siddheshwar (enclosed in a paved court) More images
N-MH-M103	Covered colonnade (to the south of the well)	Mahalung		Sholapur	17°52′14″N 75°05′36″E	Upload Photo
N-MH-M104	Hemadpanthi Temple of Mahadeo	Mahalung		Sholapur	17°52′14″N 75°05′46″E	Upload Photo
N-MH-M105	Hemadpanthi Temple of Vithoba	Mahalung		Sholapur	17°52′13″N 75°05′40″E	Upload Photo
N-MH-M106	Hemadpanthi Well	Mahalung		Sholapur	17°52′14″N 75°05′36″E	Upload Photo
N-MH-M107	Mahadev-Hero Stones ASI shifted to Shed at Temple of Haranareshwar & Ardhanarinateshwar at Velapur	Mahalung - Now at Velapur		Sholapur	17°47′30″N 75°03′14″E	Upload Photo
N-MH-M108	Temple of Devi (Yamai)	Mahalung		Sholapur	17°52′15″N 75°05′35″E	Upload Photo
N-MH-M109	Old Fort	Sholapur		Sholapur	17°40′26″N 75°54′08″E	Old Fort More images
N-MH-M110	Gateway and old Maruti temple with Viragal stones on either side.	Velapur		Sholapur	17°47′27″N 75°03′33″E	Gateway and old Maruti temple with Viragal stones on either side. More images
N-MH-M111	Old doubled shrined temple, on the far side of a tank near the last	Velapur		Sholapur	17°47′33″N 75°03′38″E	Upload Photo
N-MH-M112	Old Temple and Viragals or sculptured memorial stones by the road side just outside the village	Velapur		Sholapur	17°47′29″N 75°03′39″E	Upload Photo
N-MH-M113	Old Temple of Sarkarvada locally known as Parasnath temple	Velapur		Sholapur	17°47′27″N 75°03′26″E	Upload Photo
N-MH-M114	Temple of Haranareshwar & Ardhanarinateshwar, one Hemadpanthi tank (small square kunda) & Viragal stone kept in the compound.	Velapur		Sholapur	17°47′30″N 75°03′14″E	Temple of Haranareshwar & Ardhanarinateshwar, one Hemadpanthi tank (small square kunda) & Viragal stone kept in the compound. More images
N-MH-M115	Sindhudurg Fort	Malvan		Sindhdurg	16°02′36″N 73°27′40″E	Sindhudurg Fort More images
N-MH-M116	Temple of Ambarnath	Ambarnath		Thane	19°11′55″N 73°10′36″E	Temple of Ambarnath More images
N-MH-M117	Mahuli Fort	Mahuli		Thane	19°29′28″N 73°15′00″E	Mahuli Fort More images

== See also ==
- List of State Protected Monuments in Maharashtra
- List of Monuments of National Importance in India
- Heritage structures in Mumbai
