= Talagad =

Indian fort

Talgad Fort
- Raigad district, Maharashtra
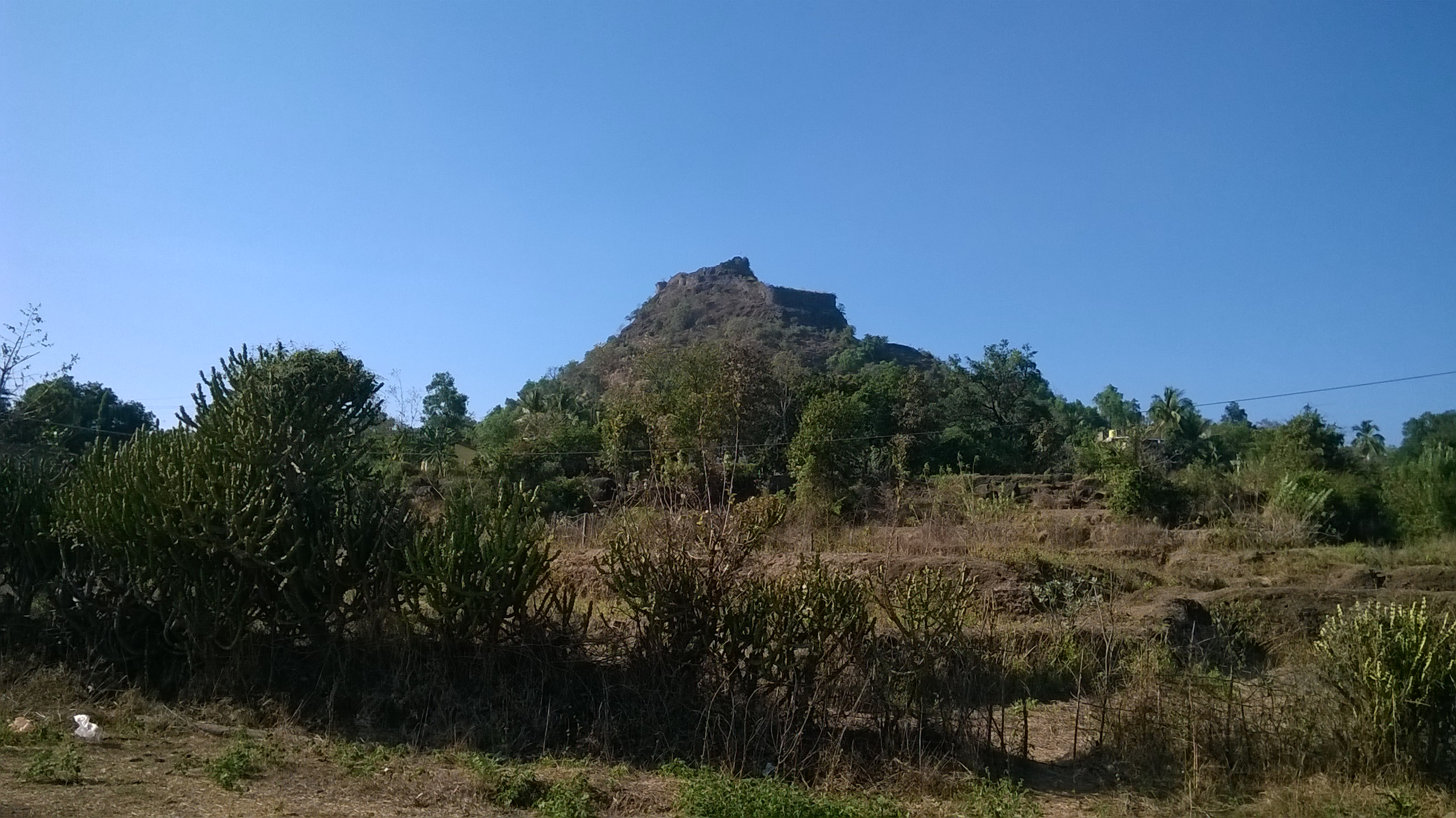
- Talgad fort

Site information
- Type: Hill fort
- Owner: Government of India
- Open to the public: Yes Ahmadnagar Sultanate (-1648); Maratha Empire (1648-1689); Janjira State(1689-1735); Maratha Empire (1735-1818); United Kingdom: East India Company (1818-1857); British Raj (1857-1947); India (1947-)
- Condition: Ruins

Location
- Shown within Maharashtra
- Coordinates: 18°17′33″N 73°08′07″E
- Height: 304m(1000 ft)

Site history
- Materials: Stone

Talgad fort is located 18 km south of the Roha town on Roha-Tala-Indapur road. This fort is at an altitude of 1000 feet. This fort is in form of a narrow strip 20 meters in width. This fort is situated on a narrow spur guarded by fortification. This fort served to keep watch on the enemy and the trade route from Maval to the sea ports around. Also this fort was used to keep check on the activity of Sidhhis of Janjira. Ghosalgad fort is also visible from this fort.

== History ==
It is not known who built this fort. In the 16th century, this fort was under the control of Adilshah of Bijapur. Chhatrapati Shivaji maharaj won this fort in 1648. In 1659 this fort was encircled by troops of Siddhi of Janjira when Afzalkhan had tried to kill Chhatrapati Shivaji maharaj at Pratapgad. However Chhatrapati Shivaji maharaj killed Afzalkhan and knowing this Siddhi also returned with the troops to Janjira. In the Purandar treaty, Chhatrapati Shivaji maharaj kept this fort with himself along with 11 other forts while surrendering the other forts. After the death of Chhatrapati Shivaji maharaj this fort was captured by Siddhi. In 1735 Bajiro peshwa-I captured this fort under Maratha rule. Finally, Col. Prother captured this fort in 1818. It is also said that the clothes which were worn by Chhatrapati Shivaji during his coronation were brought from this fort.

== Places to see ==
The long fortification around the narrow strip of Machi is in good condition. There are many rock cut water cisterns on the Balekilla hill. There is an idol of Veer maruti near the main gate. The toilet block on the fortification are also seen. The fortification is in two layers. From the top of the fort Ghosale gad is clearly visible. There are four water storage on the top of the fort. Kuda caves are near the fort. There are many more tourist places you could visit when you explore this Talagad trek. This list includes Wave Dam, Chandika Temple, kude caves, Murud Janjira, Forests Hill Tala and many religious temple in village Tala. The Talagad gives a very beautiful glimpse of scenery from the top even in summers and rainy season, which attracts many trekkers.

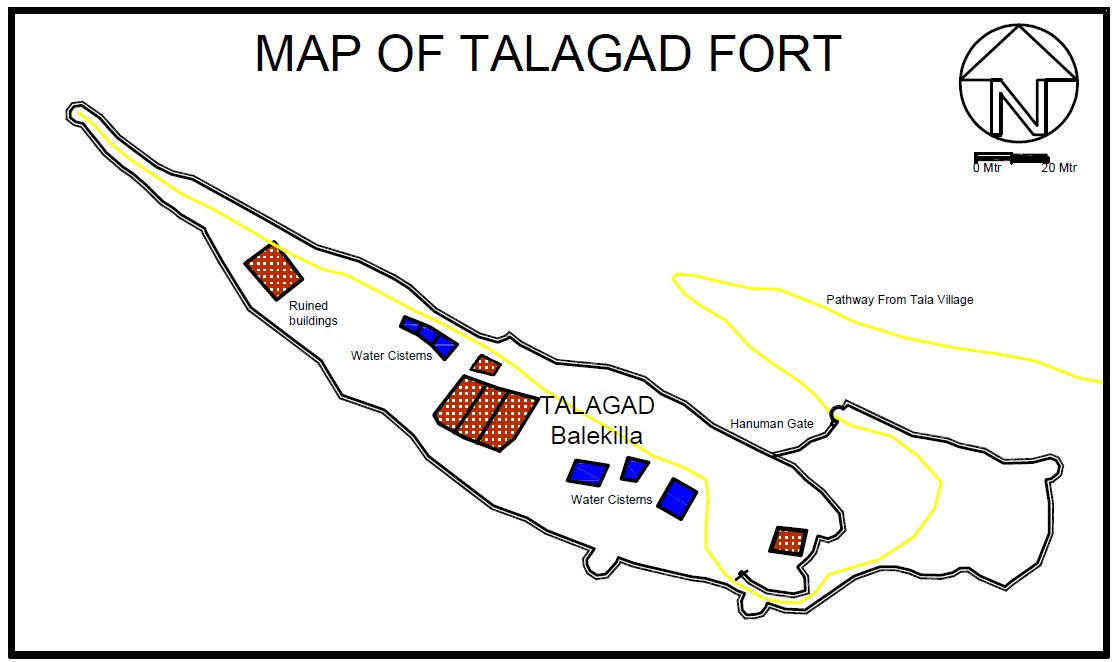
Map of Talagad Fort

== How to reach ==
There are regular state transport buses and private vehicles which run between Roha, Indapur and Tala. The path from the town goes straight to the main entrance of the fort. The trek rout is of 45 minutes. The trek to the fort is simple and safe. There is no place for night halt on the fort.

== Gallery ==
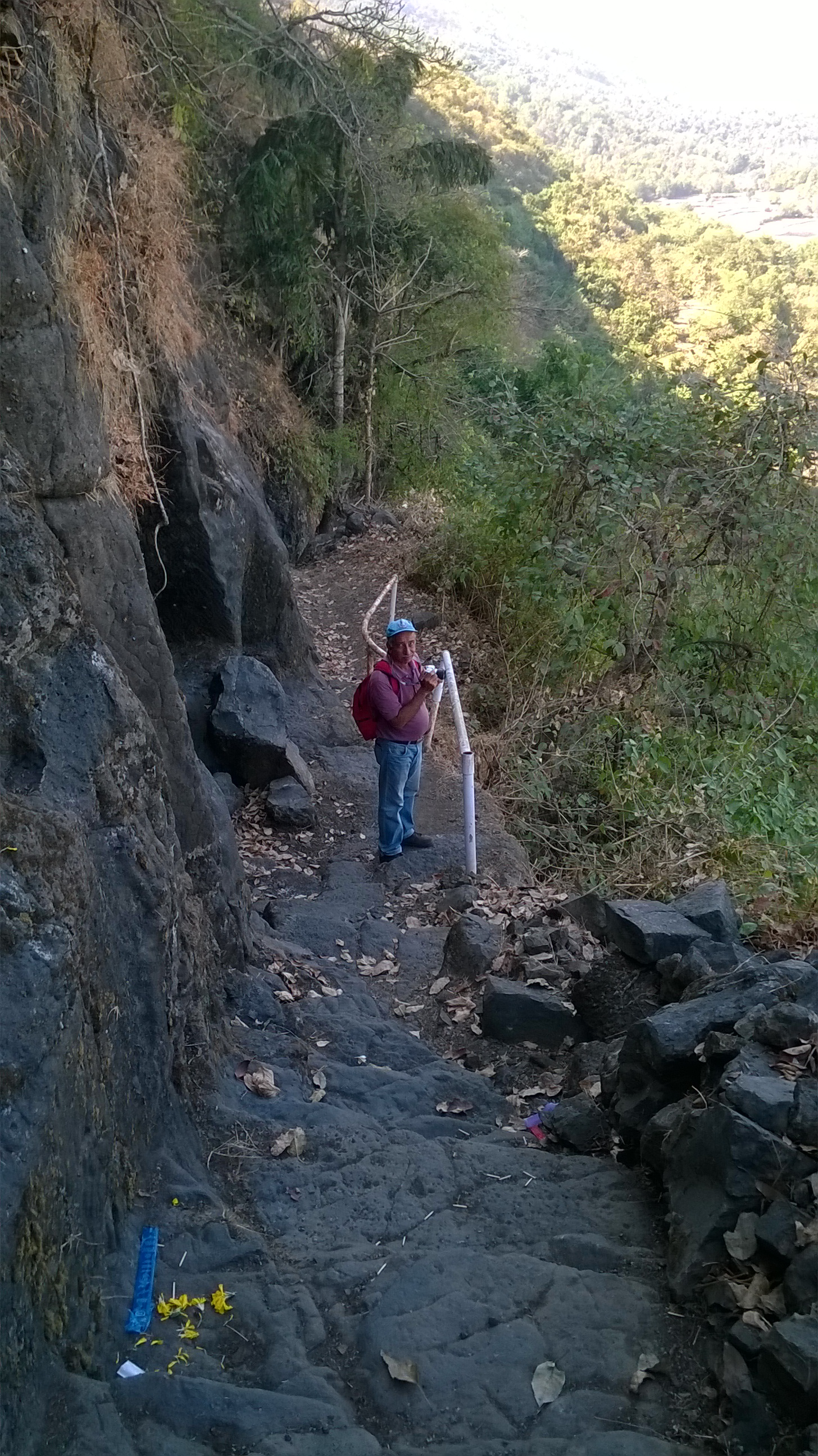
Way to the fort

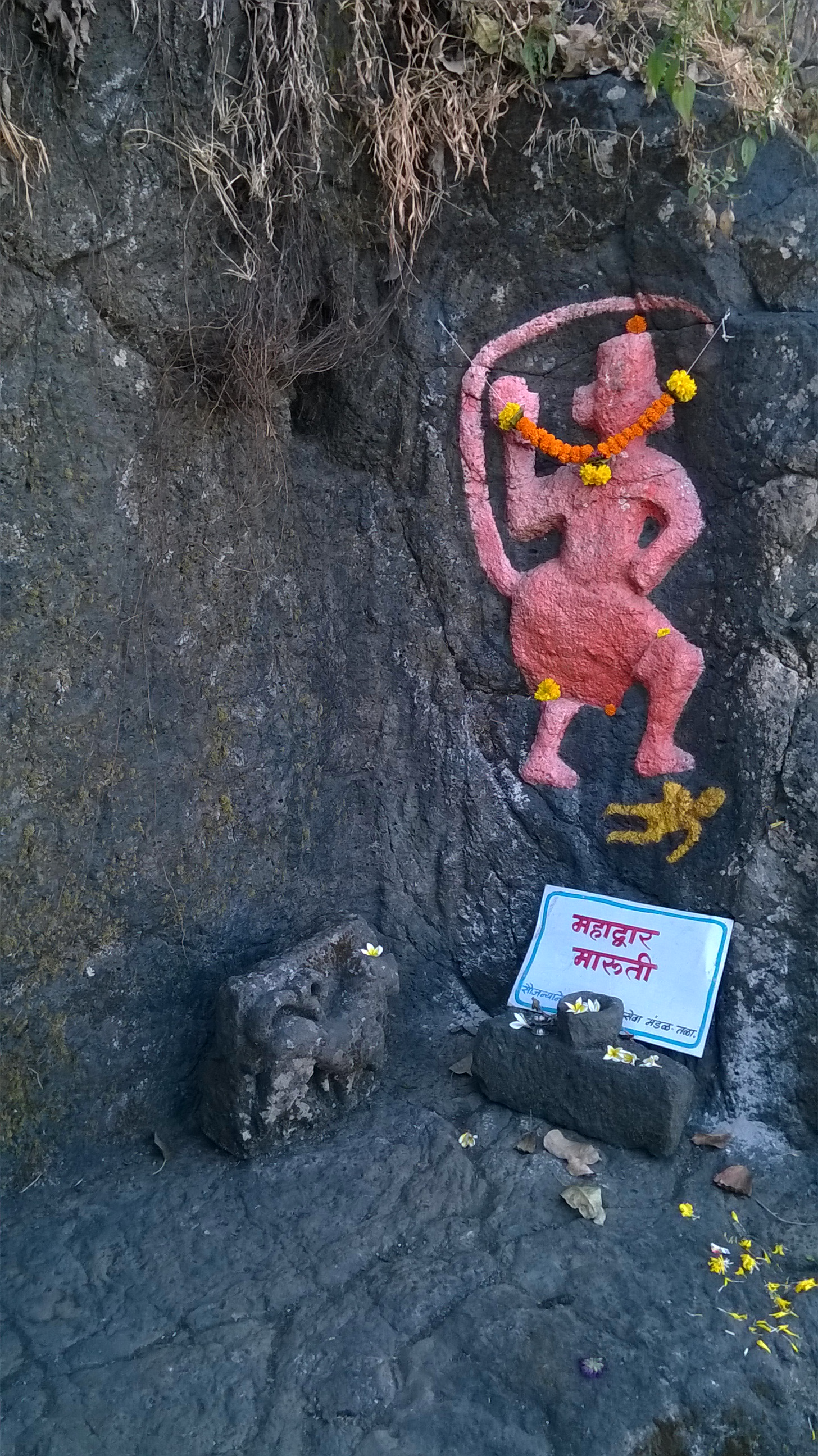
Veer maruti idol

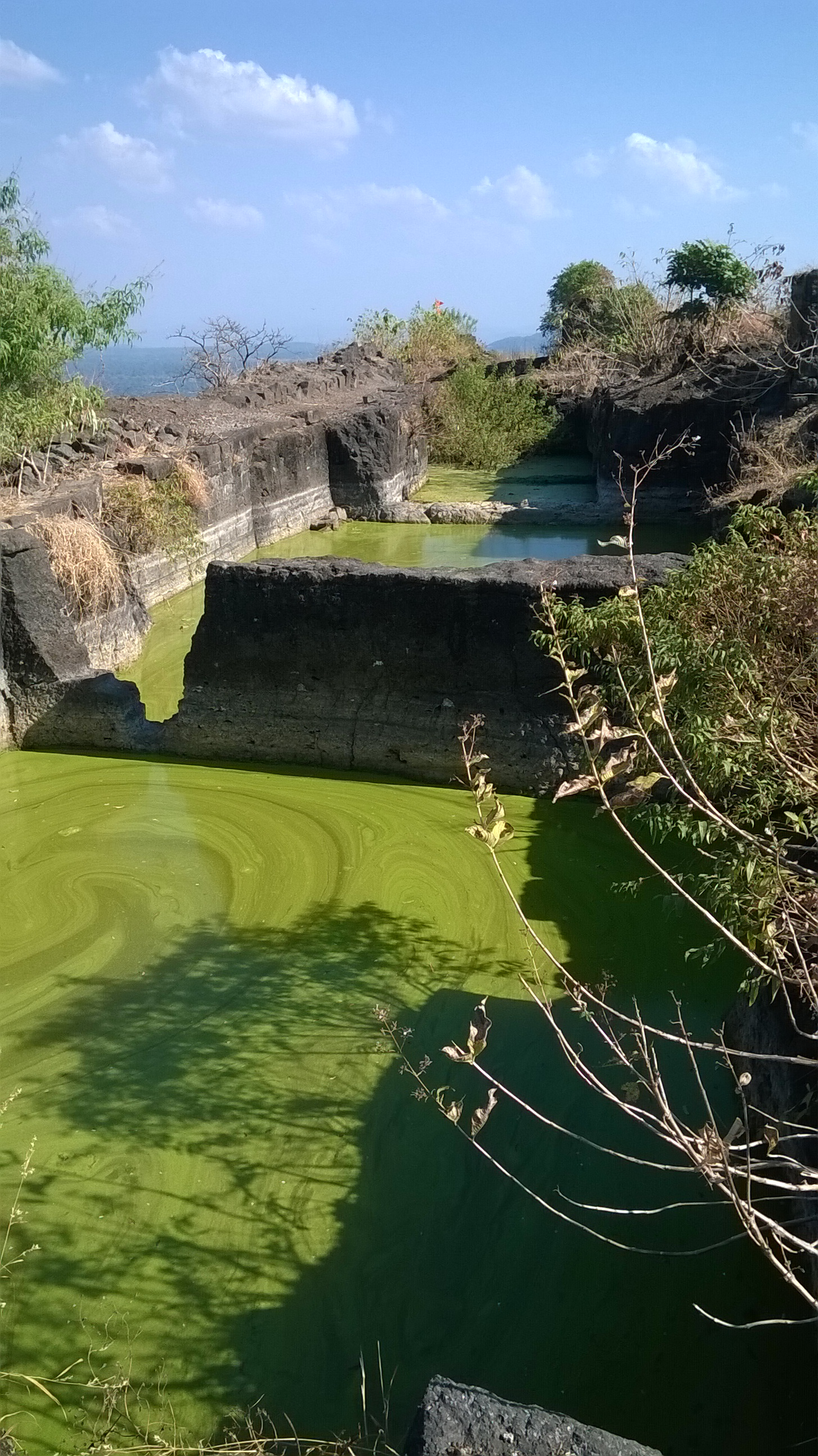
Rock cut water cistern

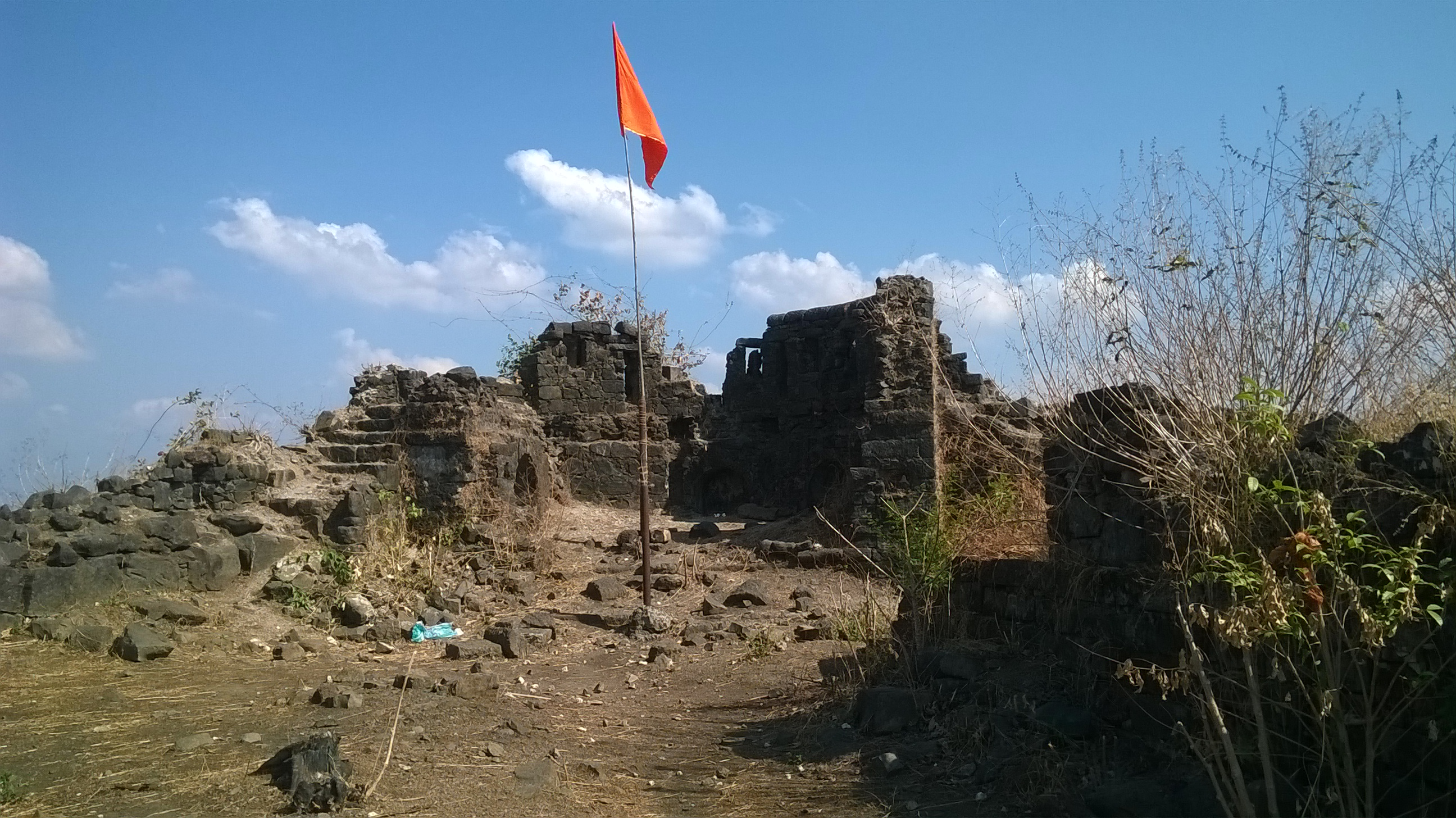
Fortification
