= Dilawar Khan's Tomb and Mosque =

Mosque and tomb in Khed, Maharashtra, India

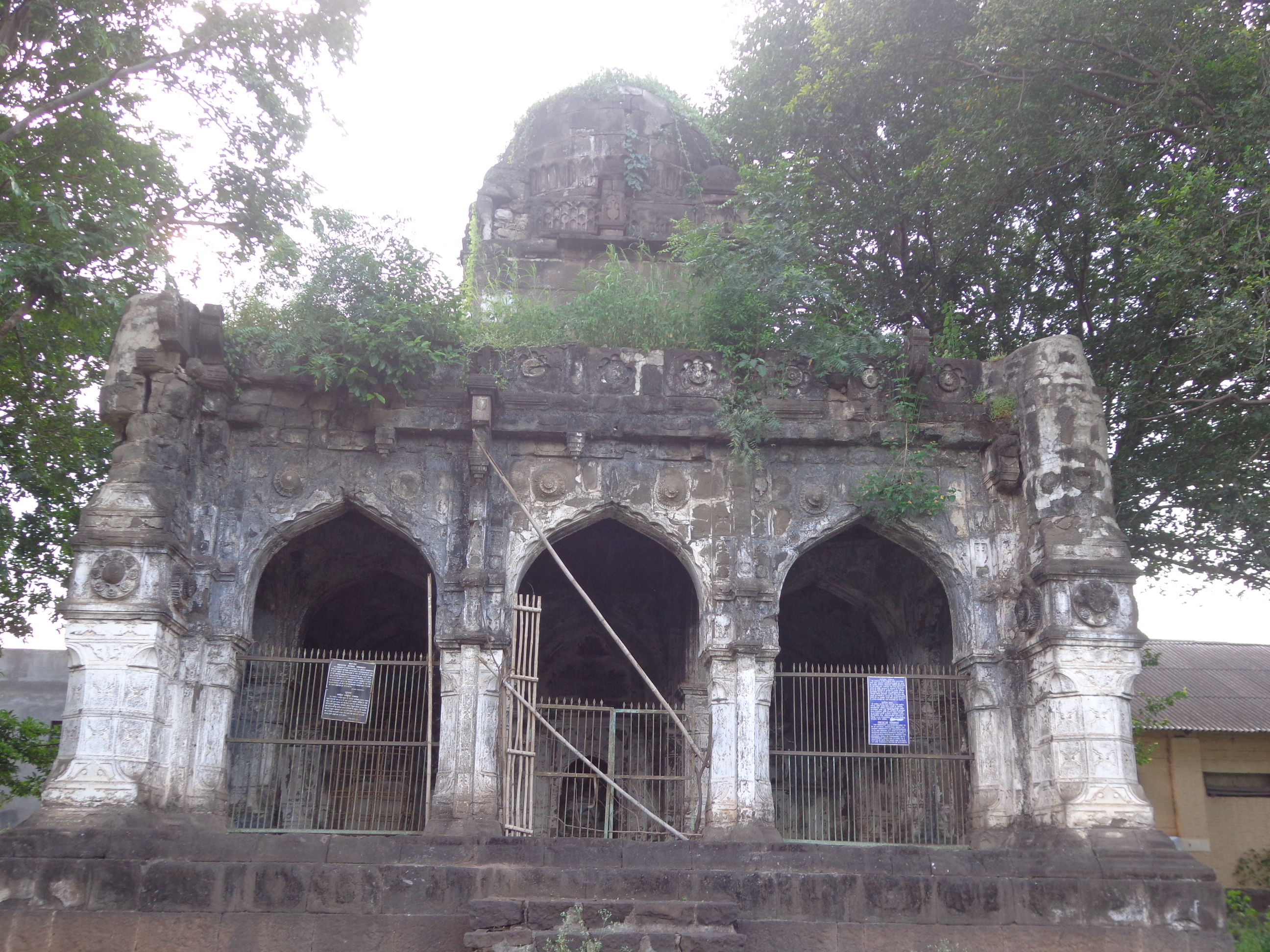
- The former mosque, in partial ruins, in 2012

- Location of the former mosque and dargah in Maharashtra

Religion
- Affiliation: Islam (former)
- Ecclesiastical or organizational status: Mosque and dargah
- Status: Inactive (partial ruinous state)

Location
- Location: Rajgurunagar (Khed), Pune, Maharashtra
- Country: India
- Interactive map of Dilawar Khan's Tomb and Mosque
- Administration: Archaeological Survey of India
- Coordinates: 18°51′18″N 73°53′04″E

Architecture
- Type: Mosque architecture
- Style: Indo-Islamic; Mughal
- Founder: Dilawar Khan (mosque)
- Completed: 1613 CE

Specifications
- Length: 11 m (35 ft)
- Width: 8.5 m (28 ft)
- Domes: One each (mosque and tomb)
- Materials: Stone
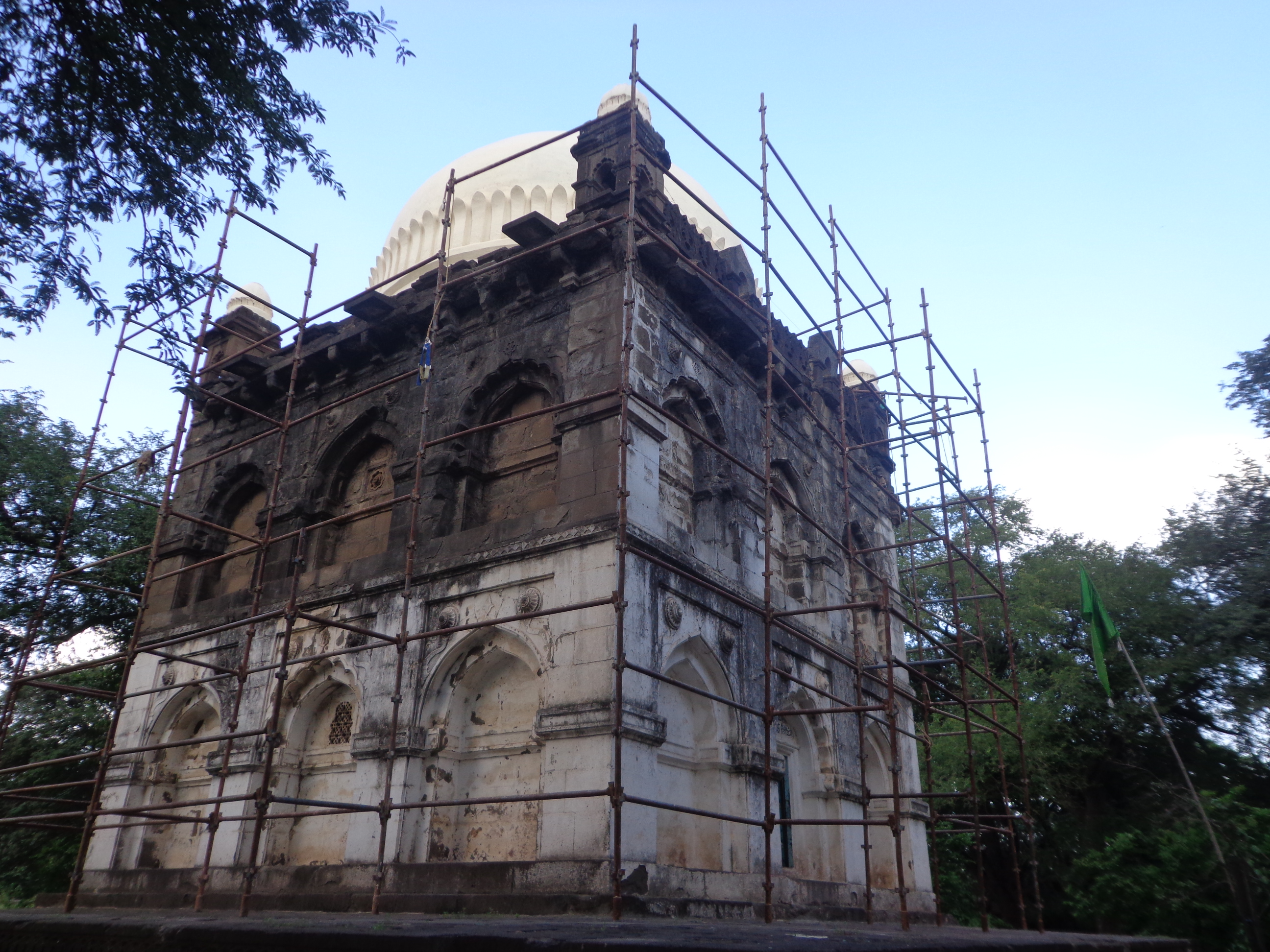
- The tomb, undergoing restoration in 2012, with restored dome

Monument of National Importance
- Official name: Dilawar Khan's Masjid
- Reference no.: N-MH-M30

Monument of National Importance
- Official name: Dilawar Khan's Tomb
- Reference no.: N-MH-M31

The Dilawar Khan's Tomb and Mosque are a dargah and former mosque, in partial ruins, located in a walled complex in Rajgurunagar (formerly known as Khed), in the Pune district of the state of Maharashtra, India. The mosque was built by Dilawar Khan, a Mughal Empire commander, in 1613 CE, and the tomb holds his grave. Both the tomb and former mosque are Monuments of National Importance, administered by Archeological Survey of India.

== Tomb ==
The tomb is built out of stone and lime mortar. The building is square, and with each wall containing two horizontal rows of three recessed arches. The central arch in the lower row and the two side arches in the upper row are minutely cusped.

It is surmounted by a hemispherical dome, placed upon a circular drum. Flat kiosks stand at all four corners of the roof. An inscription over the main entrance records the date of Dilawar Khan's son as 1022 AH (1613/1614 CE).

== Mosque ==
The mosque is located at the western end of the complex. Completed in 1613 CE and built by Nizam Shahi commander Dilawar Khan, the mosque measures 10.7 by 8.5 metres (35 by 28 ft). The façade contains three cusped arched entrances, with lotus medallions on the spandrels, leading into the interior. The interior is divided into three aisles and two bays by means of pillars with octagonal shafts. It is surmounted by a dome, resting on a very tall square drum. As of 2020, the mosque was in a partial ruinous state.

== See also ==
- Islam in India
- List of mosques in India
- List of Monuments of National Importance in Mumbai circle
