= Chandragad Fort =

Fort in Maharashtra, India

- Part of Sahyadri Hill Range
- Raigad district, Maharashtra

Site information
- Type: Hill fort
- Owner: Government of India
- Controlled by: Maratha Empire (1656-1765); United Kingdom: East India Company (1818-1857); British Raj (1857-1947); India (1947-)
- Open to the public: Yes
- Condition: Ruins

Location
- Shown within Maharashtra Chandragad Fort (India)
- Coordinates: 18°00′03.9″N 73°37′10.0″E
- Height: 2337 Mt.

Site history
- Materials: Stone

Chandragad Fort / Dhavalgad Fort is a fort located 182 km from Mumbai, in raigad district, of Maharashtra. This fort was an important fort in raigad district as a watch over for the Varandha Ghattrade routes from Bhor to kokan. The fort is surrounded by forest and hill slopes.

== History ==
The fort is close to the Krishna river valley. The fort was captured By Chh.Shivaji Maharaj from Chandrarao More on 15 January 1656 along with Kangori and Rayari. After the death of Chh. Sambhaji maharaj this fort was captured by Itkadar Khan Aka Zulfikar khan who was a commander of Aurangzeb.

== How to reach ==
The trek route starts from Village Dhavale which is located in District Raigad, Taluka Poladpur. Poladpur to Dhavale distance is 20– 25 km. The path passes through the small Shelarwadi hamlet.

== Places to see ==
There are about 14 rock-cut water tanks and few dilapidated building structures on the fort and one shivleeng is their.

== See also ==
- List of forts in Maharashtra
- List of forts in India
- Marathi People
- List of Maratha dynasties and states
- Maratha War of Independence
- Battles involving the Maratha Empire
- Maratha Army
- Maratha titles
- Military history of India
