= Khokari Tombs =

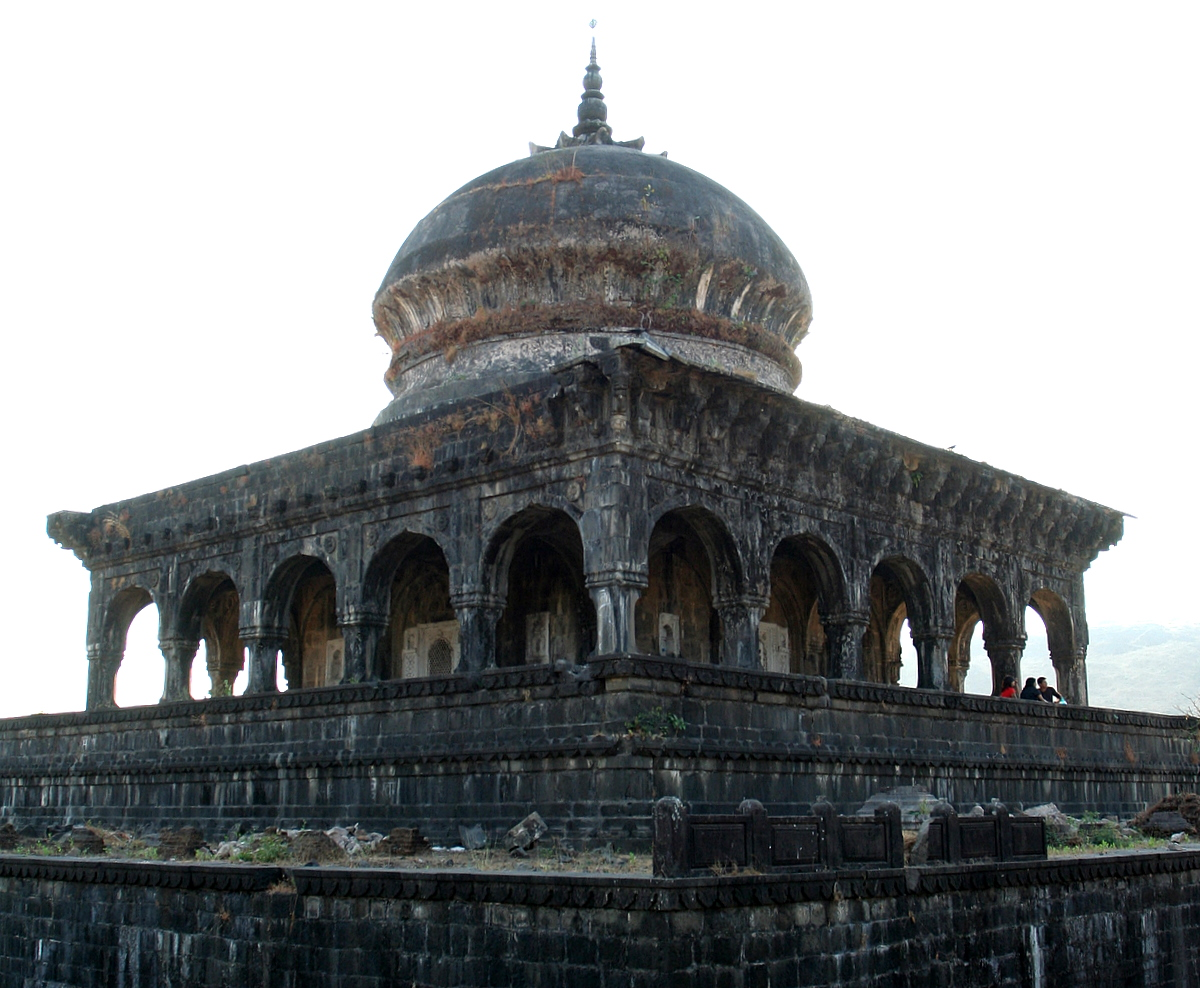
- Tomb of Sidi Surul Khan
- Interactive map of the Khokari Tombs area

General information
- Architectural style: Indo-Saracenic
- Location: Khokari, Murud, India
- Coordinates: 18.301561°N 72.980928°E

The Khokari (or Khokri) tombs are three 500-year-old massive stone tombs of the early rulers of the erstwhile Janjira State in western India, near Murud in Maharashtra state.

== History ==
The largest is the tomb of Sidi Surul Khan, who was chief of Janjira State from 1707 to 1734. One of the two smaller tombs is that of Sidi Kasim, commonly known as Yakut Khan, who was in command of Janjira (1670–1677), of the Mugal fleet (1677–1696), and again of Janjira (1696–1707). The other small tomb is of his brother Khairiyat Khan, who was in command of Danda–Rajpuri (1670–1677) and of Janjira (1677–1696).

The tomb of Surul Khan is said to have been built during his lifetime. Yakut Khan's tomb has an Arabic inscription stating that he died on Thursday 30th Jama-Dilaval AH 1118 (AD 1707). Khairiyat Khan's tomb also has an inscription. The figures of the date of his death are AH 1018, but the Arabic words give the date H. 1108 (AD 1696). The latter date is believed to be the correct one.

The tombs were kept in repair by the Nawab, who had assigned to the village of Savli-Mitha-gar a yearly revenue of Rs. 2,000 for the maintenance of Surul Khan's tomb, and by the village of Dodakal for the maintenance of Yakut Khan's and Khairiyat Khan's tombs. In the past, Kuran was read at these tombs on Thursday nights, on yearly death-days or when urus were celebrated.

The monument, which is done in the Indo-Saracenic style, is being restored by the Mumbai Circle of the Archaeological Survey of India (ASI).

== Gallery ==
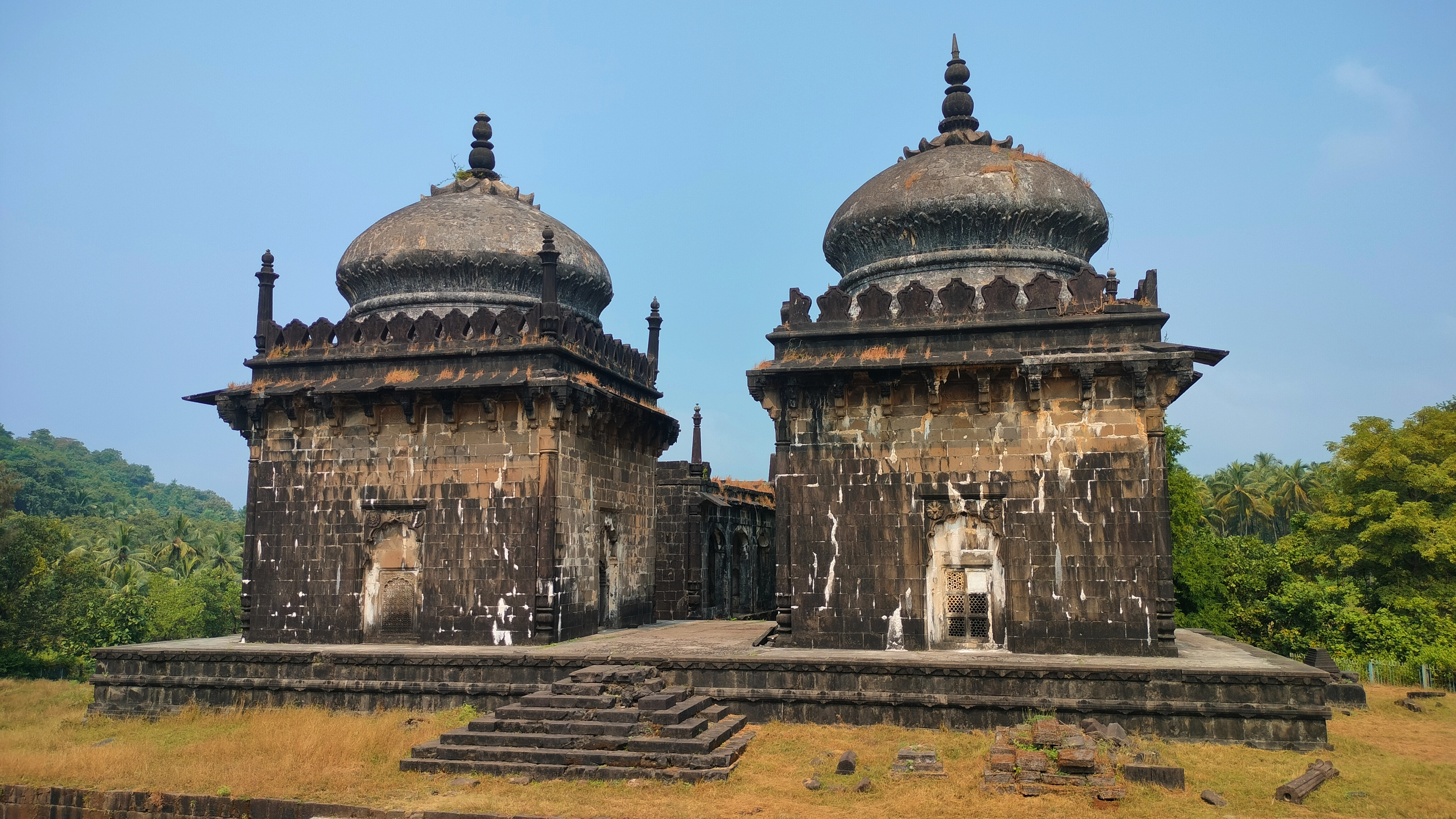
Tombs of Yakut Khan and Khairiat Khan

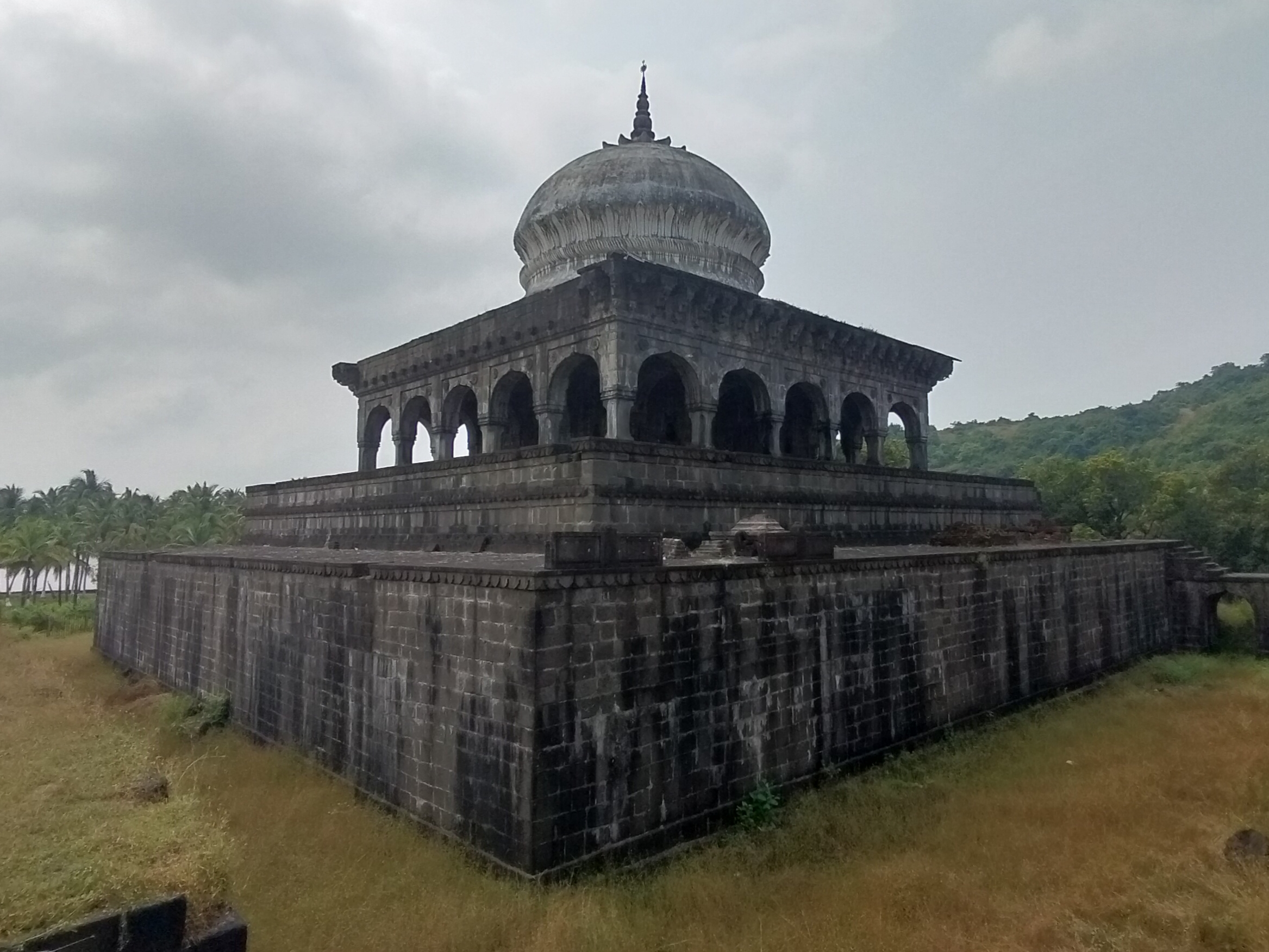
Main tomb

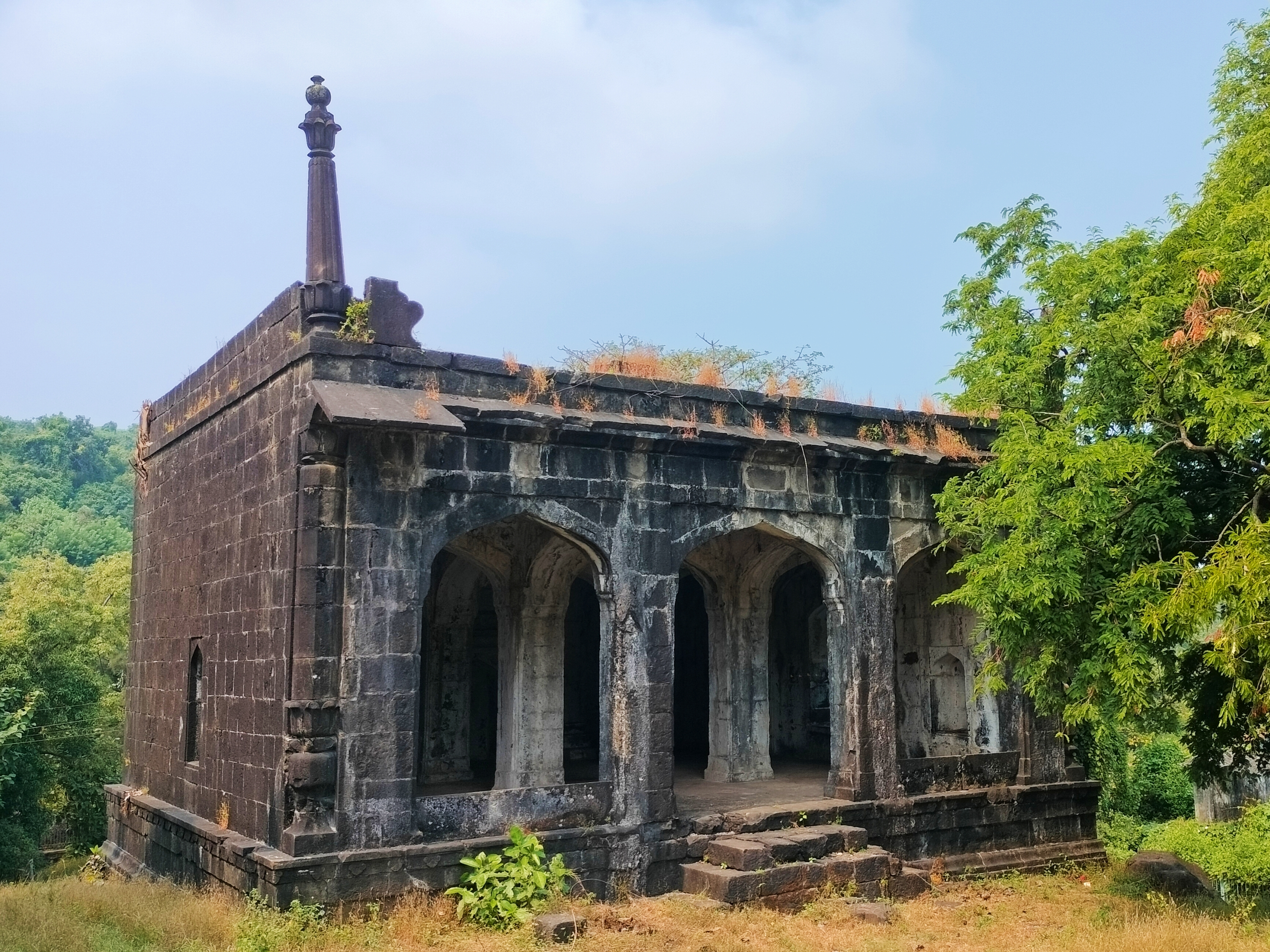
Mazjid

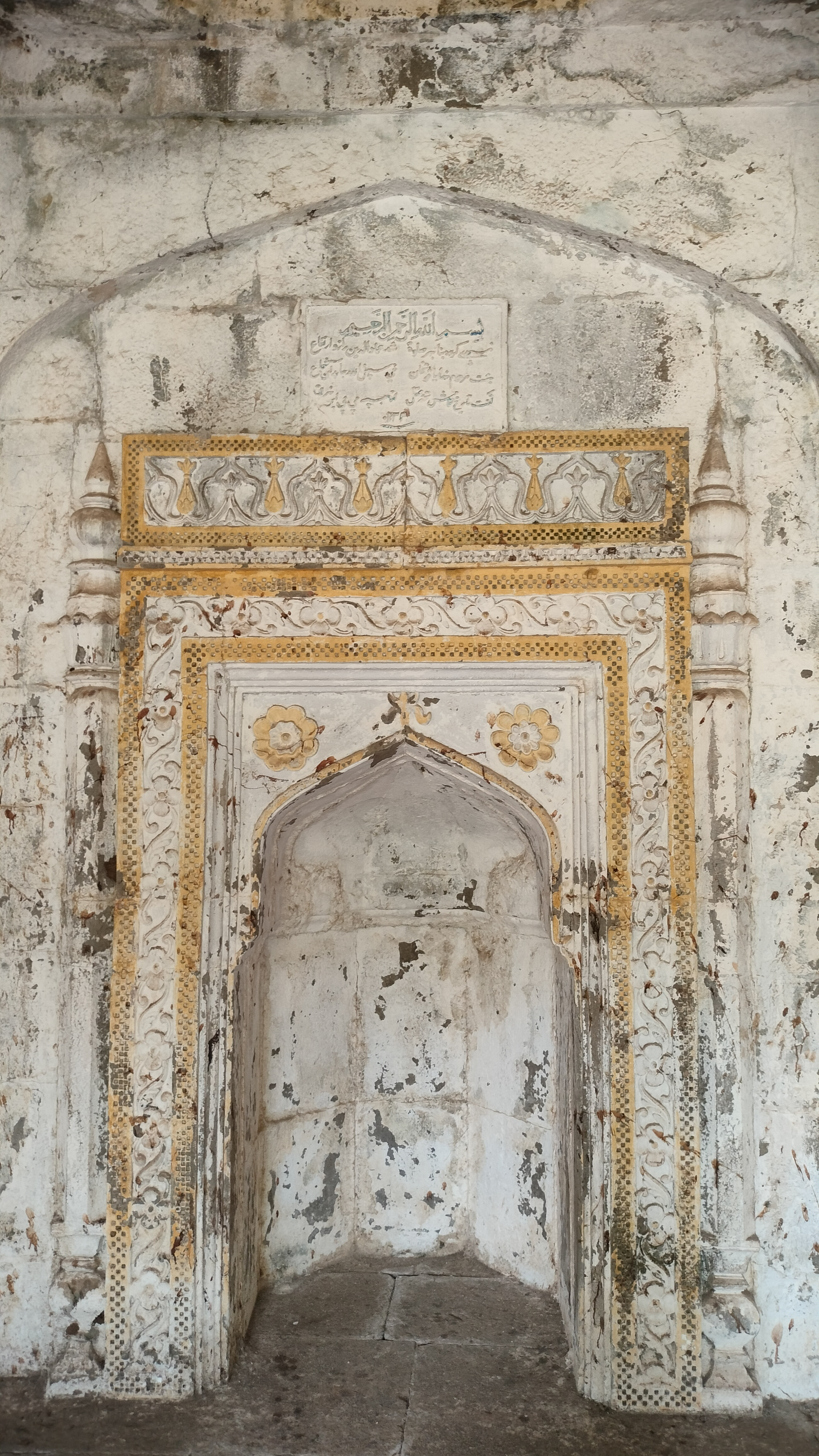
Arch and inscription inside Masjid
