= Varandha Ghat =

Mountain pass in Maharashtra, India

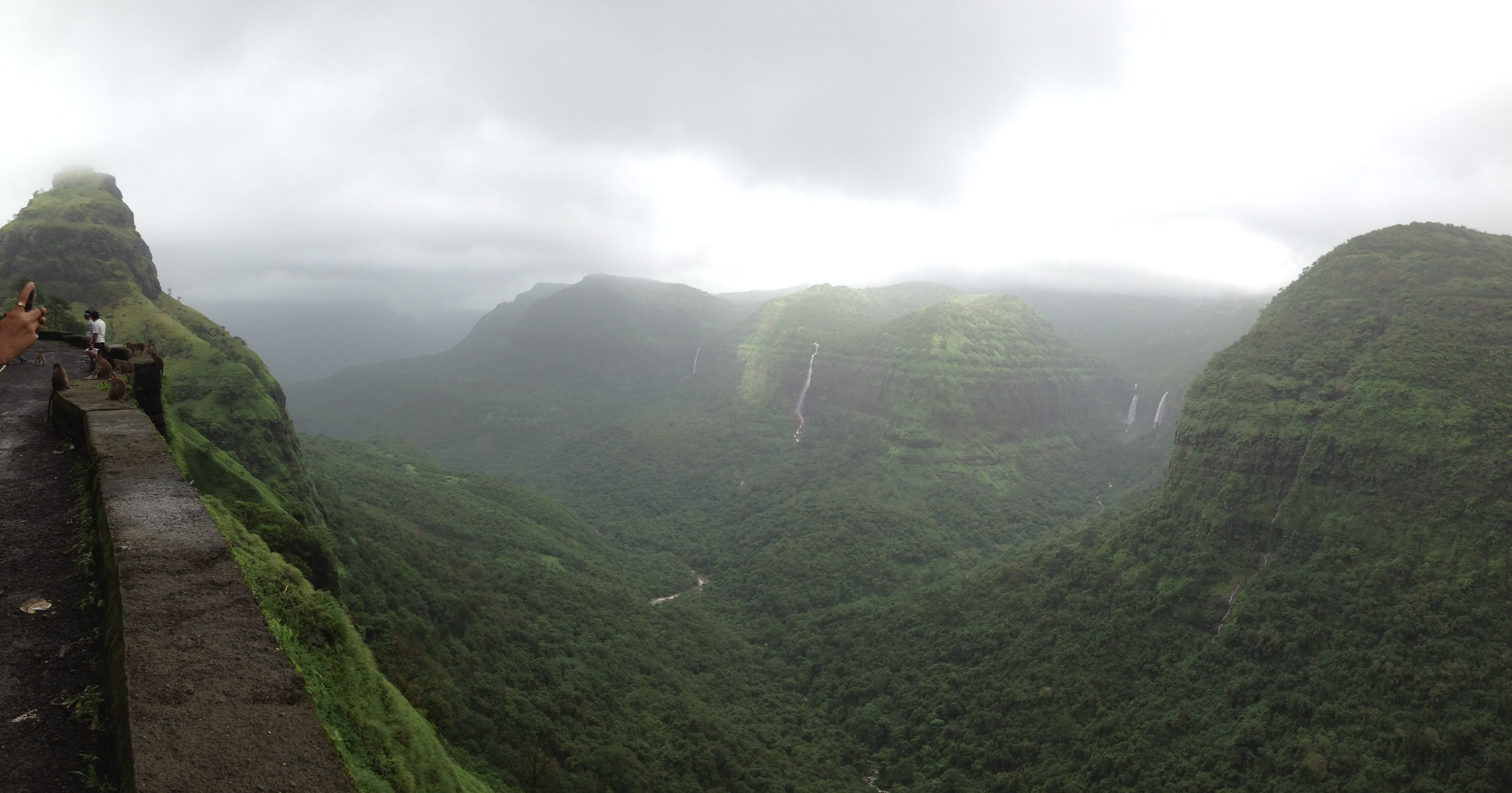
- Interactive map of Varandha Ghat

Third Approach
- Location: Maharashtra, India
- Range: Sahyadri
- Coordinates: 18.128825°N 73.607345°E

Varandha Ghat (Marathi: वरंधा घाट) is a mountain passage located between NH4 and Konkan in Maharashtra, India for road traffic. Situated on the crest of the Western Ghat mountain ranges, Varandha Ghat is noted for its surroundings, comprising scenic waterfalls, lakes and dense woods.

== Geography ==
The Varandha ghat cuts the Sahyadri range to join Bhor to Mahad and is one of the routes between Konkan and Pune. It is 108 kilometres (67 mi) from Pune. This ghat stretches almost 10 kilometres (6.2 mi). The route from Nivangan, Niradevghar Dam up to the start of the ghat has many twists and turns and skirts the backwaters of the dam.

Shivtharghal is a famous tourist / religious place about 15 km away from this road.
