= Birwadi fort =

Hill fortress in Maharashtra, India

BirwadiFort
- बिरवाडी किल्ला
- Raigad district, Maharashtra
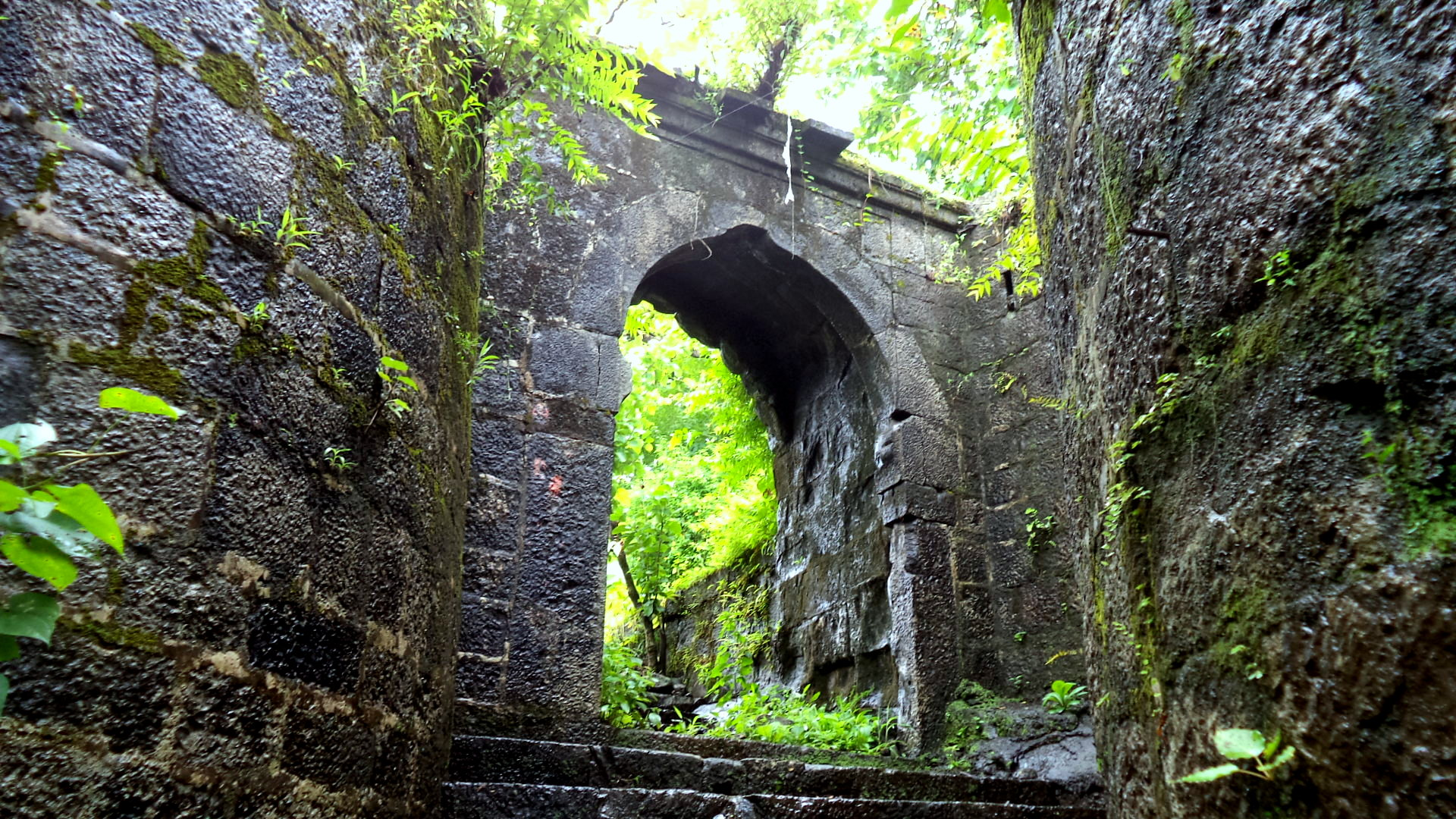
- Birwadi fort Entrance

Site information
- Type: Hill fort
- Owner: Government of India
- Controlled by: Ahmadnagar (1521-1594) Portugal (1594) Maratha Empire (1739-1818) East India Company (1818-1857) British Raj (1857-1947) India (1947-)
- Open to the public: Yes
- Condition: Ruins

Location
- Shown within Maharashtra
- Coordinates: 18°25′24.7″N 73°02′30.9″E
- Height: 1200 Ft.

Site history
- Materials: Stone

Birwadi fort (Marathi: बिरवाडी किल्ला) is hill fortress located in the village of Birwadi in Roha taluka, Raigad district, Maharashtra, India. Birwadi village is about 3 km away from Chanera village, which is on the Roha–Salav road. The fort looks like a small hillock from a distance.

== Transportation ==
The fort is located 18 kilometres (11 mi) south west of Roha on a hill range that runs perpendicular to the Western Ghats.

Birwadi fort is connected by road to the village Chanera. State buses and Rickshaw are available to reach Chanera from Roha. The way to the fort is from the back of the Newly constructed Devi temple. It takes about 45 minutes to walk to the top of the fort.

== History ==
In 1648, this fort was built by Shivaji Maharaj, along with Lingana fort, after capturing Kalyan. Birwadi fort was used to keep watch on the [[[Kundalika River]] and to check the activities of Siddhi.

During the British Raj the surroundings were used as a game shooting reserve for district officers, with a campsite around 1 mile (1.6 km) from the fort.

== Places to see ==
There are four corner bastions and the main gate in good condition. There are many stone cut water cisterns on the fort. Two cannons are now moved to the temple at the base of the fort. The view from the summit is pleasing with rice-fields and dense pockets of the jungle around.

== Night halt ==
The night halt can either be made in the Govt. school in the village or in the Devi temple.

== Gallery ==
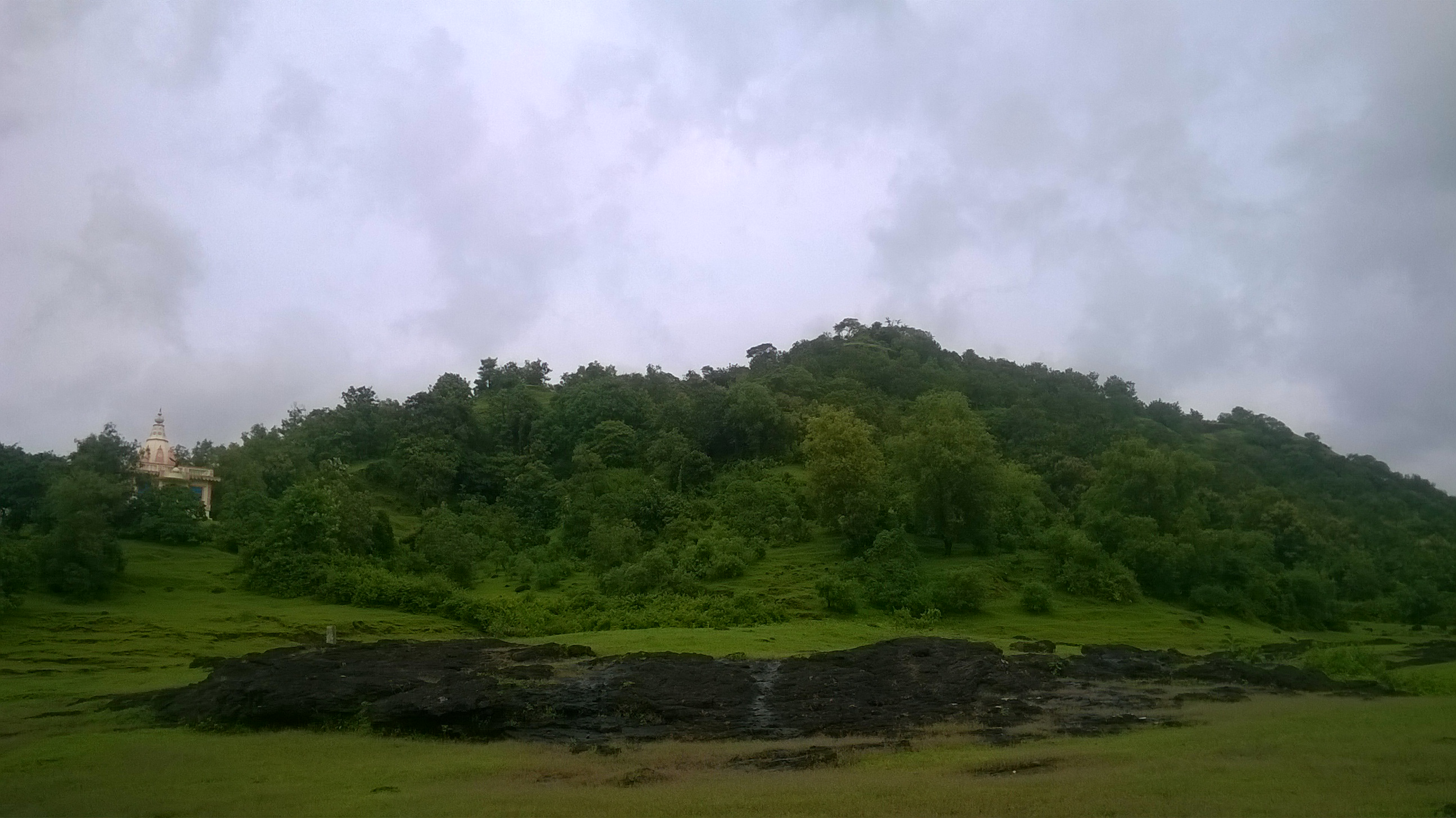
fort view from the village

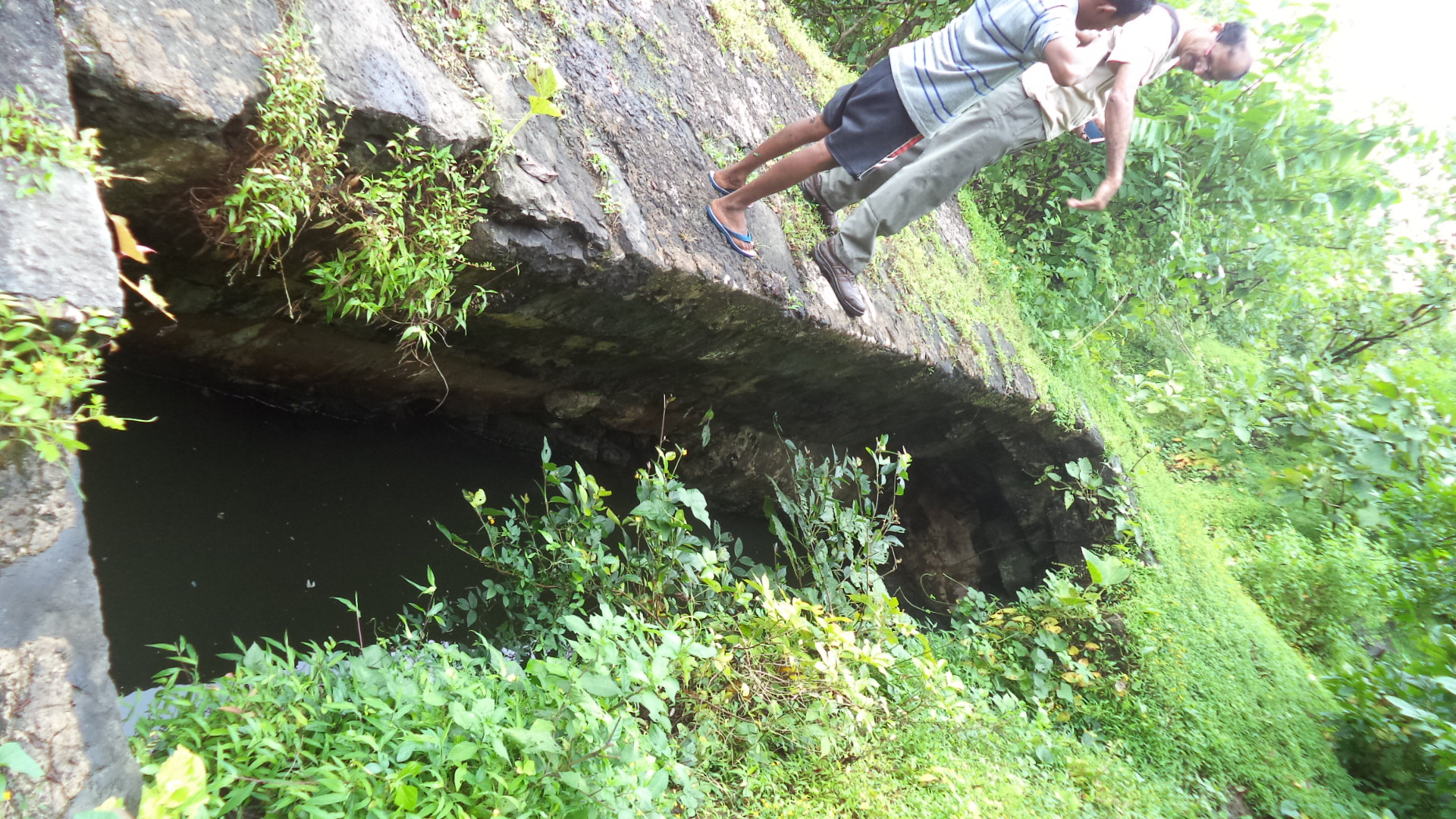
Water System

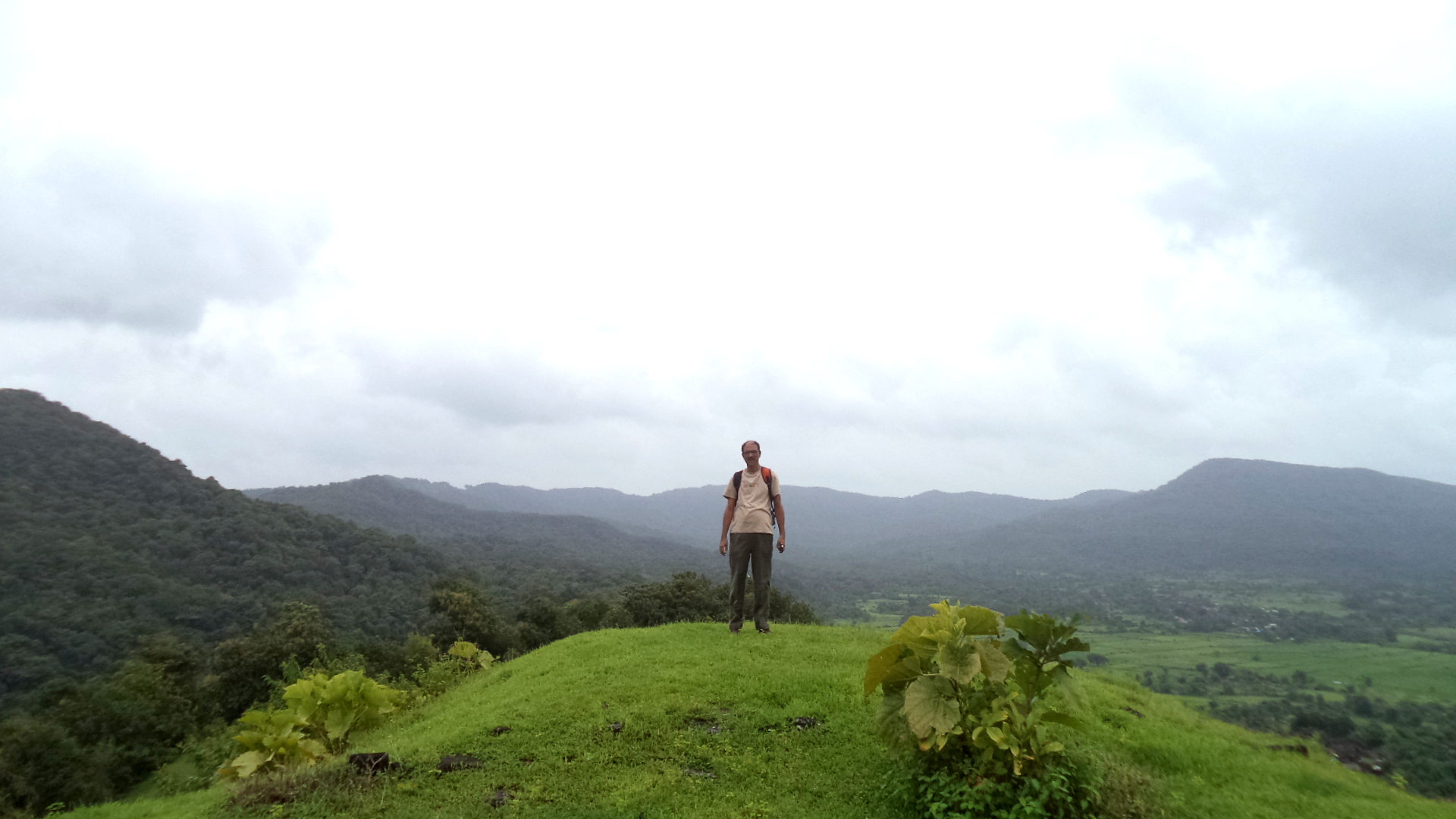
Highest point

== See also ==
- List of forts in Maharashtra
- List of forts in India
- Marathi People
- Maratha Navy
- List of Maratha dynasties and states
- Maratha War of Independence
- Battles involving the Maratha Empire
- Maratha Army
- Maratha titles
- Military history of India
