= Pohale Caves =

Caves in Kolhapur District, Maharashtra, India

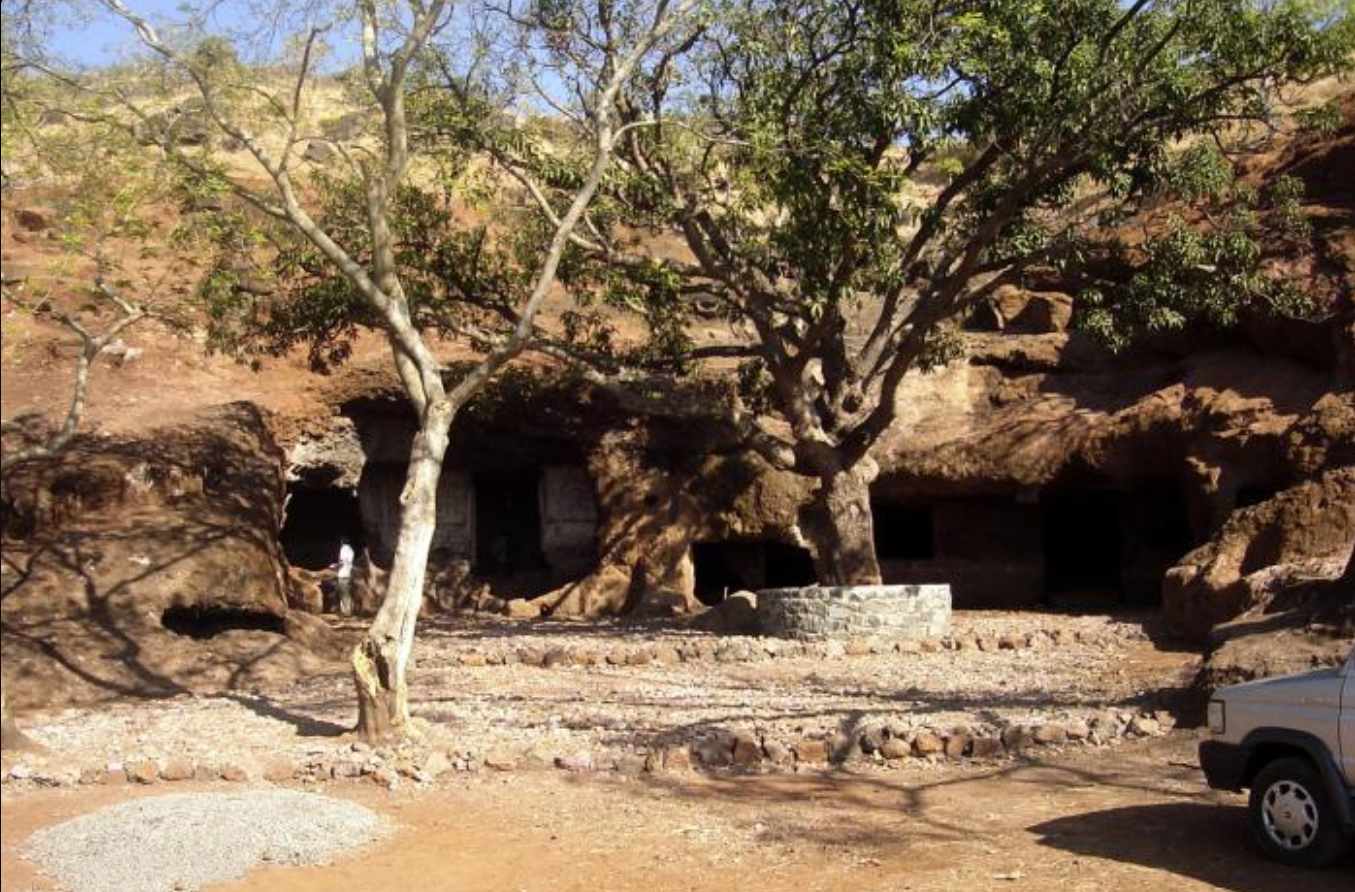
- Pohale Caves

- Location within India Location within Maharashtra
- Coordinates: 16.790872°N 74.191172°E

Pohale Caves, also Pohala Caves or Pawala Caves, are a group of Buddhist caves located in Kolhapur District, Maharashtra, India, about 15 km northeast of Kolhapur.

The caves are rather plain and were excavated in a rocky area near Jyotiba's hill.

There is one large vihara, about square of about 34', with 14 columns on three sides and 22 cells around the central hall (7’ long, 5’ broad and 7’ high). There is also a Chaitya, and one more cave with a raised rock-cut seat for a teacher, with a watern cistern.
