= Habsi Gumbaz =

Coordinates: 19°11′46″N 73°53′55″E

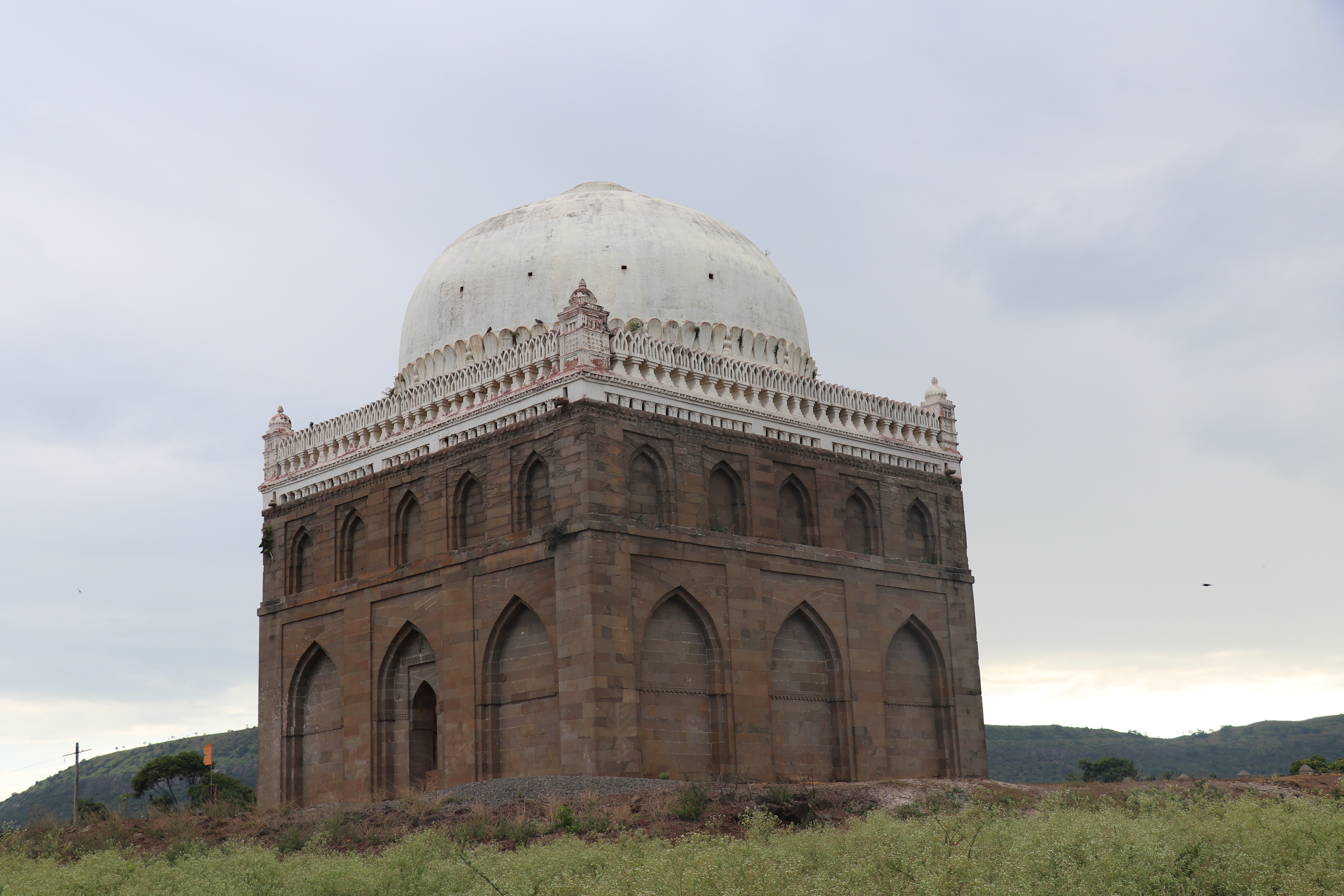

Habsi Gumbaz or Saudagar Gumbaz is a tomb located on the outskirts of Junnar. It is listed as a monument of national importance.

== History ==
The date of the construction of the tomb is not known. However, Pushkar Sohoni states that it must be one of the earliest structures built by the Nizam Shahis.

== Description ==
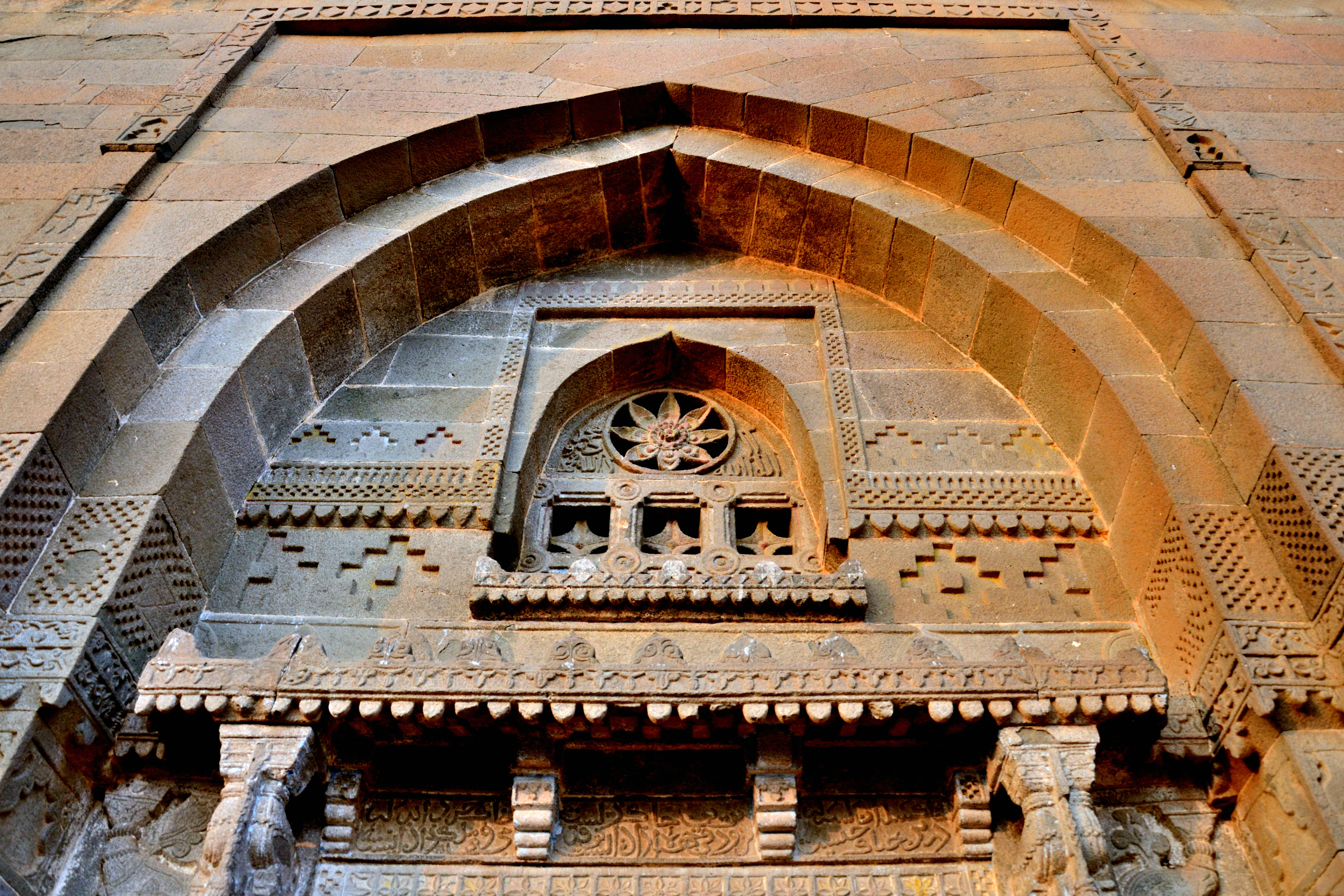
Decoration above the entrance

The tomb has a square plan. It is built out of dressed stone blocks, held in place by lime mortar. Stucco is used for ornamentation. On each side, there are three large arches at the bottom, and five smaller arches at the top. The entrance is through the middle arch on the southern side. Over the entrance is an inscription relating to Shia beliefs. It is topped by a large dome.
