= Kuda Caves =

Cave in India (Maharashtra)

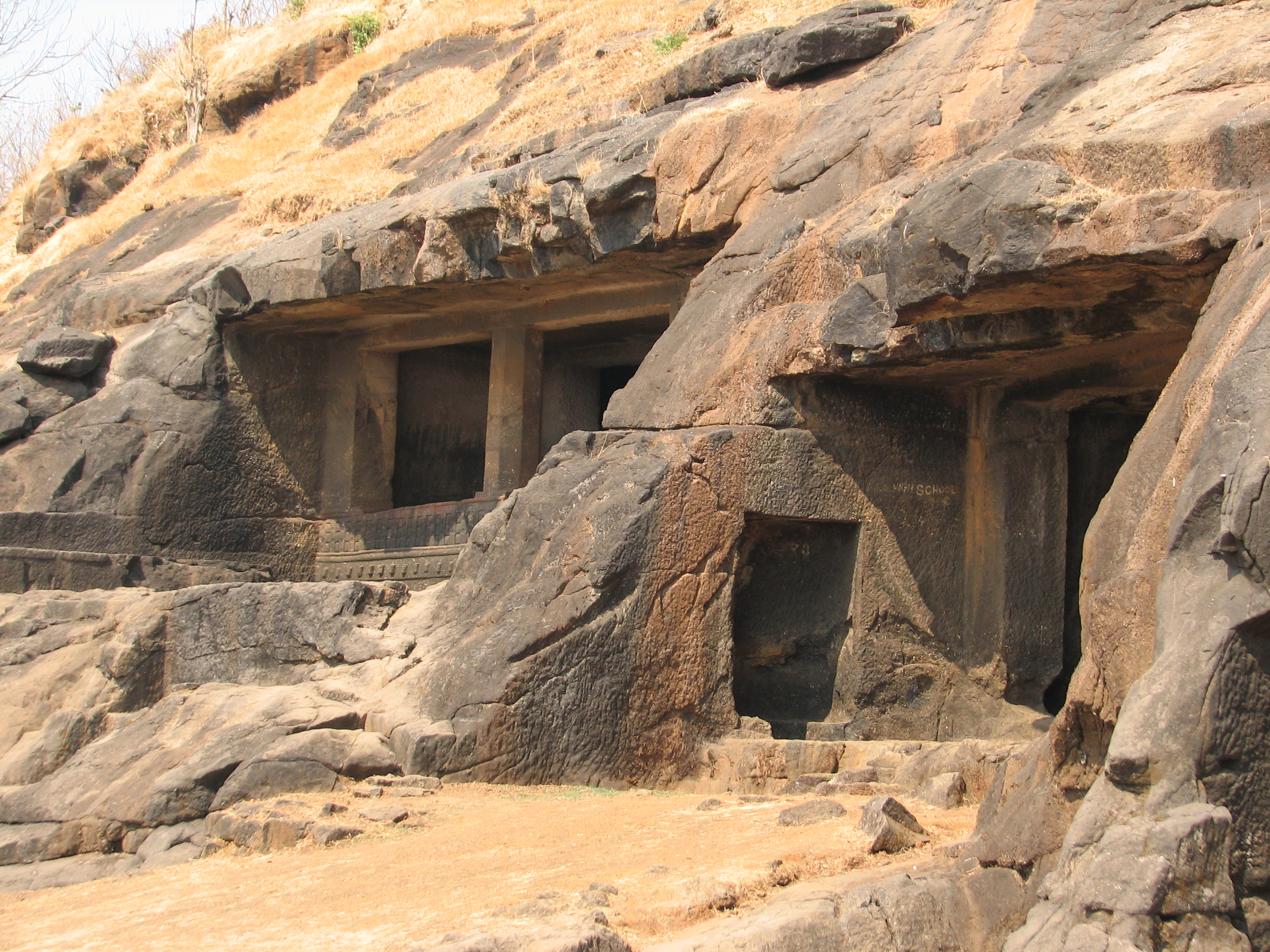
- Kuda Caves

- Location within India Location within Maharashtra
- Coordinates: 18.2850°N 73.0737°E

Kuda Caves are located in the small village of Kuda, on the eastern side of the north shore of Murud-Janjira in south Konkan, India. These fifteen Buddhist caves are small, simple, and were excavated in first century BCE.

The verandah of Chaitya has several reliefs of the Buddha, carved with symbols of lotus, wheel and Nagas. Later in 5th/6th century CE, the Buddhist branch of the Mahayana took over the caves and added their sculptures. The first cave has ancient writing on its wall. The sixth cave entrance is adorned with elephants.

The thirty inscriptions describe donations by lay Buddhists and Buddhist monks. Other donors include an iron monger, a banker, a gardener, a writer, physician, a flower vendor and a minister.

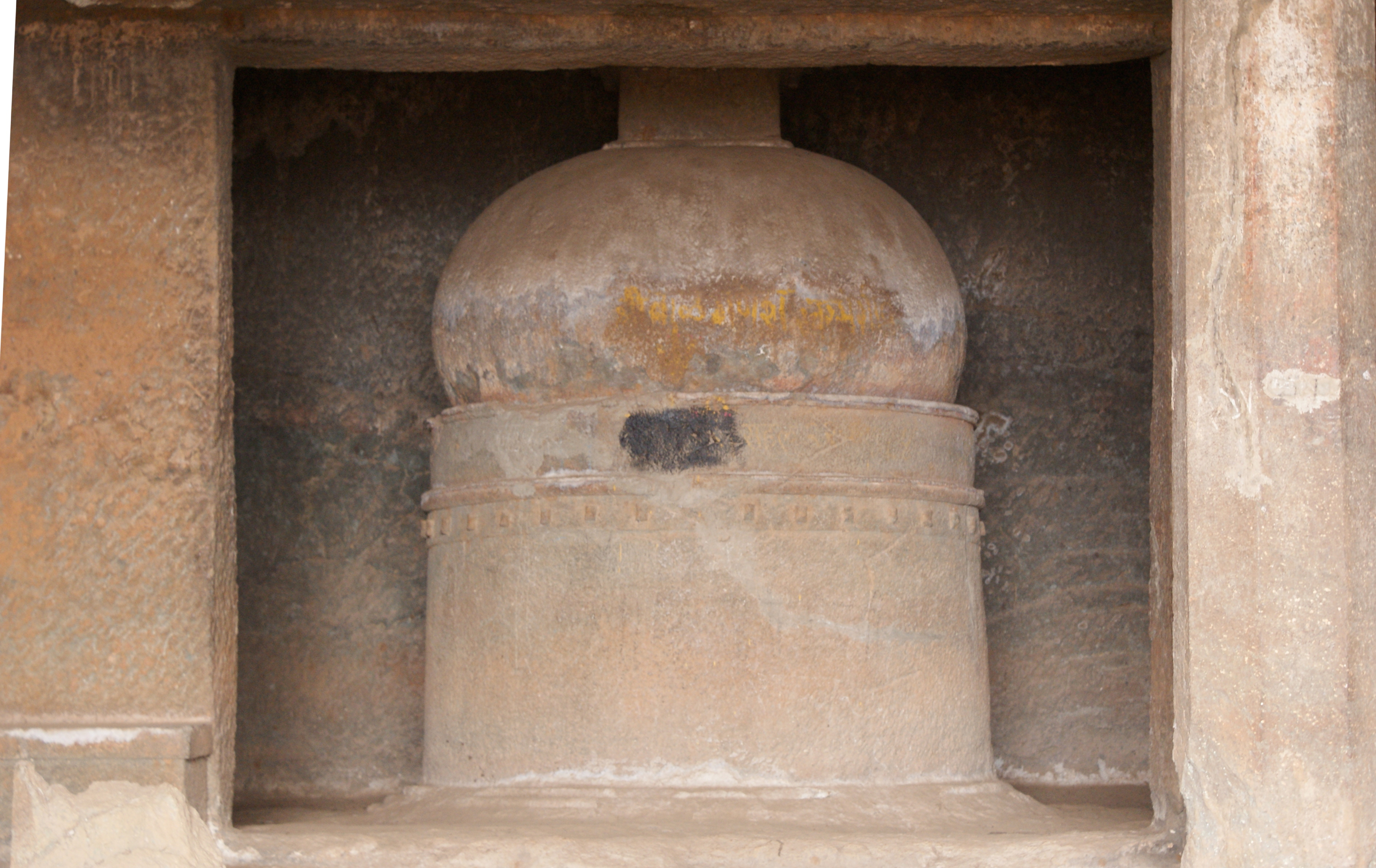
Stupa

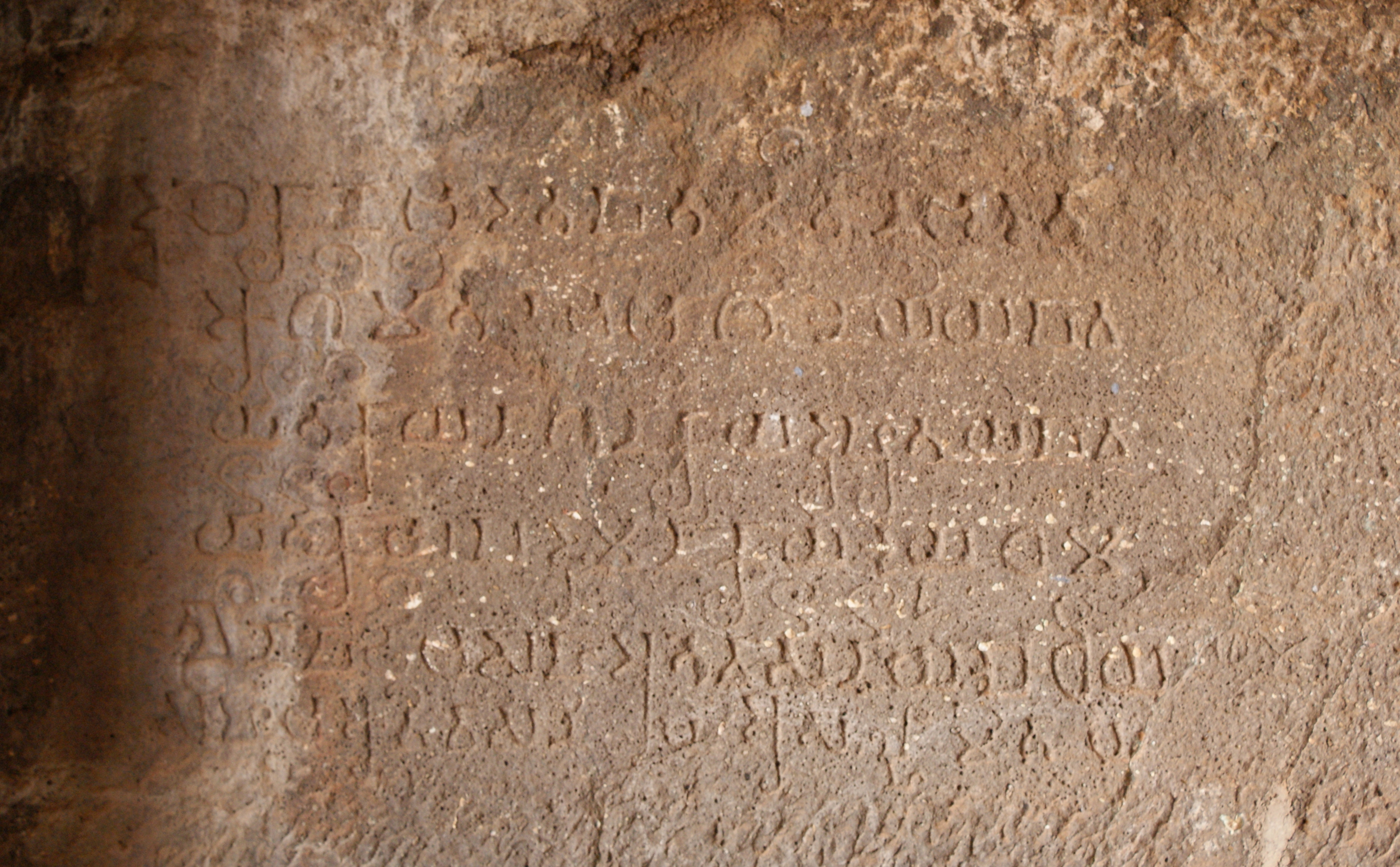
Inscription

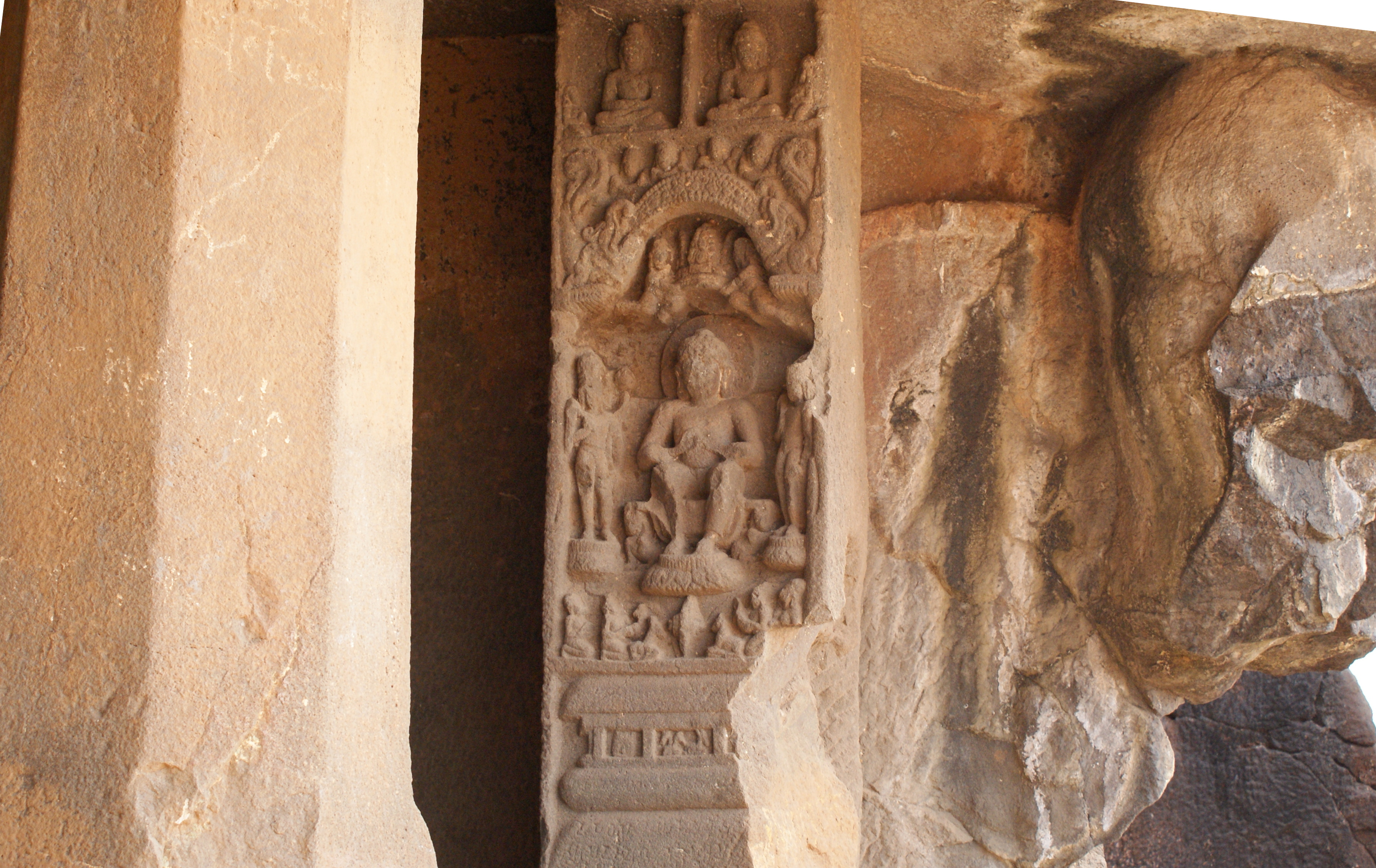
Reliefs

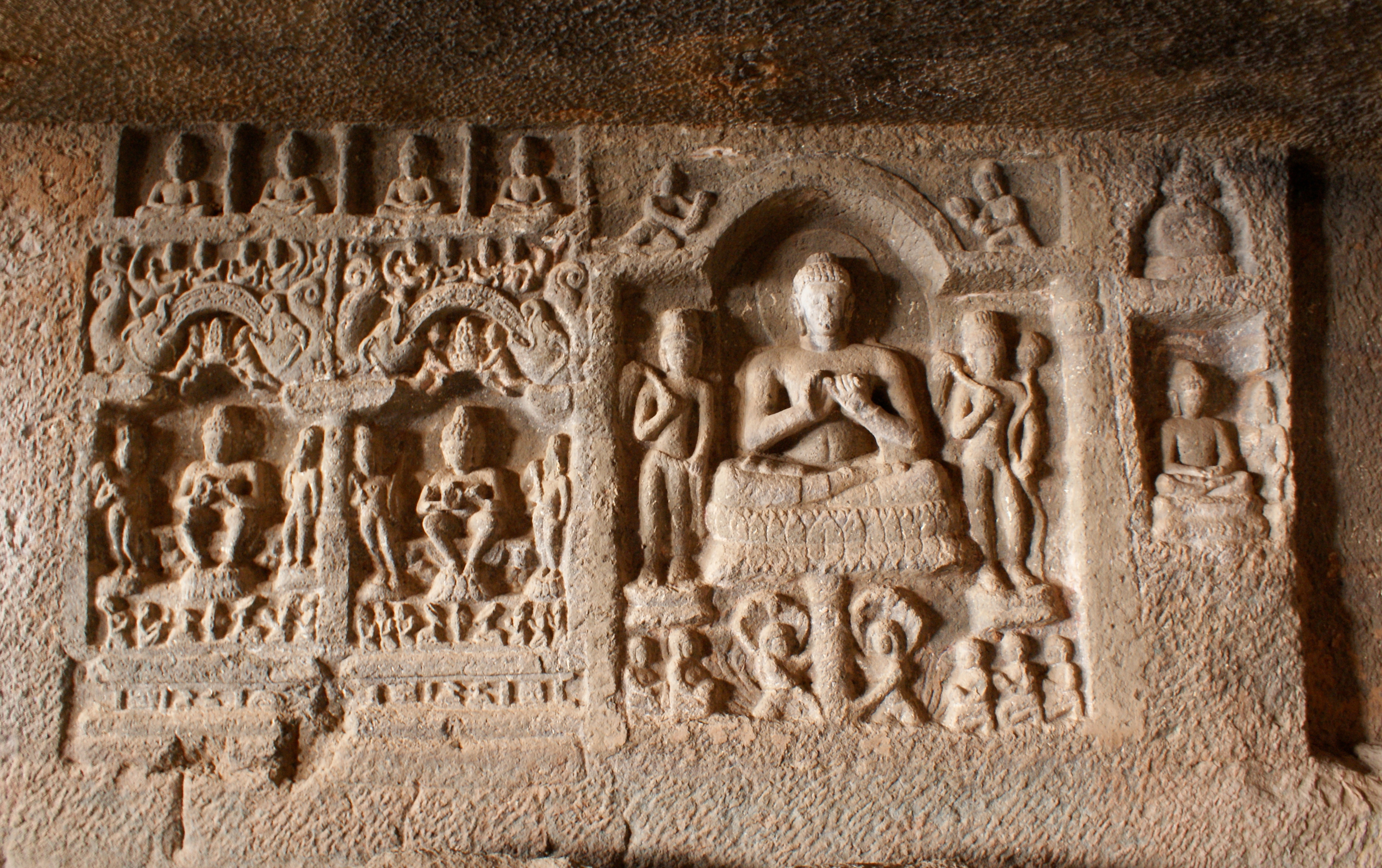
Reliefs

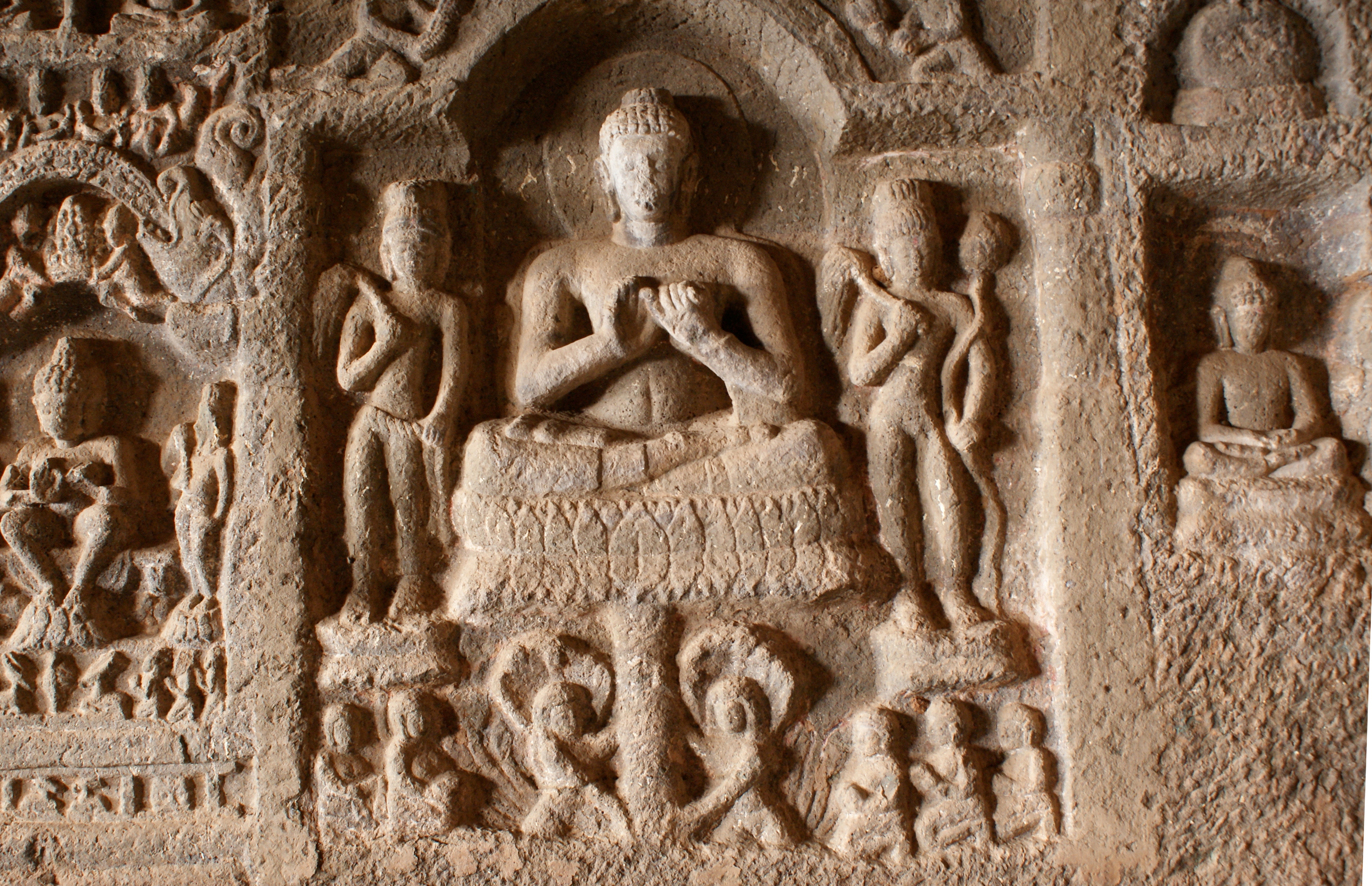
Reliefs

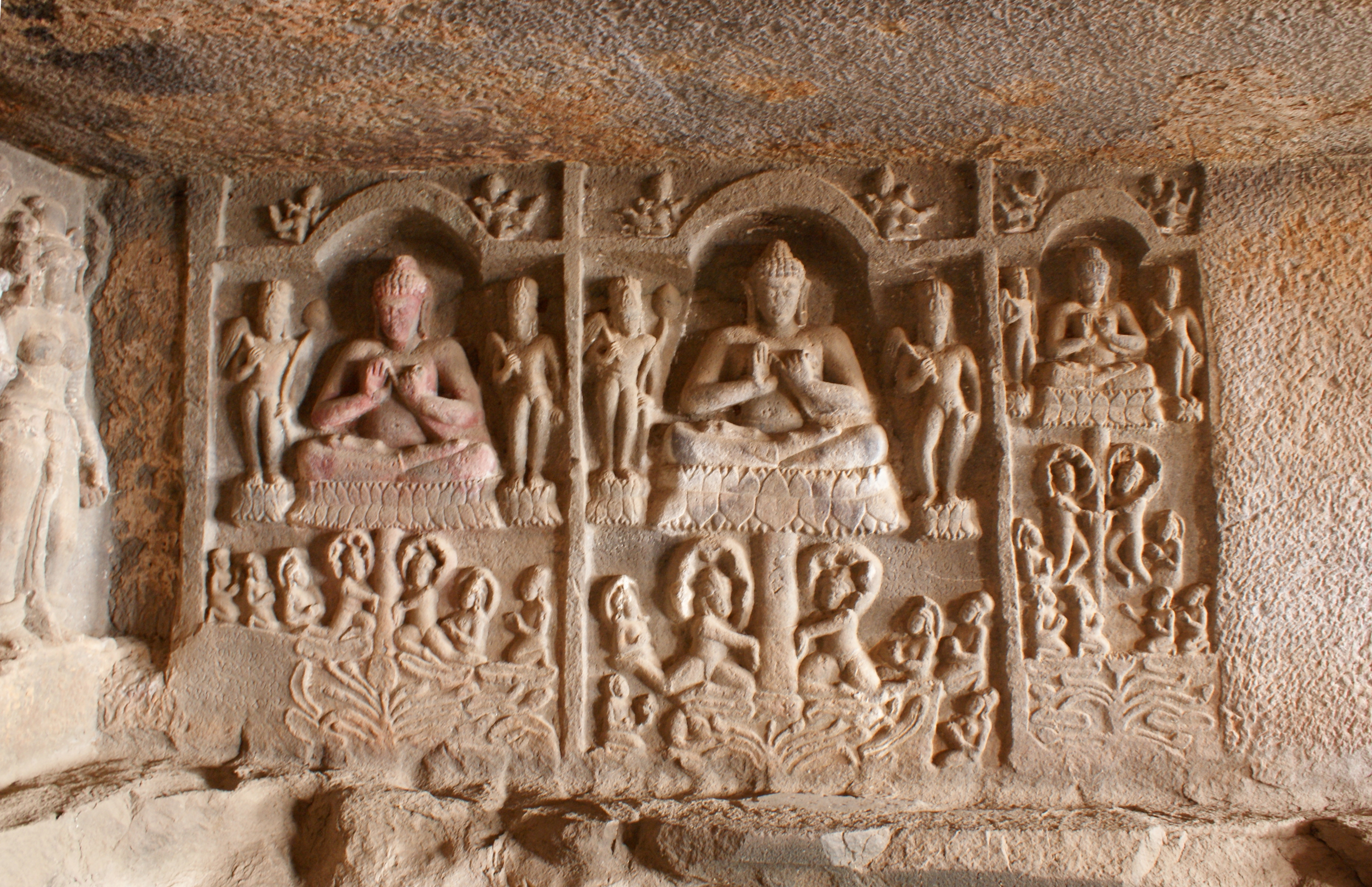
Reliefs

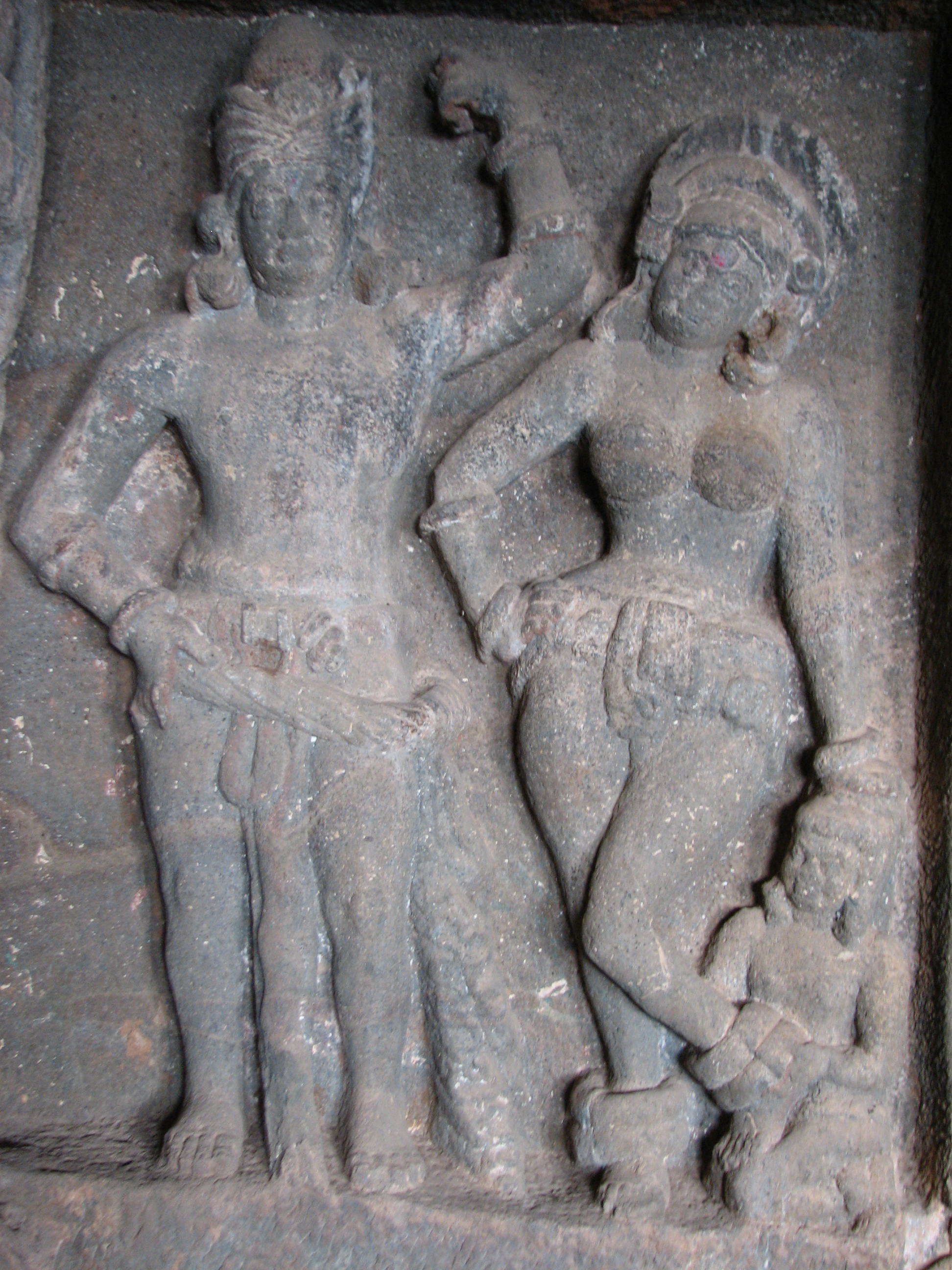
Reliefs

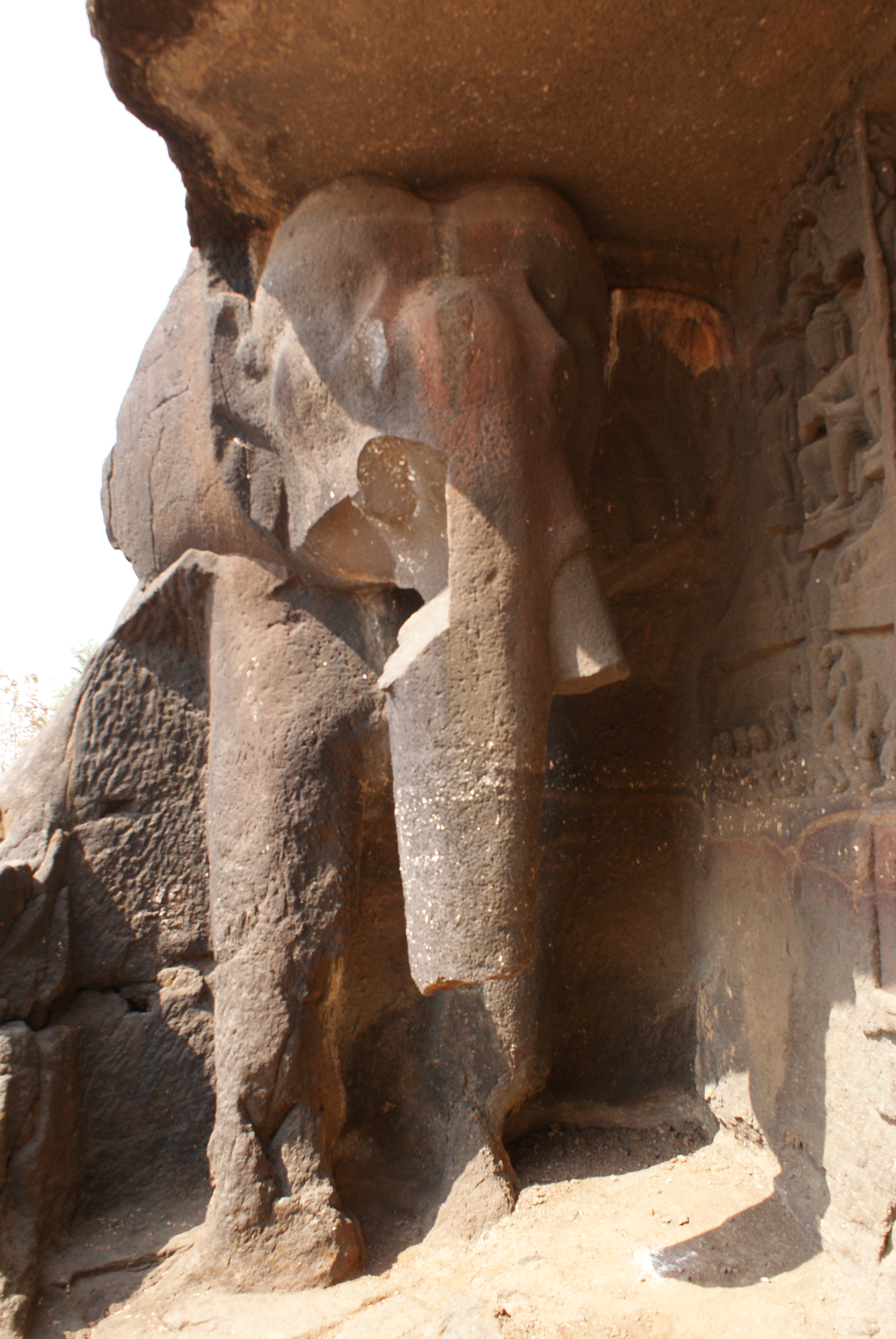
Guardian elephant

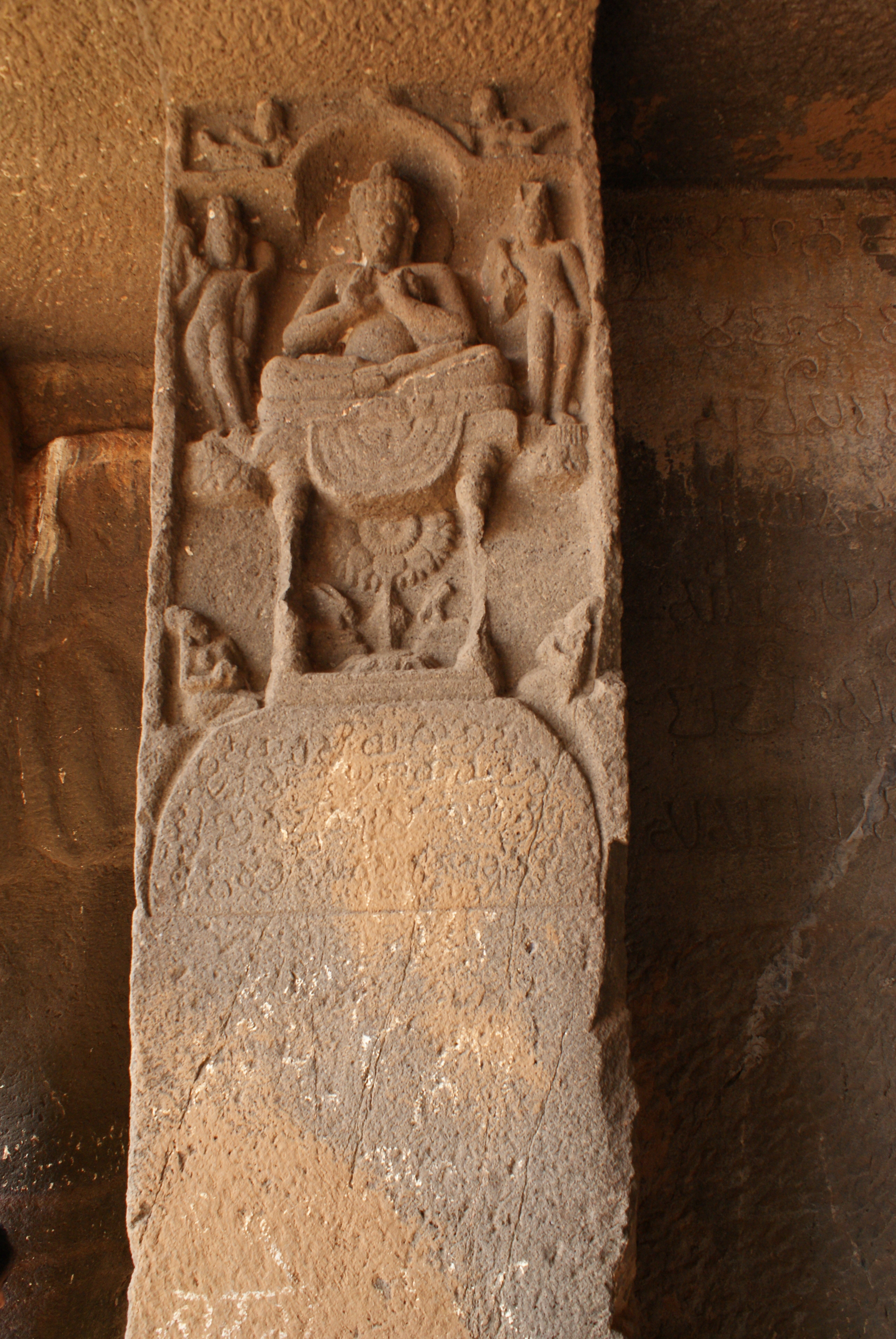

== Other websites ==
Media related to Kuda Caves at Wikimedia Commons
