= List of Monuments of National Importance in Aurangabad circle =

The ASI has recognized 286 Monuments of National Importance in Maharashtra. This list of has been split into three lists:

- List of Monuments of National Importance in Aurangabad circle
- List of monuments of national importance in Mumbai circle
- List of Monuments of National Importance in Nagpur circle

The following structures in Aurangabad circle of Maharashtra have been designated as Monuments of National Importance by the Archaeological Survey of India (ASI).

SL. No.	Description	Location	Address	District	Coordinates	Image
N-MH-A1	Damri Masjid	Ahilyanagar		Ahilyanagar	19°06′13″N 74°45′37″E	Damri Masjid More images
N-MH-A2	Gate near Niyamat Khan's Place	Ahilyanagar		Ahilyanagar	19°05′29″N 74°44′05″E	Upload Photo
N-MH-A3	Kotla of Twelve Imams	Ahilyanagar		Ahilyanagar	19°06′02″N 74°44′28″E	Kotla of Twelve Imams More images
N-MH-A4	Macca Masjid	Ahilyanagar		Ahilyanagar	19°05′56″N 74°44′27″E	Upload Photo
N-MH-A5	Old tomb near Changiz Khan's palace (Sarje Khan’s Tomb)	Ahilyanagar		Ahilyanagar	19°05′35″N 74°44′00″E	Upload Photo
N-MH-A6	Tomb of Nizam Ahmedshah	Ahilyanagar		Ahilyanagar	19°06′04″N 74°43′41″E	Tomb of Nizam Ahmedshah More images
N-MH-A7	Farah Bagh	Bhingar Cantonment		Ahilyanagar	19°04′06″N 74°45′08″E	Farah Bagh More images
N-MH-A8	Ancient sites and remains at Daimabad	Daimabad (Ladgaon)		Ahilyanagar	19°30′20″N 74°41′49″E	Upload Photo
N-MH-A9	Dhokeshvar Cave	Takali Dhokeshwar		Ahilyanagar	19°10′38″N 74°24′45″E	Dhokeshvar Cave More images
N-MH-A10	Jain Temple	Ghotan		Ahilyanagar	19°24′01″N 75°17′29″E	Jain Temple More images
N-MH-A11	Temple of Mallikarjuna	Ghotan		Ahilyanagar	19°24′02″N 75°17′32″E	Temple of Mallikarjuna More images
N-MH-A12	Caves and Temple	Harishchandragad		Ahilyanagar	19°23′31″N 73°46′46″E	Caves and Temple More images
N-MH-A13	Jarasangh Nagari	Jorwe		Ahilyanagar	19°32′39″N 74°16′53″E	Upload Photo
N-MH-A14	The temple of Malikarjuna	Karjat		Ahilyanagar	18°33′13″N 75°00′43″E	Upload Photo
N-MH-A15	Temple of Shiva called Naktichedeul	Karjat		Ahilyanagar	18°33′11″N 75°00′50″E	Upload Photo
N-MH-A16	Old Temple	Kokamthan		Ahilyanagar	19°51′51″N 74°31′17″E	Old Temple More images
N-MH-A17	Temple of Devi	Mandavagaon Katrabad		Ahilyanagar	18°49′48″N 74°49′39″E	Upload Photo
N-MH-A18	Salabatkhan's Tomb	Mohekari		Ahilyanagar	19°05′36″N 74°50′25″E	Salabatkhan's Tomb More images
N-MH-A19	Ancient site locally known as Ladmod	Nevasa		Ahilyanagar	19°33′00″N 74°55′06″E	Upload Photo
N-MH-A20	Temple of Shiva on the further side of the stream at Parner	Parner		Ahilyanagar	19°00′30″N 74°25′45″E	Upload Photo
N-MH-A21	Baleshwar Temple	Pedgaon		Ahilyanagar	18°30′29″N 74°42′14″E	Baleshwar Temple More images
N-MH-A22	The Temple of Lakshmi Narayan	Pedgaon		Ahilyanagar	18°30′28″N 74°42′16″E	The Temple of Lakshmi Narayan More images
N-MH-A23	Amruteshwar Temple	Ratanwadi		Ahilyanagar	19°31′04″N 73°43′23″E	Amruteshwar Temple More images
N-MH-A24	Hemadpanti Temple	SonaiBamini		Ahilyanagar	19°22′45″N 74°45′44″E	Upload Photo
N-MH-A25	Triple shrined temple of Bhavani	Tahakri		Ahilyanagar	19°38′50″N 73°56′06″E	Triple shrined temple of Bhavani More images
N-MH-A26	Five Stone Gates	Tisgaon		Ahilyanagar	19°11′20″N 75°04′16″E	Five Stone Gates More images
N-MH-A27	Temple of Devi	Toka		Ahilyanagar	19°37′21″N 75°00′54″E	Upload Photo
N-MH-A28	Temple of Siddeshwar Mahadev	Toka		Ahilyanagar	19°37′21″N 75°00′54″E	Temple of Siddeshwar Mahadev More images
N-MH-A29	Temple of Vishnu, and the five ghats attached thereto	Toka		Ahilyanagar	19°37′20″N 75°00′54″E	Upload Photo
N-MH-A30	Ajanta Caves	Ajanta		Chhatrapati Sambhajinagar	20°33′09″N 75°42′02″E	Ajanta Caves More images
N-MH-A31	Sambhajinagar Caves	Chhatrapati Sambhajinagar		Chhatrapati Sambhajinagar	19°55′01″N 75°18′43″E	Sambhajinagar Caves More images
N-MH-A32	Tomb of Rabia Daurani (Bibi-Ka-Maqbara)	Chhatrapati Sambhajinagar		Chhatrapati Sambhajinagar	19°54′06″N 75°19′13″E	Tomb of Rabia Daurani (Bibi-Ka-Maqbara) More images
N-MH-A33	Daulatabad Fort & Monument therein (i.e. Chand Minar)	Daulatabad		Chhatrapati Sambhajinagar	19°56′34″N 75°12′47″E	Daulatabad Fort & Monument therein (i.e. Chand Minar) More images
N-MH-A34	Ellora Caves	Ellora		Chhatrapati Sambhajinagar	20°01′35″N 75°10′45″E	Ellora Caves More images
N-MH-A35	Tomb of Aurangzeb	Khuldabad		Chhatrapati Sambhajinagar	20°00′18″N 75°11′29″E	Tomb of Aurangzeb
N-MH-A36	Tomb of Malik Ambar	Khuldabad		Chhatrapati Sambhajinagar	20°00′51″N 75°11′04″E	Tomb of Malik Ambar More images
N-MH-A37	Ancient Site / Mound	Paithan		Chhatrapati Sambhajinagar	19°27′49″N 75°22′56″E	Upload Photo
N-MH-A38	Pithalkhora Caves	Pithalkhora		Chhatrapati Sambhajinagar	20°18′49″N 74°59′33″E	Pithalkhora Caves More images
N-MH-A39	Ghrishneshwar Temple, chattries & other ancient sites	Verul (Ellora)		Chhatrapati Sambhajinagar	20°01′30″N 75°10′12″E	Ghrishneshwar Temple, chattries & other ancient sites More images
N-MH-A40	Ukkadeshwar Mahadev Temple	Ukkad Pimpri		Beed	19°06′24″N 75°36′47″E	Upload Photo
N-MH-A41	Math	Balsane		Dhule	21°10′17″N 74°29′30″E	Upload Photo
N-MH-A42	Small Temple on Survey No.141	Balsane		Dhule	21°10′13″N 74°29′27″E	Upload Photo
N-MH-A43	Temple of Durga	Balsane		Dhule	21°10′13″N 74°29′28″E	Temple of Durga More images
N-MH-A44	Temple of Shiva	Balsane		Dhule	21°10′05″N 74°29′32″E	Temple of Shiva More images
N-MH-A45	Temple of the left side of Shiva's Temple in Survey No. 418	Balsane		Dhule	21°10′05″N 74°29′32″E	Upload Photo
N-MH-A46	Temple in front of No.1 (Temple to the left side of Shiva's Temple) in Survey No. 418	Balsane		Dhule	21°10′05″N 74°29′31″E	Upload Photo
N-MH-A47	Temple between Durga's Temple and Math in Survey No. 141	Balsane		Dhule	21°10′13″N 74°29′27″E	Upload Photo
N-MH-A48	Old gateways in the ruined fort & caves	Bhamer		Dhule	21°04′14″N 74°20′09″E	Upload Photo
N-MH-A49	Seven Mohammedan Tombs	Thalner		Dhule	21°15′29″N 74°57′22″E	Upload Photo
N-MH-50	Three Mohammedan Tombs	Thalner		Dhule	21°15′31″N 74°57′24″E	Upload Photo
N-MH-A51	Ancient mound & monuments known as Pawar's Gadhi	Bahal		Jalgaon	20°35′25″N 75°02′55″E	Upload Photo
N-MH-A52	Temple of Changdev	Changdev		Jalgaon	21°05′31″N 76°00′22″E	Upload Photo
N-MH-A53	Temple of Devi & Sambha	Dighi		Jalgaon	20°28′54″N 75°10′44″E	Upload Photo
N-MH-A54	Maheswara Temple	Patana		Jalgaon	20°20′03″N 74°58′28″E	Maheswara Temple More images
N-MH-A55	Temple of Chandika Devi	Patana		Jalgaon	20°19′27″N 74°58′51″E	Temple of Chandika Devi More images
N-MH-A56	The temple of Nag-Arjun	Patana		Jalgaon	20°19′58″N 74°58′16″E	Upload Photo
N-MH-A57	The temple of Shringar Chavdi	Patana		Jalgaon	20°19′54″N 74°58′11″E	Upload Photo
N-MH-A58	Mahadev Temple	Sangameshwar		Jalgaon	20°34′29″N 75°12′02″E	Upload Photo
N-MH-A59	Ancient site and remains	Tekwada		Jalgaon	20°35′12″N 75°03′04″E	Upload Photo
N-MH-A60	Mudhai Devi Temple	Waghali		Jalgaon	20°30′09″N 75°05′42″E	Upload Photo
N-MH-A61	Old Temple of Siddheshwar with three inscriptions slabs	Waghali		Jalgaon	20°30′22″N 75°06′18″E	Upload Photo
N-MH-A62	Archaeological site & remains comprised in Survey plot No. 185	Bhokardan		Jalna	20°15′43″N 75°46′21″E	Upload Photo
N-MH-A63	Brahmanical caves known as Pandevlena	Mahoor village		Nanded	19°51′29″N 77°55′16″E	Brahmanical caves known as Pandevlena More images
N-MH-A64	Ancient site & remains	Prakasha		Nandurbar	21°30′28″N 74°21′31″E	Upload Photo
N-MH-A65	Hindu Temple	Ambegaon		Nashik	20°13′26″N 73°38′28″E	Upload Photo
N-MH-A66	Old Temple	Anjaneri		Nashik	19°56′48″N 73°35′22″E	Old Temple More images
N-MH-A67	Caves	Ankai		Nashik	20°11′15″N 74°27′13″E	Caves More images
N-MH-A68	Hindu Temple	Deothan		Nashik	19°58′52″N 74°40′13″E	Upload Photo
N-MH-A69	Old Matichi Gadhi	Nashik		Nashik	20°00′02″N 73°47′48″E	Upload Photo
N-MH-A70	Pandev Lena Caves	Pathardi		Nashik	19°56′28″N 73°44′55″E	Pandev Lena Caves More images
N-MH-A71	Temple of Aeshwar	Sinnar		Nashik	19°50′56″N 73°59′28″E	Upload Photo
N-MH-A72	Gondeshvar Temple of Mahadev	Sinnar		Nashik	19°51′05″N 74°00′07″E	Gondeshvar Temple of Mahadev More images
N-MH-A73	Trimbakeshwar Temple and adjoining Gayatri and Shiv Temples	Trimbak		Nashik	19°55′56″N 73°31′51″E	Trimbakeshwar Temple and adjoining Gayatri and Shiv Temples More images
N-MH-A74	Jaina Cave	Tringalwadi		Nashik	19°44′06″N 73°32′26″E	Jaina Cave More images
N-MH-A75	The Hemadpanti Temple of Mahdeo	Zodga		Nashik	20°39′28″N 74°40′25″E	Upload Photo

== See also ==
- List of monuments of national importance in Mumbai circle
- List of Monuments of National Importance in Nagpur circle
- List of State Protected Monuments in Maharashtra
- List of Monuments of National Importance in India
