= List of Monuments of National Importance in Maharashtra =

This is a list of Monuments of National Importance (ASI) as officially recognized by and available through the website of the Archaeological Survey of India in the Indian state Maharashtra. The monument identifier is a combination of the abbreviation of the subdivision of the list (state, ASI circle) and the numbering as published on the website of the ASI. 286 monuments of National Importance have been recognized by the ASI in Maharashtra.

Maharashtra is subdivided in three circles:

- Aurangabad circle
- Mumbai circle
- Nagpur circle

== See also ==
- List of Monuments of National Importance in India for other Monuments of National Importance in India
- List of State Protected Monuments in Maharashtra
