= 2560 =

2560 may refer to:

- 2017 in the Thai solar calendar
- 2016 in the Buddhist calendar
- Postcode for Leumeah, New South Wales

== See also ==
- 2560x1600
- 2560 BC
- 2560 Siegma
- Kusumba (Maharashtra), STD code 02560
