= Damri Masjid =

Former mosque in Ahmednagar, Maharashtra, India

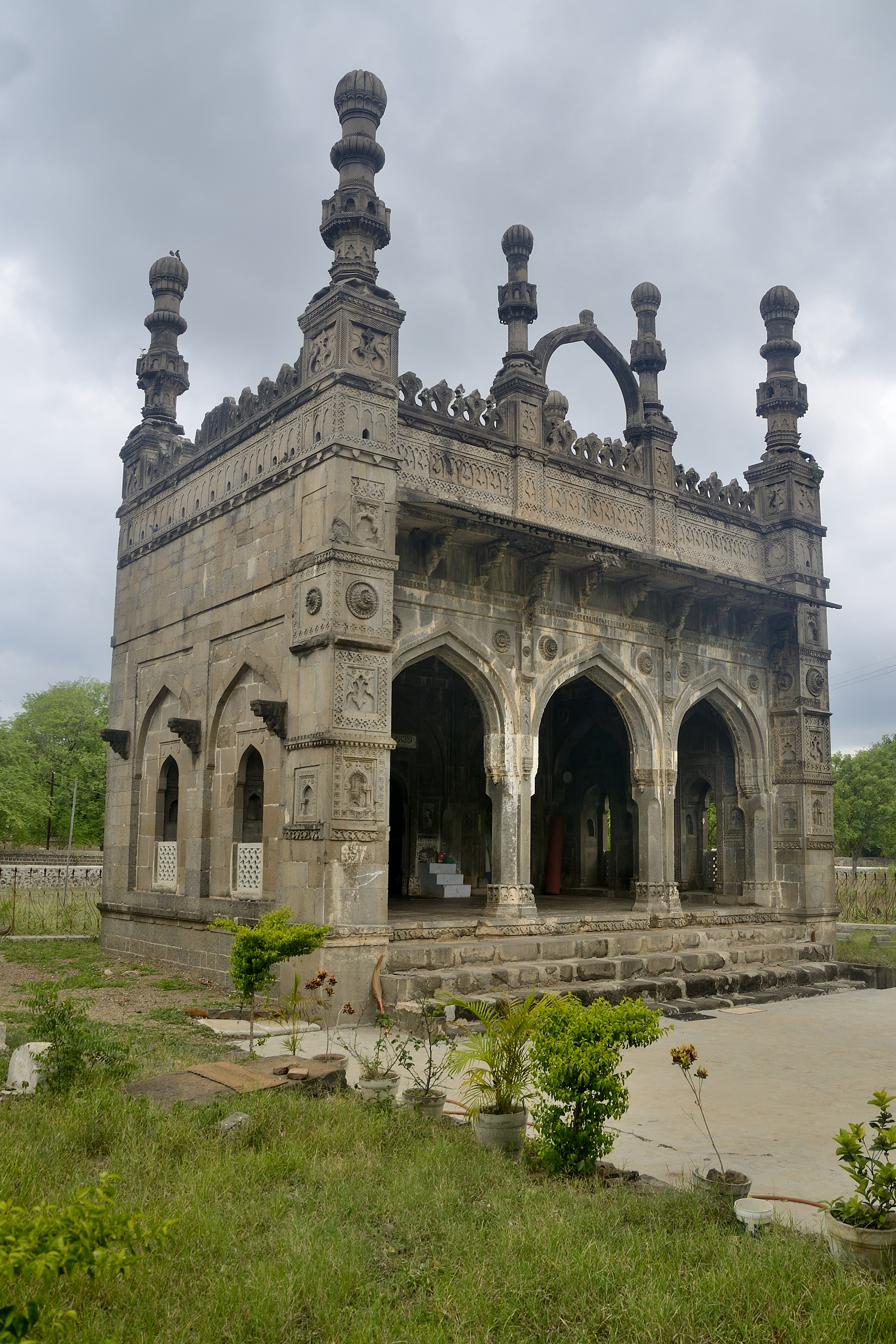
- The former mosque, in 2014

- Location of the former mosque in Maharashtra

Religion
- Affiliation: Islam (former)
- Ecclesiastical or organizational status: Mosque
- Status: Inactive (Partial ruinous state)

Location
- Location: Ahmednagar, Maharashtra
- Country: India
- Interactive map of Damri Masjid
- Administration: Archaeological Survey of India
- Coordinates: 19°06′14″N 74°45′37″E

Architecture
- Type: Mosque architecture
- Style: Indo-Islamic
- Founder: Sahir Khan, Ahmednagar Sultanate
- Completed: 1568 CE
- Minaret: Four

Monument of National Importance
- Official name: Damri Masjid
- Reference no.: N-MH-A1
- Location of the former mosque in Ahmednagar

The Damri Masjid, sometimes spelled as the Damdi Masjid, is a former mosque, in a partial ruinous state, located in Ahmednagar, in the state of Maharashtra, India. It was built during the reign of the Ahmednagar Sultanate in 1568 CE. The mosque is a Monument of National Importance, administered by the Archaeological Survey of India.

== History ==
Built by Sahir Khan, a nobleman of the Ahmednagar Sultanate, the former mosque was completed in 1568 CE. An apocryphal story about its naming states that Khan charged a levy of one damri from every worker who labored on the construction of the Ahmednagar Fort, and used the money thus collected to construct this mosque. Pushkar Sohoni argues that the craftsmanship of the mosque was too high-quality to be attributed to the patronage of common workmen.

== Architecture ==
The mosque façade has three pointed arches, which lead into the prayer hall. Square pylons are provided at all four corners of the building upon which rise slender minarets. The pylons are decorated with chakra-shaped moldings. Each of the minarets have ornamental galleries, and is topped with an orb.

The mosque is topped by a trefoil-patterned parapet wall. In the middle of the parapet are two finials, topped by octagonal pavilions and domed pinnacles. These are connected by a free-standing arch. The mosque's interior is divided into six bays.

== See also ==
- Islam in India
- List of mosques in India
- List of Monuments of National Importance in Aurangabad circle
