= List of Monuments of National Importance in Nagpur circle =

The ASI has recognized 286 Monuments of National Importance in Maharashtra. This list of has been split into three lists:

- List of Monuments of National Importance in Aurangabad circle
- List of monuments of national importance in Mumbai circle
- List of Monuments of National Importance in Nagpur circle

This is a list of Monuments of National Importance as officially recognized by the Archaeological Survey of India (ASI) in the Indian state of Maharashtra falling under the jurisdiction of its Nagpur (ASI circle).

SL. No.	Description	Location	Address	District	Coordinates	Image
N-MH-N1	The Dahihanda gate of outer city wall.	Akola		Akola	20°42′27″N 76°59′31″E	Upload Photo
N-MH-N2	The Khirki gate in the outer city wall	Akola		Akola	20°42′23″N 76°59′26″E	Upload Photo
N-MH-N3	The S.E. angle bastion of the outer city wall together with 10 years of the adjacent wall on each side. The bastion is situated some 100 yards to the east of No. (3) above, is variously known as Panch Burj and Burj Hasrath Yab and contains a Persian inscription	Akola		Akola	20°42′24″N 76°59′30″E	The S.E. angle bastion of the outer city wall together with 10 years of the adjacent wall on each side. The bastion is situated some 100 yards to the east of No. (3) above, is variously known as Panch Burj and Burj Hasrath Yab and contains a Persian inscription More images
N-MH-N4	Fort at Narnala: i. Shahanur Gateway, ii. Mahakali Gateway, iii. Mendha Gateway, iv. Akot Gateway, v. Delhi Gateway, vi. Sirpur Gateway, vii. Small Mosque, viii. The Large & Two smaller Guns, ix. the tank built to contain Oil & Ghee, x. Ambar Mahal	Akot		Akola	21°14′10″N 77°01′24″E	Fort at Narnala: i. Shahanur Gateway, ii. Mahakali Gateway, iii. Mendha Gateway, iv. Akot Gateway, v. Delhi Gateway, vi. Sirpur Gateway, vii. Small Mosque, viii. The Large & Two smaller Guns, ix. the tank built to contain Oil & Ghee, x. Ambar Mahal More images
N-MH-N5	Balapur fort	Balapur		Akola	20°40′13″N 76°46′26″E	Balapur fort More images
N-MH-N6	Chhatri near the Dak Bungalow	Balapur		Akola	20°39′32″N 76°46′45″E	Chhatri near the Dak Bungalow More images
N-MH-N7	Black stone temple of Bhawani	Barsi Takli		Akola	20°34′37″N 77°04′19″E	Upload Photo
N-MH-N8	Two caves	Patur		Akola	20°27′57″N 76°56′01″E	Two caves
N-MH-N9	Tank in front of top tomb of Lalkhan	Amner		Amaravati	21°23′05″N 78°24′11″E	Upload Photo
N-MH-N10	Tomb of Lalkhan	Amner		Amaravati	21°23′05″N 78°24′10″E	Upload Photo
N-MH-N11	Gawilgarh Fort (The walls & the whole area contained by them)	Chikhaldara		Amaravati	21°23′01″N 77°20′05″E	Gawilgarh Fort (The walls & the whole area contained by them) More images
N-MH-N12	City wall of Nawab Ismail Khan	Ellichpur (Achalpur)		Amaravati	21°15′57″N 77°30′38″E	City wall of Nawab Ismail Khan More images
N-MH-N13	Dula Gate	Ellichpur (Achalpur)		Amaravati	21°15′49″N 77°30′40″E	Dula Gate More images
N-MH-N14	Haripura Gate	Ellichpur (Achalpur)		Amaravati	21°15′11″N 77°30′41″E	Upload Photo
N-MH-N15	Hauz Katora	Ellichpur (Achalpur)		Amaravati	21°14′40″N 77°28′57″E	Hauz Katora More images
N-MH-N16	Jiwanpura Gate	Ellichpur (Achalpur)		Amaravati	21°15′24″N 77°31′03″E	Upload Photo
N-MH-N17	Temple of Anandeshwar	Lasur	Lasur, Tehsil Daryapur	Amaravati	20°51′50″N 77°14′06″E	Temple of Anandeshwar More images
N-MH-N18	All the remains of the circumambulation wall of Pauni Fort	Pauni		Bhandara	20°47′15″N 79°38′01″E	All the remains of the circumambulation wall of Pauni Fort More images
N-MH-N19	Ancient mounds situated to the south-east of the fort immediately beyond the moat outside on which a modern temple of Jagannath stands	Pauni		Bhandara	20°47′00″N 79°38′07″E	Upload Photo
N-MH-N20	Mound known as Hardulala-ki-Tekri	Pauni		Bhandara	20°47′40″N 79°37′26″E	Upload Photo
N-MH-N21	Cromlesh known as 'Tillota' (Frying Pan)	Pimpalgaon		Bhandara	20°53′05″N 79°44′05″E	Upload Photo
N-MH-N22	Moti Samadhi	Deulgaon Raja		Buldhana	20°00′33″N 76°02′56″E	Upload Photo
N-MH-N23	Three old Temples	Dhotra		Buldhana	20°06′22″N 76°13′26″E	Upload Photo
N-MH-N24	Mosque	Fathekheda (Sakharkheda)		Buldhana	20°12′20″N 76°23′52″E	Upload Photo
N-MH-N25	Two old Temple	Kothali		Buldhana	20°38′20″N 76°15′50″E	Upload Photo
N-MH-N26	Dharmasala on the west of the town which is partially ruined and locally called Chhatra	Lonar		Buldhana	19°59′12″N 76°31′00″E	Upload Photo
N-MH-N27	Fifteen Temples on the way down to the lake and situated around it	Lonar		Buldhana	19°58′58″N 76°30′45″E	Upload Photo
N-MH-N28	Gaimukha Temple & Tank	Lonar		Buldhana	19°59′09″N 76°30′52″E	Gaimukha Temple & Tank More images
N-MH-N29	Gaimukha Temple No 1 of Daitya Sudana	Lonar		Buldhana	19°59′09″N 76°30′51″E	Upload Photo
N-MH-N30	Square Kunda on the East of the Town	Lonar		Buldhana	19°58′52″N 76°31′27″E	Upload Photo
N-MH-N31	Old temple of Daityasudana	Lonar		Buldhana	19°59′01″N 76°31′11″E	Old temple of Daityasudana More images
N-MH-N32	Old Dharmasala at North-West corner of the town	Mehkar		Buldhana	20°09′14″N 76°33′57″E	Upload Photo
N-MH-N33	Mosque	Rohinkhed		Buldhana	20°37′47″N 76°07′46″E	Mosque More images
N-MH-N34	Old Temple of Mahadev	Sakegaon		Buldhana	20°20′47″N 76°10′16″E	Upload Photo
N-MH-N35	Old Temple of Vishnu, remains of an old building to the east of that temple and remains of a small temple	Satgaon		Buldhana	20°23′53″N 76°12′59″E	Upload Photo
N-MH-N36	Lakhuji Jadhavrao's Samadhi	Sindhkhed Raja		Buldhana	19°57′07″N 76°07′17″E	Upload Photo
N-MH-N37	Tank	Sindhkhed Raja		Buldhana	19°57′31″N 76°07′09″E	Upload Photo
N-MH-N38	Temple of Mahadeva	Sindhkhed Raja		Buldhana	19°57′06″N 76°07′19″E	Upload Photo
N-MH-N39	Fort Wall	Ballarpur		Chandrapur	19°51′04″N 79°20′28″E	Upload Photo
N-MH-N40	Fort at Bhandak	Bhandak		Chandrapur	20°06′25″N 79°06′41″E	Fort at Bhandak
N-MH-N41	A large high knoll immediately to the east of Bhadranath temple with remains of a temple, with huge stone carved blocks & a figure of Ganapati	Bhandak		Chandrapur	20°06′00″N 79°06′47″E	Upload Photo
N-MH-N42	Vijasan Caves - Pandavas caves containing three images	Bhandak	Vijasan, Bhadravati	Chandrapur	20°05′50″N 79°05′53″E	Vijasan Caves - Pandavas caves containing three images More images
N-MH-N43	Walled enclosure outside the Anchaleshver temple and another small temple within the enclosure	Chandrapur		Chandrapur	19°56′46″N 79°18′11″E	Walled enclosure outside the Anchaleshver temple and another small temple within the enclosure More images
N-MH-N44	The enclosure & buildings of the Gond Raja's Tomb just outside the Anchaleshwar gate the city	Chandrapur		Chandrapur	19°56′46″N 79°18′11″E	The enclosure & buildings of the Gond Raja's Tomb just outside the Anchaleshwar gate the city More images
N-MH-N45	Fort Wall	Chandrapur		Chandrapur	19°56′40″N 79°18′05″E	Fort Wall More images
N-MH-N46	Lalpeth monoliths consisting of the sixteen colosal stone images. i. Anna Purna, ii. Tortoise, iii. Fish, iv. Snake, v. Hanuman, vi. Hanuman, vii. Ganpati, viii. Ganpati, ix. Mahadeo, x. Kali, xi. Bhim, xii. Rawan, xiii. Nandi, xiv. Mahadeo, xv. Ganga, xvi. Ganga, xvi. Ganga	Chandrapur		Chandrapur	19°55′50″N 79°18′21″E	Lalpeth monoliths consisting of the sixteen colosal stone images. i. Anna Purna, ii. Tortoise, iii. Fish, iv. Snake, v. Hanuman, vi. Hanuman, vii. Ganpati, viii. Ganpati, ix. Mahadeo, x. Kali, xi. Bhim, xii. Rawan, xiii. Nandi, xiv. Mahadeo, xv. Ganga, xvi. Ganga, xvi. Ganga More images
N-MH-N47	Mahadeo Temple close to the Municipal office	Chandrapur		Chandrapur	19°56′45″N 79°17′49″E	Upload Photo
N-MH-N48	Temple of the Mahakali	Chandrapur		Chandrapur	19°56′34″N 79°18′14″E	Upload Photo
N-MH-N49	A temple of Keshavanath built in the Hemadpanti style	Churul		Chandrapur	19°59′46″N 79°45′07″E	Upload Photo
N-MH-N50	Ancient Temple	Deotek		Chandrapur	20°36′28″N 79°44′13″E	Upload Photo
N-MH-N51	Hemadpanthi Temple containing images of Dattatraya, Mahadev & Laxminarayan	Dhanora		Chandrapur	19°54′45″N 79°10′46″E	Upload Photo
N-MH-N52	Old Bridge at Ghutakala	Ghutakala-Raiyatwari (Bhandak)		Chandrapur	20°06′16″N 79°07′15″E	Upload Photo
N-MH-N53	Old Temple of Chandikadevi	Ghutakala-Raiyatwari (Bhandak)		Chandrapur	20°06′15″N 79°07′01″E	Upload Photo
N-MH-N54	Remains of an old Fort	Khatora		Chandrapur	20°16′43″N 79°20′10″E	Upload Photo
N-MH-N55	Mahadeo’s Temple (Hemadpanti)	Mahadwari		Chandrapur	20°24′42″N 79°29′20″E	Upload Photo
N-MH-N56	Temple of Mahadeo	Neri		Chandrapur	20°28′05″N 79°26′41″E	Temple of Mahadeo More images
N-MH-N57	Ramdigi temple & Ramdigi pool	Nimdhela Forest		Chandrapur	20°25′41″N 79°14′56″E	Upload Photo
N-MH-N58	Old Hemadpanthi Temple	Palebaras		Chandrapur	20°15′41″N 79°52′29″E	Upload Photo
N-MH-N59	An Old Temple of Mahadeo of the style of Markanda Temple	Rajgarh		Chandrapur	20°02′25″N 79°44′26″E	Upload Photo
N-MH-N60	Shiva Temple	Armori		Gadchiroli	20°27′48″N 79°58′52″E	Shiva Temple More images
N-MH-N61	Stone Circle	Arsoda		Gadchiroli	20°28′56″N 79°57′50″E	Upload Photo
N-MH-N62	A group of twenty cromlechs or Kistvaens	Chamurshi		Gadchiroli	19°57′19″N 79°53′05″E	Upload Photo
N-MH-N63	Rock Caves	Jharapara		Gadchiroli	20°04′23″N 80°30′15″E	Upload Photo
N-MH-N64	Group of Temples	Markanda		Gadchiroli	19°59′40″N 79°51′59″E	Group of Temples More images
N-MH-N65	Fortress of Tipagarh situated on the summit of mountain region	Murumgaon Zamindari		Gadchiroli	20°28′53″N 80°32′02″E	Upload Photo
N-MH-N66	Two temples (one small and one large) which are closely situated	Thanegaon		Gadchiroli	20°25′16″N 79°59′51″E	Two temples (one small and one large) which are closely situated More images
N-MH-N67	Fort wall	Wairagarh		Gadchiroli	20°25′54″N 80°05′33″E	Fort wall More images
N-MH-N68	Temple of Bhandareshwar	Wairagarh		Gadchiroli	20°25′34″N 80°05′06″E	Temple of Bhandareshwar More images
N-MH-N69	Area containing the old remains of two temples consisting of a collection of massive stones in two separate heaps, One immediately outside Padampur to the north & the other immediately to the south of Ganeshpur	Padampur		Gondia	21°21′15″N 80°24′01″E	Upload Photo
N-MH-N70	Remains of the temple to the North of the Village	Padampur		Gondia	21°21′25″N 80°23′35″E	Upload Photo
N-MH-N71	Remains of the temple to the North-west of the village	Padampur		Gondia	21°21′21″N 80°23′51″E	Upload Photo
N-MH-N72	Remains of the temple close to the south of the village Ganeshpur	Padampur		Gondia	21°21′31″N 80°23′35″E	Upload Photo
N-MH-N73	Remains of the temple locally known as Nath Bawa	Padampur		Gondia	21°21′18″N 80°23′36″E	Upload Photo
N-MH-N74	Fort at Pratapgad	Pratapgarh		Gondia	20°49′25″N 80°05′13″E	Upload Photo
N-MH-N75	Fort on the bank of the river, said to have been built by Jatba, one of the Gond kings	Bhiwagarh		Nagpur	21°28′57″N 79°10′11″E	Fort on the bank of the river, said to have been built by Jatba, one of the Gond kings More images
N-MH-N76	Fort at the bottom of the hill	Donagartal		Nagpur	21°36′15″N 79°20′56″E	Fort at the bottom of the hill More images
N-MH-N77	Temple	Ghogra		Nagpur	21°17′49″N 78°24′18″E	Upload Photo
N-MH-N78	Stone Circle	Ghorar		Nagpur	21°15′00″N 78°53′03″E	Upload Photo
N-MH-N79	Stone Circle	Junapani	Near Fetari, down MH SH 248.	Nagpur	21°11′49″N 78°59′56″E	Stone Circle More images
N-MH-N80	Ancient Buddhist remains comprising monastery, stupas, Rock-cut inscription etc.	Mansar & Kahari		Nagpur	21°23′47″N 79°16′41″E	Ancient Buddhist remains comprising monastery, stupas, Rock-cut inscription etc. More images
N-MH-N81	Old High Court Building	Nagpur		Nagpur	21°09′14″N 79°04′16″E	Upload Photo
N-MH-N82	Stone circle	Nildho		Nagpur		Upload Photo
N-MH-N83	Kalimata's Temple	Ramtek		Nagpur	21°24′03″N 79°20′06″E	Kalimata's Temple More images
N-MH-N84	The remains of a very old shrines upon the western ridge at the end of the Ramtek hill overlooking the town between the group of temples and the bungalow. The shrine consists simply of a portion of porch of a temple and the mutilated image of the Trivikram Avatara of Vishnu	Ramtek		Nagpur	21°23′56″N 79°20′10″E	The remains of a very old shrines upon the western ridge at the end of the Ramtek hill overlooking the town between the group of temples and the bungalow. The shrine consists simply of a portion of porch of a temple and the mutilated image of the Trivikram Avatara of Vishnu More images
N-MH-N85	The tank and Mandapa opposite to the Dattatraya's Temple	Ramtek		Nagpur	21°23′52″N 79°20′06″E	The tank and Mandapa opposite to the Dattatraya's Temple More images
N-MH-N86	Stone Circle	Takalghat		Nagpur		Upload Photo
N-MH-N87	Fort	Paunar		Wardha	20°47′04″N 78°40′26″E	Fort More images
N-MH-N88	Hemadpanti Temple of Mahadeo known by name Someshwar	Neir		Yavatmal	20°29′18″N 77°51′59″E	Upload Photo
N-MH-N89	Temple of Goddess Pandhardevi	Pandhardevi		Yavatmal	20°06′54″N 78°39′19″E	Upload Photo
N-MH-N90	Temple of Kamaleshwar	Pathrot		Yavatmal	20°13′04″N 77°54′20″E	Upload Photo
N-MH-N91	Mahadeo’s Temple	Rant Swangi		Yavatmal	20°34′28″N 78°16′03″E	Upload Photo
N-MH-N92	Mahadeo’s Temple	Rui-Wai		Yavatmal	20°10′10″N 78°03′33″E	Upload Photo
N-MH-N93	Hemadpanthi Temple of Shree Mahadev (Taponeshwar)	Tapona		Yavatmal	20°20′43″N 77°53′18″E	Upload Photo
N-MH-N94	Mahadeo’s Temple	Yelabara		Yavatmal	20°14′24″N 78°18′55″E	Upload Photo

== See also ==
- List of State Protected Monuments in Maharashtra
- List of Monuments of National Importance in India
