= Kusumba (Maharashtra) =

Village in Maharashtra

Kusumba Ner-Kusumba
- village
- Location in Amhara sutra uu, India Kusumba (India)
- Coordinates: 20°55′N 74°39′E
- Country: India
- State: Maharashtra
- Region: West India
- Division: Nashik Division
- District: Dhule

Population (2001)
  - Total: 8,774

Languages
  - Official: Marathi
- Time zone: UTC+5:30 (IST)
- PIN: 424302
- Telephone code: 02560
- ISO 3166 code: IN-MH
- Nearest city: Dhule
- Literacy: 70%
- Distance from Dhule: 20 kilometres (12 mi) North (Road)

Kusumba is a small village in the state of Maharashtra, India. It is located in the Dhule taluka of Dhule District in Maharashtra at dhule- sakri road on Gujarat-Nagpur highway.

== Location ==
Kusumba village is located on the riverbank side of river Panzra. National Highway number 6 (NH-6) which starts from West End Hajira (Gujarat) and ends to East End Kolkata (West Bengal) passes through Kusumba Village. The distance of Kusumba village from Dhule city is about 18 km.

== History ==
The old Kusumba village was located on the river bank of river Panzra which was lost due to the flood that occurred to Panzra river during the years 1864–65. After that the village was relocated to some distance from the river bank and the newly situated village is the current Kusumba Village. The architectural structure of Kusumba village has a cross line road (rach road meets every another road at 90 degrees) like Haddppa Sanskruti designed by Sir Mokshagundam Visvesvaraya. There is a very beautiful hemadpanthi temple of Kalambeshwar (God Shiva) Near by Panzra river which is very old.

== Climate ==
Kusumba has three distinct seasons during the year: summer, winter, and the rainy season.

=== Temperature ===
The average annual maximum temperature is variable between 30 and 37 degrees Celsius and the average annual minimum is 20 degrees Celsius. March, April, May, and June are summer months in which climate is hot. May and June are the hottest months. In these months, sometimes temperature goes beyond 40 degrees Celsius. Dusty and hot winds of medium velocity are common during summer months. Winter is starts from October to February, when the temperature drops down to minimum of 20 degrees Celsius. Sometimes it drops up to 10–15 degrees Celsius.

=== Rainfall ===
Rainy season starts by mid-June and lasts till September. The nearest rain gauge station is at Dhule.

Kusumba once faced water scarcity in 1972.

=== Humidity ===
The air is dry during the rest of the year. the humidity is generally about 70% in the monsoon season while in summer season the relative humidity is about 20% at noon.

=== Cloudiness ===
The weather is heavily clouded during monsoon season.

== Attractions ==
Kusumba is one of the major villages in Dhule district in Maharashtra State, and has a diverse population. The primary School is Two Name is Z.P School No-1 & Z.P School No-2 & Sambhaji English School in Kusumba. Industry is agriculture although there are two colleges, Aadarsh Mahavidyalaya Jr & Sr College & ITI, and M.K. Shinde Jr. College. Kusumba vartapatra is the weekly newspaper published from kusumba since 2010. The weekly day of bazaar for Kusumba village is Wednesday to where peoples from other villages also come to buy daily use things, vegetables and fruits, clothes. People from village speaks languages like Marathi, Hindi, Ahirani, Gujarati. Mangi-Tungi peaks which are holy-places to Jain peoples are near from the Kusumba Village. The Akkalpada Dam which will provide water to agricultural land as well as for drinking purpose when fully get constructed is also near to the Kusumba Village.

== People ==
=== Dress ===
Dressing style in Kusumba village is very similar to other villages in Maharashtra. the dress of men, is of two parts/pieces, the one covering upper part above waist and the other covering lower part below waist. The dress pattern and the styles differ slightly in men from community to community and the change is more apparent in women. The men wear kurta or sadra that covers the upper part above waist. The elderly men wear Dhoti/Dhotar. Dhotar is white long cloth of generally 4 meters length and 1.2 m width and worn below waist. Dhotar is typical attire that is wound and tied around the waist with knot of its corner; which certainly requires initial practice. the elderly men from villages wear cap mostly known as Gandhi Topi which is made from khadi. The younger generation wear shirts, trouser and pajamas or pants. The shirt is locally called kurta or sadra.

Women across all castes wear saadi/saari and blouse. Saadis are available in 2 types as the one with 9 yard length and the other with 6 yards length. The elderly women of old generation prefer 9-yard saadis; whereas the younger generation prefers 6-yard saadis.

=== Jewellery and ornaments ===
Glass bangles are worn as ornaments by women of all communities. Ornaments of gold and silver are also worn by women which are from rich families. The duplicate jewellery similar to gold available at cheap prices are also worn by people which are economically poor.

== Transportation ==
=== Rail ===
There is no provision of train from Kusumba village to any other place as the railway route is not developed yet, but there is travel by MSRT buses as well as through private buses. For the train, anyone must go to Dhule city so that from Dhule trains are available for various destinations.

=== Road ===
All buses traveling from Dhule-Navapur/Sakri/Surat/Ahemdabad and from Navapur/Sakri/Surat/Ahemdabad-Dhule make a stop at Kusumba village. Daily buses and private cabs are available from Kusumba to Dhule/Sakri.

=== Air ===
Kusumba has no airport of its own, the closest airport is at Dhule.

== Temple/Church/Mosque/Gurdwara ==
There is a very beautiful Beespanthi Digambar Jain mandir of Mulnayak Kunthunath Bhagawan hemadpanthi temple of Kalmbeshwar (Shiva) Near by Panzra river which is very old. Also in the village, people constructed Ram Mandir (Temple of lord Rama)& Sai Baba Temple and swami samarth math near bus stop, Malegaon road and Hanuman Temple called as [Par] in local language Gujarat high way no 6.Kusumba. There is no church and Gurudwara in Kusumba Village.

== Festival ==
The festivals celebrated by the village people are Ganesh Festival, Navaratri, Diwali, Dasara (Vijayadashami), Rama Navami, Lalit Raksha-Bandhan, Kanbai, Dhanya and Ramjan Id (Eid ul-Fitr).

== See also ==
- List of villages in Dhule District
- List of districts of Maharashtra
- Dhule District
- Maharashtra
