= Amruteshwar Temple =

- अमृतेश्वर
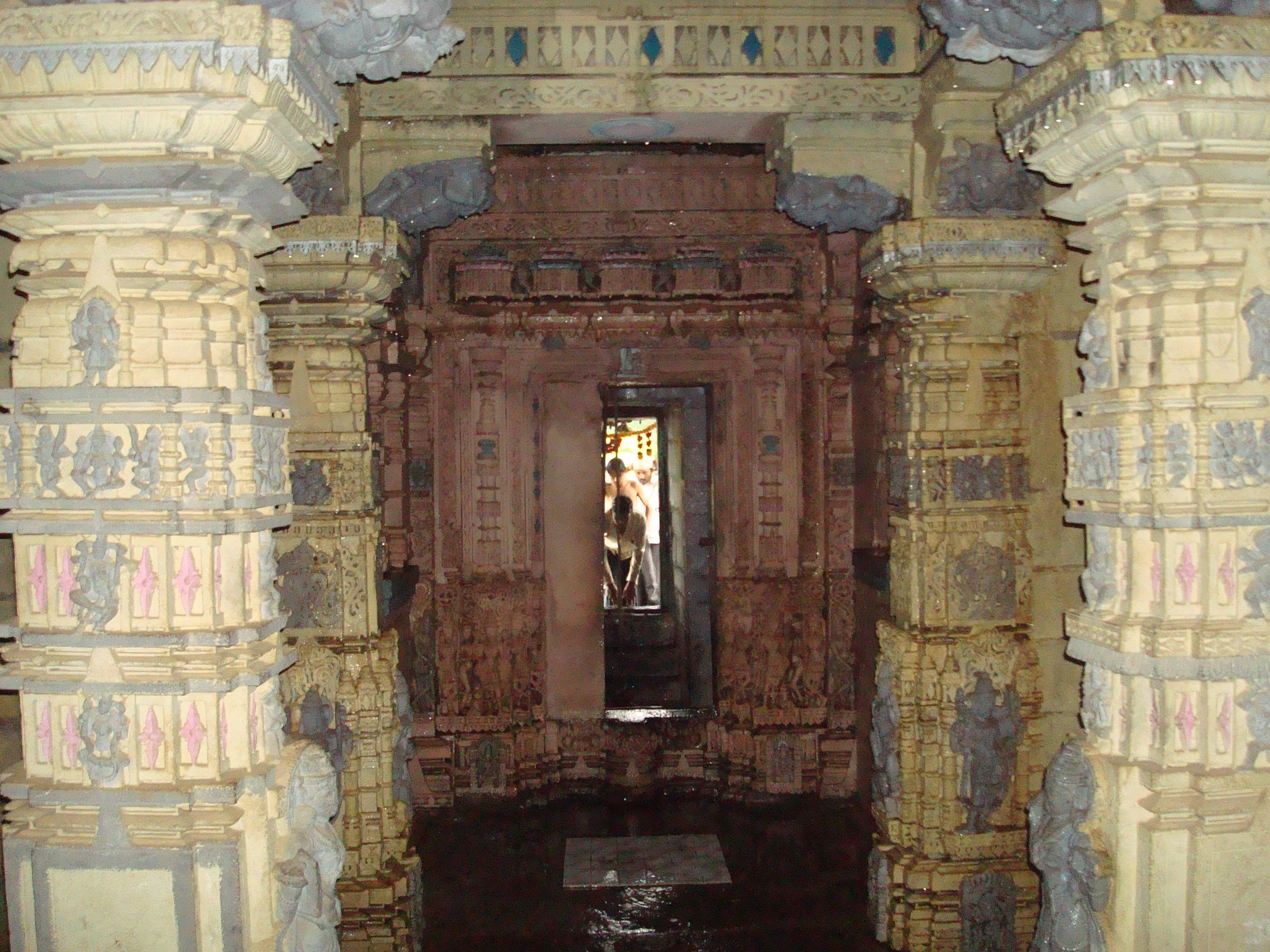
- Amruteshwar (Maharashtra, India)

- Location in Maharashtra

Religion
- Affiliation: Hinduism
- District: Ahmednagar
- Deity: Amruteshwar (Shiva)
- Festival: Mahashivratri

Location
- Location: Ratanwadi
- State: Maharashtra
- Country: India
- Interactive map of Amruteshwar Temple
- Coordinates: 19.5177359°N 73.7229797°E

Architecture
- Type: Hemadpanti architecture
- Creator: King Jhanjha of Shilahara dynasty
- Completed: 9th Century CE

Amruteshwar Temple is an intricately carved Shiva temple in Ratanwadi. It is over 1200 years old and was built by the rulers of Shilahara dynasty in the 9th century CE. This is one of twelve Shiva temples built by King Jhanjha. It measures 61mX36m and is surrounded by a low parapet with an entrance towards the east. On plan it consists of the mandapa, with an antarala and garbhagriha on the east of it, and a porch before the eastern back door of the shrine. The temple faces west and is dedicated to Shiva; the lingam installed in the shrine is peculiar; it consists of a yoni which is placed over a cavity in the rock and over it in the shape of kalasha are three stones kept one over the other. The Nandi is placed on the western gate facing the backdoor of the shrine, i.e. east; apart from this, there are two other eroded nandis on the porch. Perforated windows can be seen in the shallow recesses of the mandapa.

The shikhara over the shrine is intact and is very ornamental, while the roof of the mandapa has disappeared leaving the inner lintels of the ceiling. The ceiling at places where the original roof slabs are missing is filled in with Hero stones, undressed stones and other architectural members at a later period. The shikhara has four vertical spires with diminishing miniature shikharas capped with a flat amalaka. The walls are decorated with geometrical patterns but are devoid of images. The pillars are carved and consist of a square base over which an octagonal member is topped by a circle.

A stepped tank locally known as pushkarani, square on plan, was also provided near the temple, with stepped entrances from three directions and a number of subsidiary shrines in niches around it. The images in the niches are of Ganesha and different forms of Vishnu like those of Sheshayi, Madhava and others.

Archaeological Survey of India declared it a monument of national importance.
