= Farah Bagh =

1583 palace in Maharashtra, India

Coordinates: 19.068279°N 74.752016°E

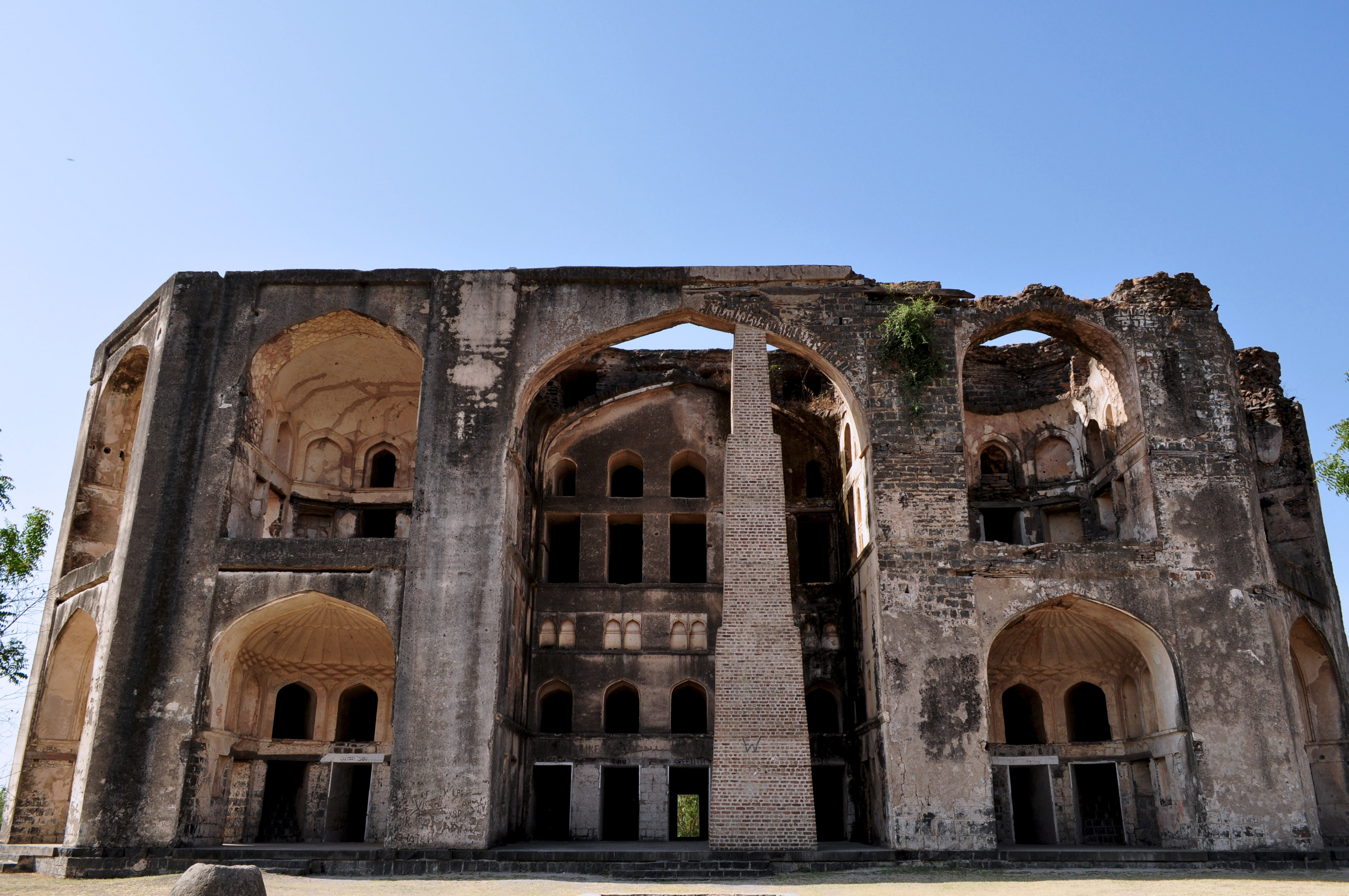

- Location within Maharashtra
- Location: Ahmednagar, Maharashtra

History
- Built: 1583
- Built for: Ahmadnagar Sultanate

Site notes
- Architectural style: Indo-Islamic architecture

Farah Bagh (also called as Faria Bagh) is situated in Ahmednagar, Maharashtra. It is a palace build by Nizam Shahi rulers in Ahmednagar.

== History ==
Farah Bagh was the centrepiece of a huge palatial complex completed in 1583. It was the special possession of the royal household and Murtaza Nizam Shah I often retired here to play chess with a Delhi singer whom he called Fateh Shah and also built for him a separate mahal called Lakad Mahal in the garden.

== Architecture ==
The central eight-sided palace is now in ruins and except an embankment no signs of the pond remains. Between this garden and the city are seventy domes and forty mosques said to have contained the tombs of many of the royal favorites.

== Gallery ==
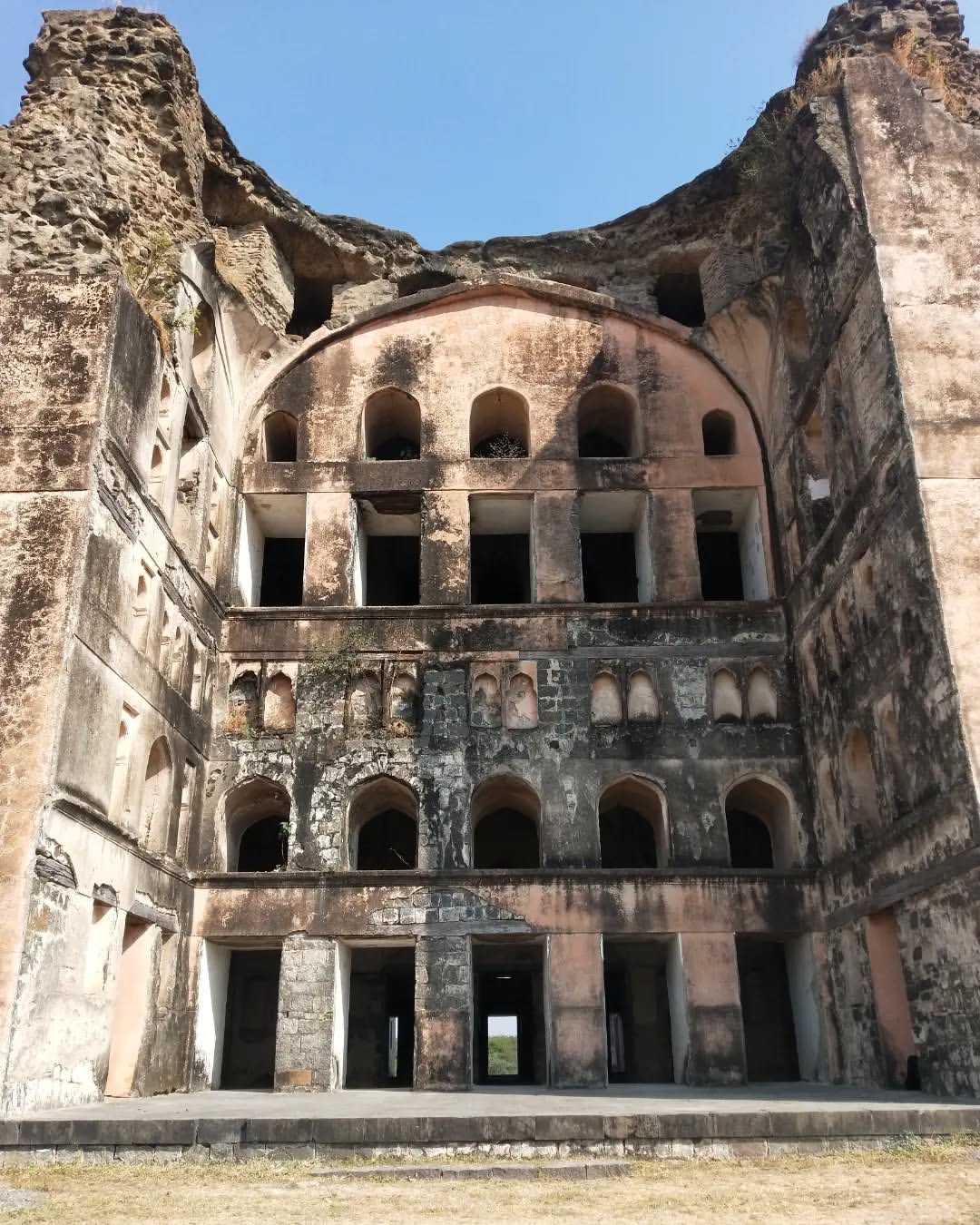
View of the palace from the side

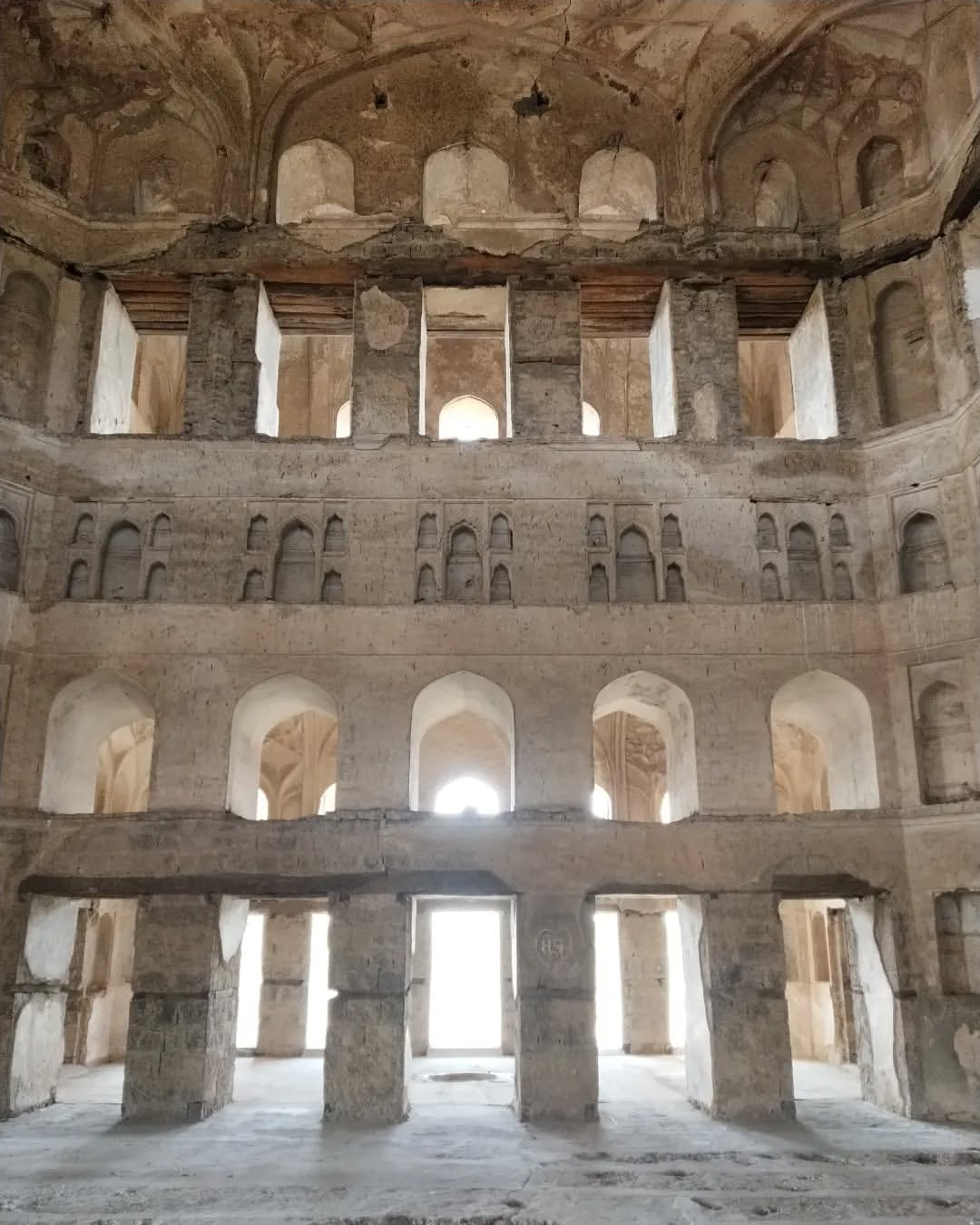
The interior

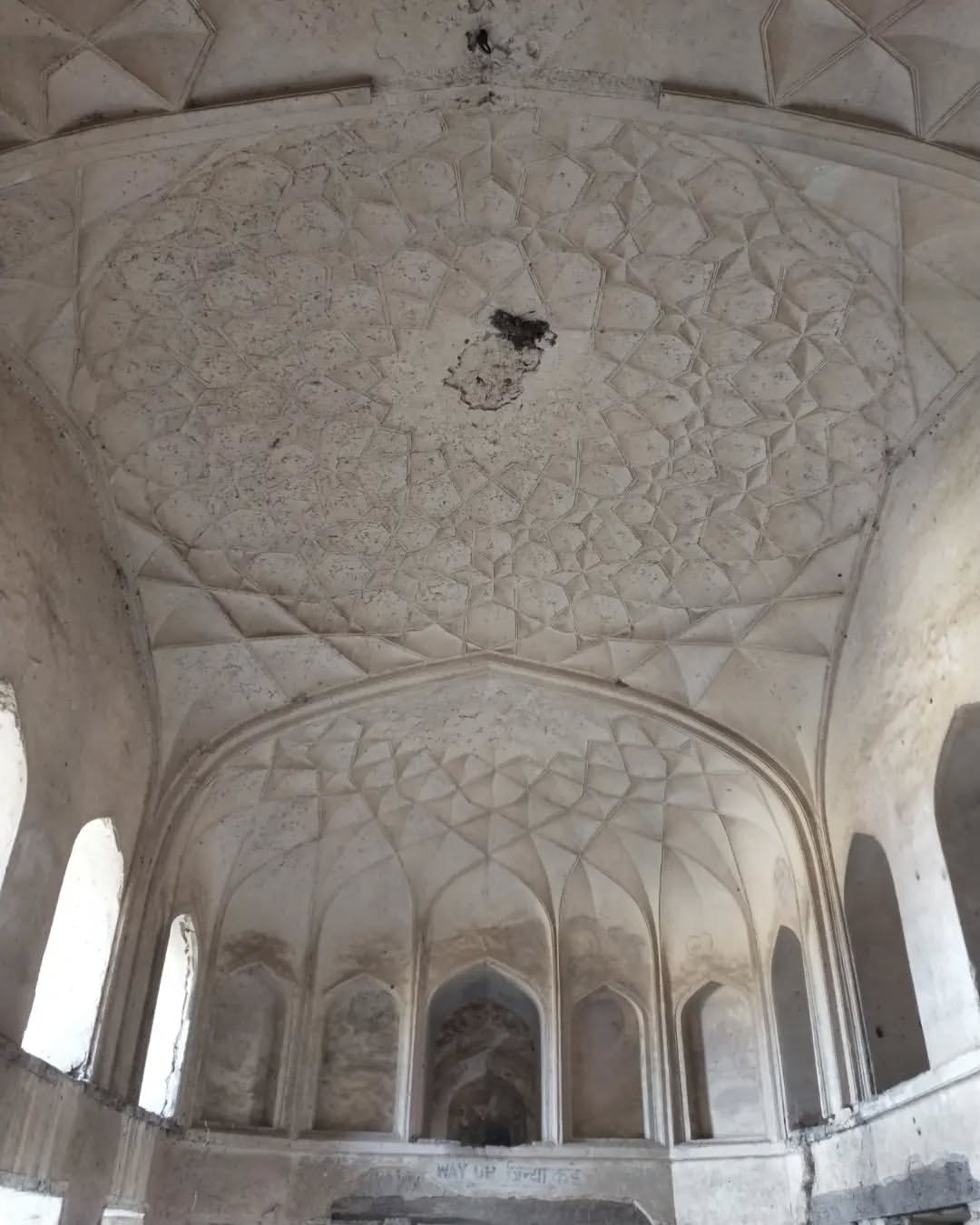
The ceiling

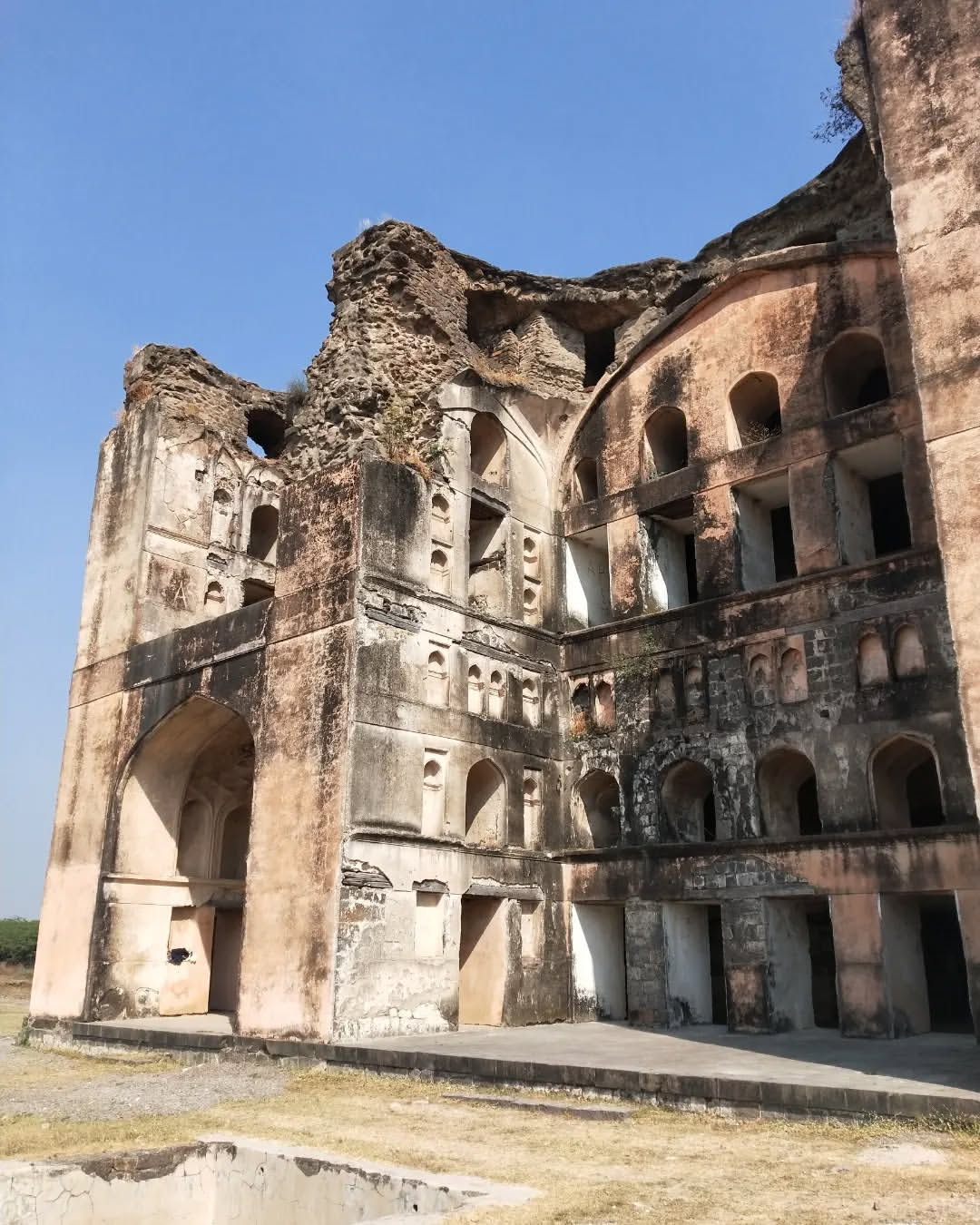

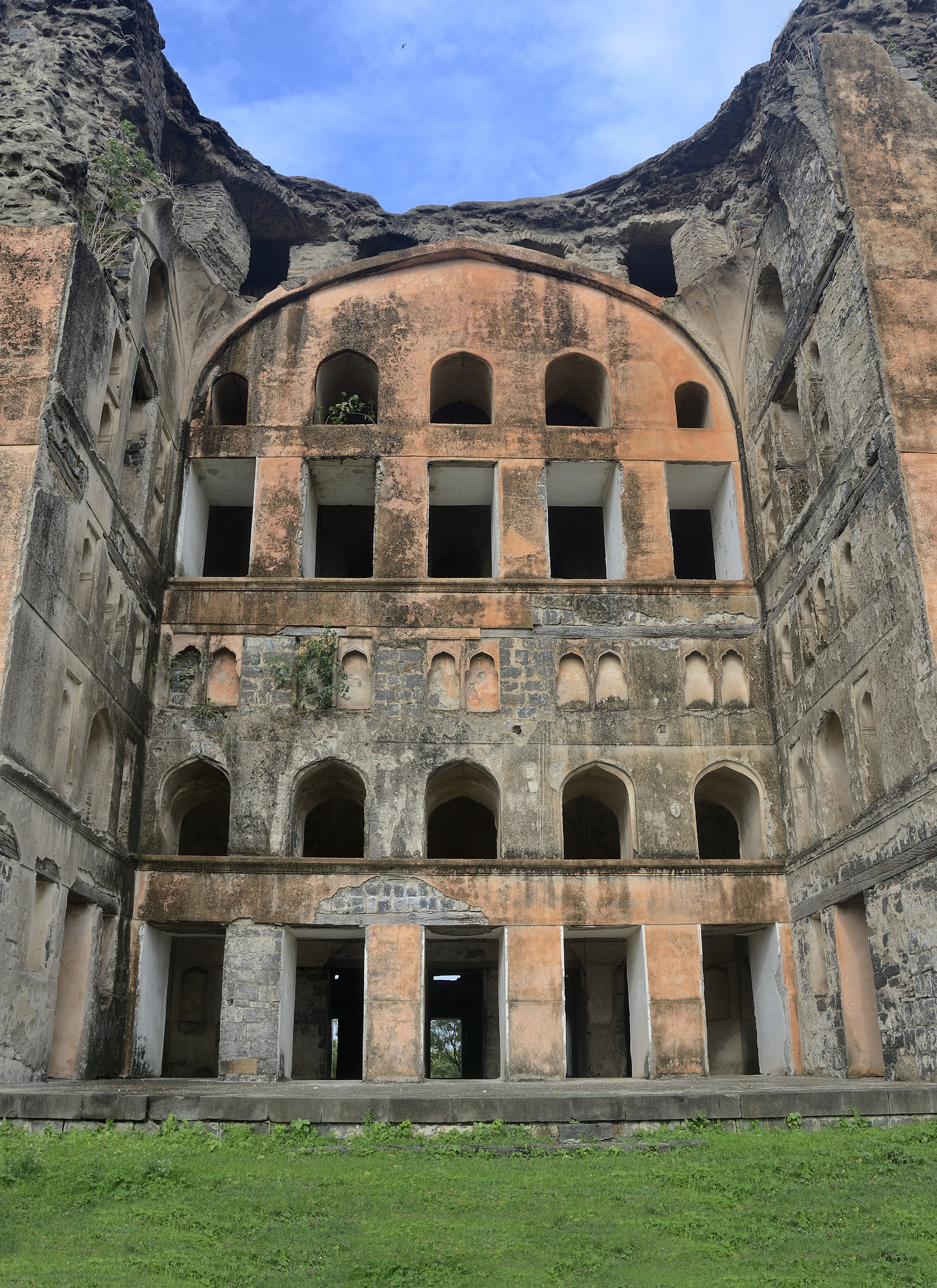
Farah Bagh

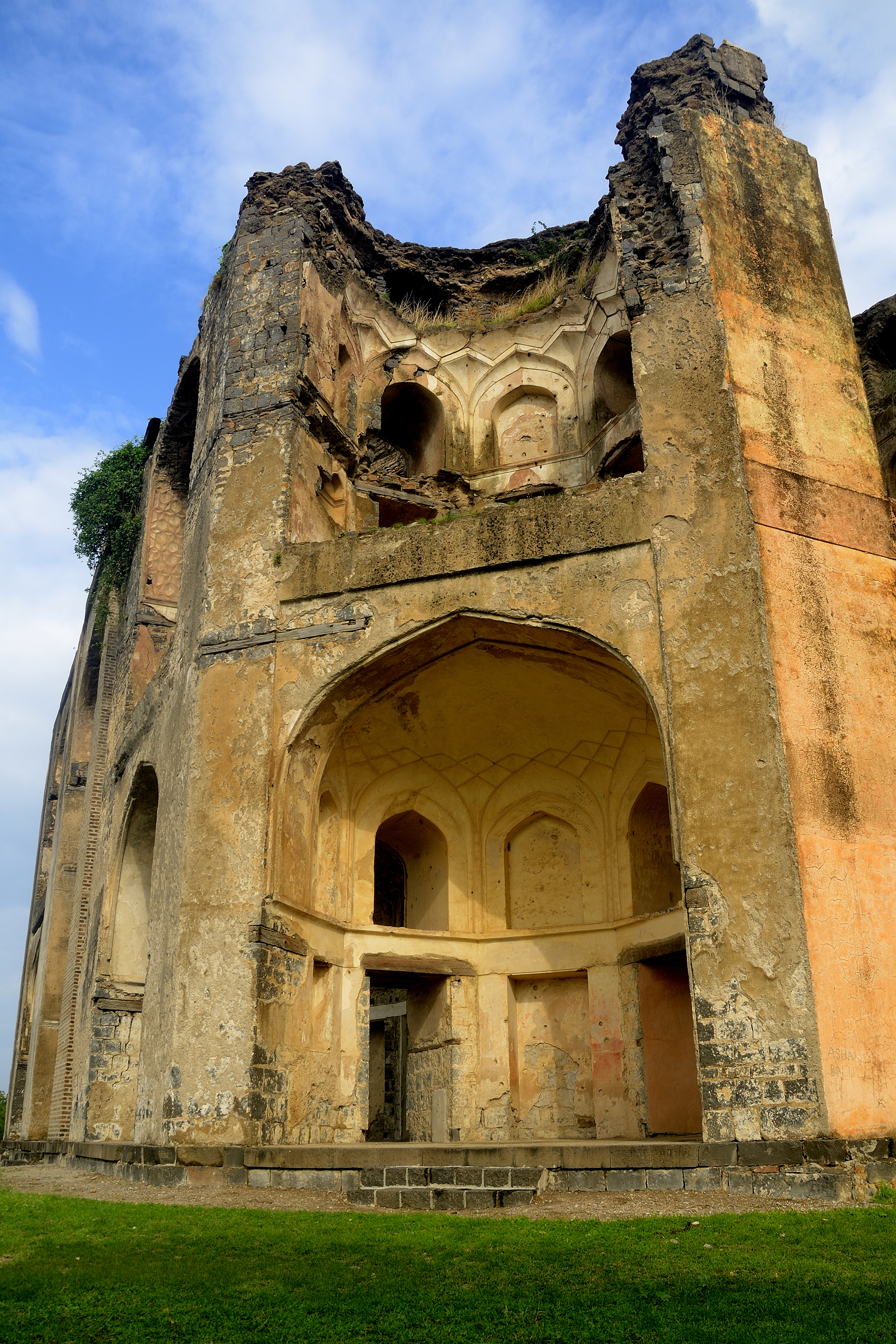
Alternative view of Farah Bagh
