= Pitalkhora =

Ancient Buddhist caves in India

Pitalkhora Caves
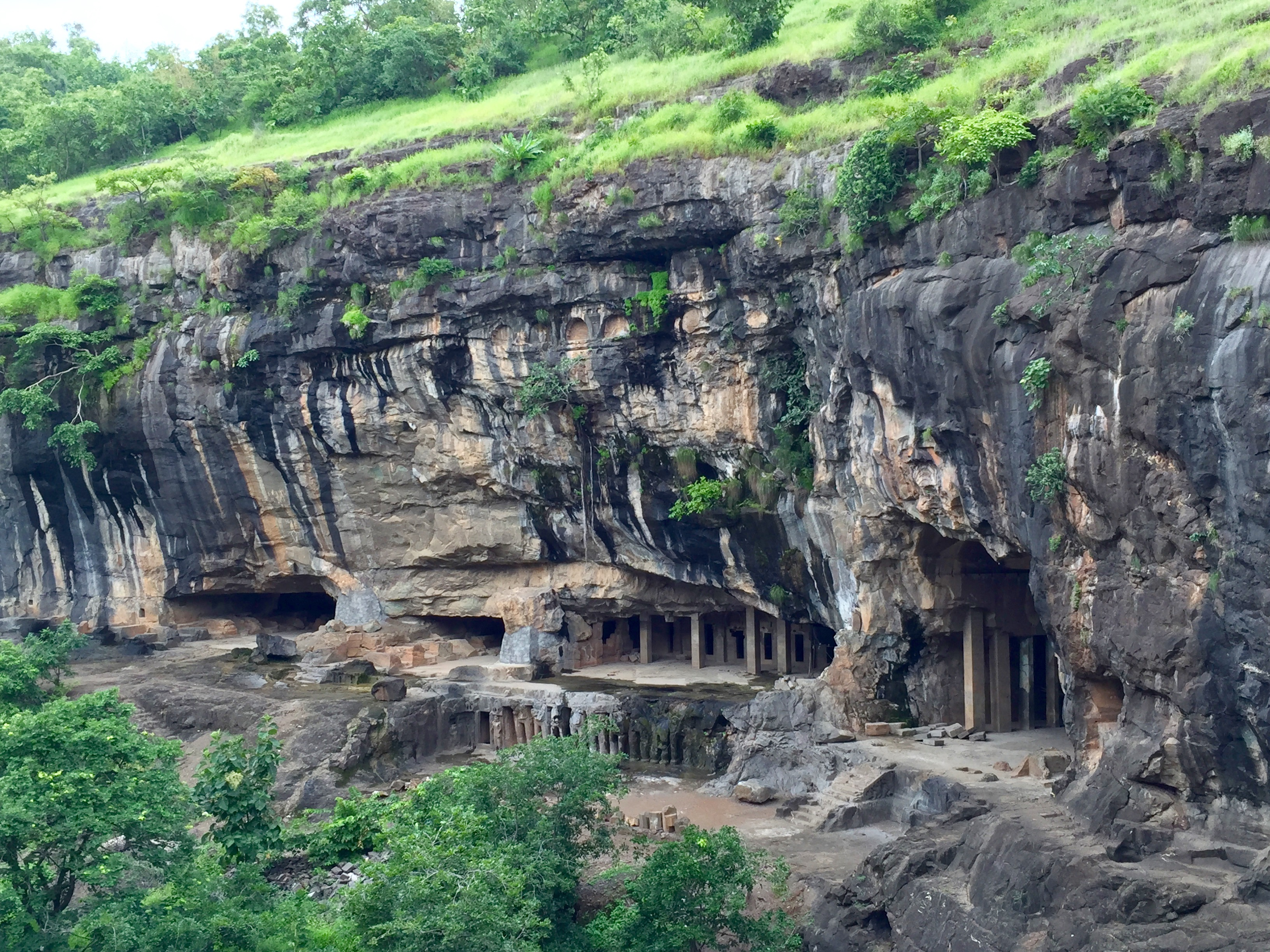
- Overview of Pitalkhora caves.

- Location within India
- Coordinates: 20.313473°N 74.994228°E
- Geology: Basalt

The Pitalkhora Caves, in the Satmala range of the Western Ghats of Maharashtra, India, are an ancient Buddhist site consisting of 14 rock-cut cave monuments which date back to the third century BCE, making them one of the earliest examples of rock-cut architecture in India. Located about 40 kilometers from Ellora, the site is reached by a steep climb down a flight of concrete stairs, past a waterfall next to the caves.

== Description ==
The caves are cut in a variety of basalt rock, but some of the caves have crumbled and are damaged. Out of the 14, four are chaityas (one housing votive stupas, one apsidal and single-cell) and the rest are viharas. All the caves belong to the Early Buddhist schools period, but the reasonably well preserved paintings are of the Mahayana period. The caves are in two groups, one of 10 caves and the second of four. It is believed that Pitalkhora can be identified with Ptolemy’s "Petrigala" as well as the "Pitangalya" of Mahamayuri, a Buddhist chronicle. The inscriptions date from c. 250 BCE to the 3rd and 4th centuries CE.

The site shows statues of elephants, two soldiers of which one is intact, a damaged Gaja Lakshmi icon, and an ancient rainwater harvesting system. These caves have been significant in helping establish the chronology of cave building in the Ajanta-Ellora region.

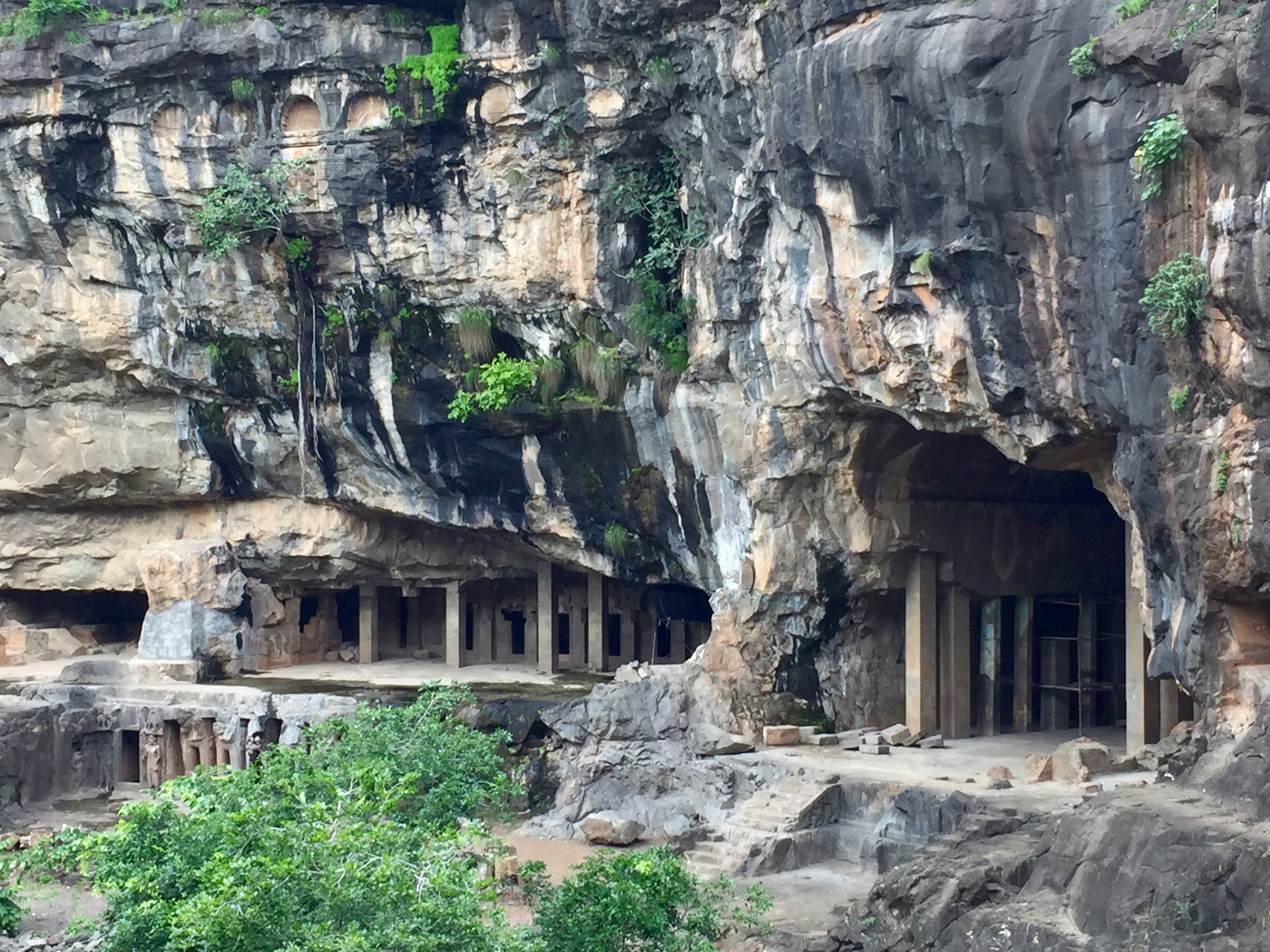
Some of the caves.

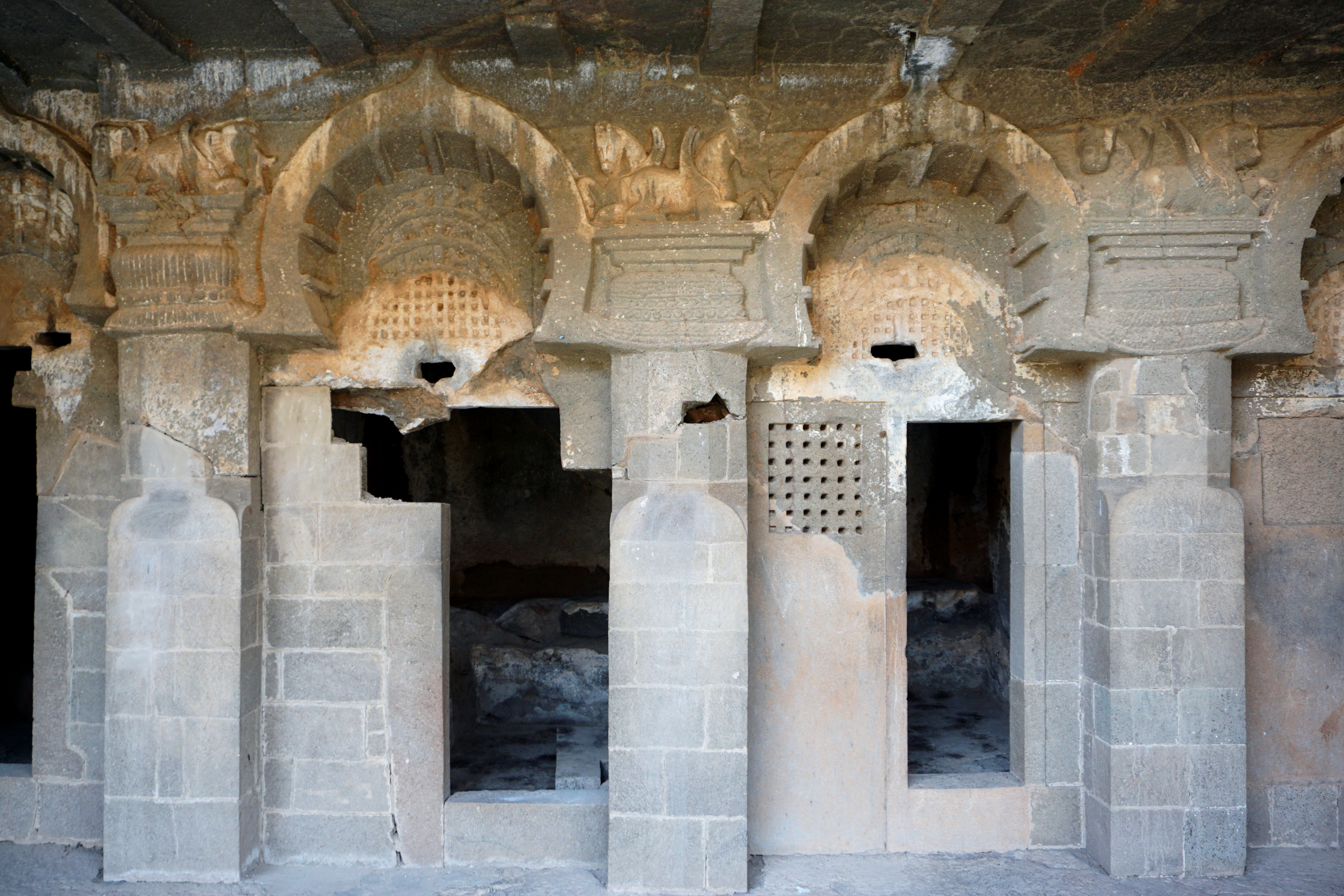
Reconstructed vihara cells.

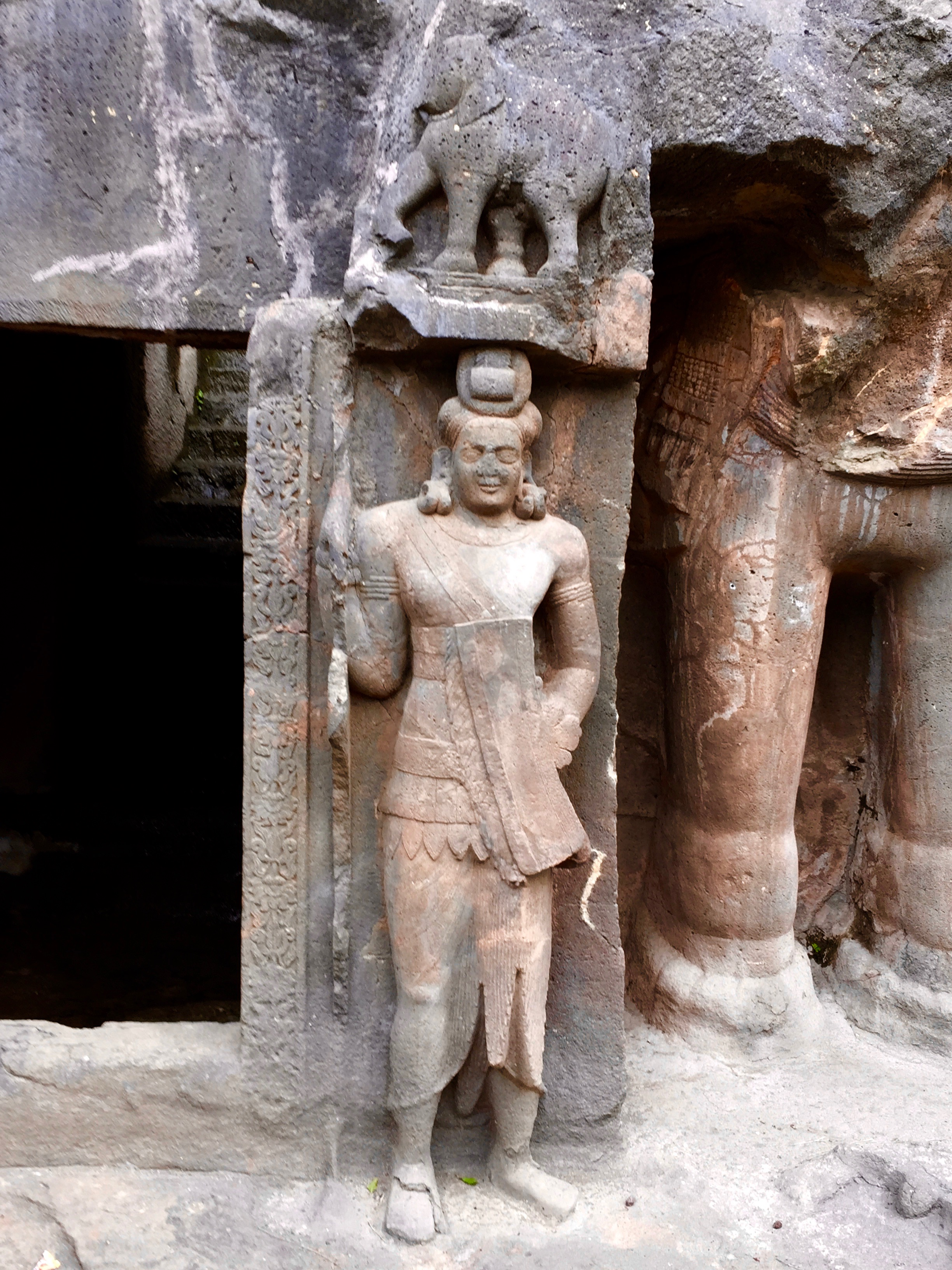
Dvarapala statue guarding a cave.

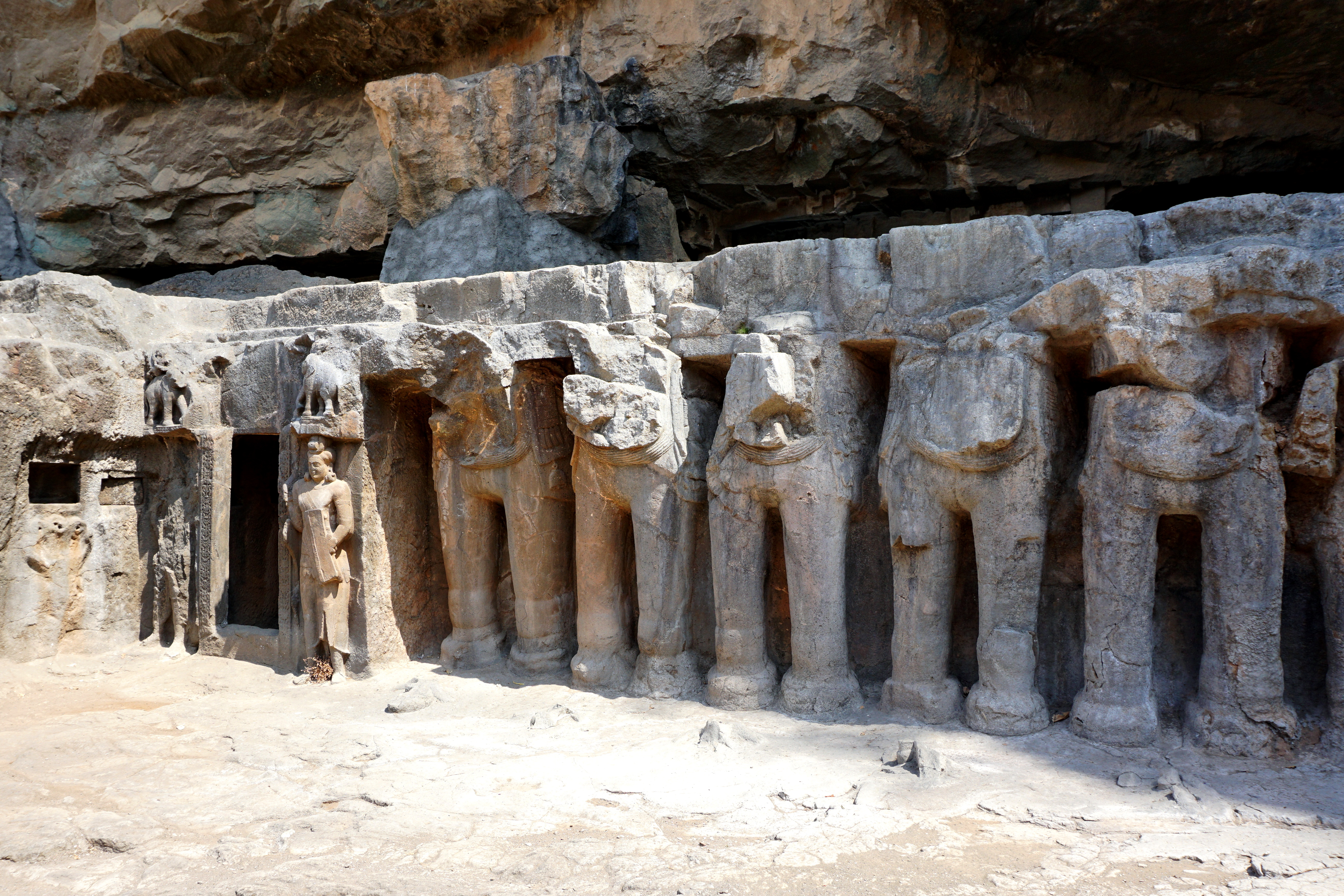
Row of broken sculptures of elephants.

== Chronology of the Chaitya hall (Cave 3) ==
The Chaitya hall, Cave 3 of Pitalkhora, represents an important marker in the chronology of the Chaitya hall design in western India. It is thought that the chronology of these early Chaitya Caves is as follows: first, in the 1st century BCE, Cave 9 at Kondivite Caves and then Cave 12 at the Bhaja Caves, which both predate Cave 10 of Ajanta. Then, after Cave 10 of Ajanta, in chronological order: Cave 3 at Pitalkhora, Cave 1 at Kondana Caves, Cave 9 at Ajanta, which, with its more ornate designs, may have been built about a century later, Cave 18 at Nasik Caves, and Cave 7 at Bedse Caves, to finally culminate with the "final perfection" of the Great Chaitya at Karla Caves.

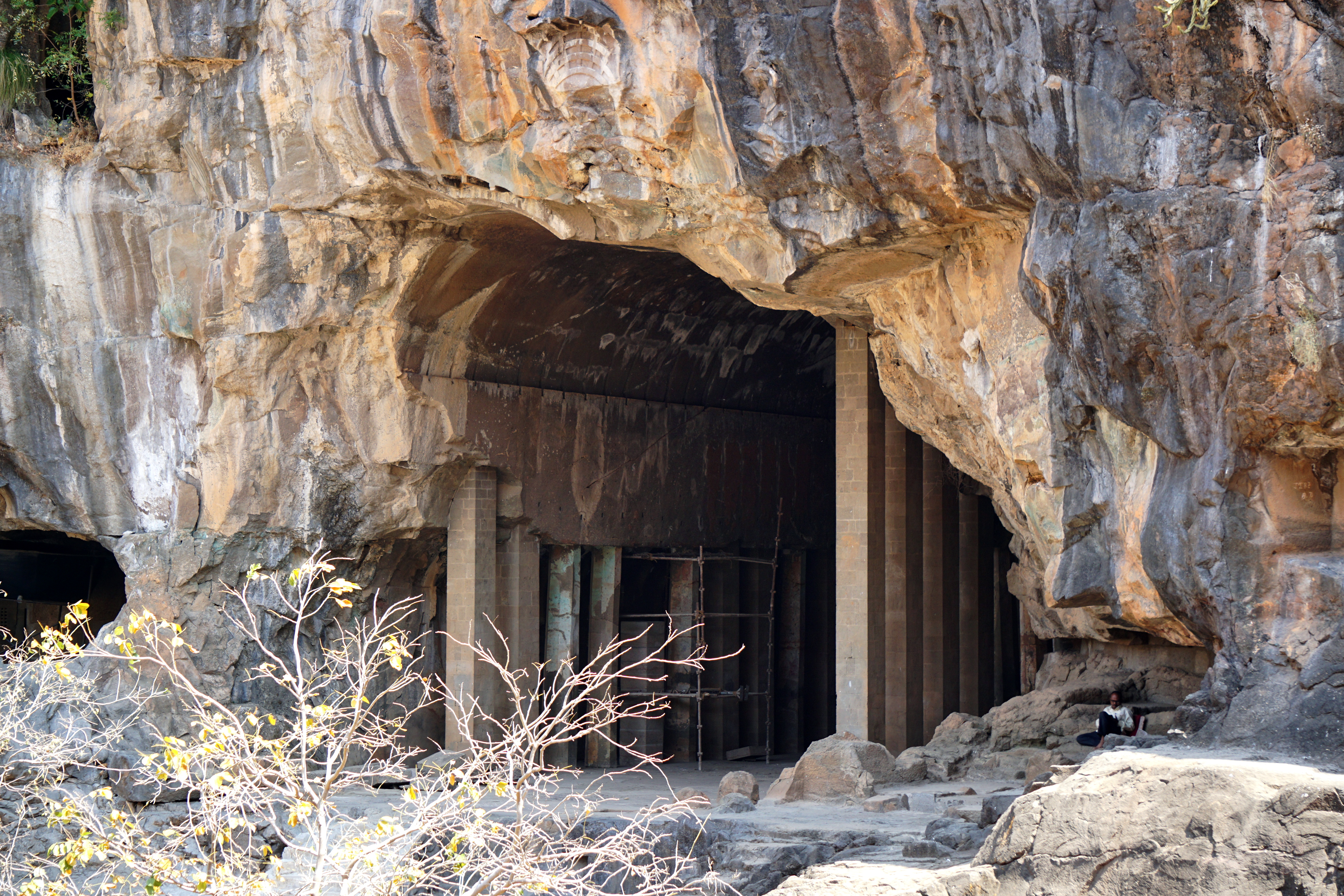
Side view of the Chaitya hall.

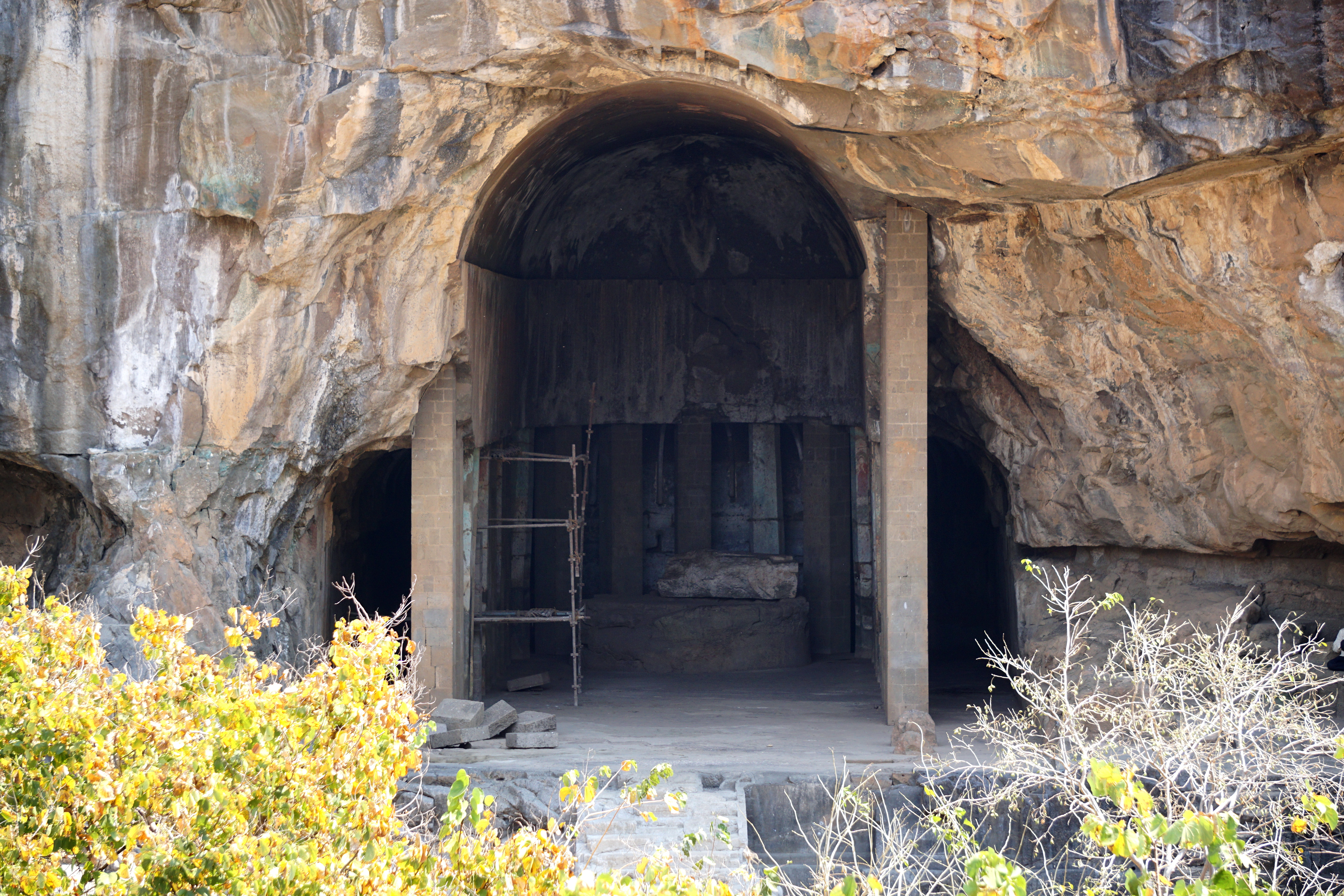
Cave 3, a Chaitya hall, front view.

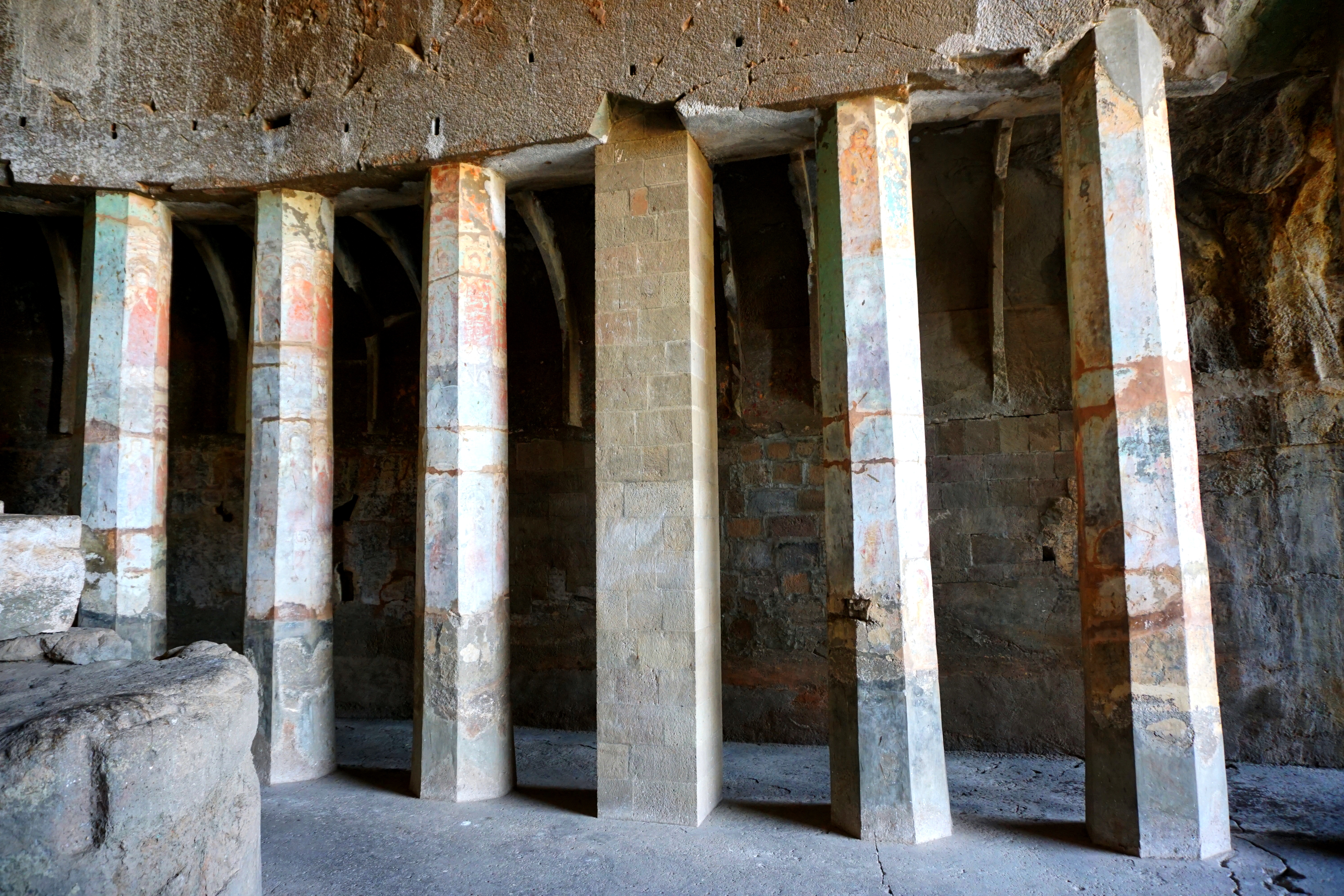
Rows of painted pillars.

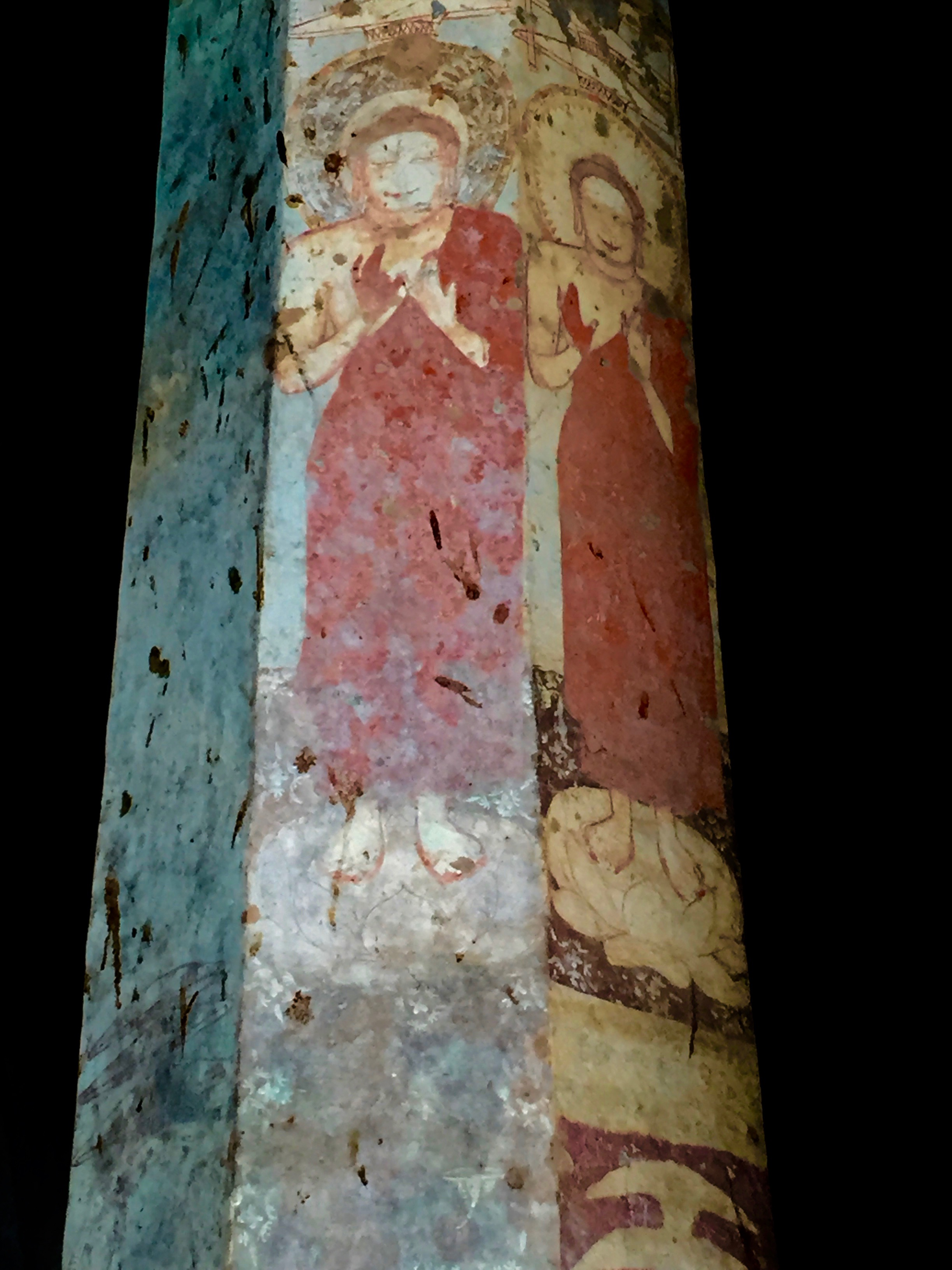
Ancient paintings (Mahayana period).
