= Tomb of Malik Ambar =

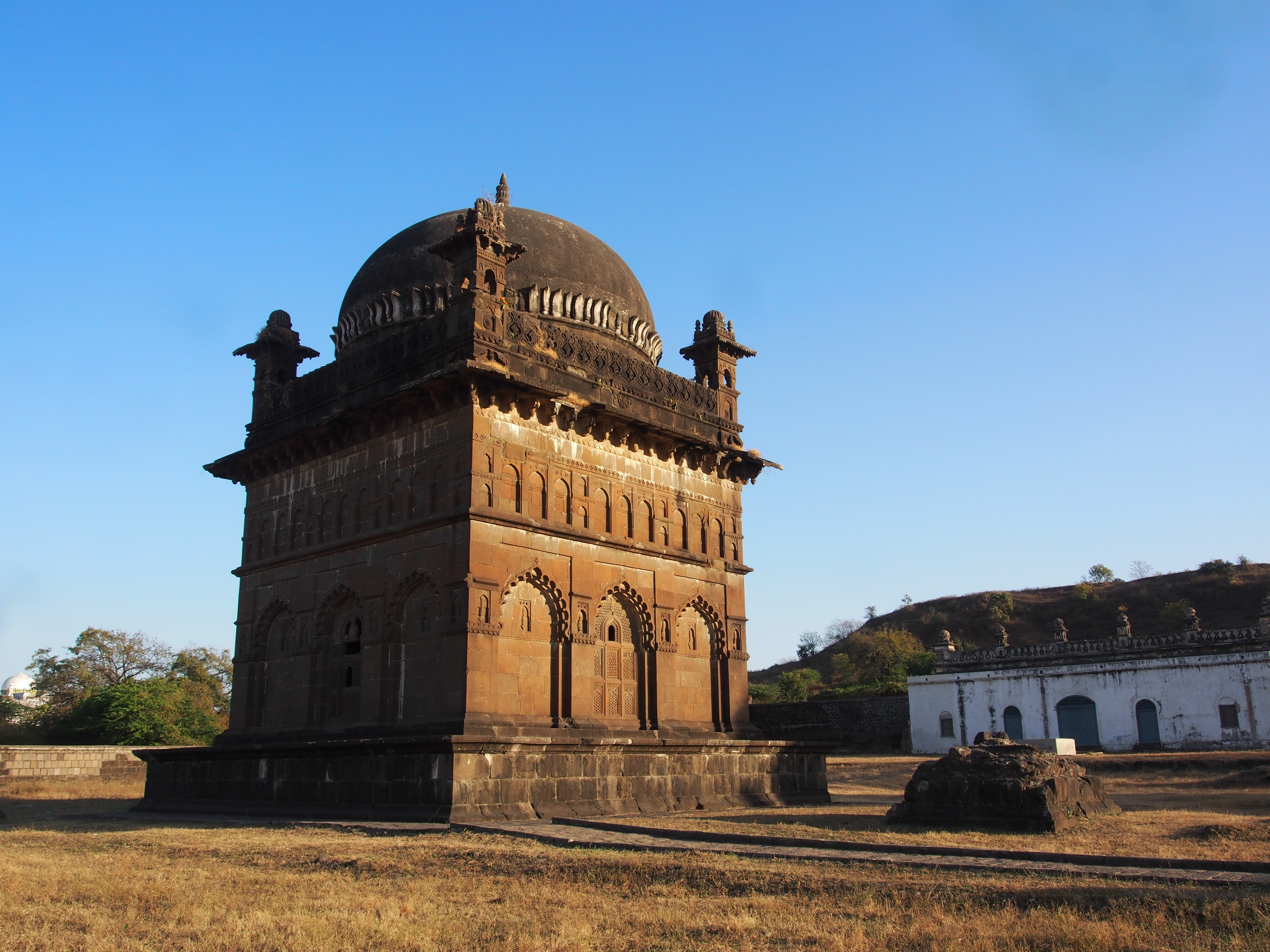
- Interactive map of Tomb of Malik Ambar
- Location: Khuldabad, Maharashtra, India
- Coordinates: 20.0142°N 75.1845°E

Monument of National Importance
- Official name: Tomb of Malik Ambar
- Reference no.: N-MH-A36

The Tomb of Malik Ambar is a mausoleum located in Khuldabad, in the Indian state of Maharashtra. It is the burial place of Malik Ambar, a military leader who served as the prime minister of the Ahmadnagar Sultanate. Ambar built the tomb for himself, and was interred here upon his death in 1626. It is listed as a monument of national importance.

== Background ==
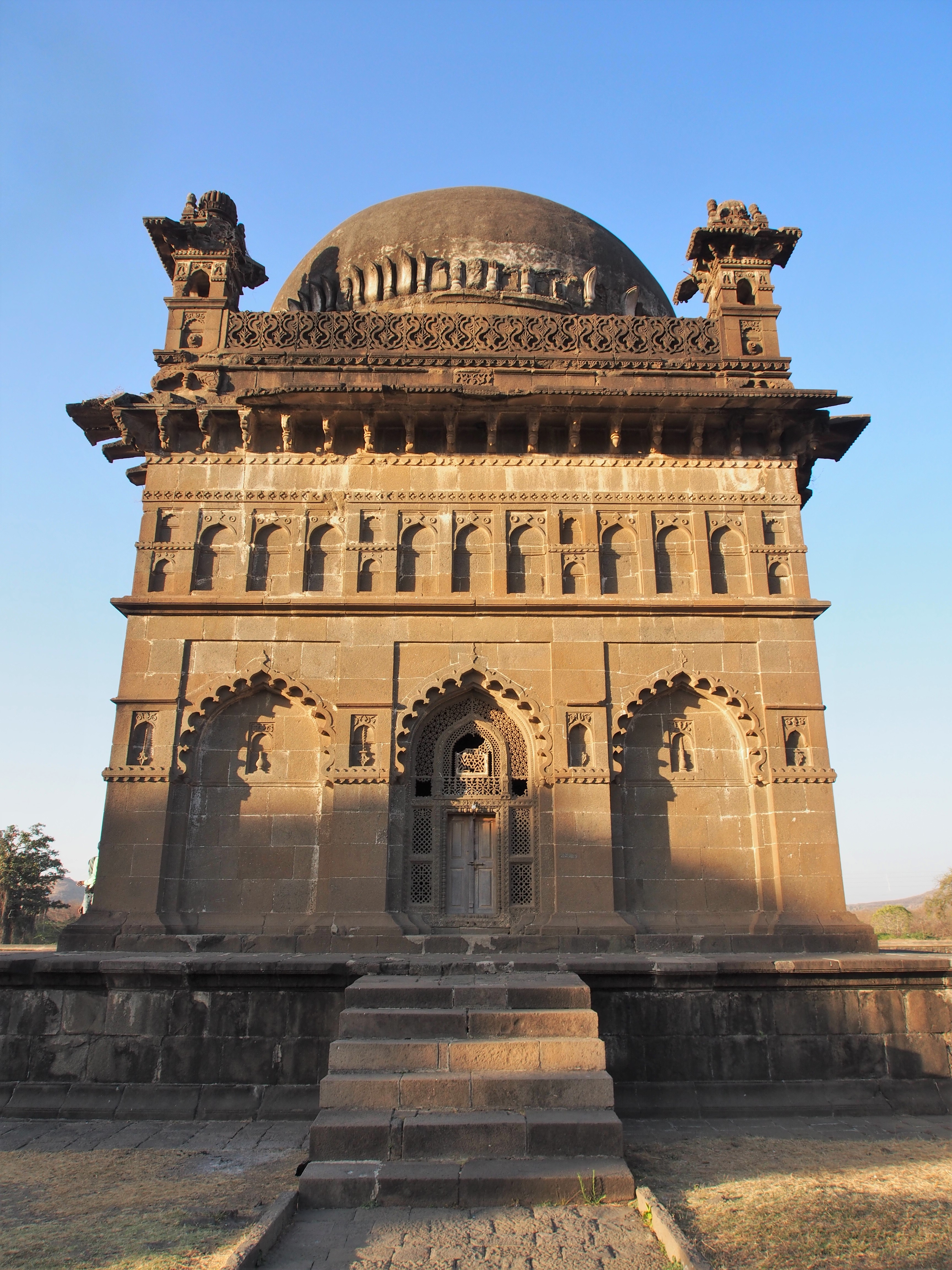
The tomb, viewed from the southern side

Malik Ambar was a former slave who rose to become the peshwa (prime minister) of the Ahmednagar Sultanate at the turn of the 17th century. Ambar is also credited with the construction of the Neher water system, as well as several mosques and tombs within Aurangabad. His tomb, which was commissioned by himself, and completed before his death, is considered to be built in the design of a royal mausoleum. Ambar was entombed here upon his death in 1626.

== Description ==
The tomb is located at the center of a large walled enclosure, which is entered through a gate on the eastern side. It is situated on a plinth, and has a square plan. The main construction material used is black basalt, held together by lime. On each side are three recesses with lobed arches. Of these, the central arch is decorated with latticed screens in the form of geometric patterns. The central arch on the southern side forms the entrance to the tomb. The western side is adorned by relief carvings instead. Above the three arches is a line of smaller and shallower recessed arches, which is overhung by a chhajja that runs along the length of the building, resting on ornate brackets. Domed pavilions are provided on top of all four corners of the building. It is surmounted by a main flattish dome, rising from a band of carved petals.

A smaller tomb, in a ruinous state, is located a few meters south-west of Ambar's tomb. It is not known who is buried within this tomb due to the lack of an inscription, but it is attributed to Ambar's grandson.

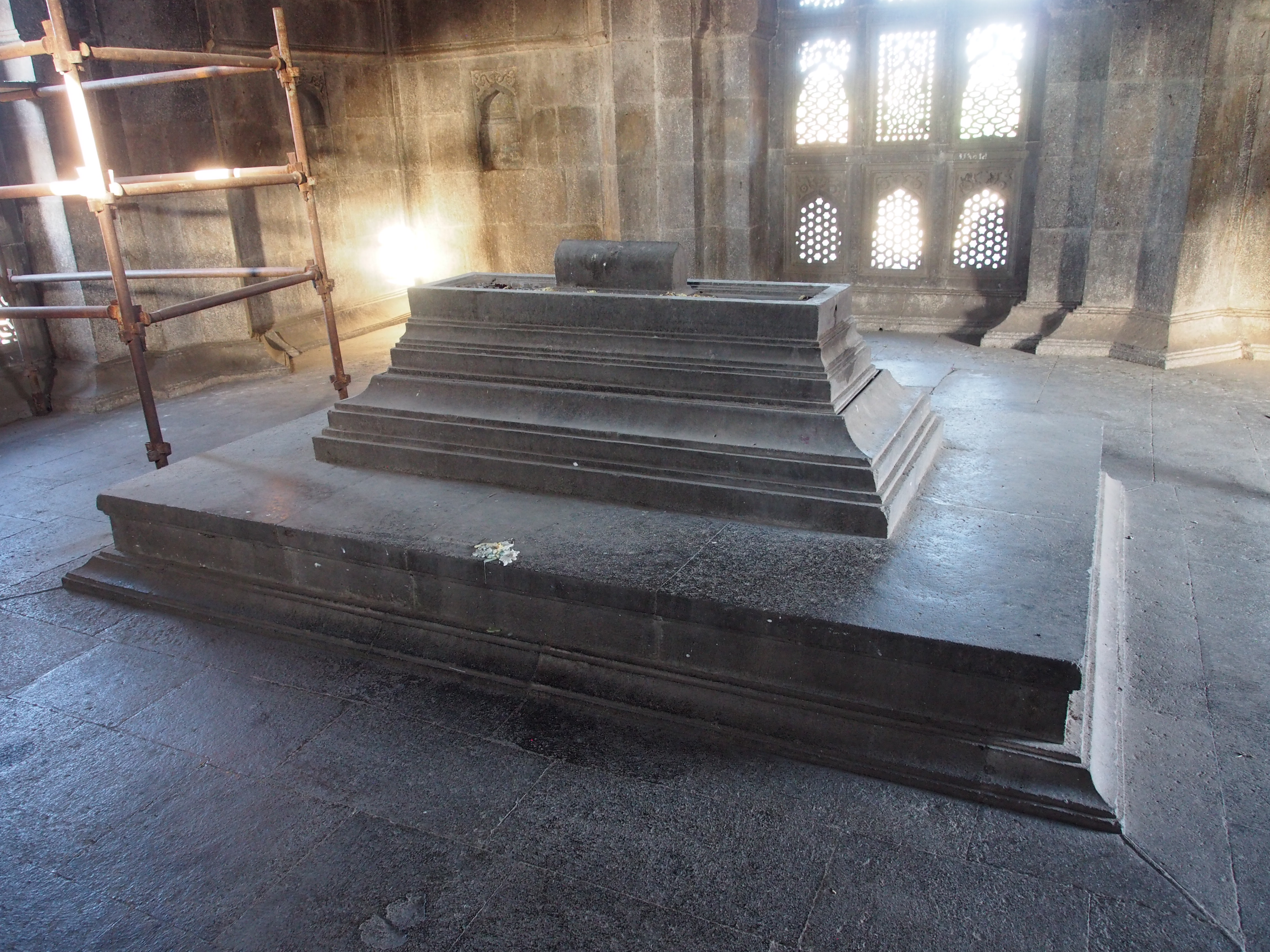
Interior
