= Vijasan Caves =

Caves with Buddhist art near Vijasan, Maharashtra, India

Coordinates: 20.0972°N 79.0979°E

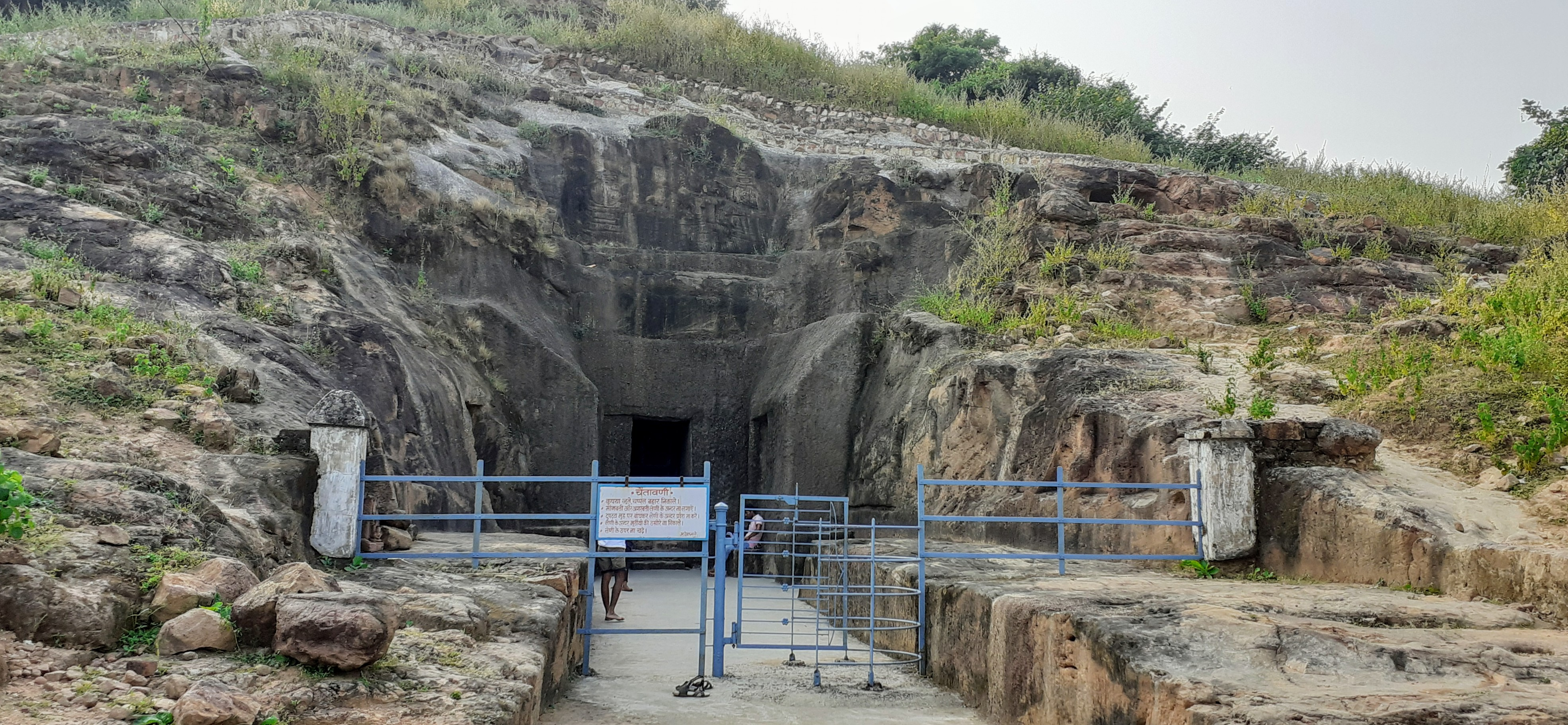
Entrance to the main cave

The Vijasan Caves are a series of caves containing Buddhist art located near the village of Vijasan in Chandrapur district, Maharashtra, India. Some of the caves at Vijasan have been in use since the 1st century AD. The closest nearby city is Bhadravati.

== Description ==
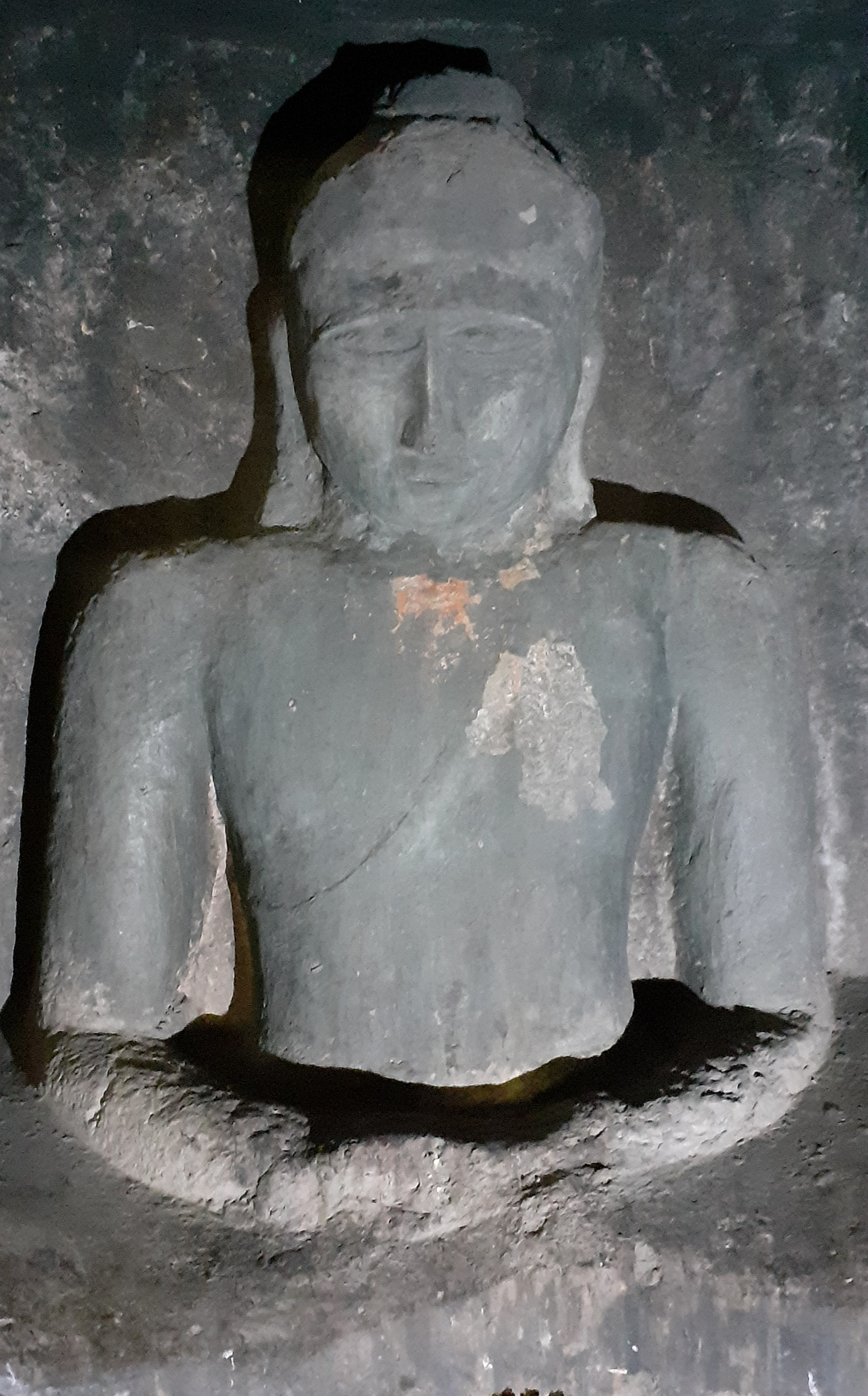
Buddhist sculpture in the caves

The oldest sites around Vijasan date to the 1st century AD, during the reign of Yajna Sri Satakarni of the Satavahana dynasty. Like similar megalithic caves, the caves at Vijasan were cut into stone foothills with intentionally narrow tunnels to prevent collapse. The main cave at Vijasan extends 71 feet (22 m) into the rock in a straight line, ending in a chamber with a carved Buddha sculpture. The tunnel also contains galleries furnished with wall carvings of religious scenes, though some of these have been damaged. Other, smaller caves and archaeological sites are also present in the area around Vijasan.

By the 19th century, the caves were being used to shelter the village's cattle. The caves were visited by British general Alexander Cunningham, who mentioned them in one of his books. The largest cave has been designated a Monument of National Importance by the Archaeological Survey of India.
