= Ratanwadi =

Village in Maharashtra

- Village
- Location in Maharashtra, India Ratanwadi (India)
- Coordinates: 19°31′03″N 73°43′23″E
- Country: India
- State: Maharashtra
- District: Ahmednagar

Languages
  - Official: Marathi
- Time zone: UTC+5:30 (IST)
- PIN: 422601
- Telephone code: 02424
- Vehicle registration: MH-17
- Nearest city: Akole
- Lok Sabha constituency: Shirdi
- Vidhan Sabha constituency: Akole

Ratanwadi is a village in Ahmednagar district, Maharashtra, India.
