= Balsane =

Village in Maharashtra

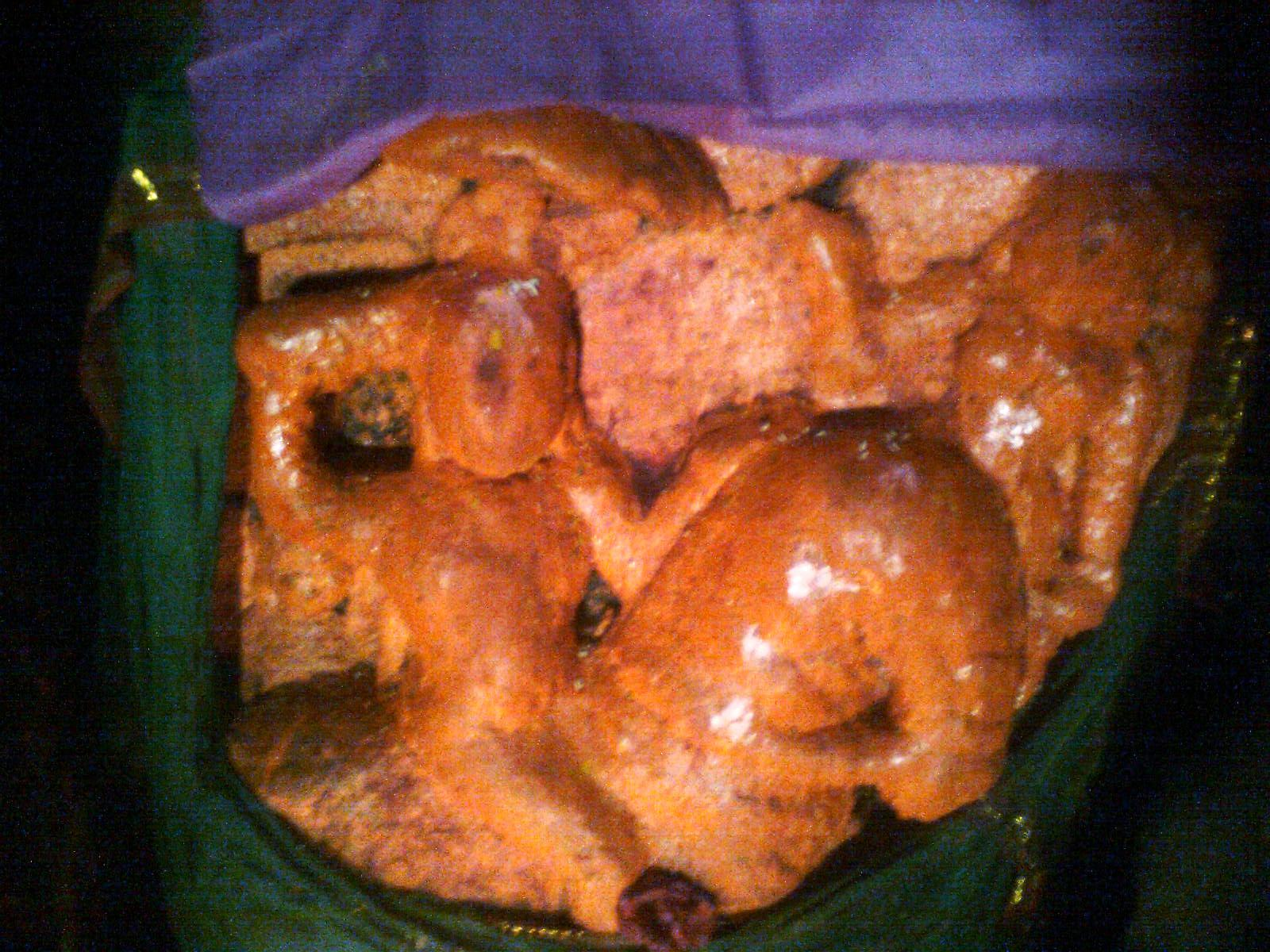
Idol of goddess Kanbai or Kandevi

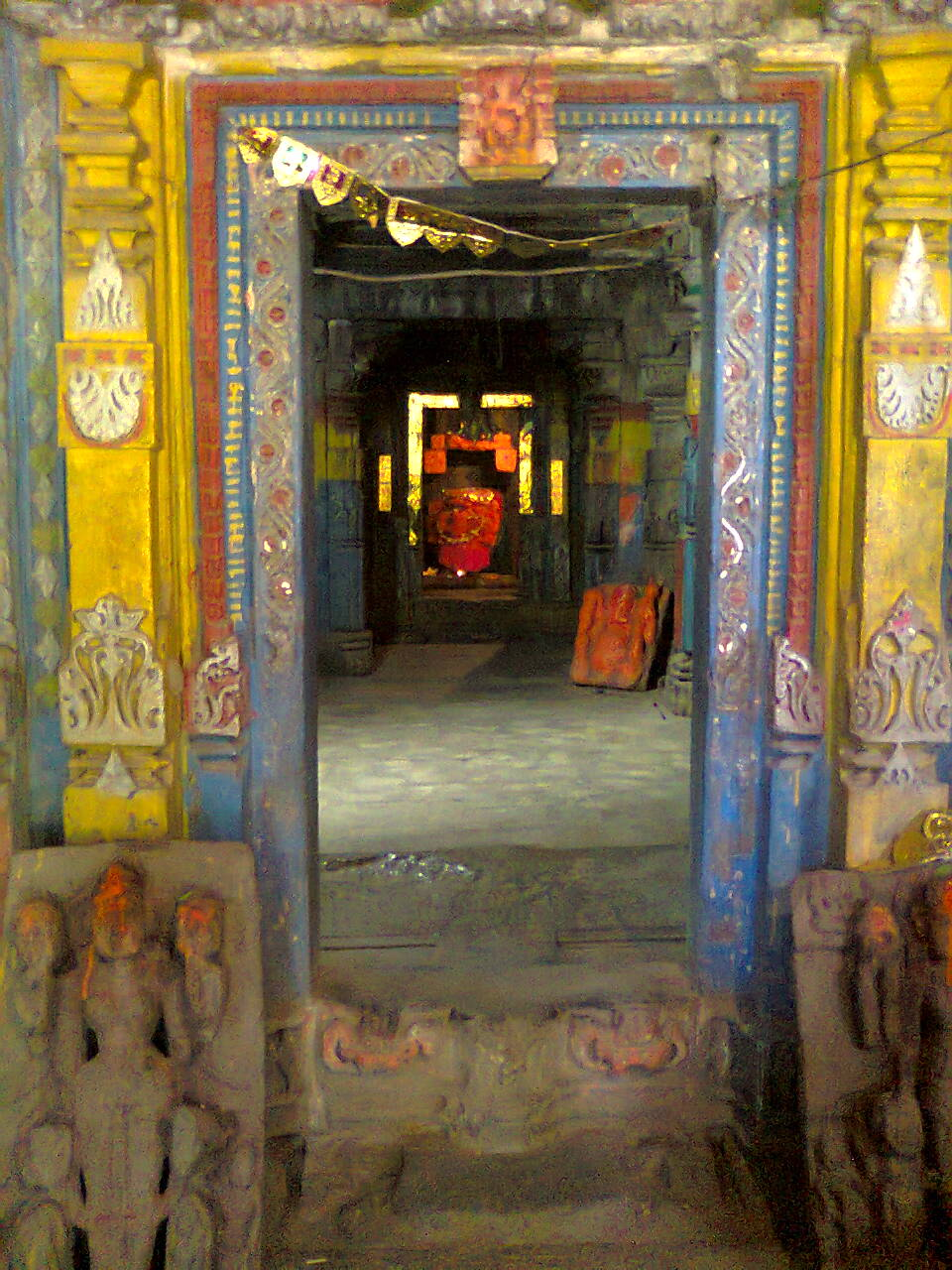
Entrance of Kanbai temple middle hall

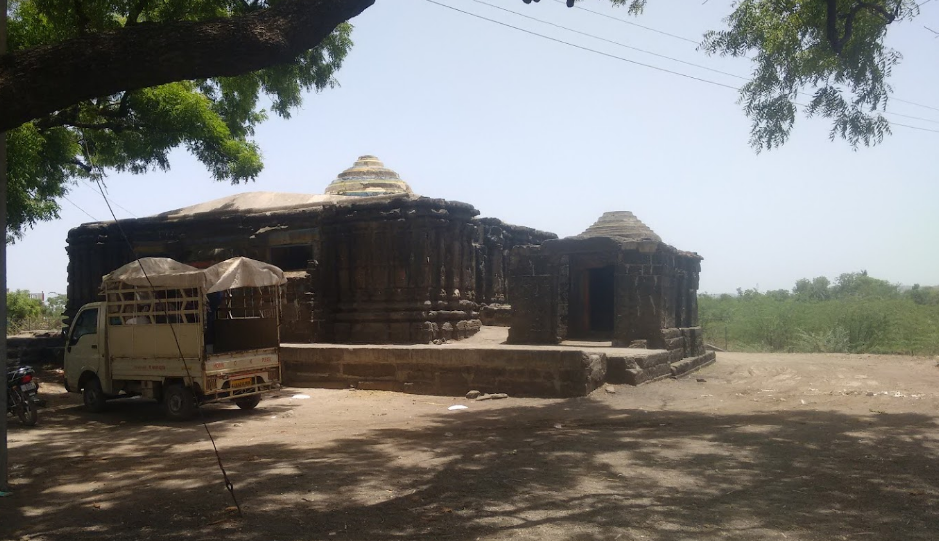
Main Kanbai temple

Balsane or Balsana is a village in Sakri Taluka, Dist Dhule, Maharashtra, India. It is known for two shrines, Kanubai Mata Temple and Vimalnath Swami Jain Temple. Nearby village, there are well maintained ancient caves. Thus Balsane becomes an interesting tourist and religious destination.

== Goddess Kanbai Temple ==
Goddess kanbai is said to be "avatar" of goddess parvati. She is well worshipped goddess in Maharashtra as well as the places where Maharashtrians lived. She is said to be the wife of "Kanher", "avatar" of God Shiva. This temple was made by Holkar queen. Now-a-days it is preserved by Maharashtra Government. The area around this ancient temple contains two more temples. One of God Shiva and one of God Surya (Sun). The Surya temple is broken and also the idol of God Surya is broken, The Shiva Temple is in good condition and used for worship by the villagers.

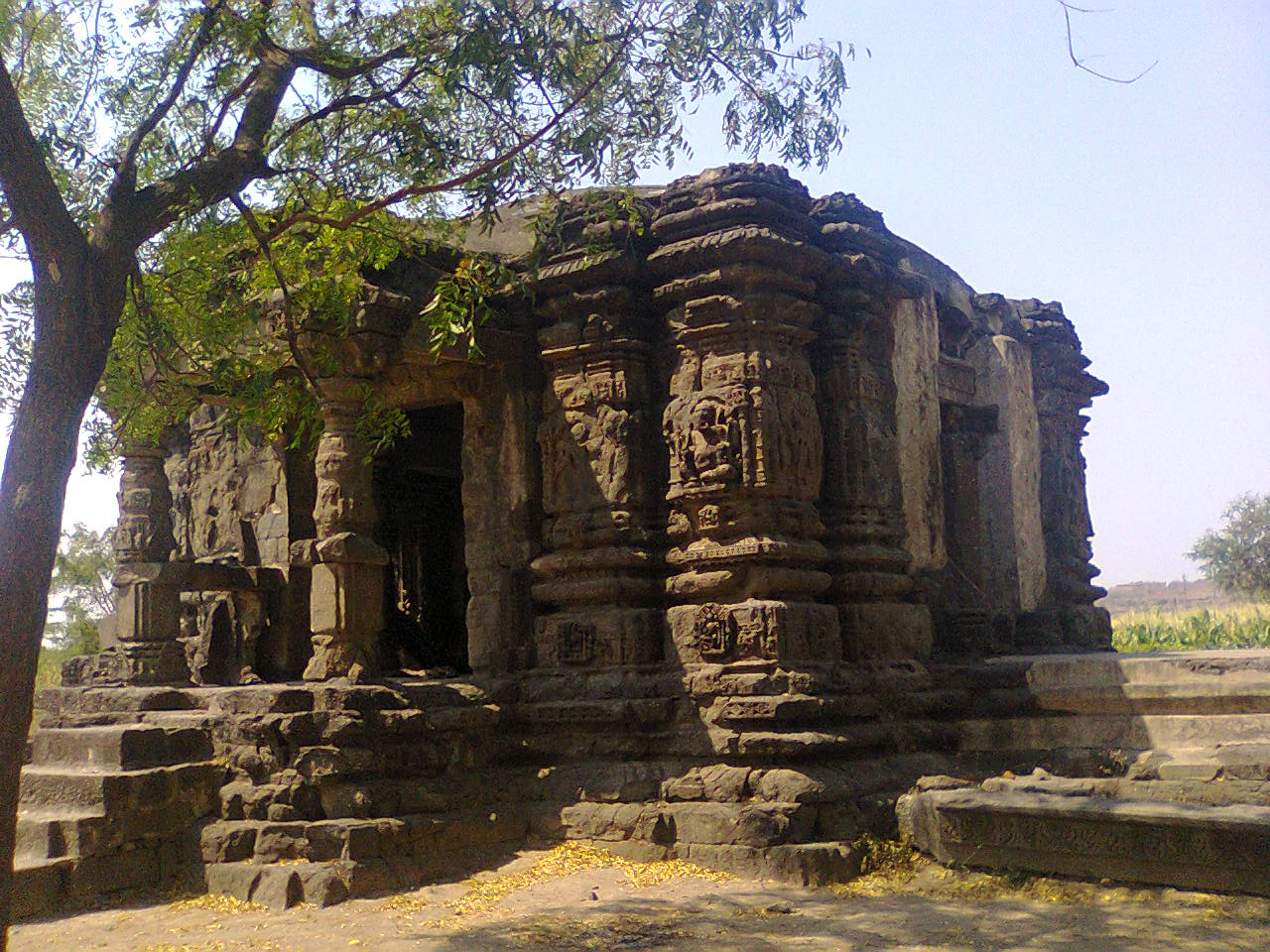
Mahadev shiv mandir

The Kanbai temple has three parts inside. The entrance is short and then comes the middle hall which has a number of small temples on right and left in recesses. Due to unavailability of natural light this portion is in darkness. The third part is the smaller room having an idol of the goddess Kanbai clad by "sindur" saffron colour powder used by Hindus on holy occasions. The entrance of the main third room is decorated with old Hindu carvings and was coloured by some stranger.

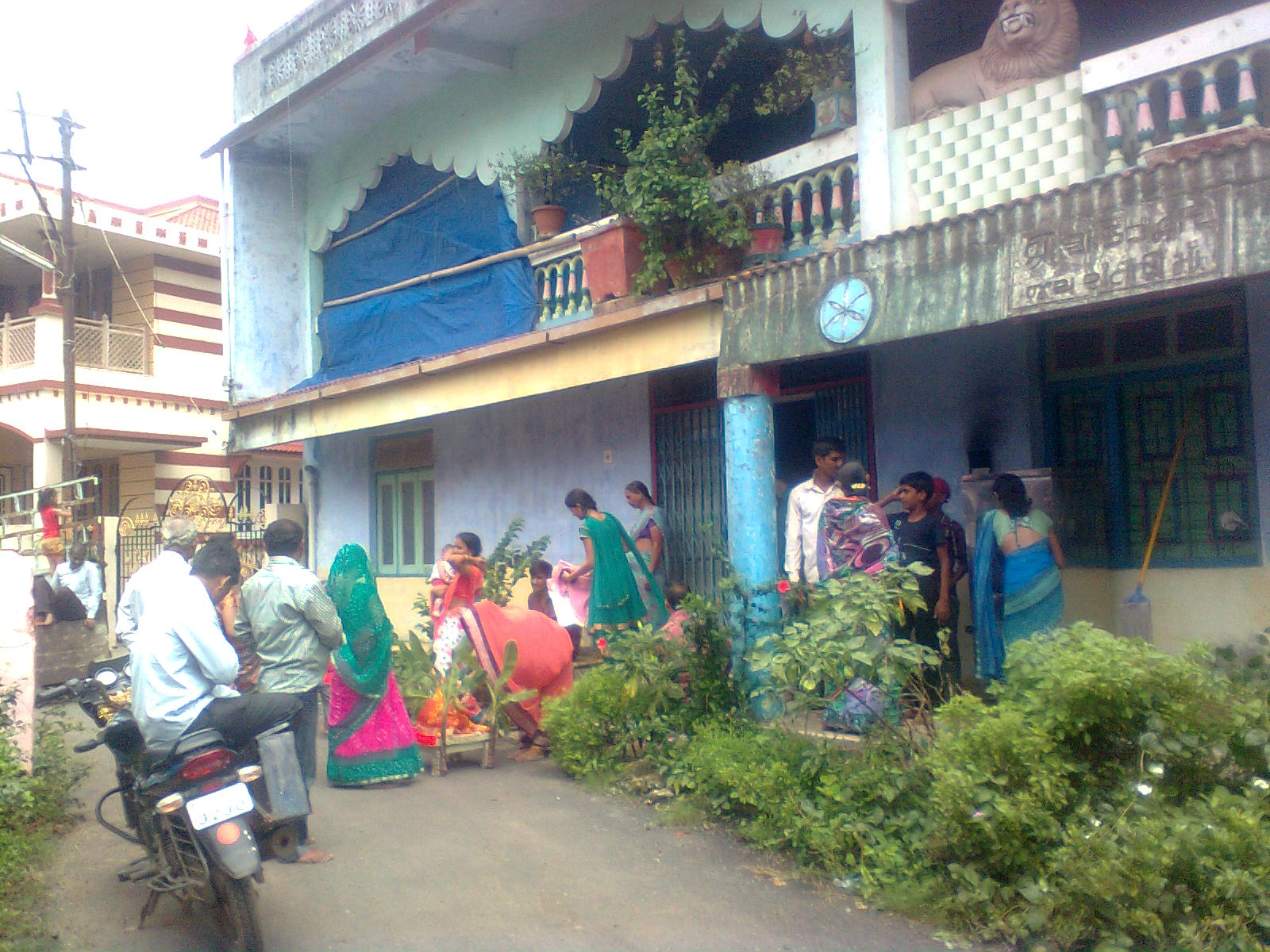
People taking Kanher-kanbai for visarjan

The goddess Kanbai is worshipped by Maharashtrian Ahirani people as she is the deity of many communities in this region. In Shravan month according to Hindu calendar the first Sunday after Nag-panchami, festival of Kanbai is celebrated. On the following day (Monday) people go to nearby riverside and Visarjan is done. The kanbai festival is celebrated in first or second week of Shravan month of Marathi panchang.

== Vimalnath swami Jain temple ==
Vimalnath swami was the thirteenth Jain tirthankar. His idol was found by a farmer buried in land. It was later given to acharya Shrimad Vijay Vidyanand Surishwarji by him and then a temple was made in Balsane. After that two dharamshala were also built by Jains.
