= Fourth siege of Szenttamás =

First battle of the Hungarian War of Independence 1848

Coordinates: 45°32′48.7″N 19°47′58.4″E

- Part of the Hungarian Revolution of 1848
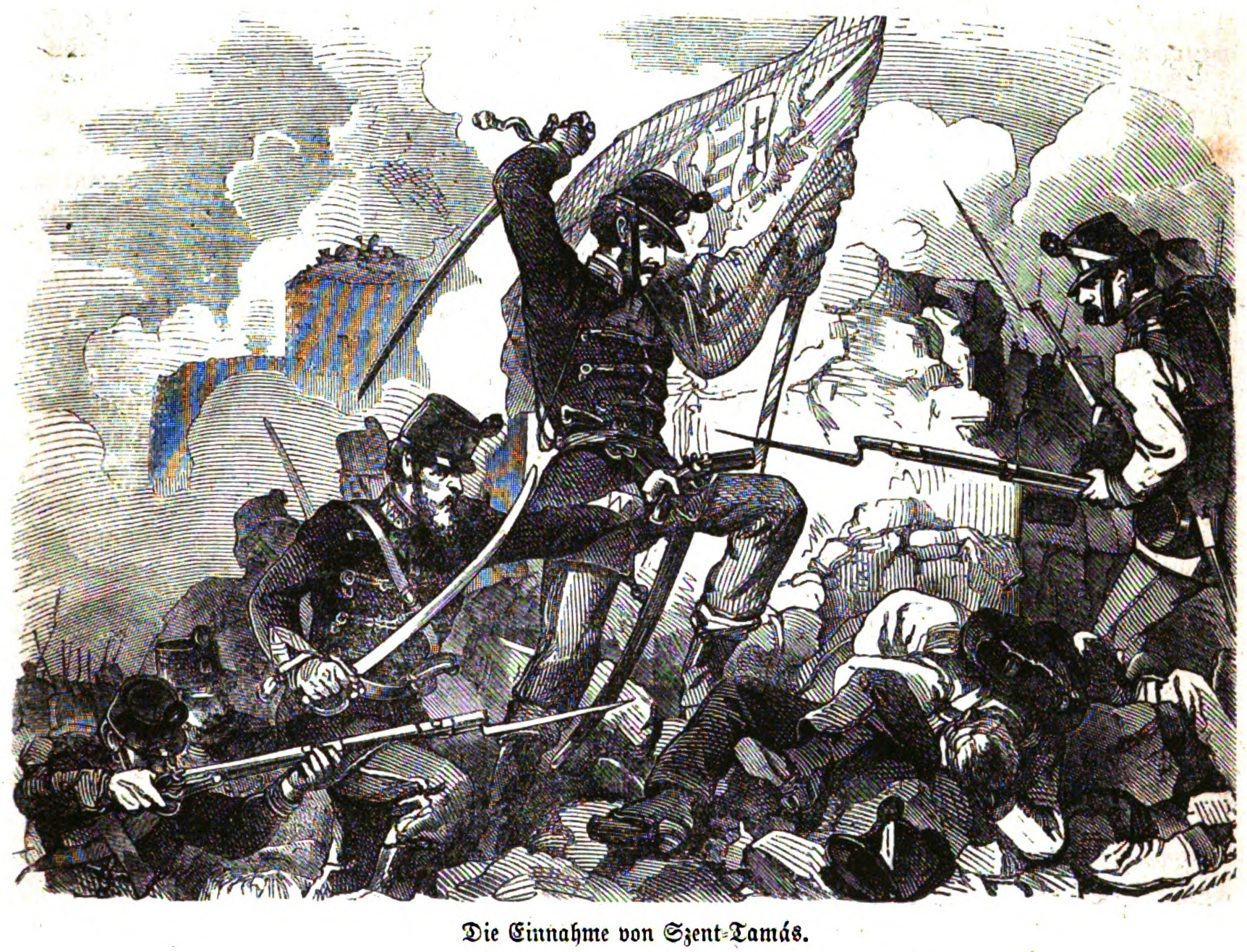
| Date | 3 April 1849 |
| Location | Szenttamás, Bács-Bodrog County, Kingdom of Hungary (today Srbobran, Serbia) |
| Result | Hungarian victory after three unsuccessful sieges, they finally capture this Serbian stronghold |

Belligerents
| Hungarian Revolutionary Army | Austrian Empire: Serbian Vojvodina |

Commanders and leaders
| Mór Perczel | Jovan Stefanović Vilovski |

Strength
| 7,000–8,000 men 30 cannons | 2,000–4,000 men 9-14 cannons |

Casualties and losses
| 22 dead 100 wounded | 2,000–4,000 men 6 cannons |

The fourth siege of Szenttamás (now Srbobran, in the South Bačka District, Vojvodina, Serbia) was a siege during the Hungarian War of Independence of 1848-1849, as a part of the Serb uprising of 1848–49, on 3 April 1849, carried out by the Hungarian Army under the command of General Mór Perczel against the Serbian fortified encampment in Szenttamás and Turia held by the Serb insurgents led by Captain Jovan Stefanović Vilovski. The Serbian fortified camp of Szenttamás was considered impregnable by the Hungarians, as in the Summer and Fall of 1848 they failed three times to capture it. But with the start of the Hungarian Spring Campaign of 1849, General Perczel began to score victories after victories against the Serbs, and on 3 April, he managed to capture also Szenttamás, after a heroic Serbian resistance. After this victory, Perczel's troops continued to advance toward the Hungarian fortress of Pétervárad, and relieve it after half of year of Serbian and Austrian blockade.

== Background ==
In mid-March 1849, after the winter defensive battles on the Maros line against the Serbs, the Hungarian troops stationed in and around Szeged prepared to launch an offensive against them, to liberate the Bácska and Bánát regions.

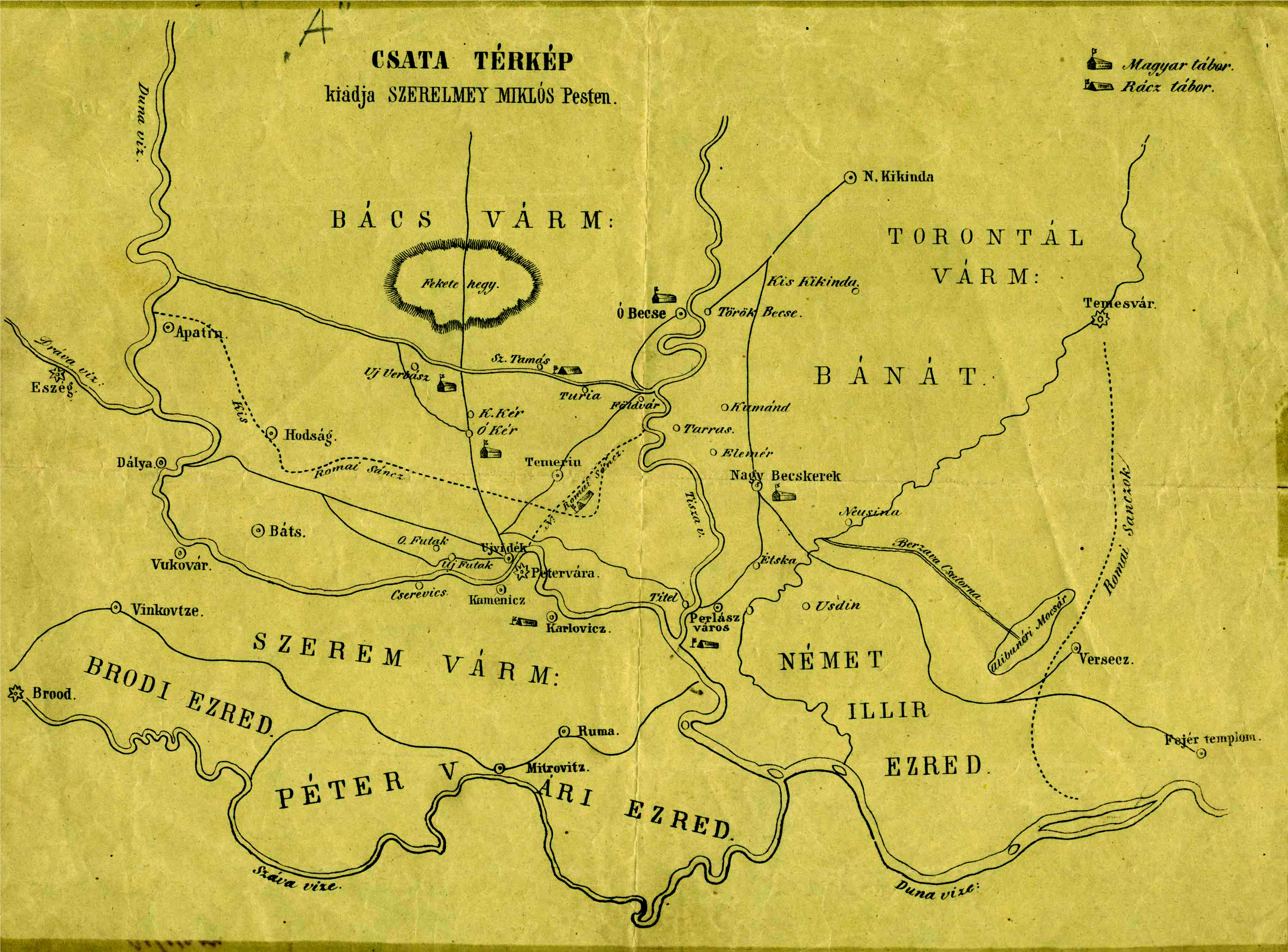
The War Theater in Southern Hungary in 1849. Dotted line: The Roman trenches

Their new commander, General Mór Perczel, considered the most important task to be the relieving of the besieged fortress of Pétervárad. On 22–23 March his troops broke through the Serb positions around Szeged, on 28–29 March they relieved the northern part of the Pétervárad fortress from the besieging troops, and after the failed attack on the fortifications at Kamanc on 29 March, Perczel marched against Verbász on 31 March. Here, at the floodgate, a Serbian troop of 500 men and 2 guns attacked Perczel's troops from the direction of Kula, but were defeated and they retreated towards Zombor, leaving one gun behind. On 1 April Perczel set off for Kula, where under the command of Captain Forget a reinforcement of 2 infantry battalions, 1/2 cavalry company, and 6 guns arrived, sent by Lieutenant Colonel Igmándy from Szeged. His army now consisted of 8 infantry battalions, 6 hussar companies and 30 guns. Hearing about this, the Royal-Imperial (K.u.K.) and Serbian forces from Zombor retreated to Bezdán, and there they crossed the Danube. The Hungarians captured a significant stock of grain at Kula. Perczel's next destination was the Serbian fortified camp in Szenttamás.

== Prelude ==
=== The two armies ===
The dangerous situation of Szenttamás had been clear to the Austrian and Serbian commanders long before April 1849, as they knew that there was no serious obstacle on the way to it and that their defensive force was not too big. Nevertheless, before the fourth siege, two weeks passed with the Serb and Austrian commanders writing to each other about the perilous situation of the Szenttamás fortified camp, but no soldiers were sent to reinforce it. On 31 March, Perczel even did them the favor of sending an ultimatum to the defenders: surrender or be wiped off the face of the earth. But the answer was no.

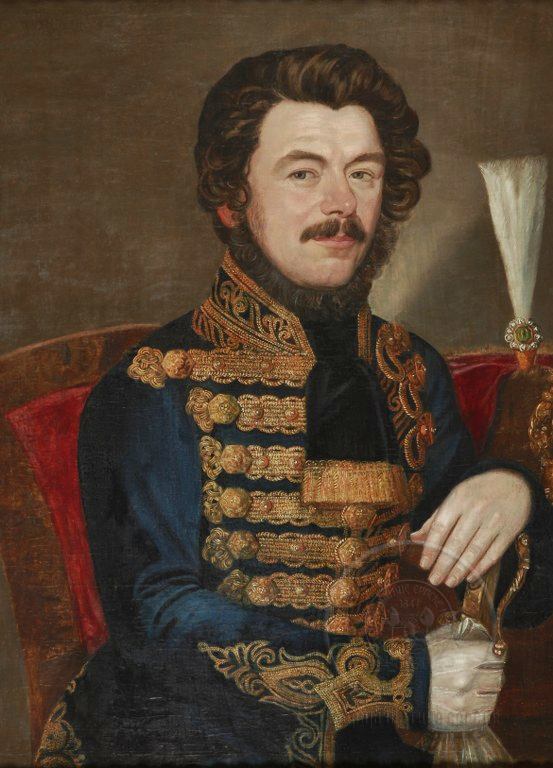
N. Aleksic, Jovan Stefanovic Vilovski (1850)

Finally, on April 3, Mór Perczel's troops appeared before Szenttamás. The defenders numbered 2,000-3,000 men and 9 (according to other sources 14) three-pounder guns, commanded by the K.u.K. Military engineer Captain Jovan Stefanović Vilovski. According to the historian József Bánlaky, the Serbian defense force consisted of 3-4000 Serbian border guard soldiers and 14 cannons. Engineer Captain Stefanović was sent by General Kuzman Todorović to Lieutenant Colonel Nugent on the line of the Ferenc Canal. On 1 April, the latter arrived in Szenttamás via Óbecse, Bácsföldvár, and Turia, and, having been informed of Perczel's intention of attack, remained in Szenttamás and took over command from Bosnić, his junior in rank.

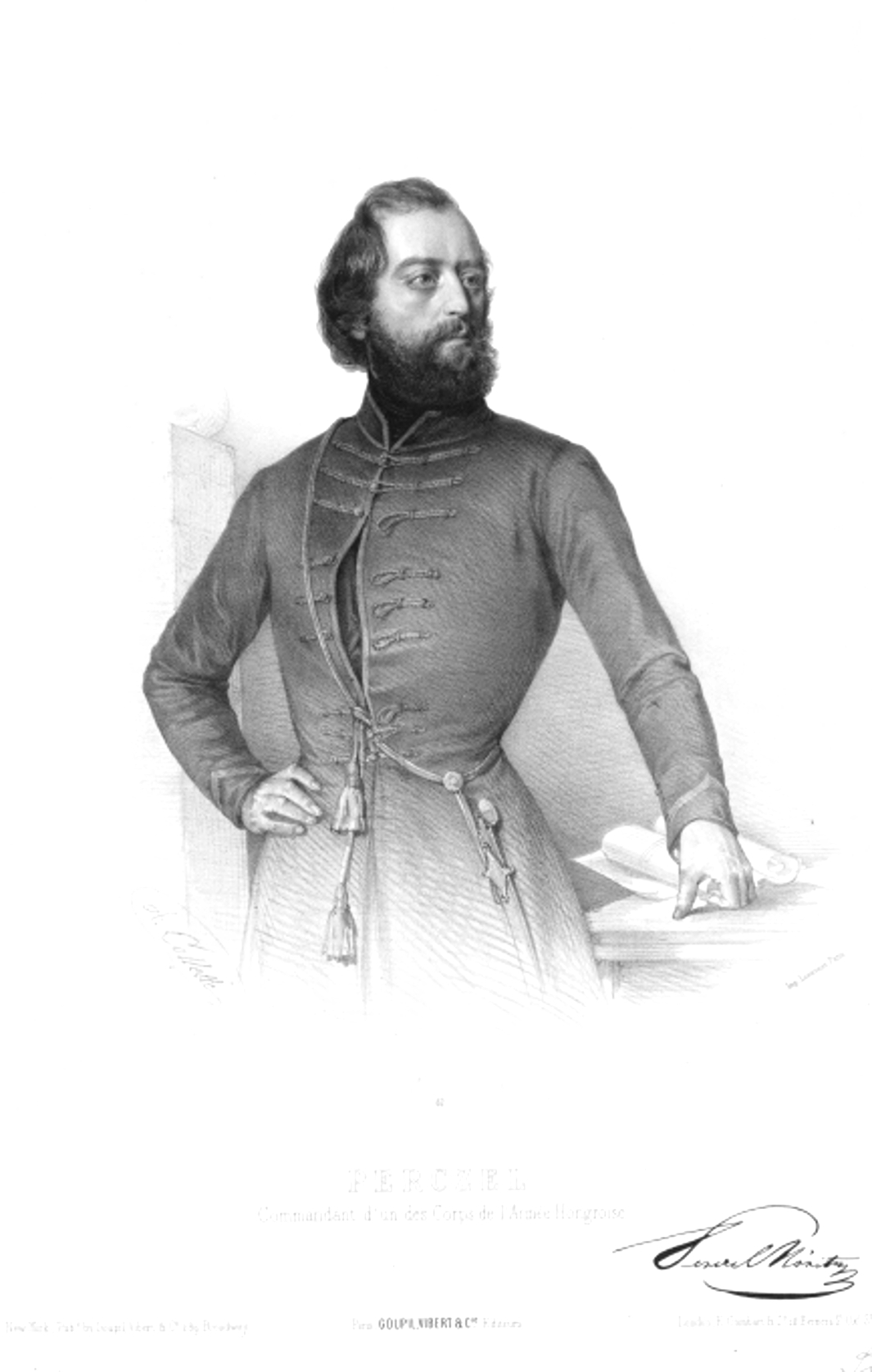
Perczel Mór 1848

Austrian-Serbian sources report two versions of the composition of the Serbian defense force. According to one of them, there were only 2 companies of Pétervárad border guards, 100 Servians, and the armed inhabitants of the city with five 3-pounder guns, while according to another, there were 1 Militia battalion, 2 Šajkaši companies, 4 Pétervárad border guard companies and 200 Servians with 8 three-pounder Šajkaši cannons under Captains Teodor Bosnić and Stefanović formed the defending troops of Szenttamás. The defenders had 100 bullets per rifle, so Stefanović asked for ammunition from the K.u.K. troops, and asked Colonel Lazar Mamula, who was at Kamanc, to demonstrate with a cavalry detachment in the rear of the Hungarians. However, his requests were to no avail due to the late demand. The attackers must have engaged about 7,000-8,000 men and 30 guns.

According to one Serbian source (which shows the smallest number of defenders), on 3 April, the defenders were positioned in Szenttamás as follows: In the Verbász Trenches, under the command of Captain Bosnić, there was 1 company of border guards from Pétervárad, troops of the armed residents of Szenttamás, and 3 three-pounder guns. In the Pétervárad bridgehead, under Captain Stefanović there was 1 Pétervárad border guard company, 100 Servians, troops of the armed inhabitants of Szenttamás, and a squad called the Kiskér Guard with 2 three-pounder guns.

On 3 April, before dawn, the Hungarians departed in two columns from Verbász and Kiskér towards Szenttamás. The left column, consisting of the 5th and 8th Honvéd and the 2nd Wasa battalions and 2 six-pounder batteries (12 guns) advanced on the northern bank of the canal, while the other, consisting of the 7th Honvéd battalion, 1 battalion of the Turski Regiment, 4 companies (half a battalion) of the Szeged volunteers and 1 battery (6 guns), approached from Kiskér, i.e. from the south. The left column, commanded by Colonel László Gaál, attacked the Verbász ramparts, while the right column, commanded by Perczel's brother, Lieutenant Colonel Miklós Perczel, attacked the bridgehead of Pétervárad. The reserve column was distributed on both banks of the Ferenc Canal, and on the left bank 1 National Guard battalion, 1 Hussar company, 1 six-pounder battery, on the right bank 1 National Guard battalion, 5 Hussar companies,1 six-pounder battery. Total 2 infantry battalions, 6 cavalry companies, 12 guns.

=== The fortified camp of Szenttamás ===
Szenttamás is situated on the left bank of the Ferenc Canal and at that time it had 1,600 houses with 10,000-12,000 inhabitants. The muddy waters of the Krivaja, making several meanders, protect the northern side of the town and join the Ferenc Canal at Turia. The canal was 100–150 paces wide and 2–3 meters deep at Szenttamás. The Krivaja meanders between banks 3–4 m high, and 30–50 paces wide, the bottom is muddy, and the average depth above this is 1 m. Both waters are sluggish. The bridge over the Ferenc Canal was at the southern entrance to the town. At the same place the road forked towards Verbász, Ókér, Temerin, and Turia. West of this bridge, a lock connects the two banks at the southwest corner of Szenttamás. The bridges over the Krivaja were on the roads leading to Bácsfeketehegy, Óbecse and near Turia.

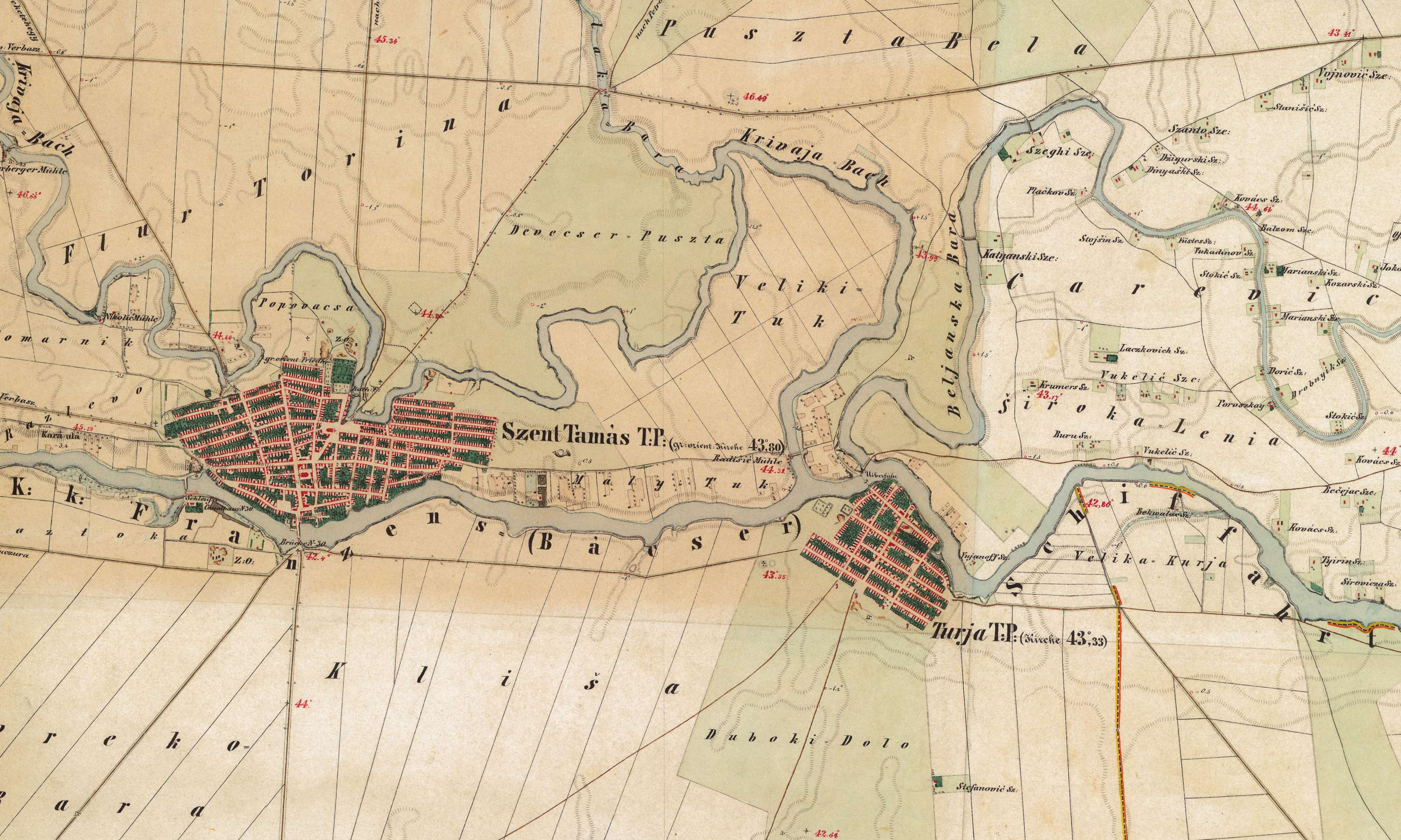
Szenttamás - Srbobran and Turia at the middle of the 19th century

Due to the natural obstacles, except the bridges mentioned above, Szenttamás can be approached by an army without any technical preparation only from Óverbász, between the Ferenc Canal and Krivaja, in a one-kilometer wide open area. To block Szenttamás from this direction, the Serbs built a defensive wall from the Ferenc Canal to Krivaja, bastioned at several projecting angles, with a wide and deep defensive ramparts, traversed by barriers on the inner side. Their small ammunition depots were built just under the breastworks. The western edge of the city was 80 paces from the breastworks. In the open area behind the breastworks, earth-covered barracks were built for the troops.

The bridge of the Ferenc Canal was blocked by a bridgehead on the right bank. As it was built on the road leading to Pétervárad, it was called the Pétervárad bridgehead. The inner side of this bridge was paved with tree trunks. Otherwise, it was built in a similar way to the Verbász ramparts.

On the north-eastern side of the city, the road to Óbecse, which crosses the bending of the Krivaja, was also blocked by ramparts. At the mouth of this bending, a rectangular defensive structure was built with round bastions at the corners. The length of each curtain wall was 50 paces, the thickness of the breastwork was 2 fathoms (3.79 m.) and the depth of the defensive ditch was 1 fathom (1.8 m). This core was surrounded by a lower outer breastwork and defensive ditch. The entrance was made in the shape of an S with a traverse. In this small fortress, food and ammunition for several days were stored. From the southwest and southeast corners of the defensive structure to the west and east branches of the Krivaja bending, a simple straight defensive wall enclosed the interior. This defensive wall was made by the Servians (Volunteers coming from the Principality of Serbia) for themselves and was called "Srbobranu" (Defender of the Serbians).

Around 400 paces to the eastern exit of Szenttamás, next to the lane leading to Turia, a small enclosed defensive structure was also built. However, as it was covered by the defenses of Turia, it was only equipped with a small cannon and was usually occupied by untrained insurgents.

The road to Bácsfeketehegy was not blocked by a separately built rampart. Here the bridge over the Krivaja and the road further on formed a deeper narrow gorge; besides, this and the whole of the foreland could be shot with cannons from behind a wall from the higher edge of the town.

The eastern entrance, over Krivaja, to Szenttamás is closed by the village of Turia. The latter is protected on the north and west sides by the Ferenc Canal, and Turia by the muddy waters of the Krivaja and Bela bara.

As Turia is attackable from the south-east as well as from the south-west, the Serbs have also built small earthworks along the insignificant fence walls. Those who wanted to go to the Roman ramparts (Note: defensive works from the ancient times, stretching between the Danube and the Tisza from Apatin to Bácsföldvár, used very successfully by the Serbs against the Hungarians during the 1848-1849 revolutionary war) from Szenttamás they had to cross Turia.

The Szőreg farm is located on the marshy bank of the Almáska bara. Here is the shortest road from Óbecse to Pétervárad. At the farm, the Serbs built a rectangular enclosed structure, facing Ókér and Temerin, for 200 men and 2 guns, and named it "Na Sirigu".

In this way, Szenttamás, Turia, and the Szőreg major formed a fortified triangle.

Szenttamás was the most easily accessible from the Verbász ramparts. That is why the Serbs made the most efforts to defend this line.

Between Szenttamás and Turia, the enclosed area between the Krivaja and the Ferenc Canal was a pasture in 1848. North of Szenttamás, the fields beyond the Krivaja were planted with corn, which had grown so much that in some places the rider could barely see out of it.

== Siege ==
The troops arrived in front of the town at about the same time, and at about 8 a.m. the Hungarian artillery started shelling the entrenchments from both sides. The right column drew 6 guns from the reserve, and now 12 guns were firing at the Serb positions. Together with the guns brought from the reserve to the Pétervárad bridgehead, the 12 Hungarian guns were deployed in a semicircle, in three separate groups of 4-4 guns. The infantry battalions were placed in the interspaces between these cannon groups, and as we can deduce from the events of the battle, they were placed in the following order: the 7th Infantry Battalion was on the right wing, leaning on the canal, the Turszky battalion was on the left flank, while the Szeged volunteers were in the center. Little is known about the combat formation of the left column. Based on the battle formation of the earlier siege operations and the shape of the terrain, given that the Wasa Battalion attacked the western entrance to Szenttamás, it is likely that the artillery was deployed on both sides of this battalion, the 5th and 8th Battalions, which suffered the most casualties, were deployed on the flanks, while the National Guard Battalion and the Cavalry Company were deployed as general reserves at the rear. Of the reserve troops, the 5 cavalry companies, moving along the road to Turia, raised a cloud of great dust, which the wind drove onto the bridgehead. The National Guard battalion was positioned behind the left flank, facing the canal.

The Hungarian batteries poured shells into the enemy entrenchments. But the enemy did not enter in panic but returned fire with vigor. In the meantime, the 7th Honvéd Battalion attacked the bridgehead along the road to Turia, behind an advanced skirmish line. However, they were repulsed by the Serb reserve troops. The repeated bayonet assaults that followed were each time shipwrecked by the stubborn resistance and fusillade of the Serbs, and it seemed as if the reputation of the impregnability of the Szenttamás entrenchments was about to be confirmed again. However, due to the continuous shelling by the Hungarians, at one point a 3-pounder gun of the Serbs was hit, becoming unusable. On top of this, at about 9 a.m. a Hungarian shell blew up the ammunition magazine of the Pétervárad bridgehead. Thanks to these the Hungarian batteries advanced and fired at the defenders with grapeshot.

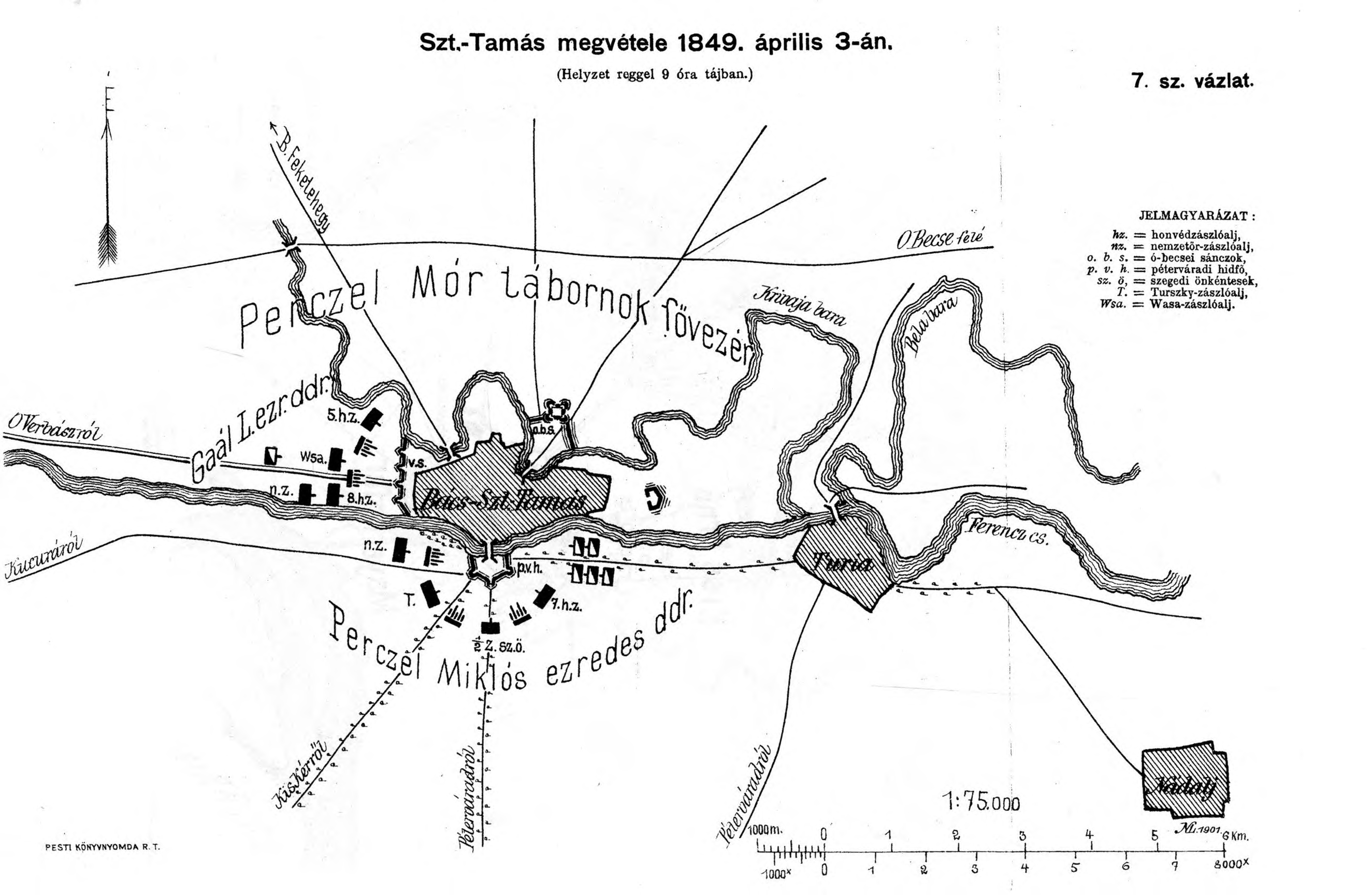
Map of the fourth siege of Szenttamás (3 April 1849) hz. = Honvéd battalion nz. = National Guard battalion o.b.s. = Óbecse ramparts p.v.h. = Pétervárad bridgehead sz.ö. = Szeged volunteers T. = Turszky battalion Wsa. = Wasa battalion

First, the 1st squad of the 7th Battalion, under the command of Captain Bach, managed to reach the trench, and from there, together with the Szeged volunteers under the leadership of Major Sándor Földváry, they quickly reached the breastworks. The Serbian soldiers near the entrance to the bridgehead retreated from the breastworks and ran towards the bridge over the canal. Captain Stefanović rushed there and stopped them, forcing them back to their previous position, but at this moment Captain Bach was already on the breastworks with his men and drove the Serbs back with a bayonet charge. Seeing this, Major Sándor Földváry, the commander of the 1/2 Battalion of the Szeged Volunteers, snatched the flag from the hands of the flag bearer and with a shout of "forward, boys!" he rushed at the head of his troops up the battlements. Then the battalion of the 62nd Turszky Infantry Regiment broke into the camp at the Pétervárad bridgehead, and the defenders were driven towards the bridge over the Ferenc Canal. The defenders routed towards the bridge of the canal. The 7th Honvéd Battalion followed in hot pursuit. Many of them fell into the canal, where they died, and many of them were shot by the Honvéds. The bridgehead was in Hungarian hands at 10:30 a.m. The Serbs retreating into the town, fired continuously from the houses trying to prevent the Hungarians to cross the canal's bridge. But the Serbs were driven out also from there and, fleeing from street to street, they rushed to the Óbecse ramparts, where the unarmed inhabitants had also fled, to run towards Óbecse by carriage or on foot.

The Verbas entrenchments were defended by Captain Bosnić's border guards from Pétervárad and the armed Serb inhabitants of Szenttamás. Colonel Gaál, after fierce cannonading, made two assaults on the entrenchments, and in the same time the Wasa infantry battalion attacked the western entrance to Szenttamás; but the 5th and 8th Honvéd battalions suffered considerable losses, and failed to break into the entrenchments. It was only when the Serbs fighting here were informed of what was happening on the southern side that they gave up further resistance, to avoid being caught between two fires. But the most bitter part of the battle came only afterwards, within the city walls, and it almost escalated into a massacre. Neither side showed mercy to the other. A terrible massacre raged in the streets of Szenttamás. The determined Hungarians unleashed their unrelenting fury on the Serbs, while the Serbs desperately defended themselves. Then finally, the Serbs, realizing that all their efforts were in vain, fled in all directions, pursued vigorously by the Hungarian hussars who had also arrived at the scene of the battle. The defenders of the entrenchments broke out of the Szenttamás camp through the Krivaja, but many of them died in the muddy waters.

Others jumped into the Ferenc Canal and tried to escape towards Kiskér, but there they fell under the arms of the reserve and cavalry troops. The great mass, men, women, old men and children, ran towards Óbecse. The only way out was through the ramparts, via the Srbobran redoubt, and there was a great crowding and confusion as the crowd fled towards Óbecse. Unfortunately, the Hungarian soldiers' thirst for revenge for the Serb atrocities of the previous months, in which thousands of Hungarian civilians fell victims (most notorious the Massacre of Zenta from 1–3 February 1849), now did not spare the Serb civilians either, and they only stopped the massacre when the government commissioner Count Kázmér Batthyány and the Hungarian officers, who had rushed to the scene, stopped it.

== Aftermath ==
In his analysis of the siege, Ödön Olchváry notes that during the capture of Szenttamás, the attacking columns attacked the Verbász ramparts and the Pétervárad bridgehead with almost equal force. But while the strength of the troops fighting at the bridgehead was proportional to the size of the bridgehead, the Verbász ramparts would have required more troops. The Serbs were expecting danger from the Verbász battlements, and these defensive walls were defended by the heroic Teodor Bosnić, who had already successfully defended Szenttamás twice before. Captain Jovan Stefanović Vilovski had taken command of the bridgehead only two days before; therefore, the troops did not trust him too much and were not very attached to him as they had to Bosnić.

According to György Klapka, the Serbs lost 2,000 men, and according to other, more plausible sources, around 1,000, but this figure must also include the lives of civilians, women, and innocent children. In addition, 5 guns, several flags, and a large amount of armament fell into the possession of the Hungarians. According to historian Róbert Hermann the Serbs lost 2,000–4,000 men, and 6 guns were captured by the Hungarians. According to József Bánlaky, the Hungarian losses in dead and wounded did not exceed 200, while according to Ödön Olchváry, it far exceeded it. According to Róbert Hermann the Hungarians lost 22 dead and 100 wounded soldiers. Szenttamás was burned on the same day, and the entrenchments, the symbol of the three Hungarian failed sieges, were destroyed at the order of Perczel on 4 and 5 April.

The capture of Szenttamás was also an important psychological success. The three unsuccessful sieges in the summer and autumn of 1848 made the fortress a symbol of Serbian resistance in the eyes of the public. Its capture signaled that the Hungarian army was capable of putting down the Serbian rebellion and thus bringing peace to a much-suffered part of the country.

On 6 April two Hungarian columns marched to conquer the Šajkaška District. One column, under the command of Colonel Gaál, marched towards Csurog, to occupy this place and to observe Bácsföldvár, Óbecse and the left bank of the Tisza. The other column, under the command of Mór Perczel, marched towards Goszpodince against the Roman ramparts.

The enthusiasm in the Hungarian troops and the impact of the victorious battles of the Hungarian offensive in Southern Hungary, which had begun, under the leadership of General Mór Perczel in March, boosted the mood. The squadrons and companies were led by proven officers, famous for their talent and bravery. The commander-in-chief, Mór Perczel, although not the most talented of the commanders of the Hungarian War of Independence, was not lacking in courage, determination, and purposefulness.

== Sources ==
- Bánlaky, József (2001). A magyar nemzet hadtörténelme ("The Military History of the Hungarian Nation) (in Hungarian). Budapest: Arcanum Adatbázis.
- Bóna, Gábor (1987). Tábornokok és törzstisztek a szabadságharcban 1848–49 ("Generals and Staff Officers in the War of Freedom 1848–1849") (in Hungarian). Budapest: Zrínyi Katonai Kiadó. p. 430. ISBN 963-326-343-3.
- Hermann, Róbert (2001), 1848-1849 a szabadságharc hadtörténete ("Military History of 1848-1849") (in Hungarian), Budapest: Korona, ISBN 963-9376-21-3
- Hermann, Róbert (2004). Az 1848–1849-es szabadságharc nagy csatái ("Great battles of the Hungarian Revolution of 1848-1849") (in Hungarian). Budapest: Zrínyi. p. 408. ISBN 963-327-367-6.
- Olchváry, Ödön (1999). A magyar függetlenségi harc 1848-1849-ben a Délvidéken (in Hungarian). Budapest: Márkus Samu Könyvnyomdája.
