= Ahmednagar Fort =

Fort in the city of Ahmednagar, India

Ahmednagar fort
- Ahmednagar, Maharashtra
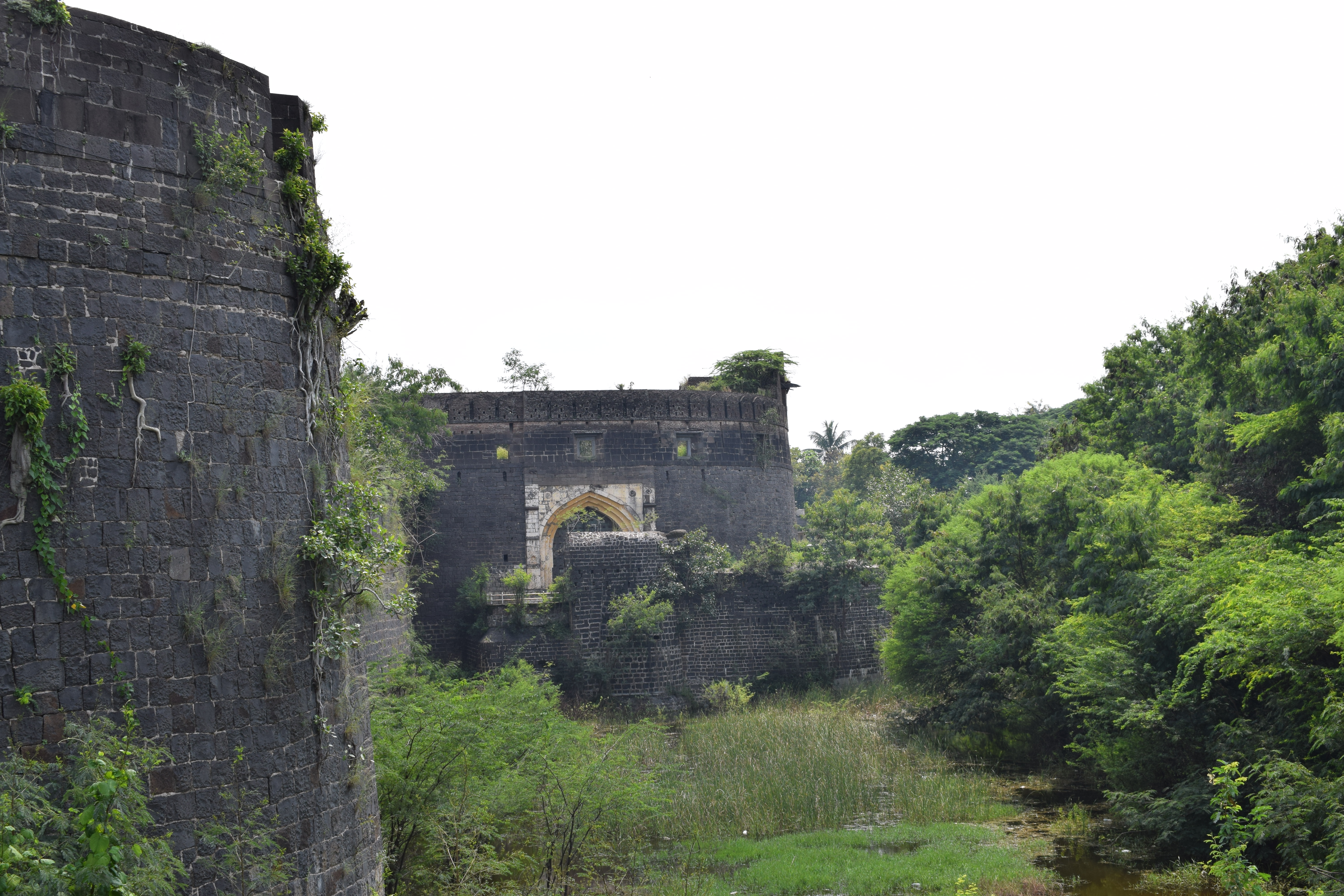

Site information
- Type: Land fort
- Owner: Indian military
- Controlled by: Ahmadnagar Sultanate (1562–1600); Mughal Empire (1600–1724); Hyderabad (1724–1759); Maratha Empire (1759–1803); United Kingdom: East India Company (1803–1857); India (1857–1947); India (1947–)

Location
- Shown within Maharashtra
- Location within Maharashtra Location within India
- Coordinates: 19°05′41.3″N 74°45′19.7″E

Site history
- In use: Capital headquarter of Ahmednagar Sultanate
- Materials: Basalt, granite, lime mortar
- Battles/wars: Siege of Ahmednagar

Garrison information
- Past commanders: Ahmad Nizam Shah, Chand Bibi, Aurangzeb
- Occupants: Nana Phadanvis, Jawaharlal Nehru, Abul Kalam Azad, Sardar Patel

The Ahmednagar Fort (Ahmadnagar Qila) is located close to the Bhingar Nala near Ahmednagar in Maharashtra state western India. It was the headquarters of the Ahmednagar Sultanate. In 1803, it was taken by the British during the Second Anglo-Maratha War. It was used as a prison during the British Raj. Currently, the fort is under the administration of the Armoured Corps of the Indian Army.

== Major features ==
In 1803, the Ahmednagar Fort was round in appearance, with twenty-four bastions, one large gate, and three small sally ports. It had a glacis, no covered way; a ditch, faced with stone on both sides, about 18 feet (5.5 m) wide, with 9 feet (2.7 m) water all around, which only reached within 6 or 7 feet (1.8 or 2.1 m) of the top of the scarp; long reeds grew in it all around. The berm was only about one yard wide. The rampart was of black hewn stone, and the parapet was of lime-plastered brick; both together appeared from the crest of the glacis to be only as high as the pole of a field-officer's tent. The bastions were all about 4.5 feet (1.4 m) feet higher; they were round. One of them had eight guns in a barbette mounting, pointing eastward; all the rest had jingals, four in each. In 1803 two guns were visible in each bastion, and 200 were said to be ready in the fort to be mounted.

A gunshot to the west of the fort was the Pettah of Ahmednagar. The main gate of the fort faced the pettah, and was defended by a small half-circular work, with one traverse and several little towers for men. There was a wooden bridge over the ditch, which could be taken away in time of war, but there was no drawbridge mechanism. It was reported that an iron trough as large as the bridge, could be placed upon it, or on the supporters of it, and filled with charcoal or other combustibles, which would then be set on fire as an enemy approached. The fort is also called as Bhuikot Killa which means it is a land fort and is not constructed on any hill. It should not be confused with other Bhuikot Killas in Maharashtra like Solapur Bhuikot Killa.

A small river came from the northward, round the west side of the pettah, and passed to the southward of the fort. A nullah (steep-sided valley) also passed from the northward, between the fort and a town called Bhingar, about a gunshot to the eastward, and joined the river. A potential defensive weakness was a little hill or rising ground close to and east of Bhingar, from which shot from siege guns could reach the fort.

Two rills or covered aqueducts came from the hills, a mile or more to the north, passed through and supplied the pettah and the town, and then went into the fort, either under or through the ditch, into which the wastewater fell.

There were no passages across the ditch from the sally ports, and no part of the aqueducts appeared above the ditch. The nullah mentioned above had steep banks and passed within 60 yards of the fort; the aqueduct from Bhingar passed under it. There was no bridge or even a prominent crossing point at the nullah and hence no clearly defined route between the fort and the town of Bhingar.

There were many small pagodas and mosques around the pettah and the fort, but none exactly between, or between the fort and Bhingar, or nearer to the fort than those towns.

== History ==
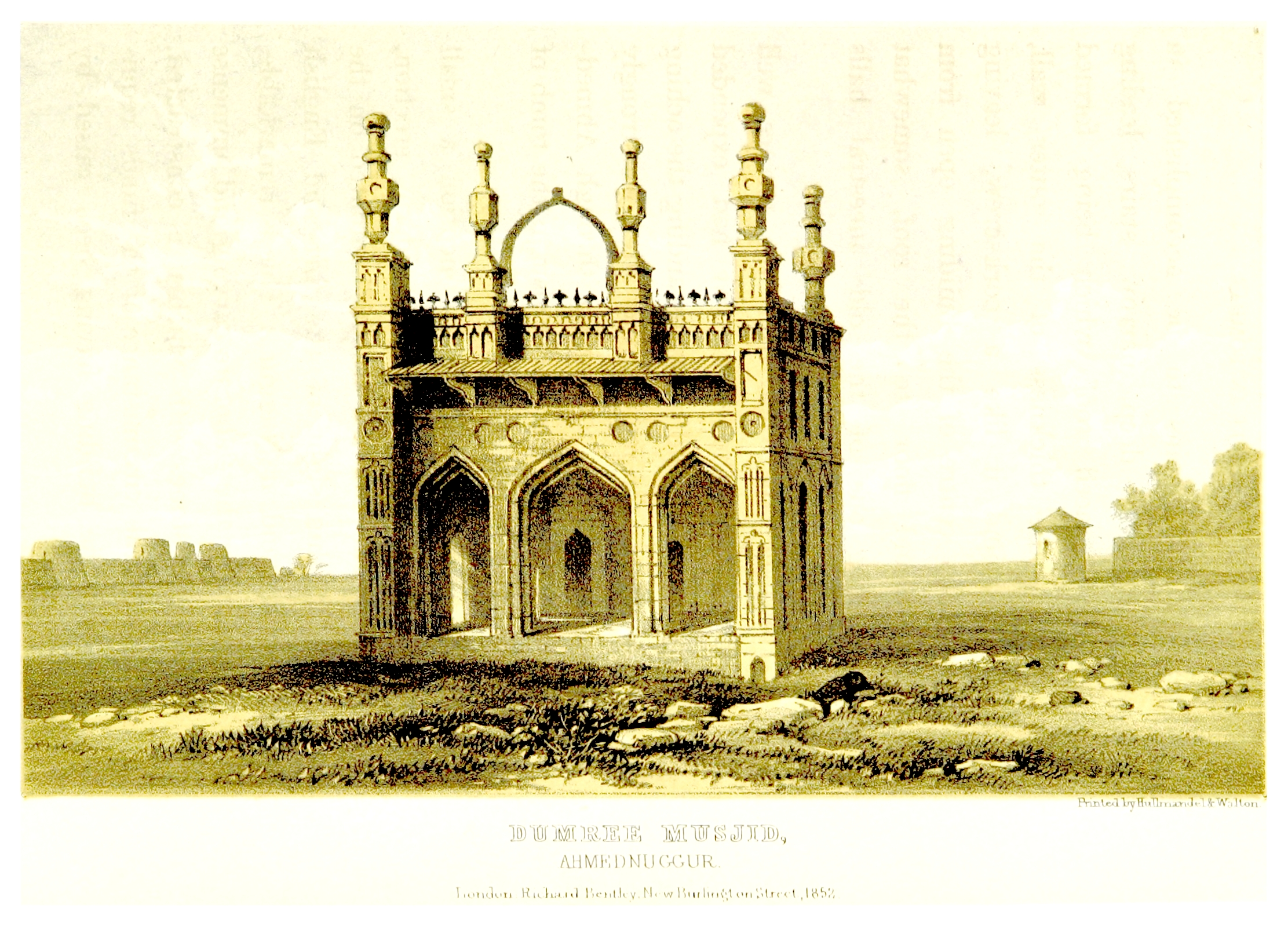
Dumree Musjid, with Ahmednagar Fort in the background on the left side

The fort was built by Malik Ahmad Nizam Shah I (after whom the city of Ahmednagar is named) in 1427. He was the first sultan of the Nizam Shahi dynasty and he built the fort to defend the city against invaders from neighbouring Idar. Initially it was made of mud but major fortification began in 1559 under Hussain Nizam Shah. It took four years and was finally finished in 1563. In February 1596, Chand Bibi the queen regent successfully repulsed the Mughal invasion but when Akbar attacked again in 1600 the fort went to the Mughals.

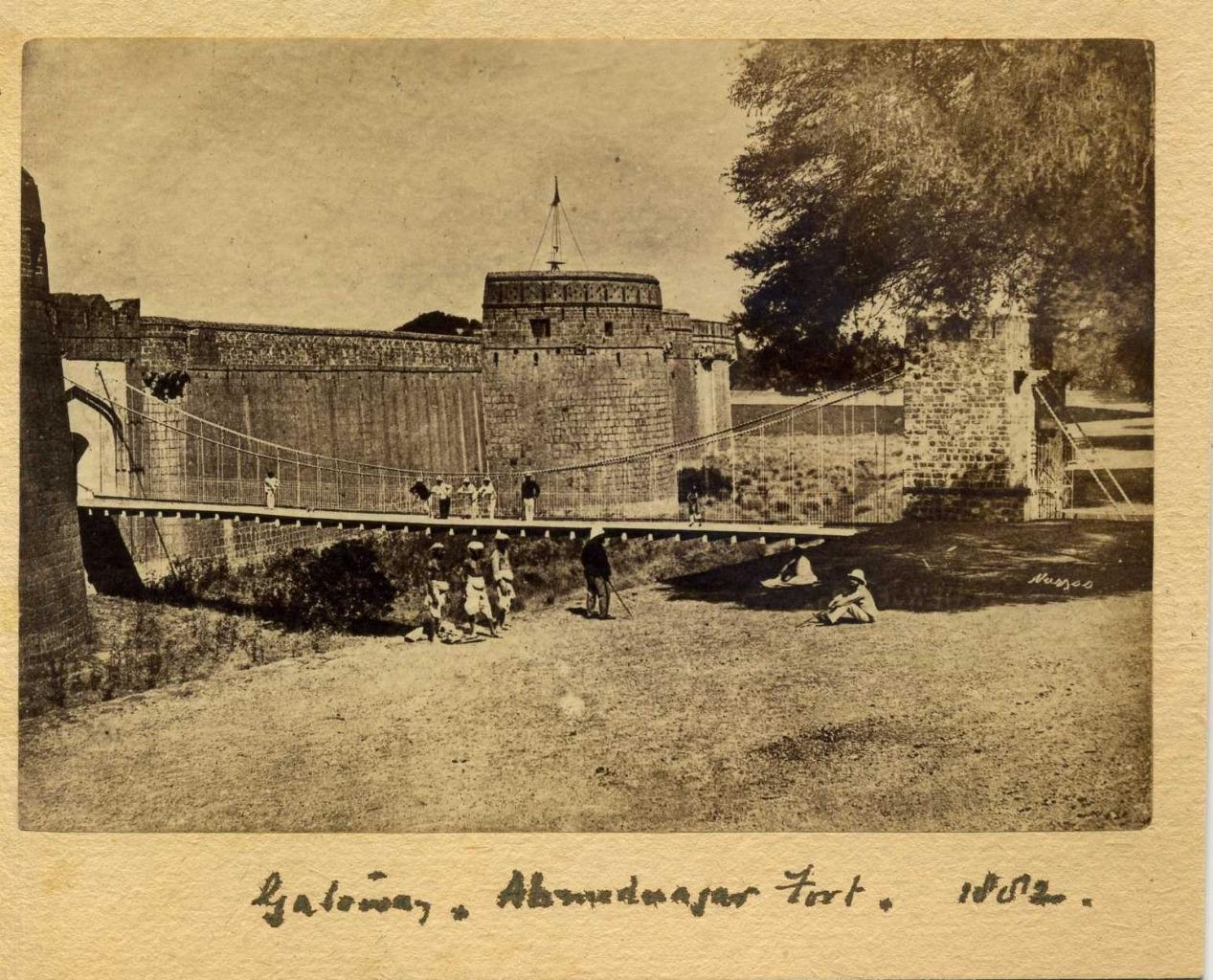
Gateway of Ahmednagar fort India, 1882

Aurangzeb died near Ahmednagar fort at the age of 88 on 3 March 1707. After Aurangzeb's death, the fort passed to the Nizams in 1724, to Marathas in 1759 and later the Scindias in 1790. During the period of instability in the Maratha Empire following the death of Madhavrao II, Daulat Scindia had the fort and its surrounding region ceded to him. In 1797, he imprisoned Nana Phadanvis the Peshwa diplomat at Ahmednagar fort.

In 1803, during the Second Anglo-Maratha War, Arthur Wellesley defeated the Maratha forces and the East India Company came into possession of the fort.

== Modern era ==
The fort was known as Ahmednagar Fort and was used by the British Raj as a prison and this was where Jawaharlal Nehru, Maulana Azad, Vallabhbhai Patel and nine other members of the Indian National Congress were detained for almost three years after they passed the Quit India Resolution. Jawaharlal Nehru wrote his popular book -the Discovery of India- while he was imprisoned at the fort. During the same time, Congress leader, Maulana Abul Kalam Azad also compiled his acclaimed "Ghubar-e-Khatir" (Sallies of Mind) (Urdu: غبار خاطر) which is considered as the best example of "Epistolary Essays" in Urdu literature.

During the same time, Odisha's first Chief-Minister and ex-Governor of undivided Bombay State, Harekrushna Mahatab also compiled three volumes of the History of Odisha in Odia. This has later been translated and published in English and Hindi.

Currently, the fort is under the administration of the Armoured Corps of the Indian Army.

== Gallery ==
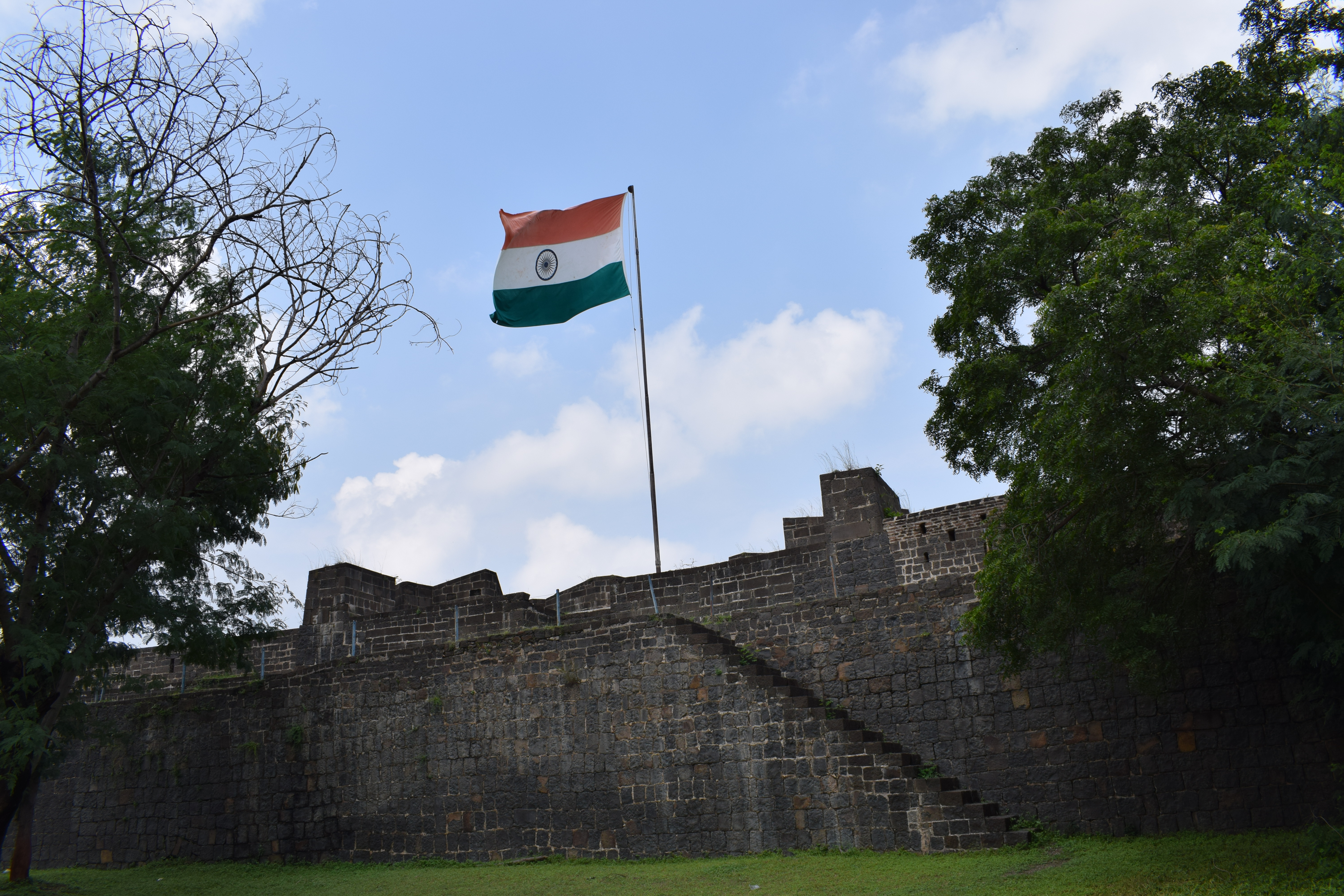
Ahmednagar Fort with the national flag

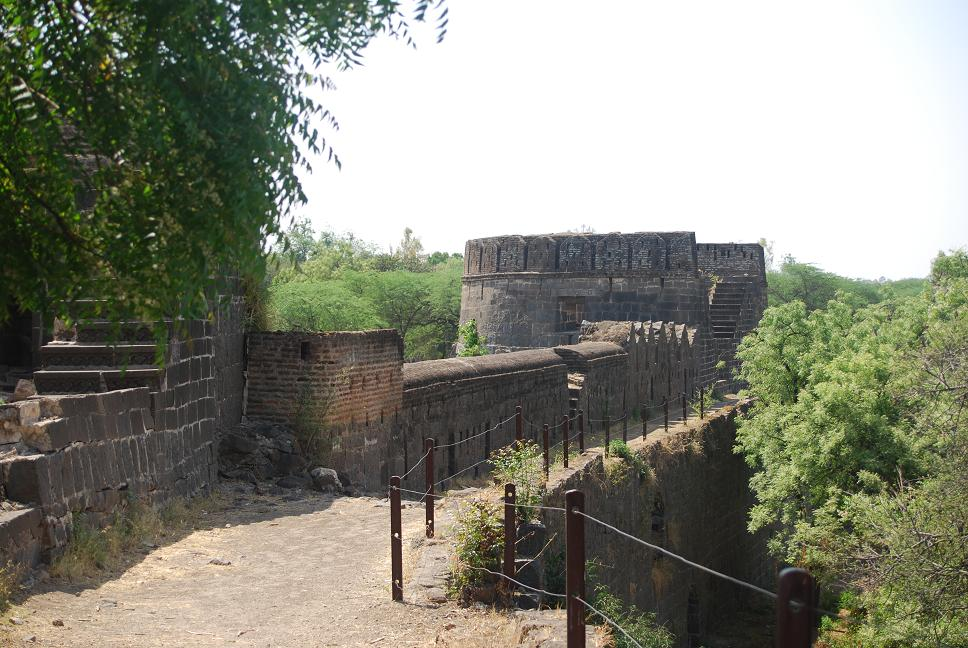
Ahmednagar Fort ramparts

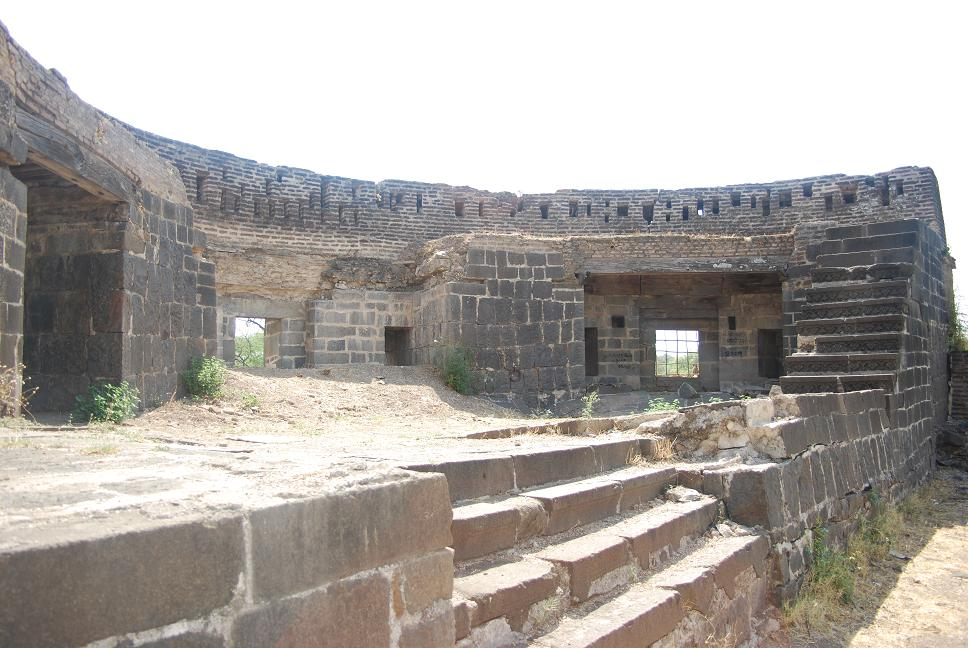
Ahmednagar Fort bastion area

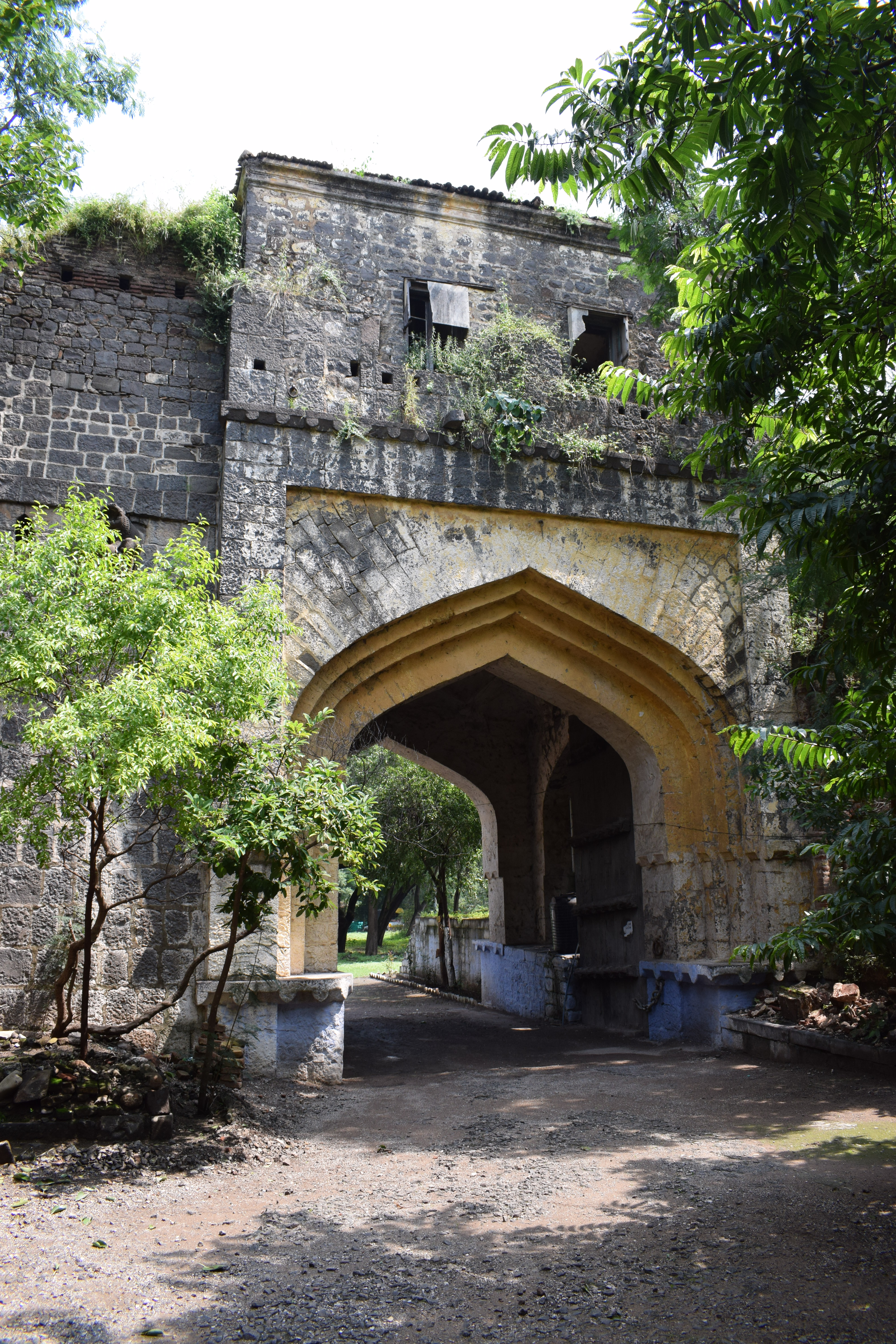
Inside view of Ahmednagar Fort's gate

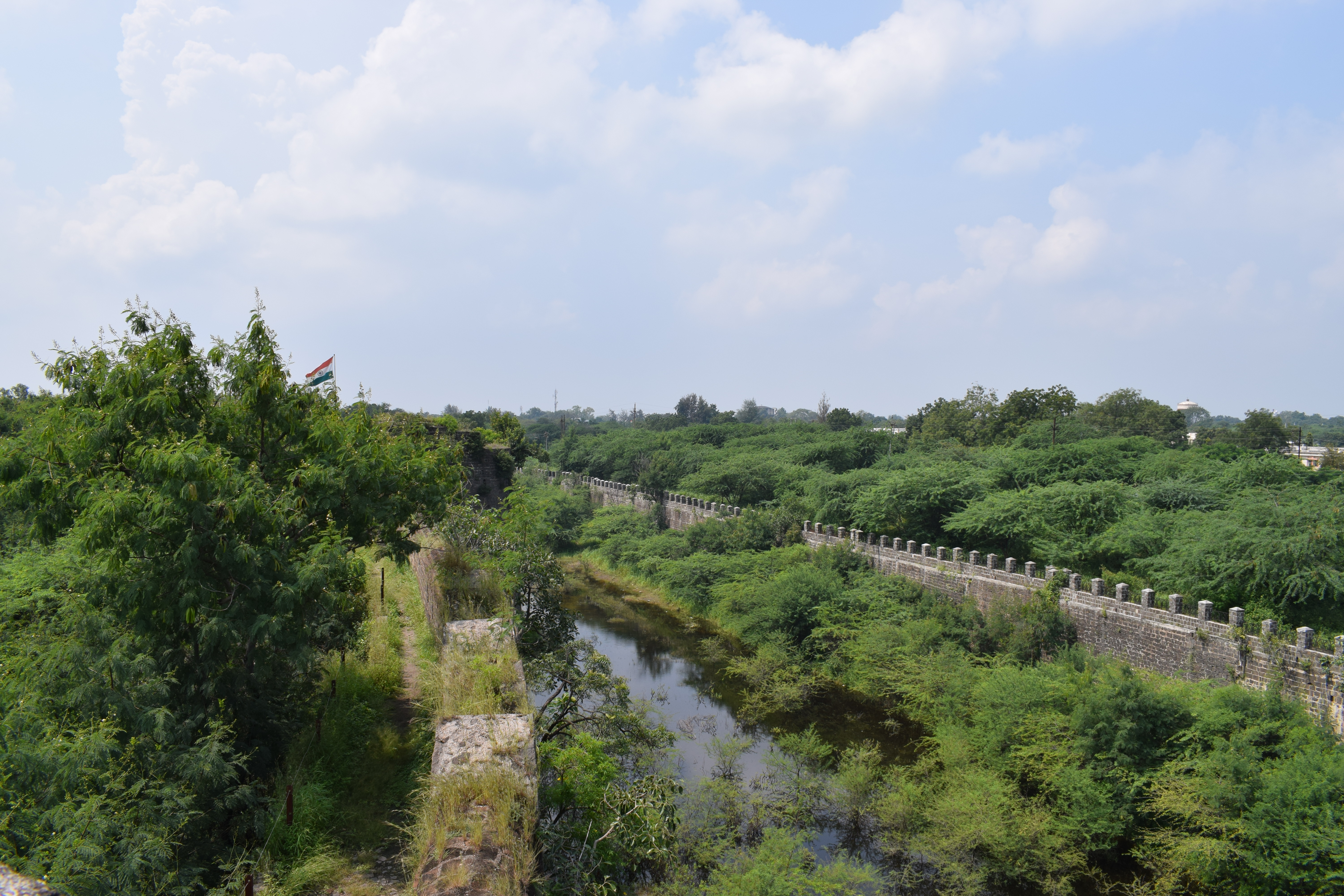
Part of the moat around Ahmednagar Fort

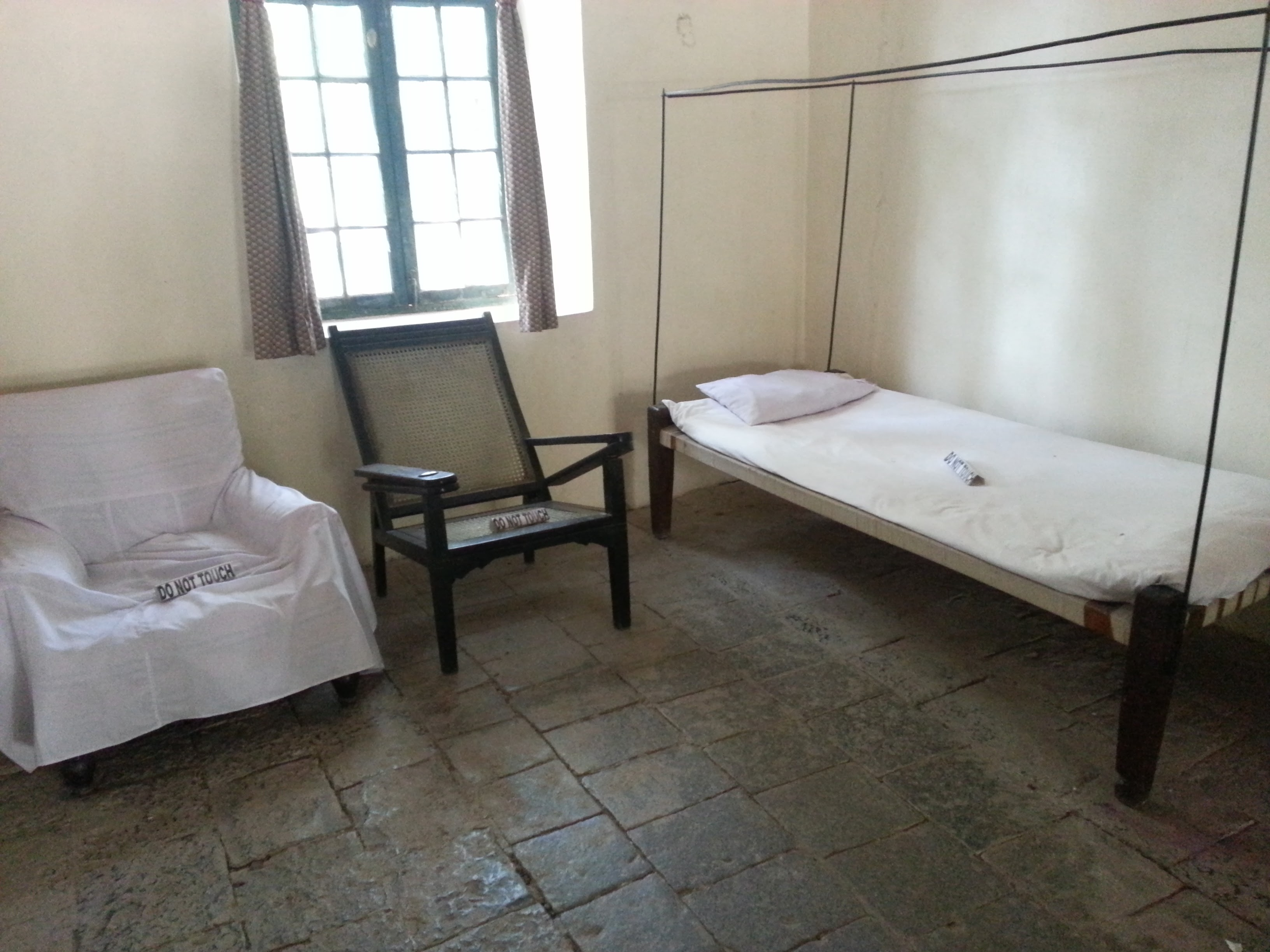
Jawaharlal Nehru's room during his incarceration (1942–1945)

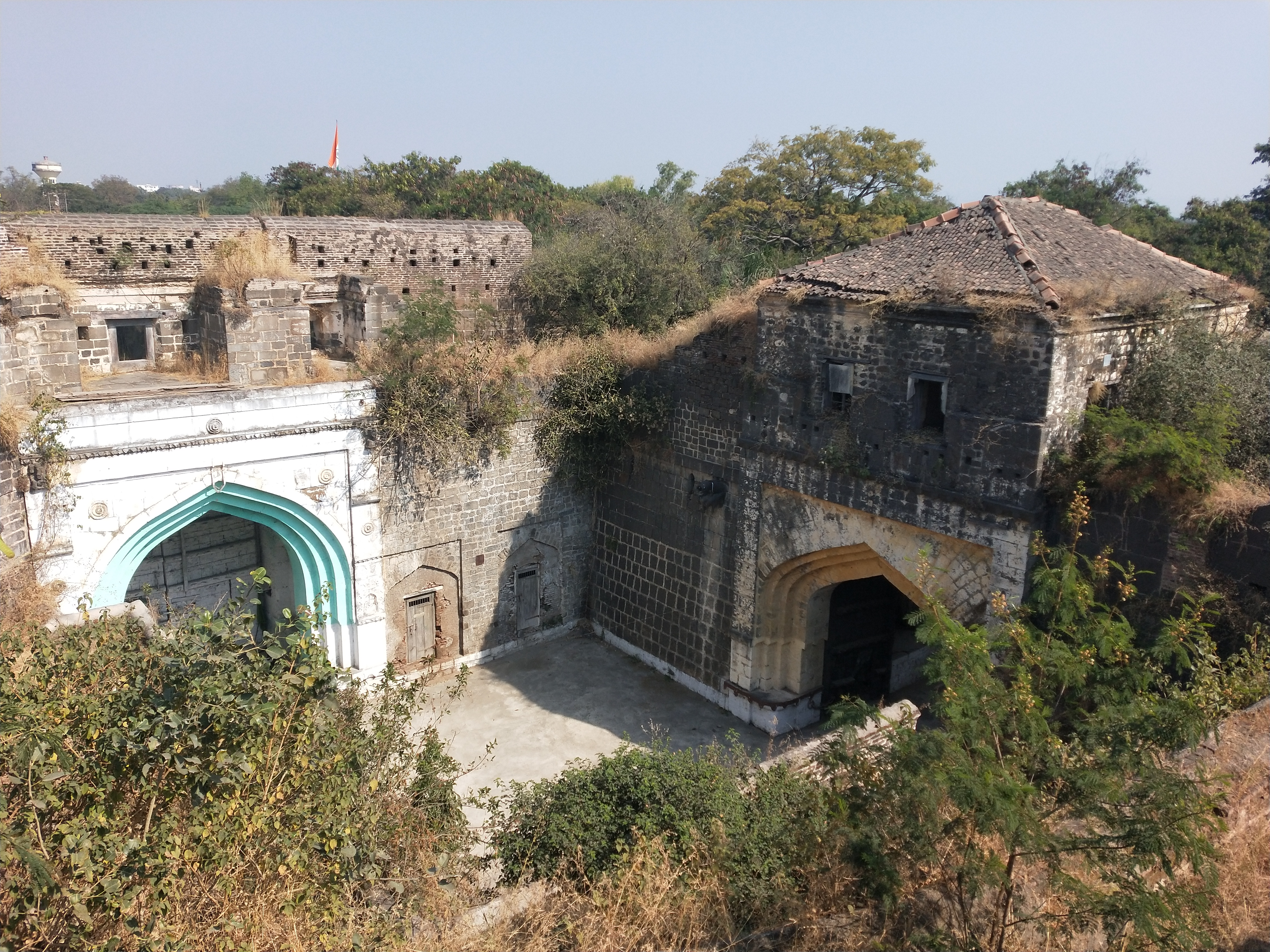
Main entrance passage

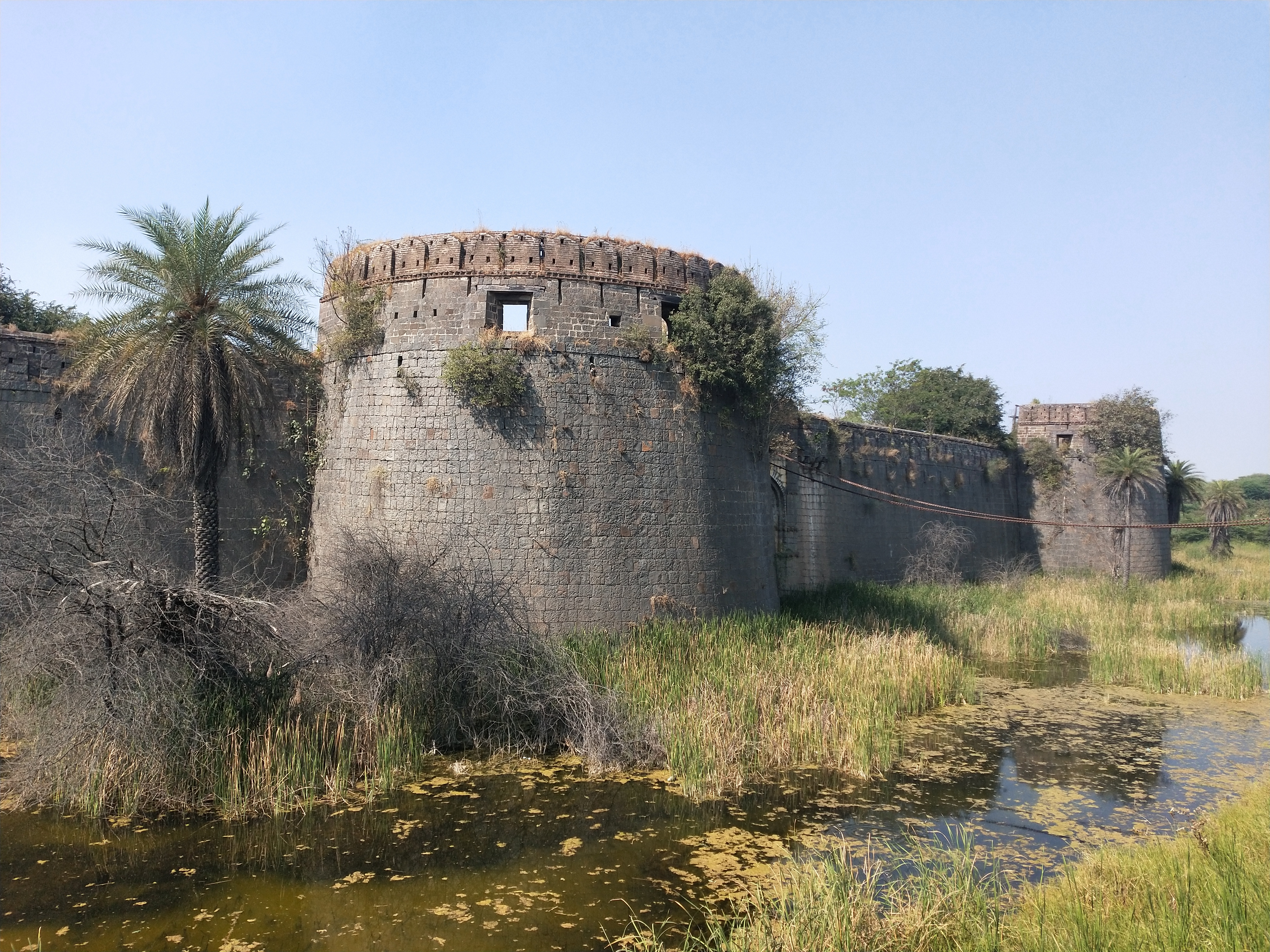
Bastion and fortification

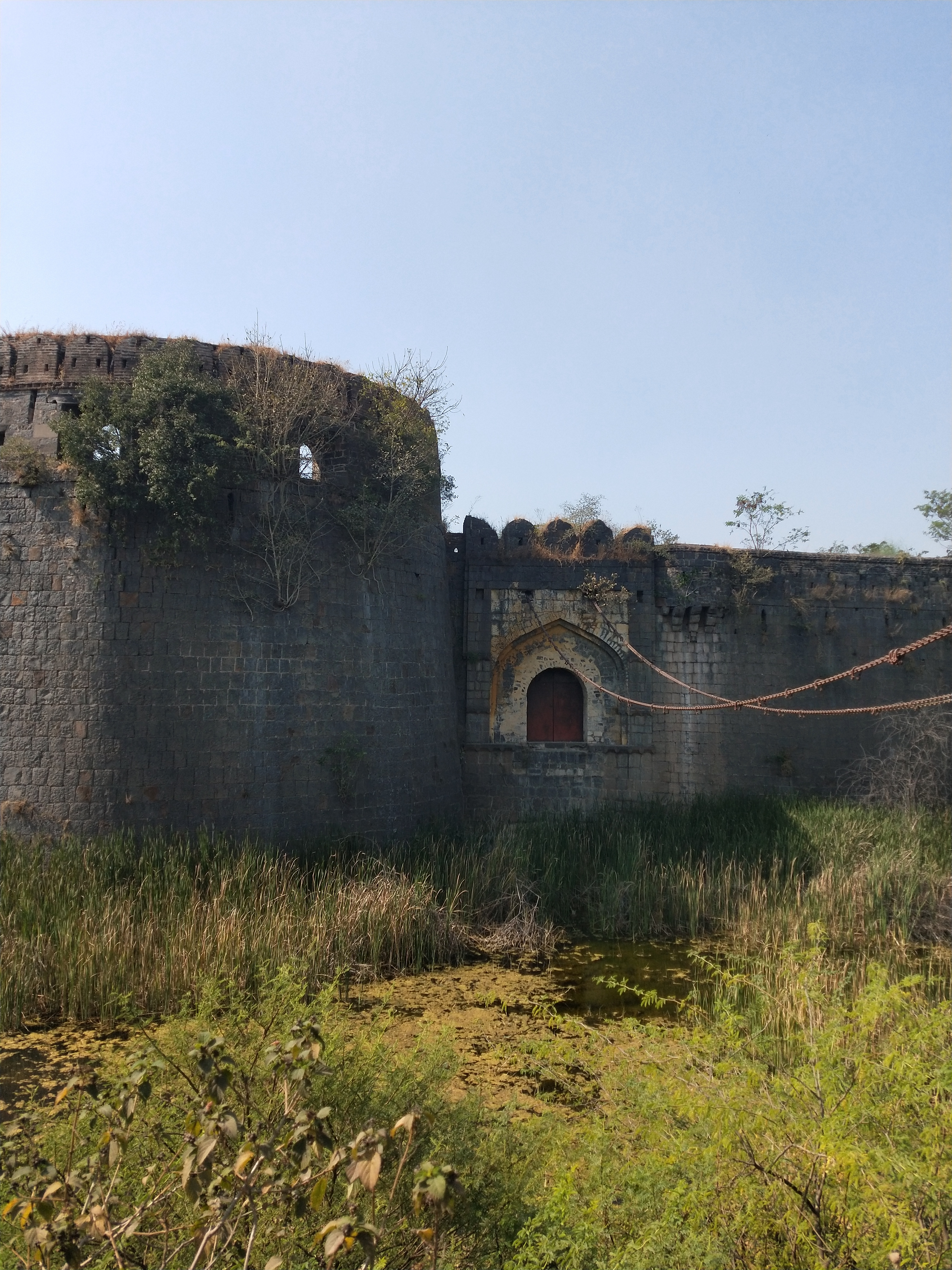
Secondary gate

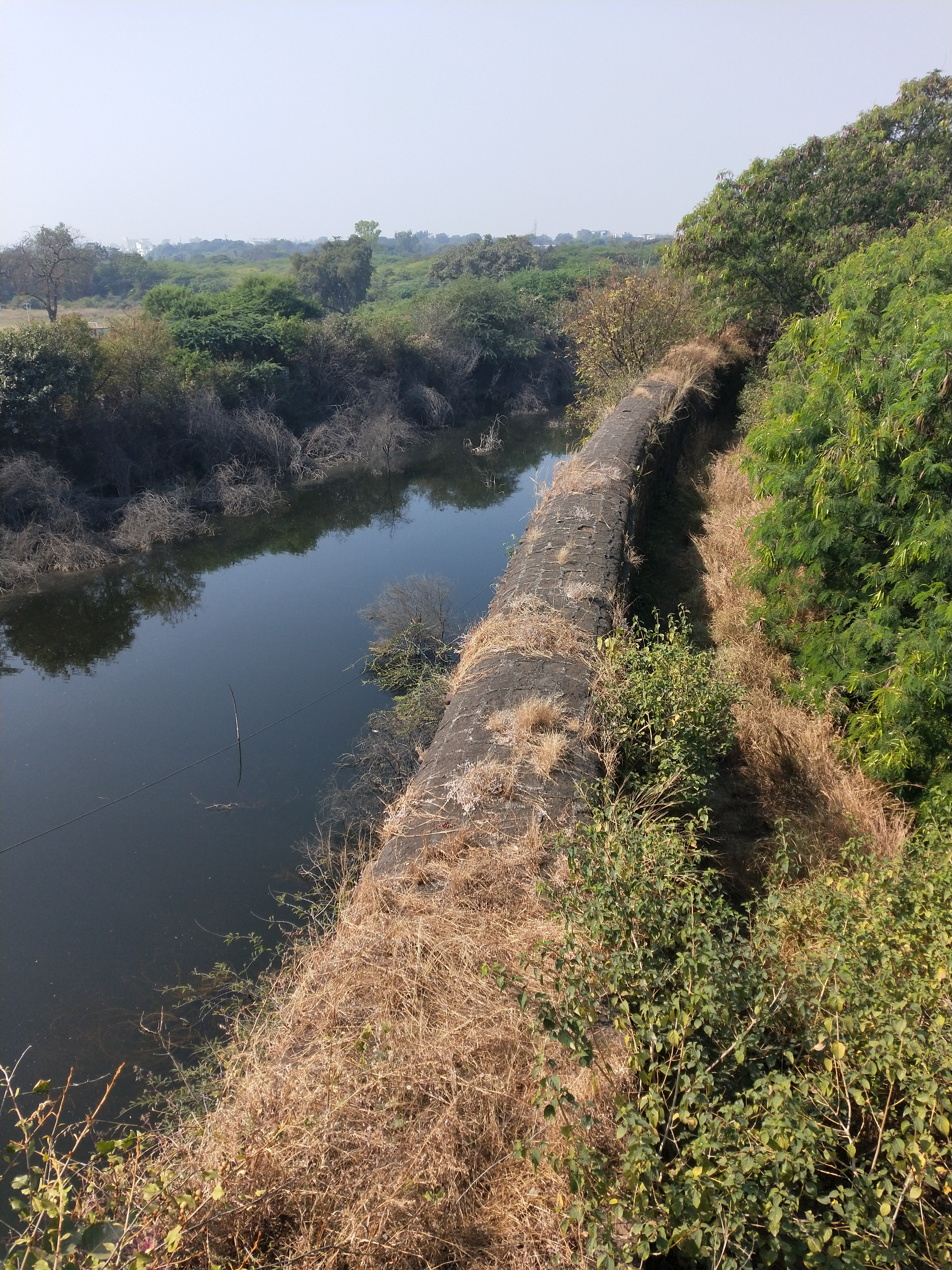
Fortification

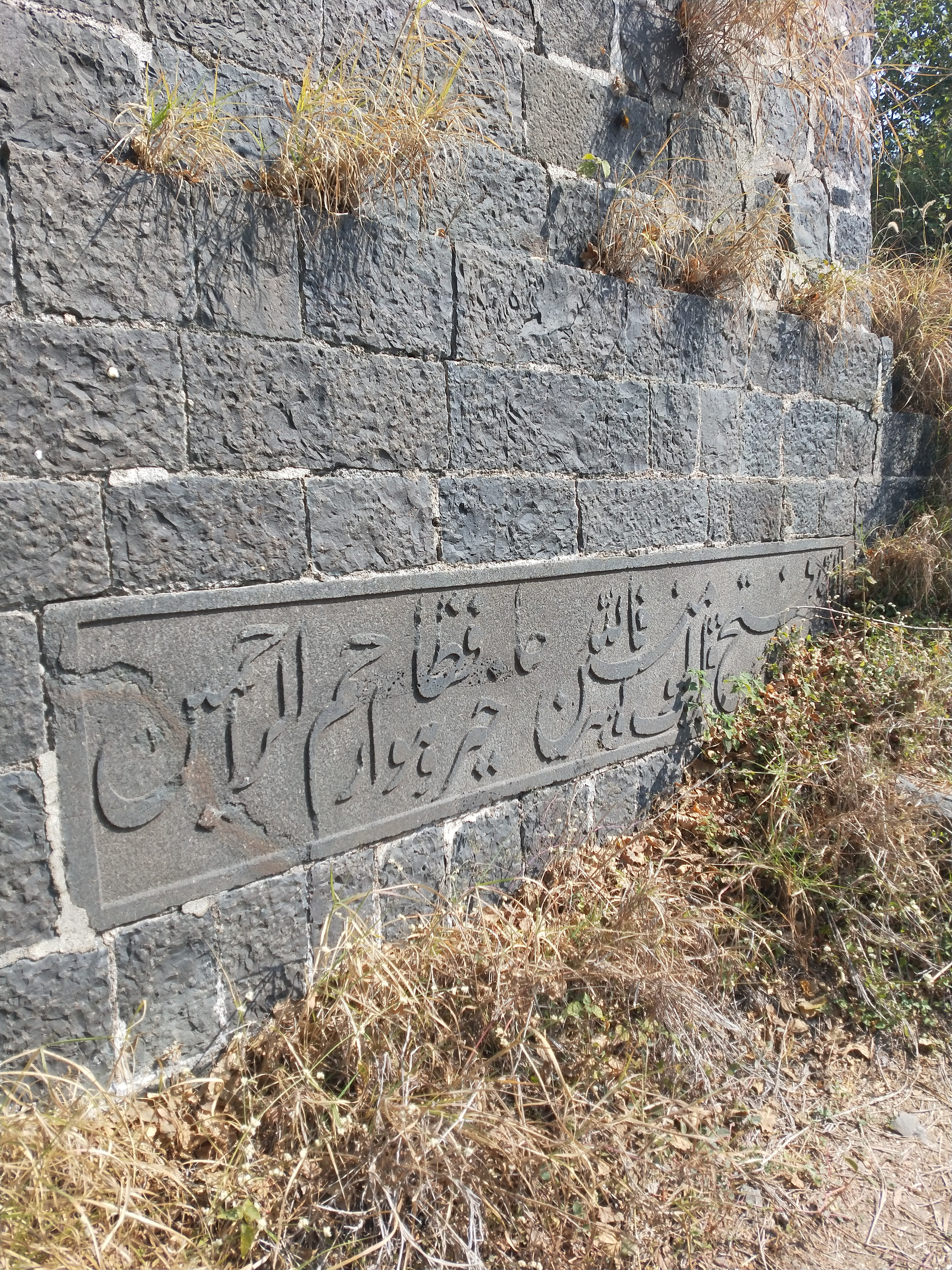
Inscription in Persian language

== See also ==
- List of forts in Maharashtra
- Daulatabad fort (Devgiri)
- Paranda fort
- Bagh Rauza (Ahmed nizam Shah's tomb)
- Farah bagh
- Damri masjid
- Salabat Khan tomb
