= Siege of Ahmednagar (1803) =

1803 Second Anglo-Maratha War siege

Siege of Ahmadnagar
- Part of the Second Anglo-Maratha War
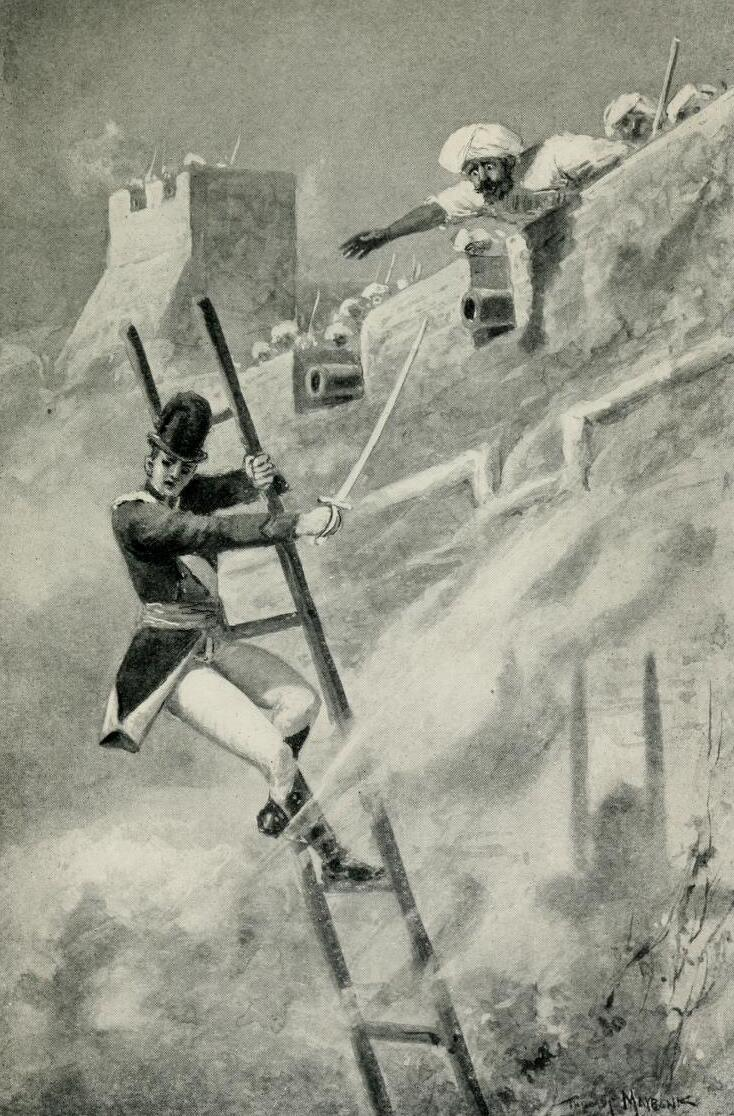
- British illustration of the siege
Date	8–12 August 1803 (4 days)
Location	Ahmednagar Fort, Maharashtra, India 19°05′41.3″N 74°45′19.7″E
Result	British victory
Territorial changes	British East India Company captures Ahmednagar Fort

Belligerents
British Empire: East India Company	Maratha Empire

Commanders and leaders
Arthur Wellesley	Daulat Rao Scindia

Strength
24,000	5,000

Casualties and losses
9 killed 14 wounded	250 killed
- Shown within Maharashtra Ahmednagar (India)

The siege of Ahmednagar was the first battle of the Second Anglo-Maratha War fought between the Maratha Confederacy and the British East India Company. When he determined that a long defensive war would ruin his army, Wellesley decided to act boldly to defeat the numerically larger force of the Marathas.

With the logistic assembly of his army complete (24,000 men in total) he gave the order to break camp and attack the nearest Maratha fort on 8 August 1803. Wellesley's first move was to take the walled Pettah of Ahmednagar (town adjacent to the fort) by escalade, on the same day (the 8 August).

The Ahmednagar Fort surrendered on 12 August after an infantry attack had exploited an artillery-made breach in the wall. With the pettah and fort now in British control Wellesley was able to extend control southwards to the river Godavari.
