= Maulana Sherwani =

Indian Islamic scholar and statesman

Nawab Maulana Habibur Rahman Khan Sherwani Sadr Yar Jung Bahadur
- Born: 5 January 1867; Bhikam Pur, Aligarh district, North-Western Provinces, British India
- Died: 11 August 1950 (aged 83); Aligarh, Uttar Pradesh, India
- Education: Agra College
- Occupations: Islamic scholar, author, statesman, academic administrator
- Known for: Sadr-us-Sudur of Hyderabad State; first Vice-Chancellor of Osmania University; addressee of Ghubar-e-Khatir

Maulana Habibur Rahman Khan Sherwani (5 January 1867 – 11 August 1950) also known as Nawab Sadr Yar Jung Bahadur was an Islamic scholar, author, and statesman in British India. He is recognized for his literary relationship with Maulana Abul Kalam Azad and his administrative role as the Sadr-us-Sudur (Minister of Religious Affairs) in the Hyderabad State.

== Early life and education ==
Born into a Afghan lineage in the village of Bhikam Pur, near Aligarh, Uttar Pradesh, he received his formal early education at Agra College. Concurrently, he completed religious and theological training under the guidance of the scholar Maulana Lutfullah Aligarhi. He was a linguist who spoke Urdu, Arabic, and Persian, and was one of the Persian-knowing scholars of the Indian subcontinent.

== Career and literary work ==
Sherwani was an administrative and academic official in British India. Following the death of Sir Syed Ahmad Khan, he served as the permanent secretary of the All India Muhammadan Educational Conference, participating in elevating the Muhammadan Anglo-Oriental College into what is now Aligarh Muslim University (AMU). He served as AMU's very first Head of the Department of Theology.

In 1918, he transitioned to the princely state of Hyderabad, where he participated in establishing Osmania University, serving as its first Vice-Chancellor from 1918 to 1919. He then spent thirteen years serving as Hyderabad's Sadr-us-Sudur (Minister for Religious Affairs). In 1922, the Nizam of Hyderabad conferred upon him the title of Nawab Sadr Yar Jung Bahadur.

As an author, he published roughly two dozen books covering Islamic history and theology, including Ulama-e-Salaf, Sirat-us-Siddiq, and Tazkira Babar. His personal library, Kutub Khana Ganj, contained a collection of rare manuscripts which he later donated to the Maulana Azad Library at AMU.

== Relationship with Abul Kalam Azad ==
Sherwani shared intellectual ties with public figures of the era, including Allama Shibli Nomani and Maulana Abul Kalam Azad. He is noted in Urdu literature as the sole addressee of Azad's book Ghubar-e-Khatir (The Dust of Memories). The book consists of 24 philosophical letters written by Azad to Sherwani while Azad was imprisoned by the British Raj at Ahmednagar Fort between 1942 and 1946.

== Legacy ==
His biography and scholarly work are documented in historical and academic publications. Historian Shams Tabrez Khan authored his biography in the 1972 book Sadr-e-Yaar Jang. In November 2025, the Department of Arabic at Aligarh Muslim University published Maqālāt-e-Shirwani, a volume compiling scholarly essays about his life and contributions that were originally presented at a national seminar in November 2023.
