= Pettah of Ahmednagar =

Indian fort in 1803

In 1803 the Pettah of Ahmednagar, (Note: Also spelt Pettah of Ahmednuggur in contemporary records (Duke of Wellington 1859)) had forty bastions, or round towers: eight of them were large, with two guns in each; the remainder had only loopholes. There were twelve gates, without any detached works for defence. The walls were of mud, about 10 feet (3.0 m) high without a ditch.

A gunshot to the east of the pettah was the Fort of Ahmednagar. A small river came from the northward, round the west side of the pettah, and passed to the southward of the fort. A nullah also passed from the northward, between the fort and a town called Bhingar, about a gunshot to the eastward, and joined the river.

Two nills or covered aqueducts came from the hills, a mile or more to the north, passed through and supplied the pettah and the town, and then went into the fort, either under or through the ditch, into which the waste water fell.

== Capture during Second Anglo-Maratha War ==
On 8 August 1803, during the Second Anglo-Maratha War, forces under the command of Sir Arthur Wellesley (later the Duke of Wellington) stormed and captured the town.

Wellesley sent forward his stormers against the pettah, having first pointed out to the leaders where they were to fix their ladders. The assault was gallantly led; but within ten minutes five of the officers leading the first attacking party were killed or wounded, the ladders were thrown down and broken; the attack had failed.

Another attacking party had only two ladders; the rush of the stormers broke down one; but, on the other, the stormers, commanded by Captain Vesey and headed by Lieutenant Colin Campbell, forced their way up. About 150 men had scaled the rampart when a cannon-shot smashed the ladder. The fate of the stormers, now cut off, might have seemed hopeless; but they leaped down the inner side of the wall, forced their way through the streets to the central gate, against which another party of stormers were battering on the outside, opened it, let in their comrades, and the town was won. Wellesley then turned his attention to the nearby fort, which after a cannonade surrendered on terms and the garrison marched out with full military honours. (Note: Wellesley saw the attack and was impressed with Colin Campbell he later said: Having made the necessary arrangements beforehand, I let loose the storming party. As I was watching the progress of things, I saw an officer seize a ladder, plant it against the wall, and rush up alone. He was thrown down on reaching the summit, but jumped up at once, and re-ascended; he was again thrown down, and again re-ascended, followed on this occasion by the men. There was a scuffle on the top of the wall, in which the officer had to cut his way through the defenders, and presently a whole crowd of British troops poured after him into the town. As soon as I got in, I made inquiries about him, and found that his name was Colin Campbell, and that he was wounded. I sought him out, and said a few words to him, with which he seemed greatly delighted. I liked his blunt, manly manner, and never lost sight of him afterwards. — Arthur Wellesley.) The successful assault carried out with such apparent ease made a strong impression on the Indians. Golka, a Mahratta chief, wrote to a friend shortly after the incident: (Note: Golka is also spelt Gocklah and Gookiah in other sources.)

The English, are a strange people, and their general an extraordinary man. They arrive here in the morning, examine the walls, carry them, have killed all the garrison in the place, and have now gone back to breakfast. Who can resist such men as these?

— Golka a Mahratta chief. (Note: A different sources state that Colonel Nicolls wrote: "Gookiah, a Mahratta chief, residing in our camp with a body of horse, wrote thus to his friends at Poonan— 'These English are a strange people, and their General a wonderful man. They came here in the morning, looked at the Pettah walls, walked over it, killed all the garrison, and returned to breakfast! What can withstand them?'")
