= Ghubar-e-Khatir =

Collection of letters by Abul Kalam Azad

Ghubar-e-Khatir (Urdu: غُبارِ خاطِر, romanized: ġubār-i xāt̤ir, lit. 'dust of memories') is one of the most important works of Maulana Abul Kalam Azad. It was written primarily between 1942 and 1946 while he was imprisoned in Ahmednagar Fort in Maharashtra by the British Raj. He had traveled to Bombay (now Mumbai) to preside over the meeting of All India Congress Working Committee. The book was later translated into English as Sallies of Mind.

The book is a collection of 24 letters he wrote addressing his close friend, Maulana Habibur Rahman Khan Sherwani. The letters were never sent, as prison regulations did not permit it. After his release in 1946, Azad gave all these letters to his secretary, Muhammad Ajmal Khan, who published them for the first time that year.

== Contents ==
Although the book is a collection of letters, all but one or two letters are unique and most of the letters deal with complex issues such as the existence of God, the origin of religions, the origin of music and its place in religion, and other topics. Abul Kalam means eloquent and the book is particularly appreciated because of its beautiful language. Maulana Abul Kalam Azad's hypnotic description of his morning routine of brewing and drinking tea is notably remarkable in the book.

The book is primarily in Urdu but there are over five hundred couplets, mostly in Persian and Arabic. This is because Azad was born in a family where Arabic and Persian were used more frequently than Urdu. He was born in Mecca, given formal education in Persian and Arabic languages but was never taught Urdu.
