= Solapur Bhuikot Killa =

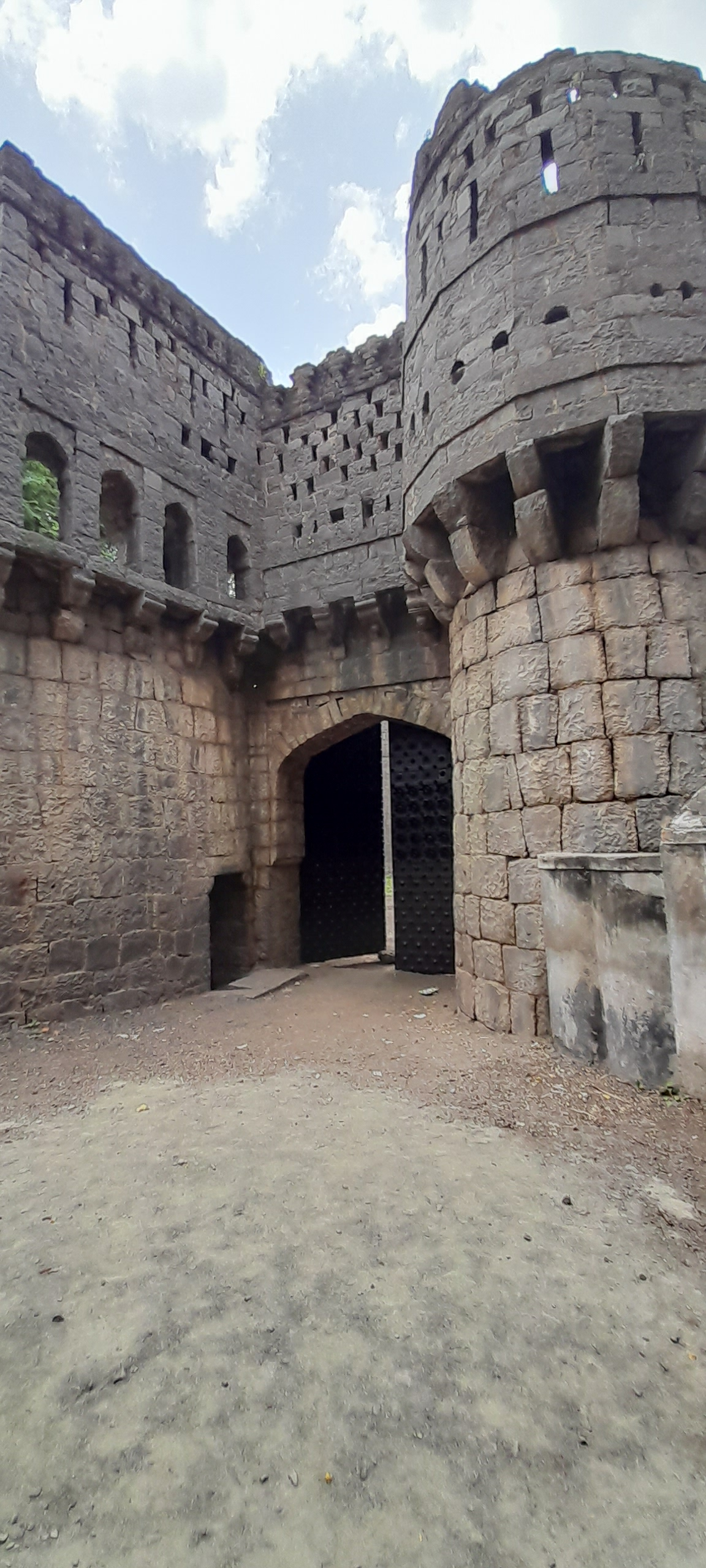
- Main Entrance (Hatti Darwaja)
- Interactive map of Solapur Bhuikot Killa
- Location: Solapur, Maharashtra

History
- Built: 14th century by Bahmani dynasty

The Solapur Bhuikot Killa (Fort) is one of the major tourist locations in Solapur, Maharashtra. The fort is an ancient Hindu fort located in Solapur and one of the ancient historical and religious places in Maharashtra.

== History ==
Bhuikot fort is situated on the banks of Siddheshwar lake in the 12th century. The Bajirao Peshwa, Chhatrapati Pratap Singh Bhosale of Satara, stayed here for a month in 1818. According to the information received, Srikanth had built the fort of Solapur in 1719 for his wisdom. According to some, Mahmud Gawan built another fort around the fort built during the reign of Hindu kings and made the fort impregnable. Muhammad Gawan Bahmani was the Diwan of Sultan Mahmud Shah. The fort of Solapur, which witnessed many historical events, was the refuge of many dynasties. This is the record of 'Fort of Solapur' given as dowry in marriage. This record happened twice. Burhan Nizam Shah ascended the throne of Ahmednagar. (Bhuikot fort information in Marathi) while Bijapur was ruled by Ismail Adilshah. A cordial relationship was established between them. The marital relationship was created to strengthen this relationship. Adilshah's daughter Burhan was given to Nizamshah and the marriage ceremony was celebrated with great pomp. The marriage took place at Solapur fort. At that time, that is. In 1523, the fort was in the possession of Bijapur. Adilshah had announced to give the fort as dowry to Javaya but after marriage Adilshah refused to give the fort. This was followed by a war between Nizamshah and Adilshah. In this battle Jawai Nizam Shah was defeated.In 1552, it was given to Chandbibi Ali Adilshah, the second princess of Ahmednagar. Ali Adilshah's sister Hadiya Sultan was married to Mutarza Nizamshah. However, as accepted, Nizam Shah gave the fort to the Sultan of Bijapur as a dowry.After Bahmani, Adilshahi and Nizamshahi, Solapur fort came under Mughal rule. During Aurangzeb's reign most of his time was spent around the fort. Later this fort came under the control of Nizam of Hyderabad and later the Marathas.

== Architecture ==
The fort has double fortification and has typical Bahmani era construction style. It has two gates, North gate and Mahakali gate, a Shani temple, a ruined Shiva temple with underground Shiva Linga and a Mahakaleshwar temple and a mosque with carved ceiling and several pillars inside it. Siddheshwar temple, Siddheshwar Lake and Hutatma Bagh are also present beside the fort. The fort is constructed on land hence it is called Bhuikot Killa.

There is also a well, which is in octagonal in shape and a small pond inside it. The fort is now in ruins and is maintained by the Archaeological Survey of India (ASI).

== Gallery ==
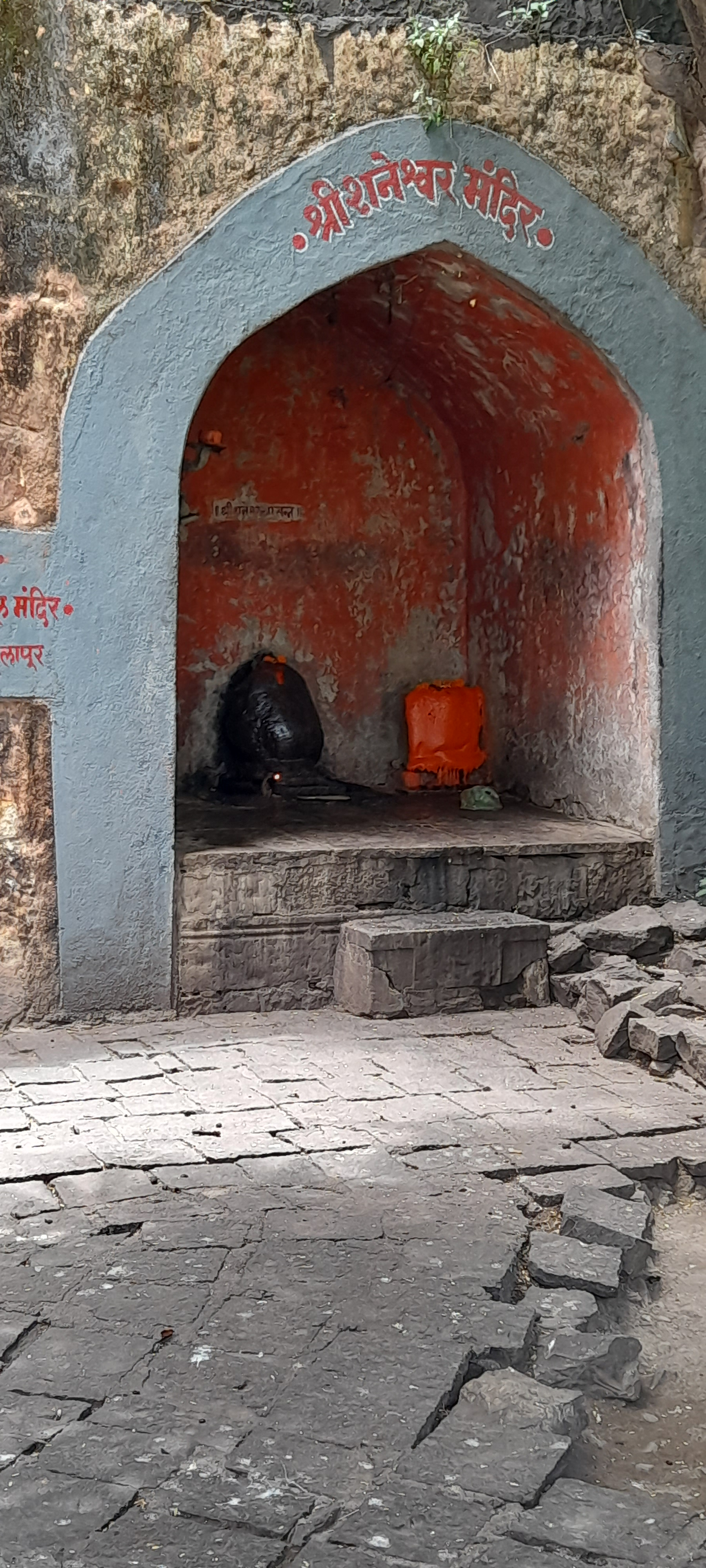
Shani Temple

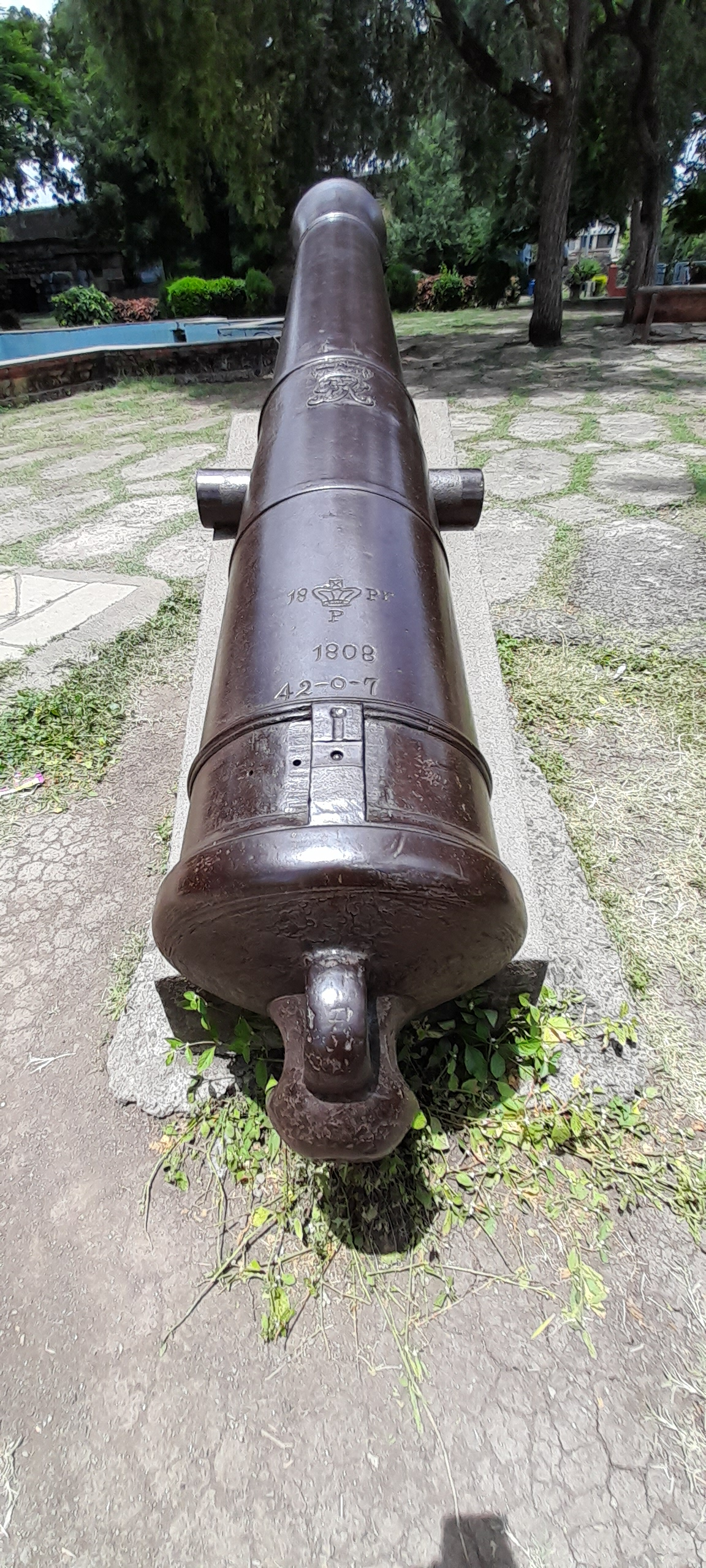
British era 18 inch cannon dating back to 1807/8

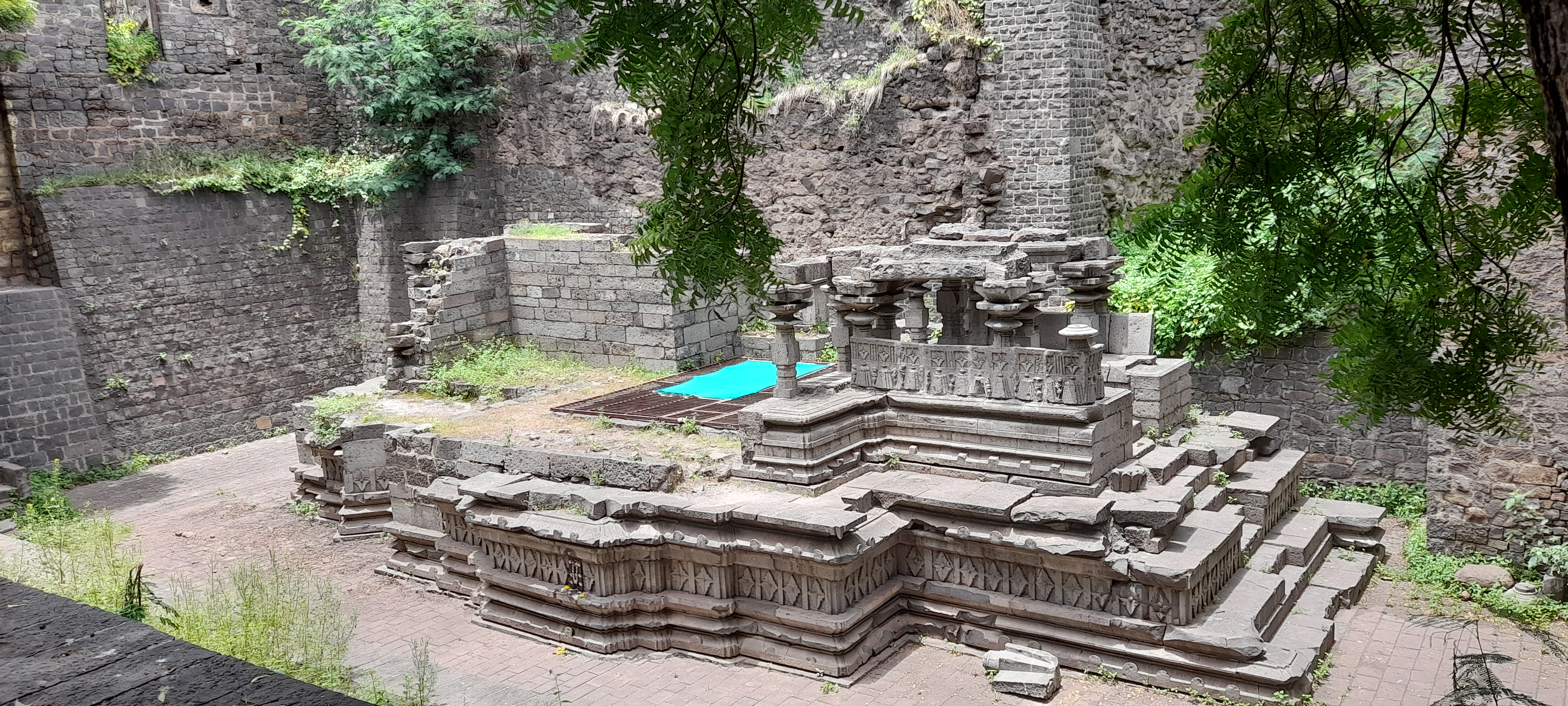
Kapilasiddha Mallikarjun Mandir

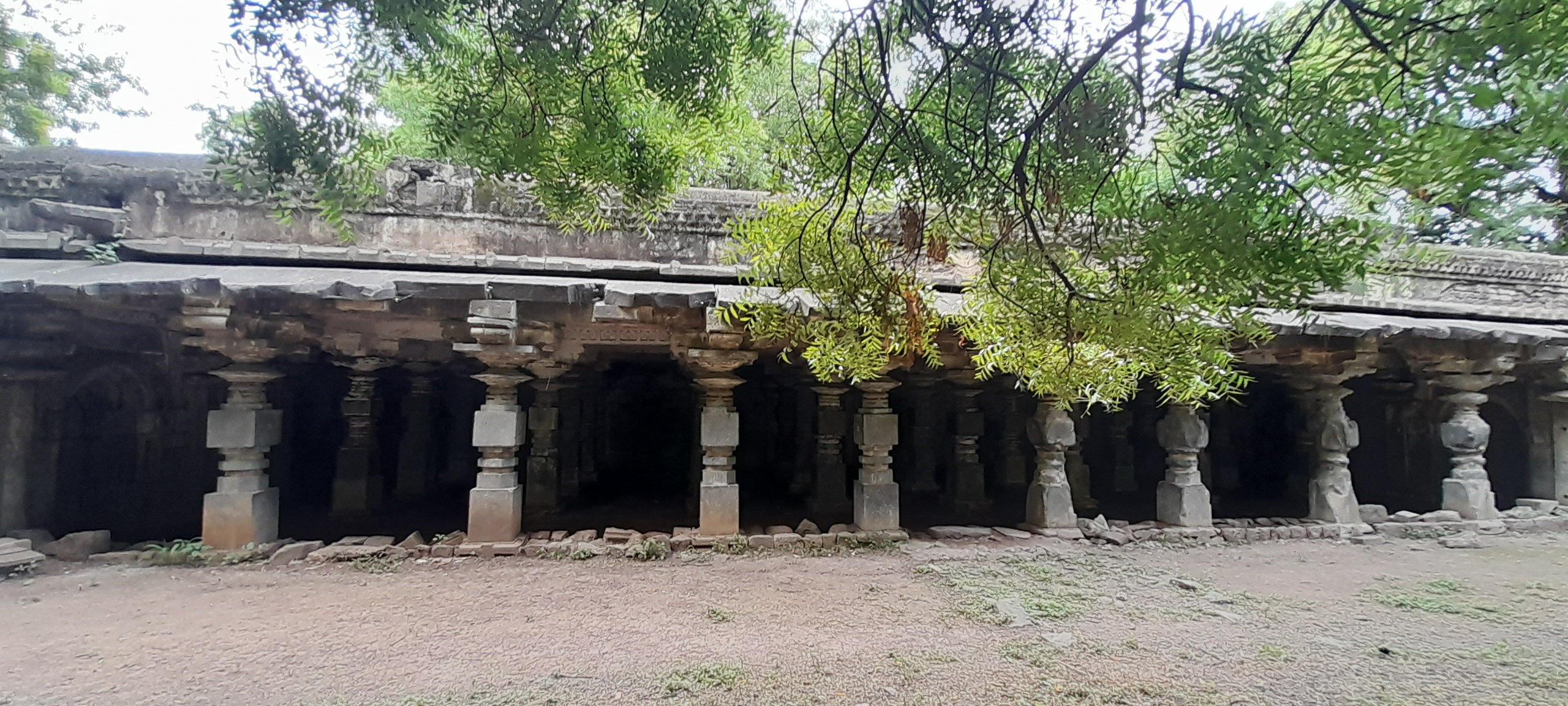
Mosque with 32 pillars

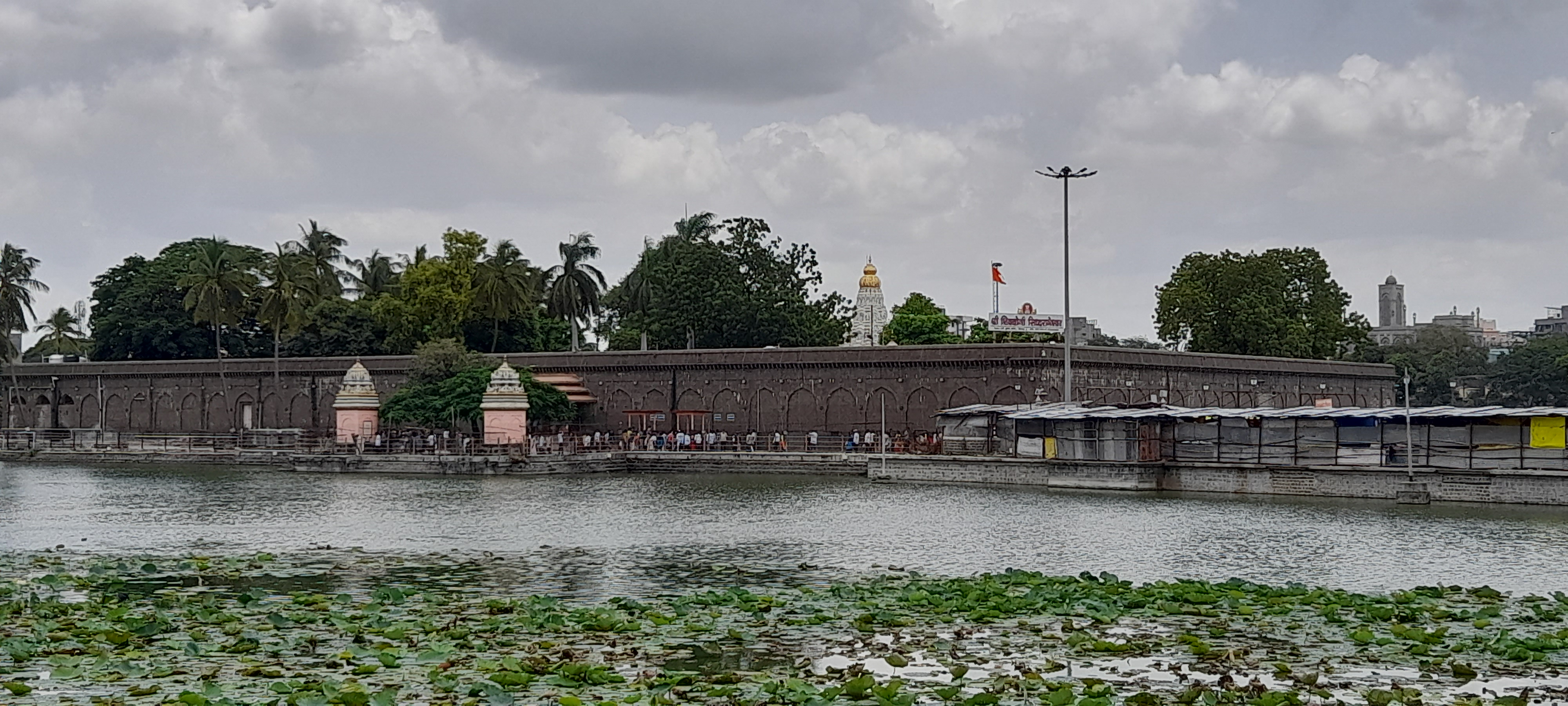
Siddheshwar Temple from the fort

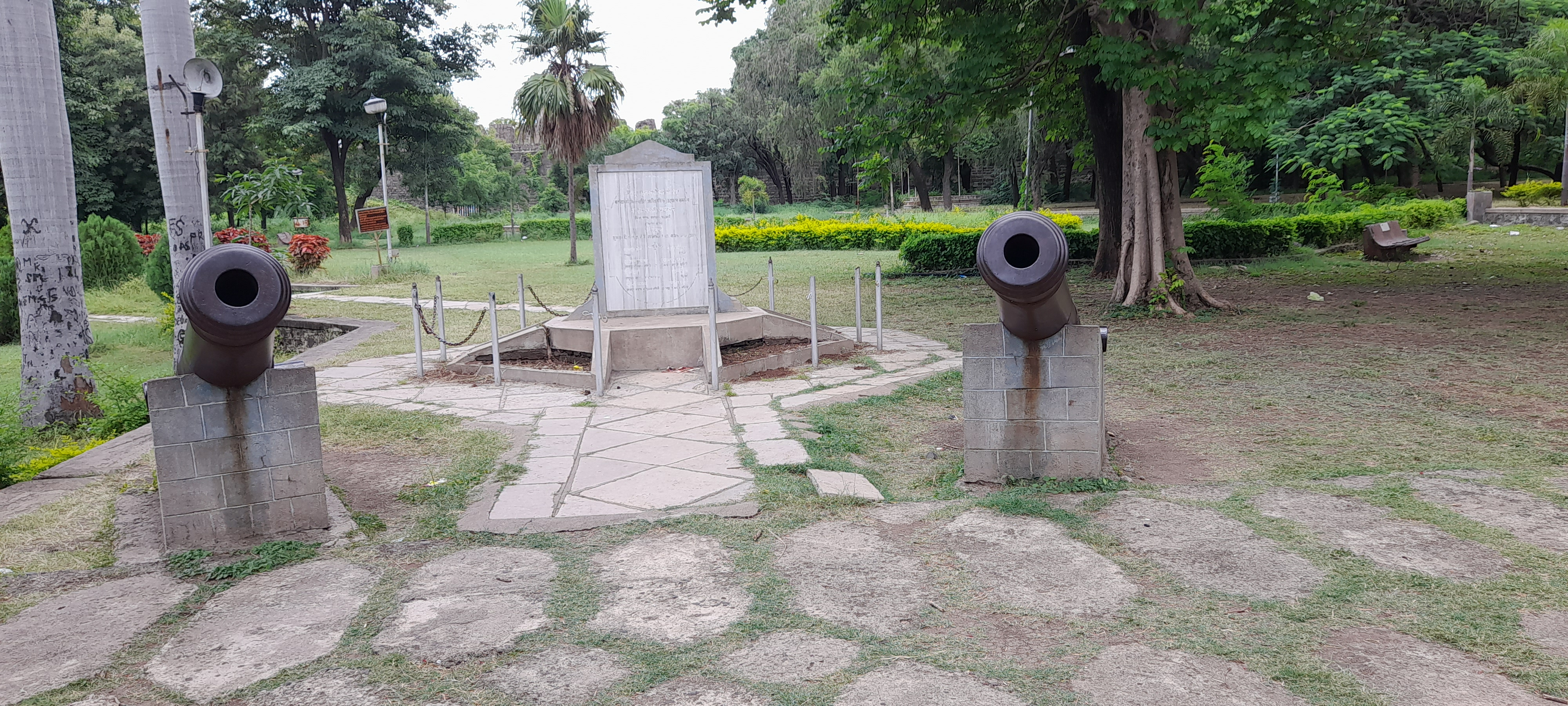
Inner view
