= Jovan Stefanović Vilovski =

Serbian hydrologist (1821–1902)

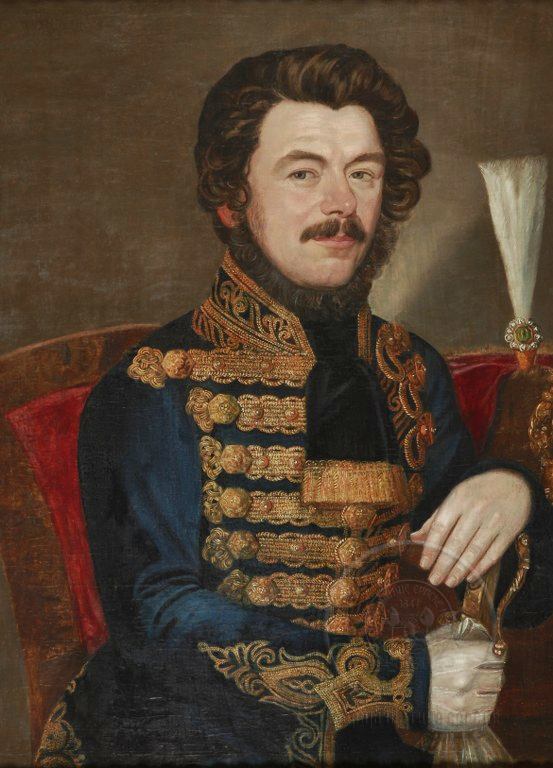

Jovan Stefanović Vilovski (1821-1902) was one of the early Serbian scientist hydrologists who studied the waters in the March, situated along the Pannonian rivers, the Danube, Sava and the Tisa.

He was a general staff major in the Austro-Hungarian army. During the 1848 Revolution, he participated on the side of the Conservative wing around Patriarch Josif Rajačić. He also fought at the Battle of Solferino.

In 1865 he retired and moved from Srem to Vienna where he then began to pursue hydrology. He authored 60 important papers, mainly on the amelioration and regulation of the rivers Tisza and the Danube. He left an extensive memoir in manuscript form.

His work "From the Life of an Officer ..." (Zemun, 1863), written in the Slavoserbian alphabet, served as one of the sources for the Dictionary of Serbo-Croatian Literary and Folk Language in an edition of the Serbian Academy of Sciences and Arts.

== General references ==
- Mala enciklopedija prosveta Мала енциклопедија Просвета [The Little Encyclopedia of Enlightenment]. Vol. 1 (3rd ed.). Belgrade: Prosveta. 1978. OCLC 830201826.
- Petrović, Nikola (1954). Jovan Stefanović Vilovski (in Serbian). Belgrade. OCLC 613066769.
