= Bhingar =

Bhingar Bhrugupur
- Town
- Location in Maharashtra, India
- Coordinates: 19.099025°N 74.773335°E
- Country: India
- State: Maharashtra
- District: Ahilya Nagar

Population (2011)
  - Total: 10,000+

Languages
  - Official: Marathi
- Time zone: UTC+5:30 (IST)

Bhingar, also known as Bhingar Camp, is a census town in Ahmednagar district in the state of Maharashtra, India.

== Demographics ==
As of 2001 India census, Bhingar had a population of 7620. Males constituted 51% of the population and females 49%. Bhingar had an average literacy rate of 73% at that time, higher than the national average of 59.5%; with a male literacy of 79% and a female literacy of 66%. About 13% of the population was under 6 years of age.

== Notable residents ==
- Anna Hazare Right to Information Act (RTI) Activist. He spent the first six years of his life in Lohar Galli, Bhingar.
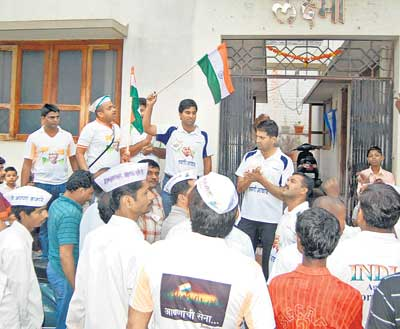
  Anna hazare birthplace
