= Traverse (fortification) =

A traverse, in military fortification, is a mass of earth or other material employed to protect troops against enfilade. It is constructed at right angles to the parapet manned by the defenders, and is continued sufficiently far to the rear to give the protection required by the circumstances, which, moreover, determine its height. A traverse is sometimes utilized as a casemate. Ordinary field works, not less than those of more solid construction, require traverses, though if the trenches, instead of being continuous, are broken into short lengths, they are traversed by the unbroken earth intervening between each length.
