= List of caves in Maharashtra =

The following is a list of caves in the Indian state of Maharashtra.

Name	Location	Era	Image
Ajanta Caves	Ajantha, Aurangabad district		
Aurangabad Caves	Aurangabad		
Bahrot Caves	Dahanu, Thane district		
Bedse Caves	Maval, Pune district		
Bhaja Caves	Maval, Pune district		
Bhatala Caves	Chandrapur, Vidarbha Maharashtra	5th Century CE	
Bhokardan Caves	Bhokardan, Jalna district		Bhokardan-tukai-caves-7693511
Dhak Bahiri	Jambhivli, Pune district		
Elephanta Caves	Elephanta Island, Mumbai		
Ellora Caves	Aurangabad district		
Gandharpale Caves	Raigad		
Ghatotkacha Cave	Janjala Village, Sillod, Aurangabad District		
Ghorawadi Caves			
Kanheri Caves	Borivali, Mumbai		
Karad Caves	Satara District		
Karla Caves	Pune		
Kharosa			
Kondana Caves			
Kuda Caves			
Lenyadri Caves			
Mahakali Caves			
Mandapeshwar Caves	Borivali, Mumbai		
Nadsur Caves			
Nenavali Caves			
Pandavleni	Nashik, Maharashtra		
Panhalakaji Caves			
Pataleshwar Caves	Pune City		
Pitalkhora	Kannad, Aurangabad		
Shelarwadi Caves			
Shivleni Caves	Ambajogai		
Shirwal Caves			
Shivneri Caves			
Thanale Caves			
Tulja Caves			
Vijasan Caves			
Wai Caves			
Kondivade Caves	Kondivade, Raigad district		
Lonad Caves	Lonad, Thane district		
Pale Jain cave	Pale village, Pune district		
