= Buddha cave =

Buddha cave may refer to many caves in Asia which are noted for their Buddha statues:

== Afghanistan ==
- Bamiyan Buddhas and caves.

== China ==
- Beishan Rock Carvings, Dazu, Chongqing
- Dazu Rock Carvings, Dazu, Chongqing
- Bingling Temple, Gansu
- Mogao Caves, Dunhuang, Gansu
- Mati Temple, Sunan, Gansu
- Maijishan Grottoes, Tianshui, Gansu
- Shuilian Grottoes, Tianshui, Gansu
- Tiantishan Grottoes, Wuwei, Gansu
- Yulin Caves, Guazhou, Gansu
- Western Thousand Buddha Caves, Gansu
- Longmen Grottoes, Henan
- Beishan Temple, Xining, Qinghai
- Anyue Stone Carvings, Anyue, Sichuan
- Oriental Buddha Park, Leshan, Sichuan
- Tuoshan, Qingzhou, Shandong
- Yungang Grottoes, Shanxi
- A-ai Buddha Cave, Xinjiang
- Bezeklik Thousand Buddha Caves, Xinjiang
- Kumtura Thousand Buddha Caves, Xinjiang
- Kizil Caves, Xinjiang
- Shibaoshan, Yunnan

== India ==
- Saspol Caves, Kashmir
- Ajanta Caves, Maharashtra
- Bhaja Caves, Maharashtra
- Ellora Caves, Maharashtra
- Karla Caves, Maharashtra
- Pandavleni Trishran Caves, Maharashtra
- Gandharpale Caves, Maharashtra
- Bedse Caves, Maharashtra
- Dharashiv Caves, Maharashtra
- Elephanta Caves, Maharashtra
- Ghorawadi Caves, Maharashtra
- Jogeshwari Caves, Maharashtra
- Kanheri Caves, Maharashtra
- Karad Caves, Maharashtra
- Kondana Caves, Maharashtra
- Kuda Caves, Maharashtra
- Lenyadri, Maharashtra
- Mahakali Caves, Maharashtra
- Mandapeshwar Caves, Maharashtra
- Nadsur Caves, Maharashtra
- Nenavali Caves, Maharashtra
- Panhalakaji Caves, Maharashtra
- Pitalkhora, Maharashtra
- Shelarwadi Caves, Maharashtra
- Shirwal Caves, Maharashtra
- Shivneri Caves, Maharashtra
- Thanale Caves, Maharashtra
- Tulja Caves, Maharashtra
- Wai Caves, Maharashtra

== Laos ==
- Tham Pha, Khammouane Province
- Pak Ou Caves, Luang Prabang

== Myanmar ==
- Pindaya Caves, Shan State

== Nepal ==
- Sky Caves of Mustang

== Sri Lanka ==
- Dambulla cave temple

== Thailand ==
- Wat Tham, Phang Nga
- Tham Khao Luang Cave, Phetchaburi
- Wat Suwannakuha, Takua Thung
- Wat Tham Chiang Dao, Chiang Dao
- Wat Tham Pla, Maesai
- Tham Tu Pu, Chiang Rai

== Tibet ==
- Donggar Piyang Grottoes, Ngari
