= M. N. Deshpande =

Indian archaeologist (1920-2008)

Madhusudan Narhar Deshpande (11 November 1920 – 7 August 2008), was an Indian archaeologist, art historian and conservator who served as the Director General of the Archaeological Survey of India from 1972 to 1978.

== Early life ==
Deshpande was born into a Deshastha Brahmin family in the village of Rahimatpur in the Satara district of the then Bombay Presidency. He did his schooling in Poona and graduated with honours from Fergusson College in 1942. Deshpande did his post graduate research at the Deccan College under H. D. Sankalia on "The Cultural History of India based on Jain Canonical Literature and Archaeology" but before completion, he was selected by Mortimer Wheeler to undergo training in field archaeology in the School of Archaeology at Taxila.

He excavated mostly Buddhist caves in Western and Northern India, namely Ajanta, Ellora, Tabo, Nadsur, Pitalkhora, and Panhalakaji. He also reported on the Buddhist sites of Bahal and Tekwade in what is today Jalgaon district. During the 1958-59 season, he conducted excavations at Daimabad, which revealed a Chalcolithic Era settlement.

Deshpande became an Assistant Superintendent at the ASI in 1946 and went on to retire as the Director General in 1978.

== Books & articles ==
- The caves of Panhāle-Kājī (ancient Pranālaka): an art historical study of transition from Hinayana, Tantric Vajrayana to Nath Sampradāya (third to fourteenth century A.D.). New Delhi: Archaeological Survey of India. 1986. ASIN B0006EPMPS. OCLC 923371295.
- MN Deshpande's Papers, hosted by the Ashoka University.
- "MY TRYST WITH CHINESE ART M. N. Deshpande | IGNCA". ignca.gov.in. Retrieved 2023-12-09.

| Preceded by B. B. Lal | Director General of the Archaeological Survey of India; 1972 - 1978 | Succeeded by B. K. Thapar |
