= Dhak Bahiri =

Indian cave in Sahyadri hill range

Coordinates: 18°52′29.6″N 73°25′42″E

Dhak Bahiri is a cave in the Sahyadri hill range, situated near the village Jambhivli off village-Malavali in the Pune district of India. It was used by pilgrims and sages for the pilgrimage to the god Bahiri.

== Location ==
The nearest col to the cave sits at the end of a 1-hour hike along a trail leading out of Jambhivli. From there, the terrain rises into the Dhak and Kalakrai peak. Reaching the cave requires ascending the col and walking along the scarp, followed by a 30' vertical ascent.

== Inside the cave ==
Water from the rock face drains into a cistern in the cave. There is room inside for 15 - 20 people to camp overnight. The local village maintains a supply of utensils and cookware on hand for use by campers.

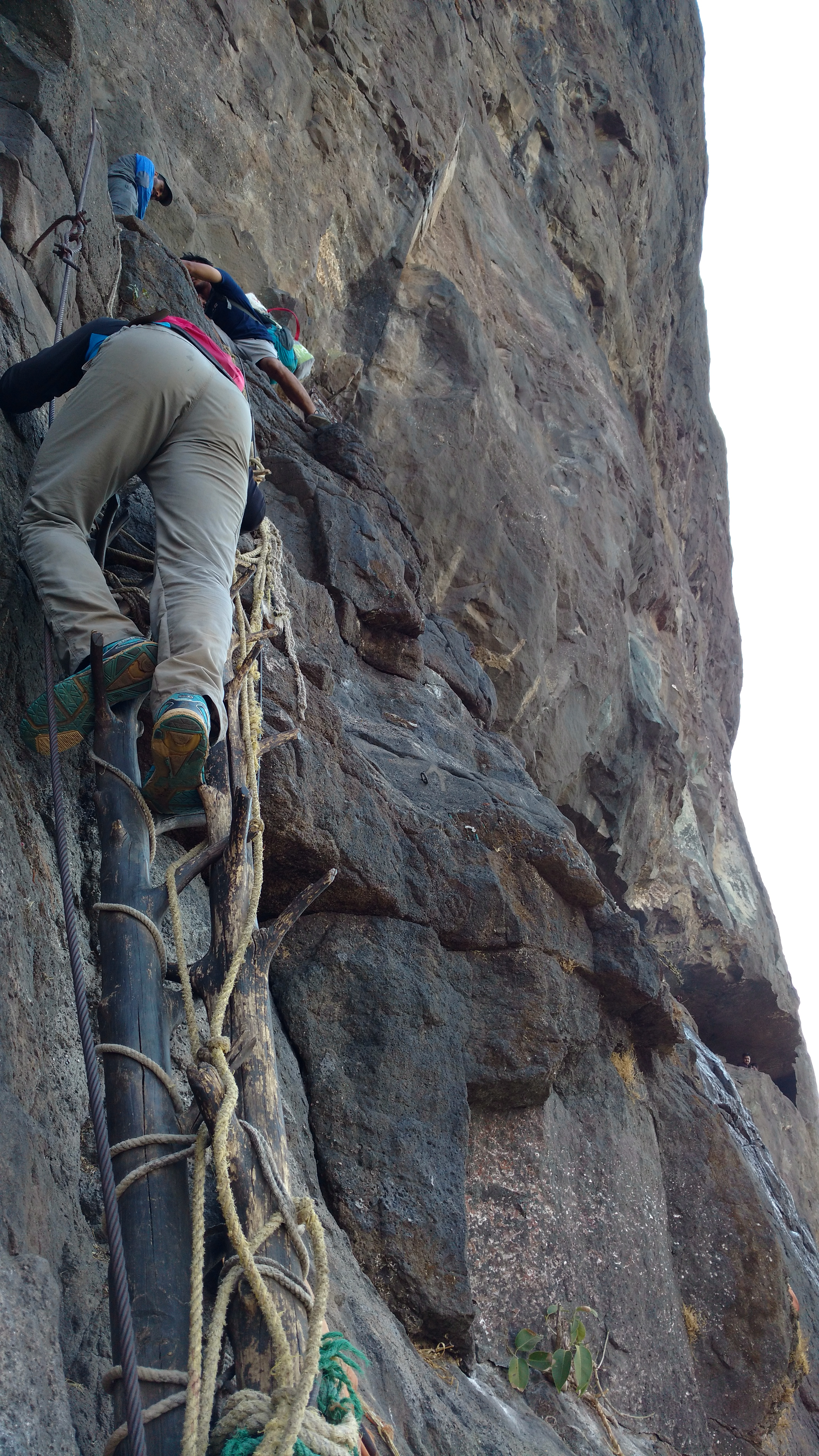
The final climb

== Gallery ==
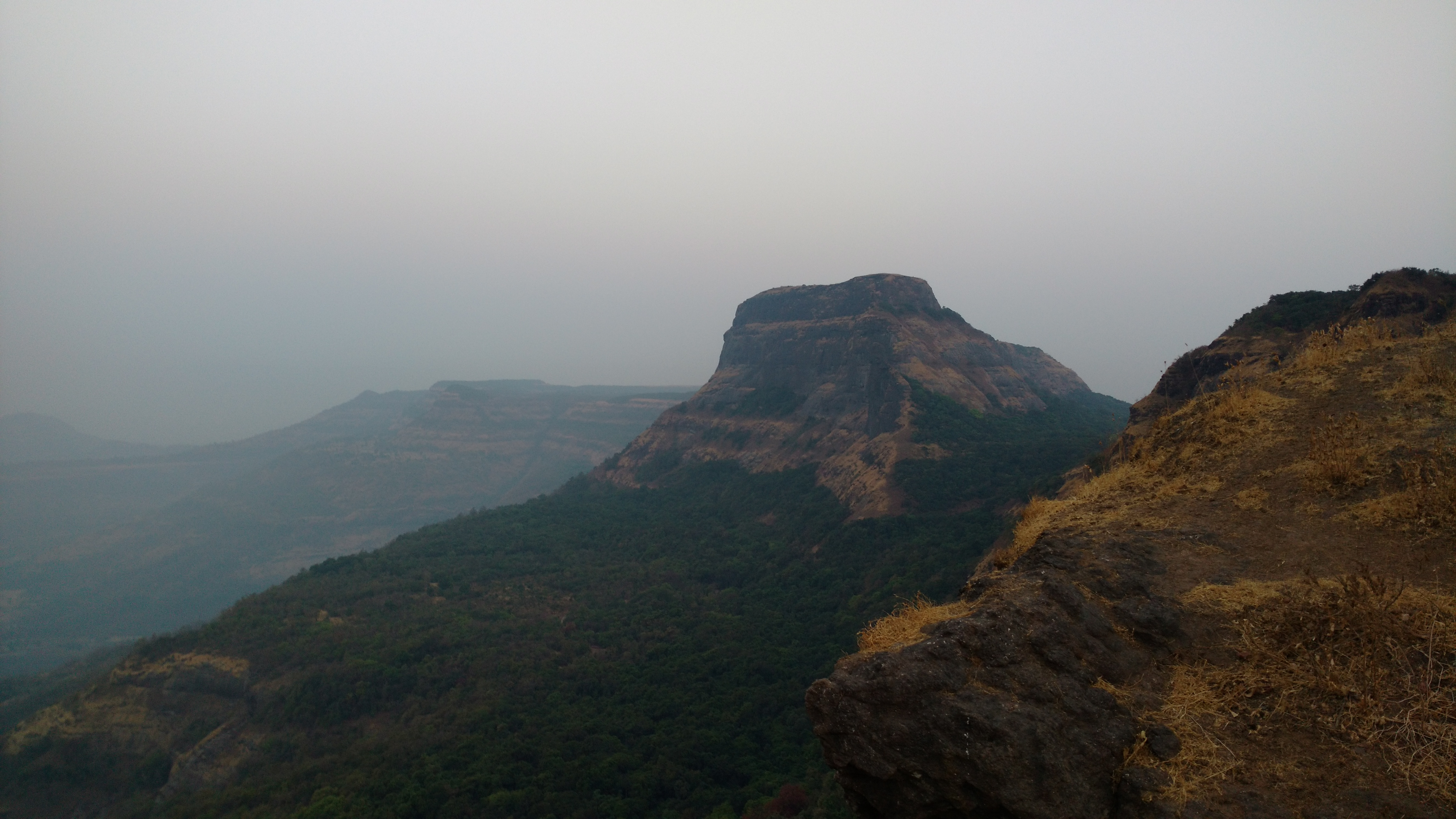
Dhak fort

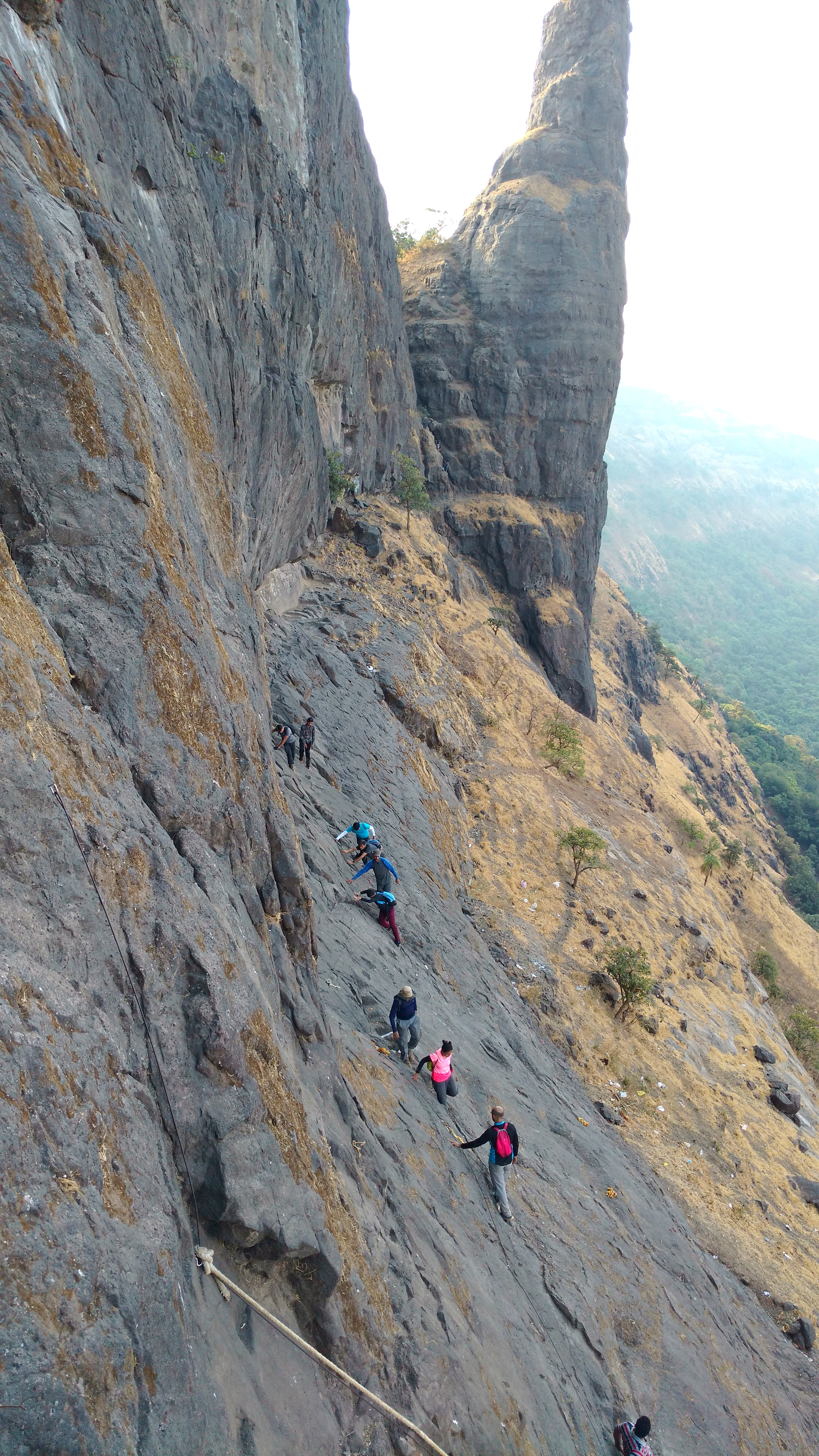
The cole between Dhak and kalakrai pinnacle

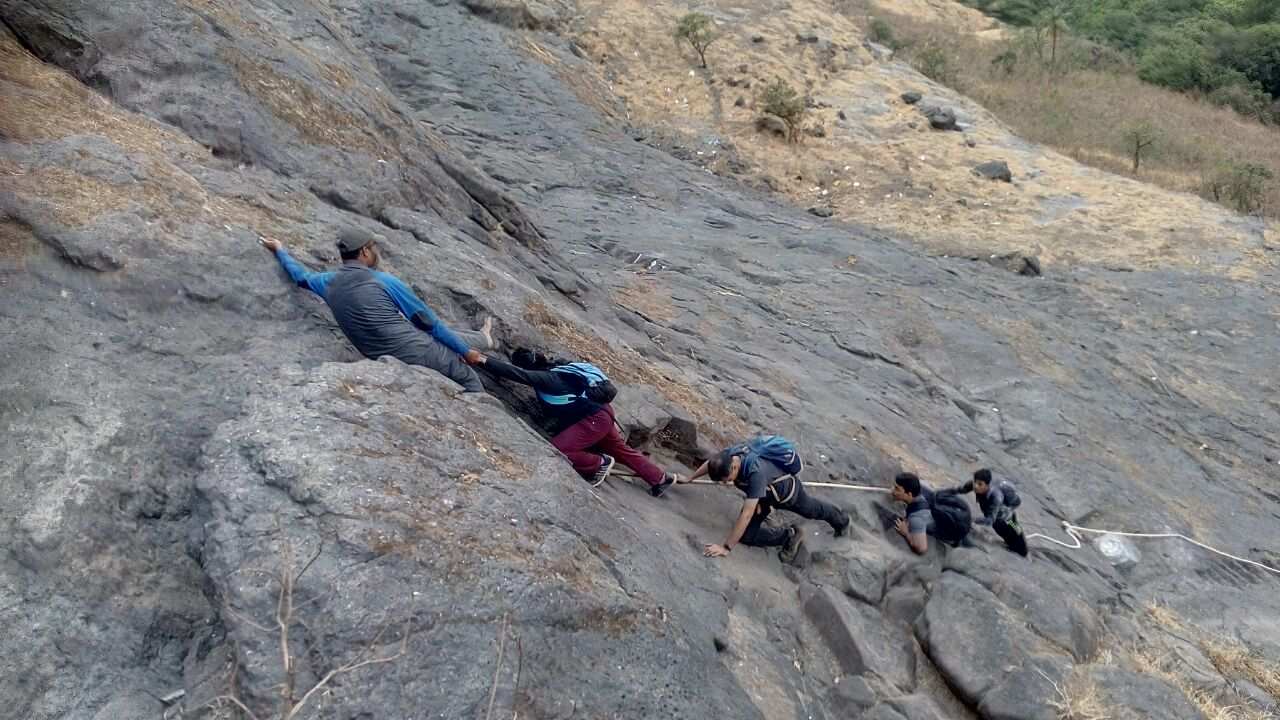
The vertical climb

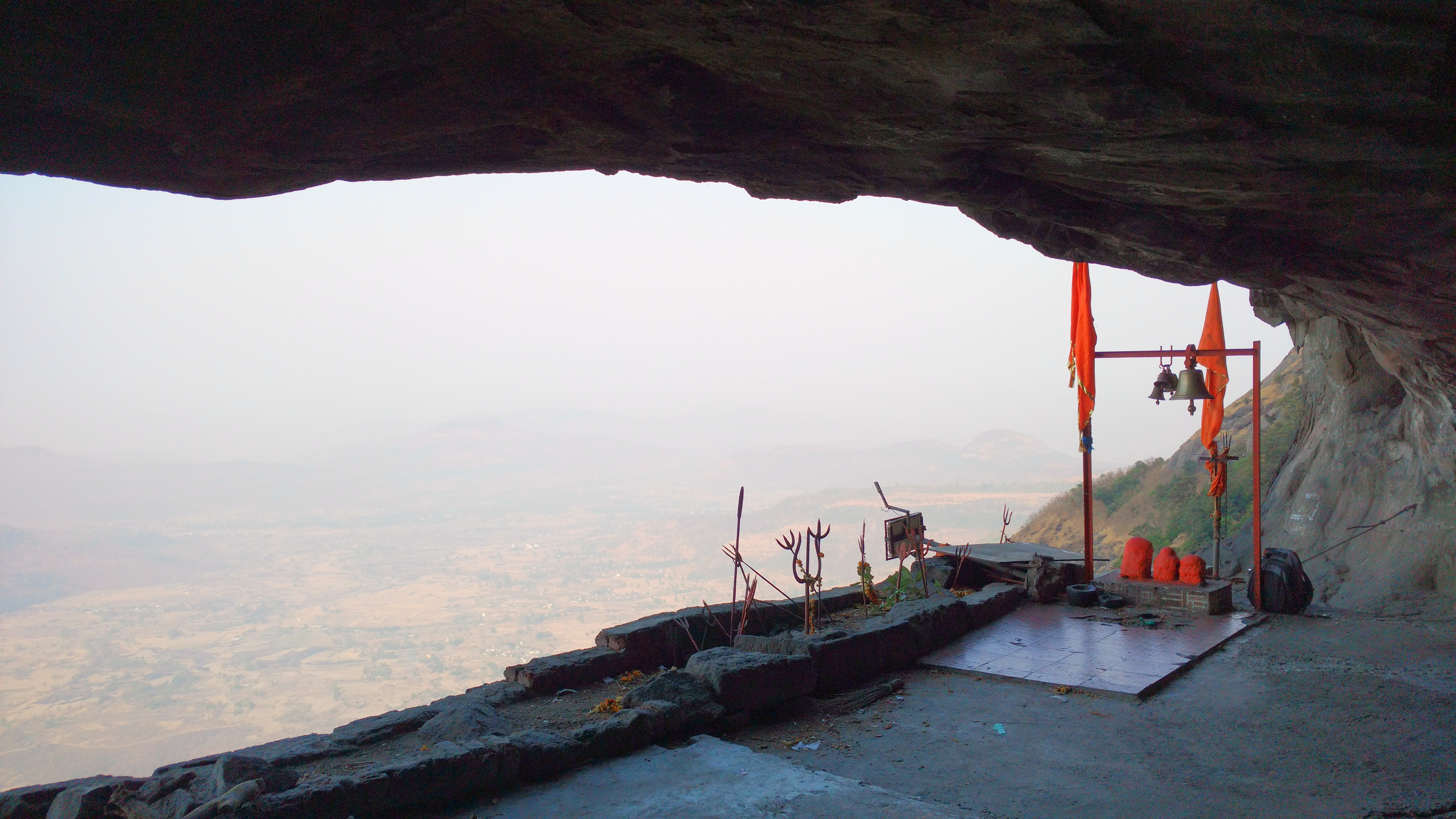
The Bahiri cave

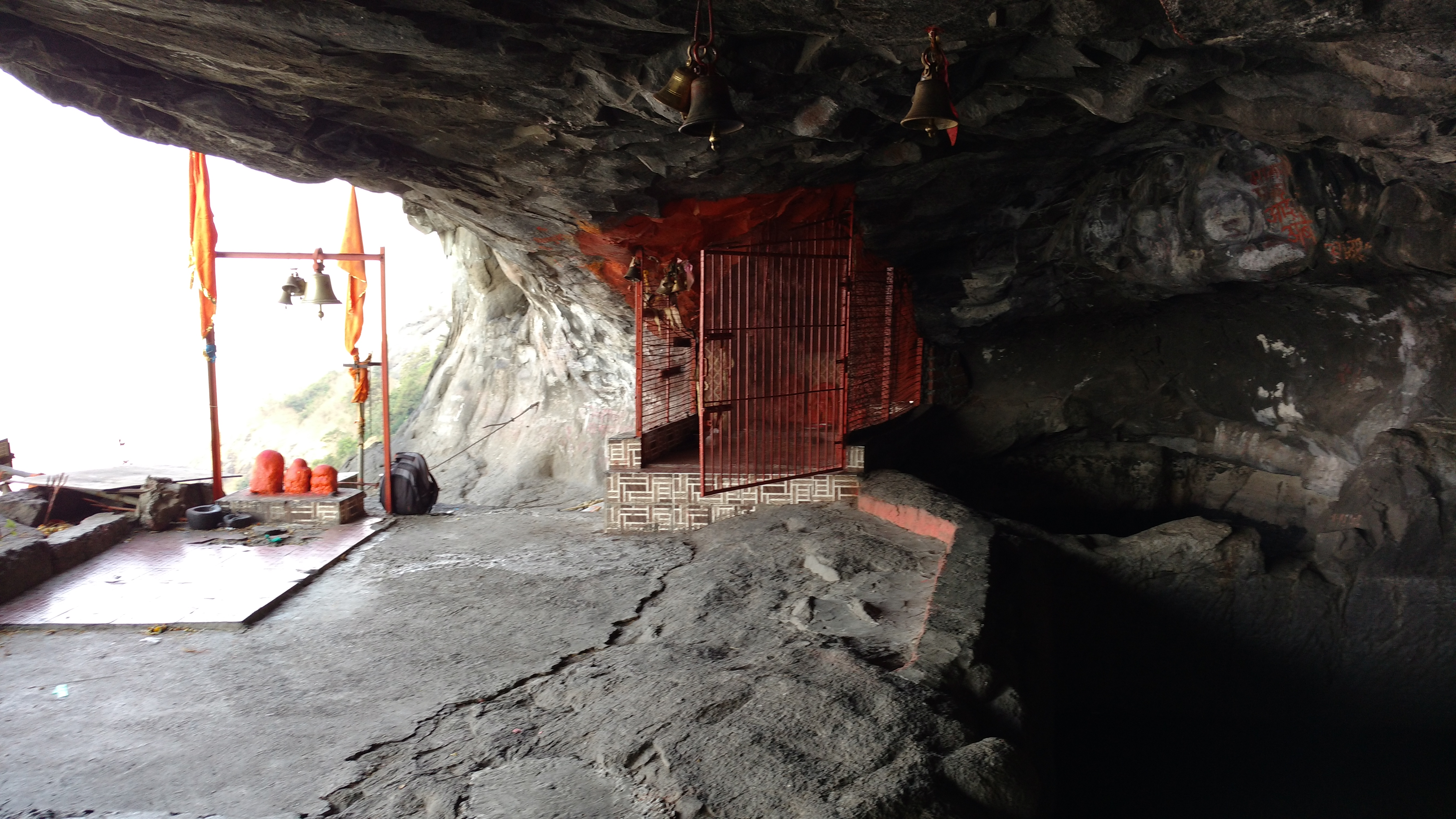
Water cistern in the cave

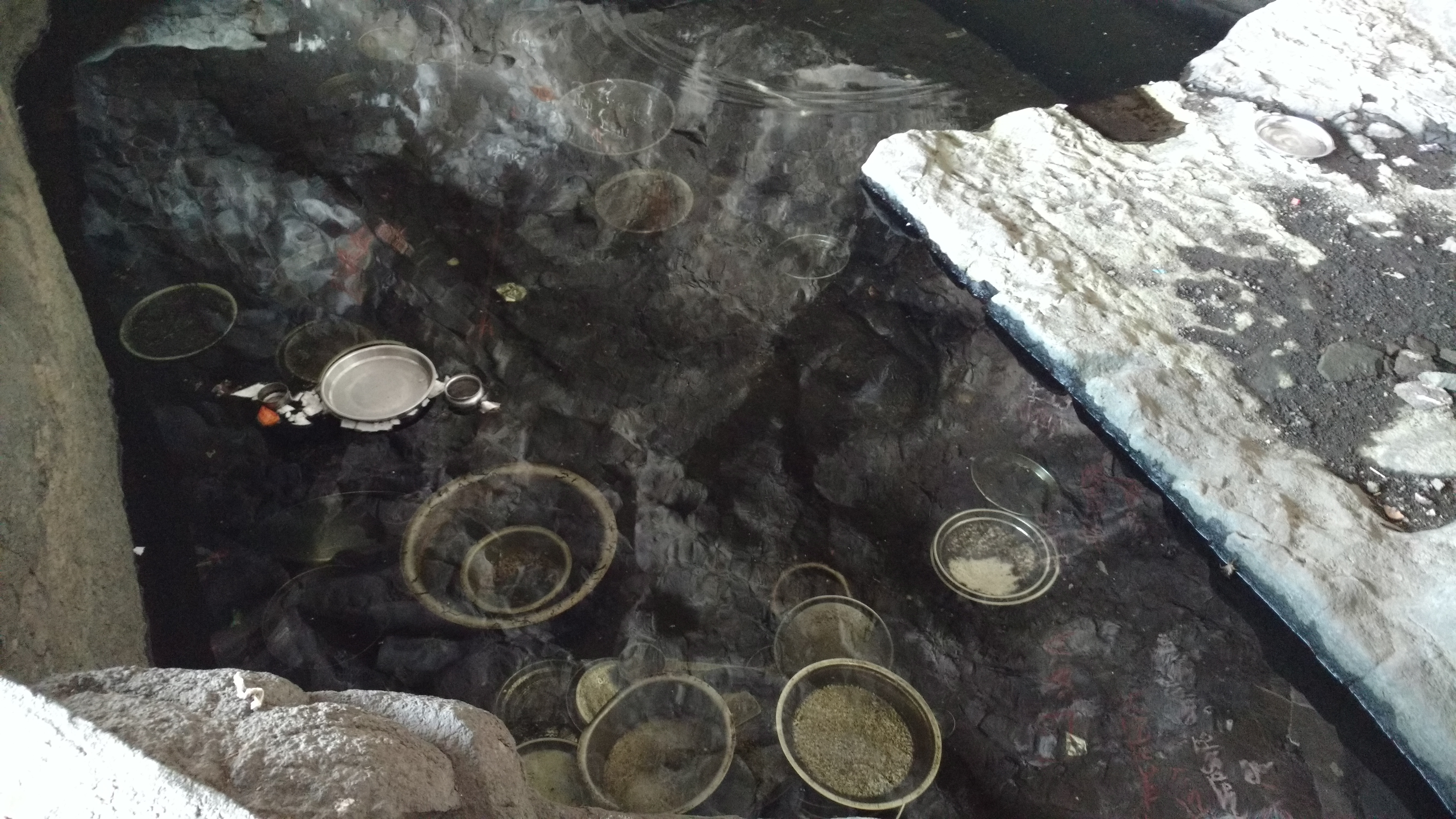
The utensils dipped in water

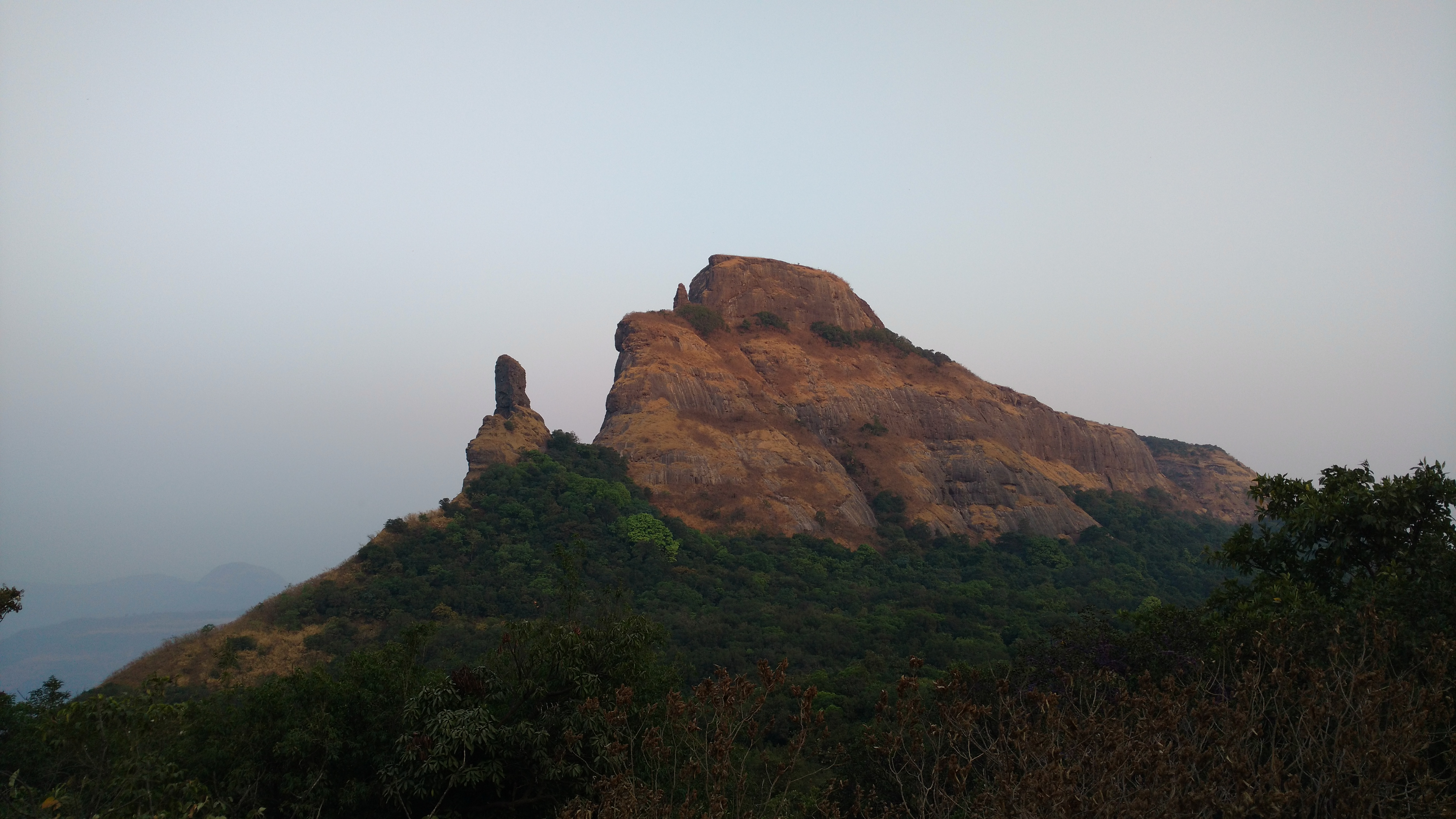
Dhak fort and the pinnacle
