= Wai Caves =

Buddhist caves in Lonara, India

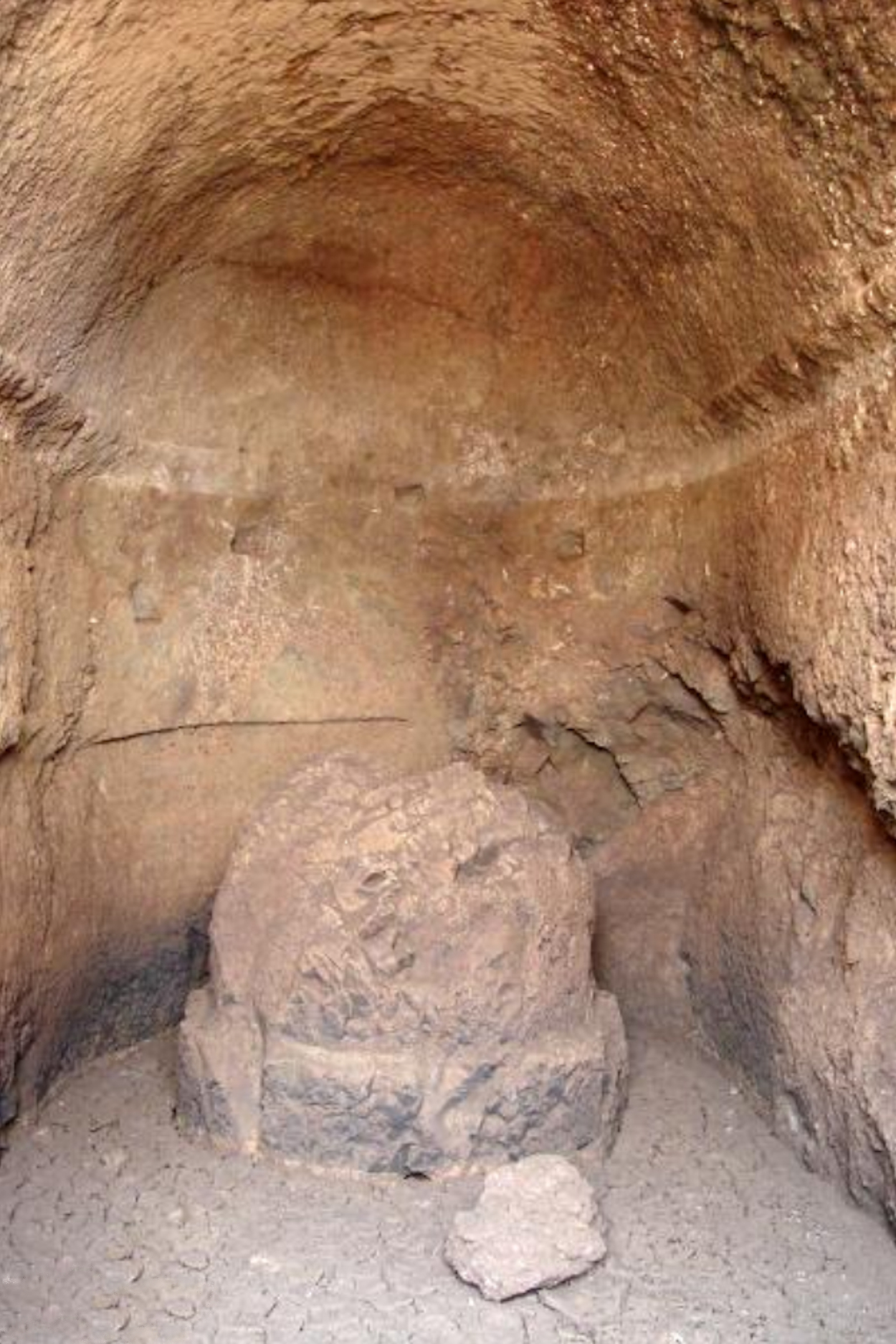
- Wai caves, Pandavgad Leni Dhavadi.jpg

- Location within India Location within Maharashtra
- 17.997386°N 73.8624306°E
- Type: Buddhist caves

Wai Caves are 9 Buddhist Caves, situated at Lonara, 7 km north of Wai. The Chaitya hall containing a Stupa has since been converted into a Shiva temple.

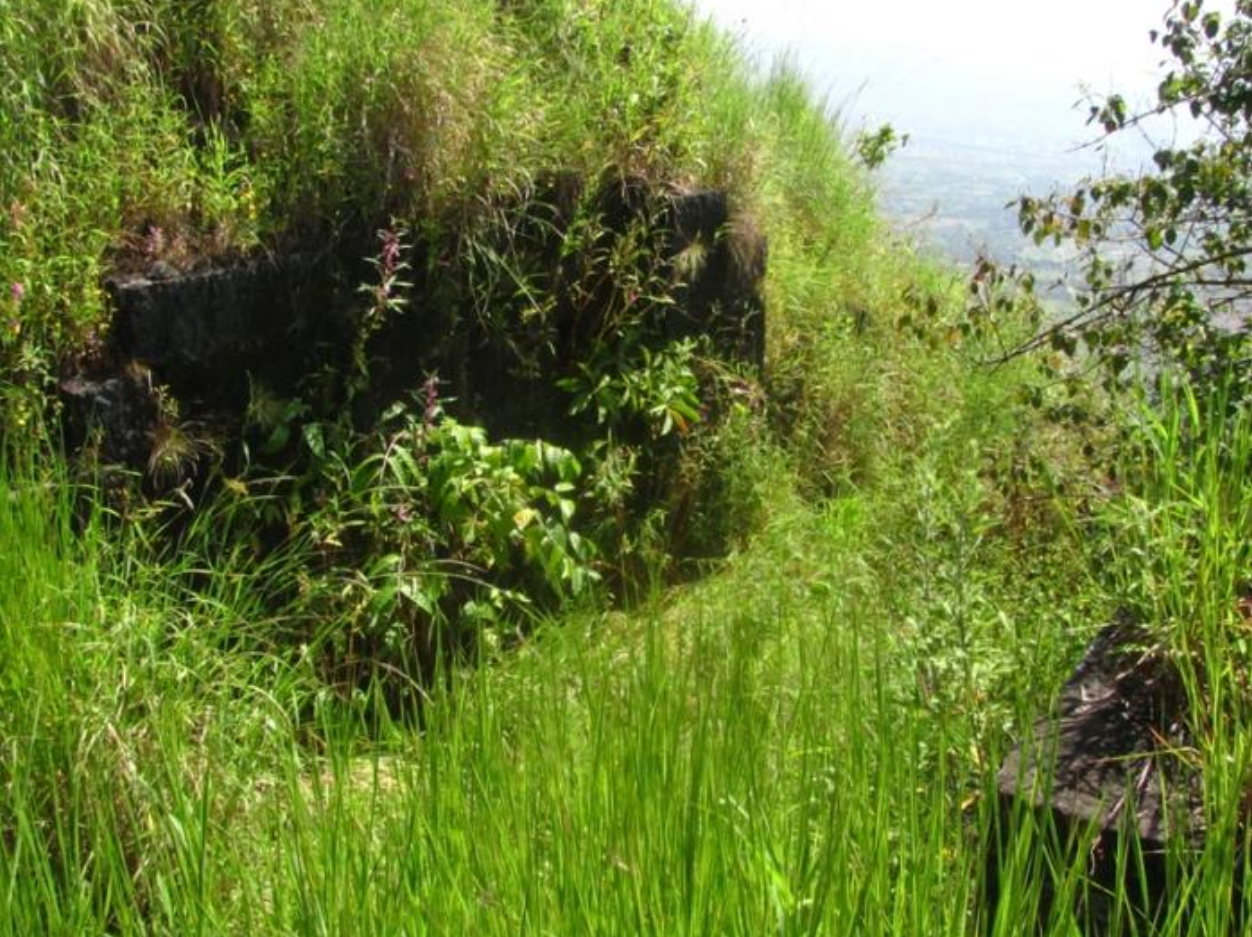
Wai caves, Pandavgad Leni entrance.

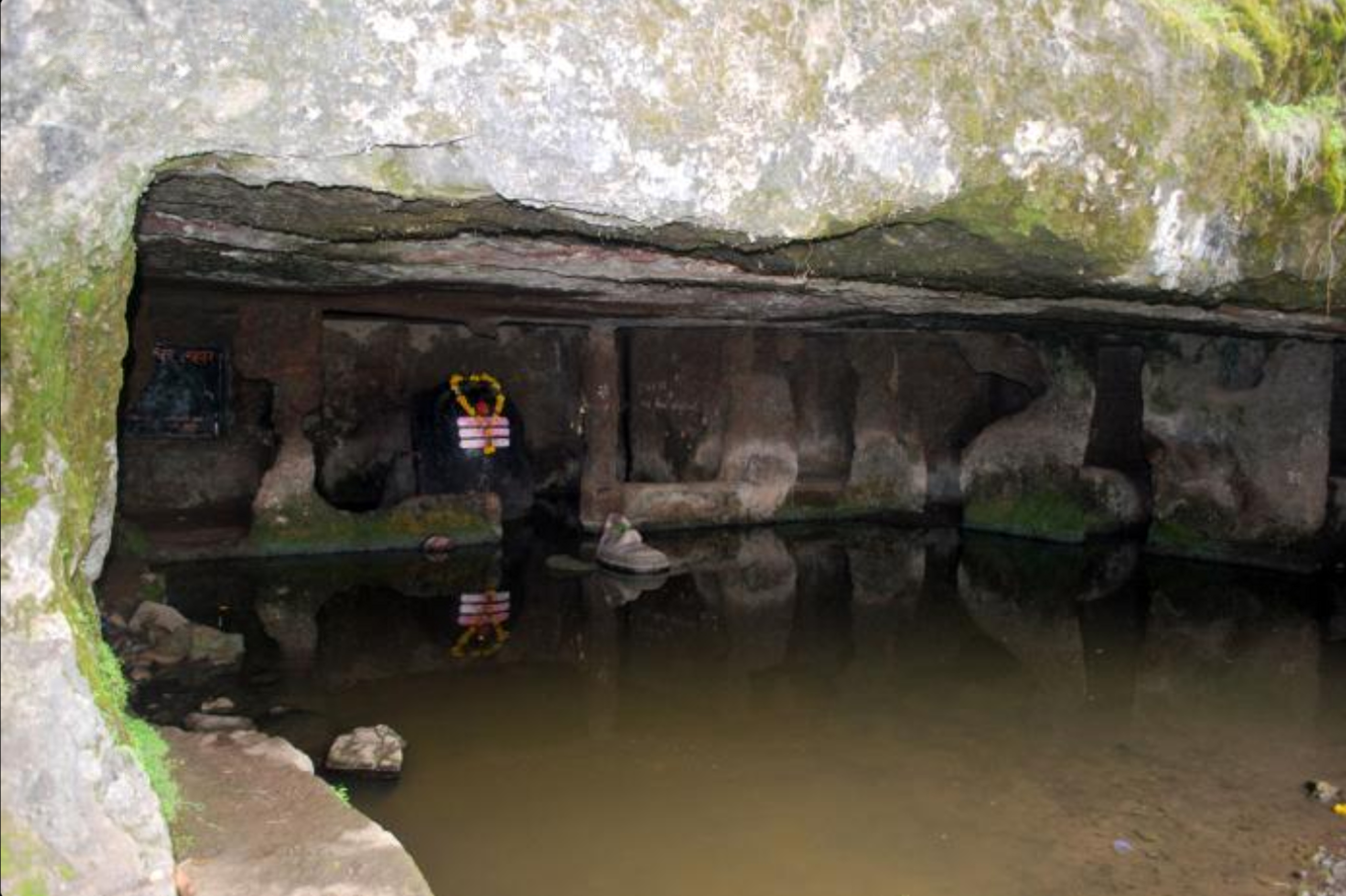
Wai caves, Lohare Leni (17.993732°N 73.916158°E).
