= Ghorawadi Caves =

Ancient buddhist cave in Maharashtra, India

Ghorawadi Caves Ghoradeshwar caves Shelarwadi caves
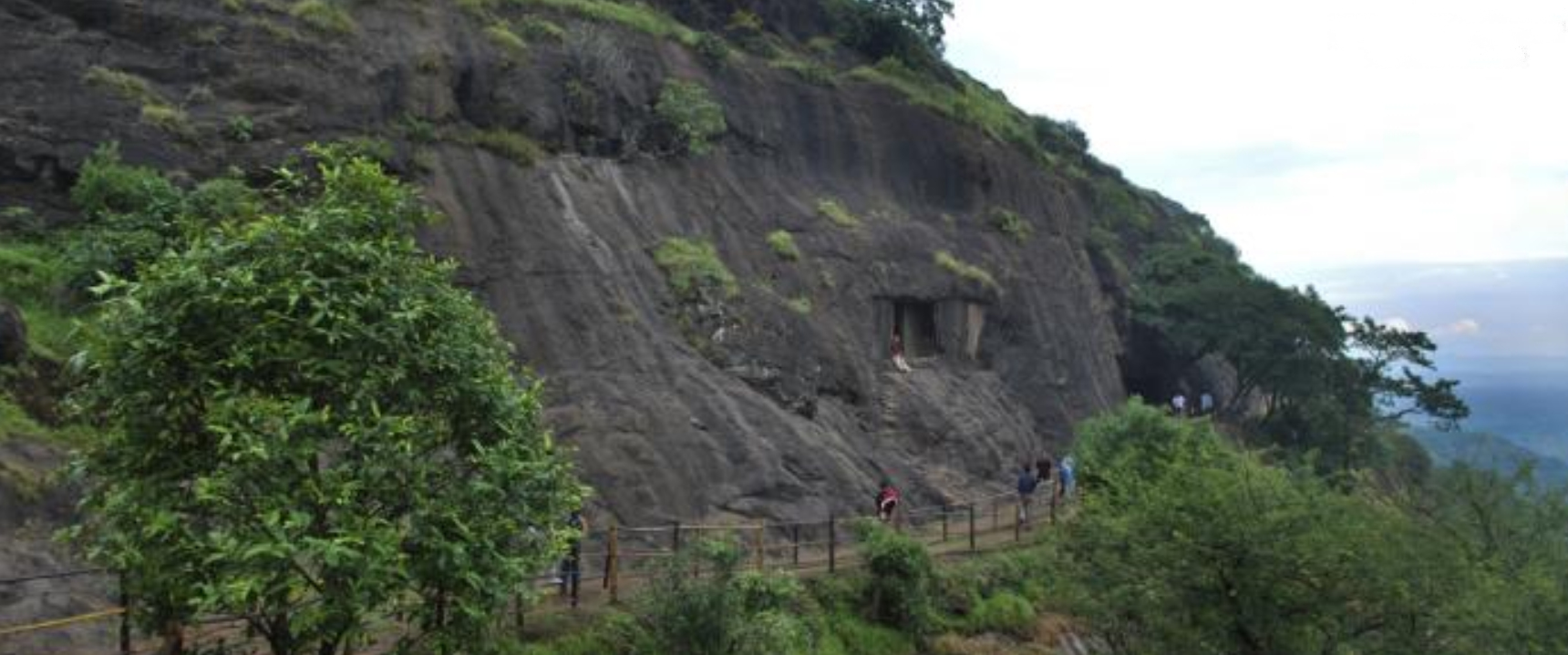
- The caves

- Location within India Location within Maharashtra
- Coordinates: 18.692251°N 73.704056°E

The Ghorawadi caves, also known as Ghoradeshwar caves or Shelarwadi caves, are around 25 km (16 mi) northwest of Pune, India, were originally Buddhist caves, and now contain carvings and statues of Buddhist and Hindu deities.

They are close to the NH4 highway connecting Pune and Mumbai. The caves were carved out of a single rock formation around the 3rd and 4th century CE.

There are nine rooms for meditation adjoining the chaityagriha. An inscription in Brāhmī script on one of the walls says that the Chaityagriha is dedicated with affection to the Buddha and the Samgha by the daughters of "Dhapar", who was a disciple of "Bhadantsingh". The chaityagriha is now known as Shri Ghorwadeshwar Temple.

The caves are situated at the top of a hill. Several caves contain representations of deities including Vitthal, Rakhumai and Saint Tukaram. It is said that Saint Tukaram used to meditate at Ghorawadi caves and also at places like Durga Tekdi near Nigdi, Bhandara and Bhamchandra near Dehu.

A large cave contains a representation of Shivlinga that is visited during Mahashivratri by people seeking the blessings of Shiva.

== Buddhist Legend ==
The caves were earlier known as Chaityagriha or Chaittagriha (in Pali) caves which carried various inscriptions on it by Buddhist scholars stating these caves were built as a sign of affection to Buddha and the Sangha of Buddhist scholar Dhapar.It still contains various ancient Buddhist relics. Some evidences prove the existence of Buddhist Vihara here.

== Hindu legend ==
The Cave structure and the Shiva Linga are of the same stone, thus proving that the temple is as old as the cave. Later, Buddhism dominated the Deccan Plateau region during medieval age, after which Hinduism dominated again. As per Hindu legends, due to unavoidable situations and disasters including famines, the natural beauty in this region started dying. Rivers died, forests started to burn due to heat and as its effect, the biodiversity here stated to vanish. Unique birds like the Great Indian Bustard of this region started to vanish. In order to prevent this, the people of the villages started to worship Shiva by establishing a shivalinga inside these caves. Even though after severe efforts, there was no relief from famines. After all this, in order to protect its clan, a bustard bird started worshipping the Shivalinga. By seeing devotion of an innocent bird to relieve from the disastrous nature, Shiva appeared before the bird and granted him the boon. Today, the Lord here is worshipped as Ghoradeshwar, which is made of two words, Ghorad and Ishwar. The word Ghorad stands for The Indian Busters in Marathi and Ishwar stands for Lord. The word Ghoradeshwar means Lord of the Bustard.

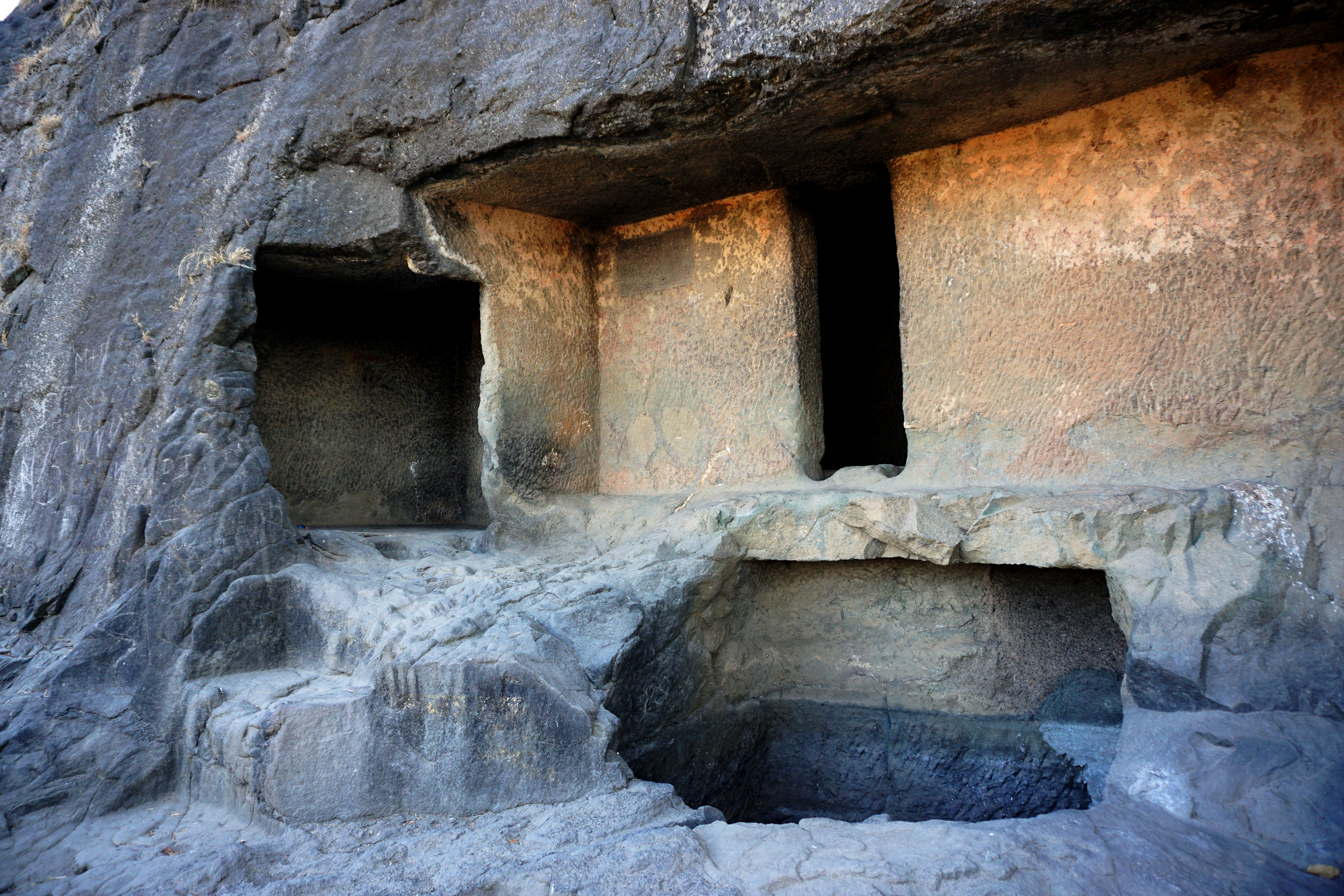
Unoccupied Vihara and cistern.

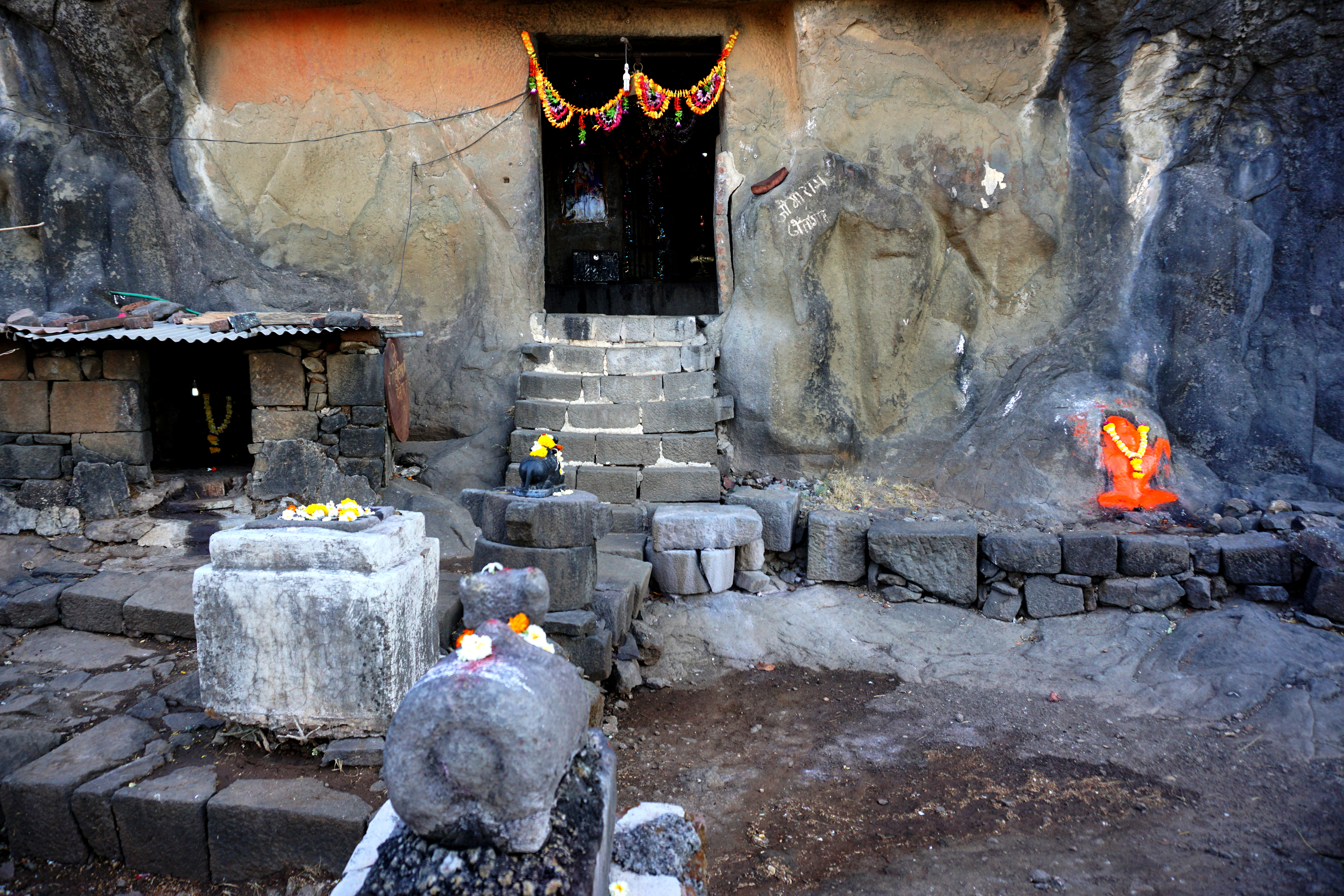
Vihara, now occupied.

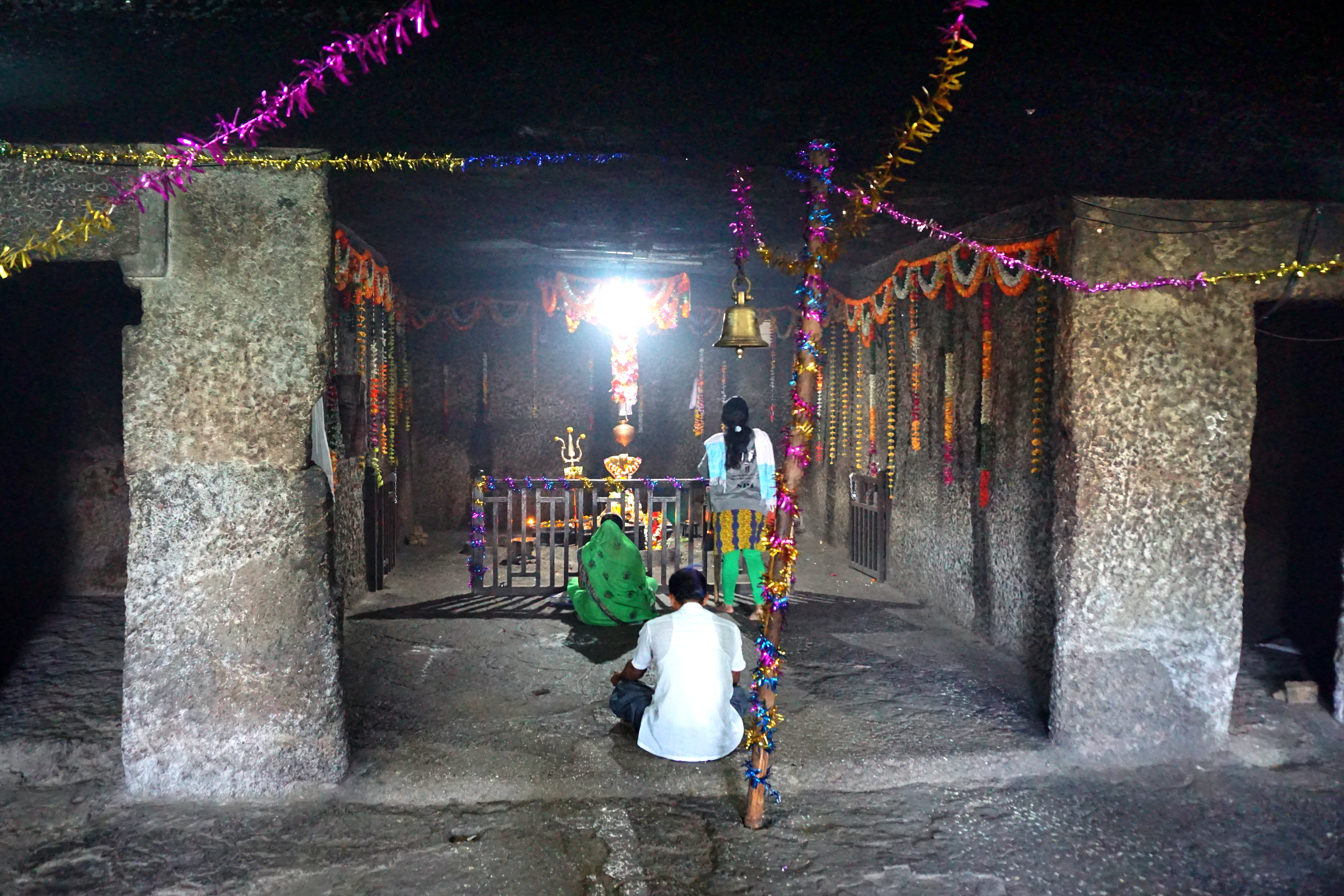
Vihara in Ghoravadi, converted into a Hindu temple.

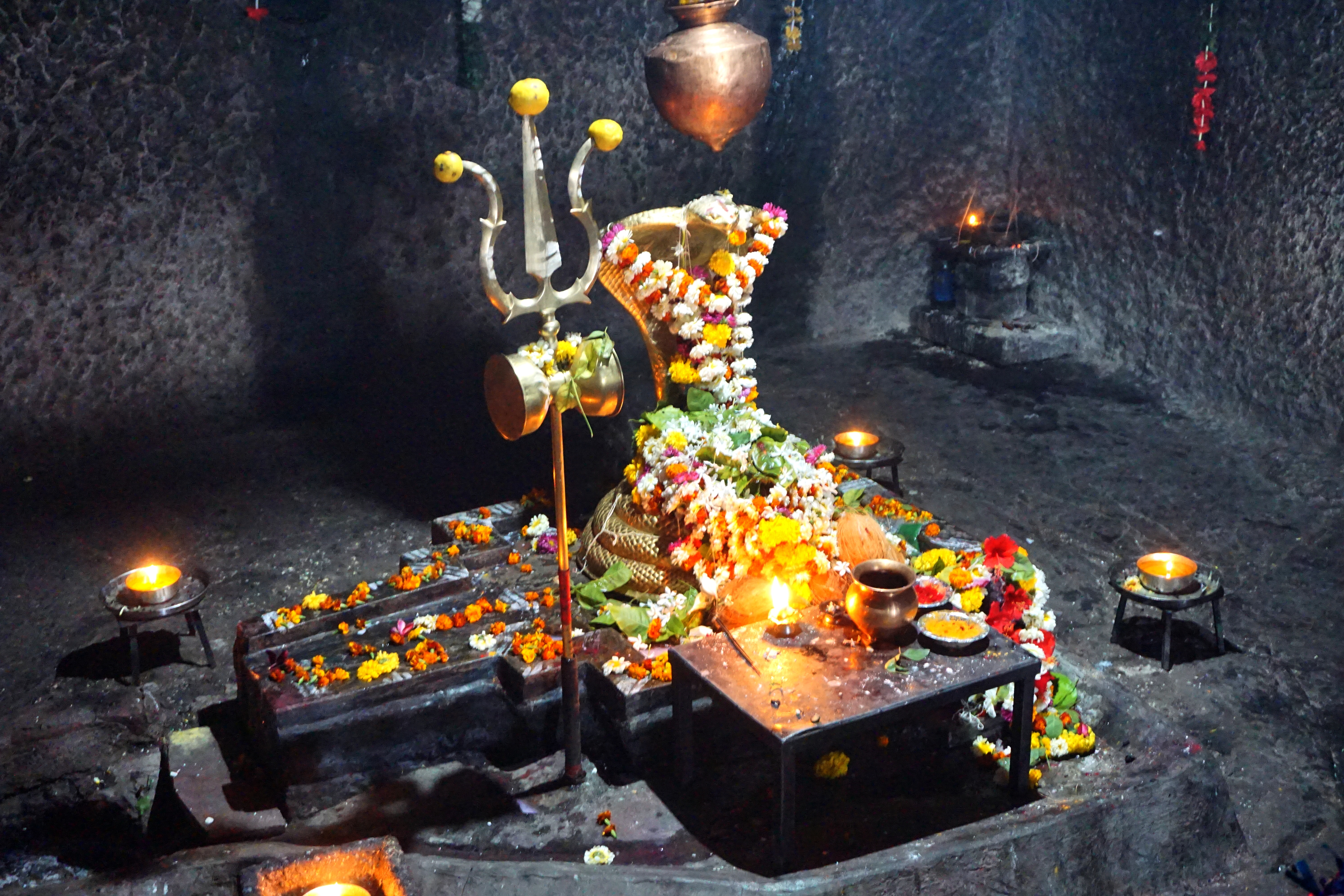
Shaivite Shrine
