= Nenavali Caves =

Buddhist cave in Raigad district, India

Nenavali Caves Khadsamble Caves
- Location within India Location within Maharashtra
- Coordinates: 18.506954°N 73.335075°E

Nenavali Caves, also Khadsamble Caves, are located at Sudhagad in Raigad, India. This is a group of 37 Buddhist caves about 35 km from Pali, carved in the first century B.C.
