= Mahakali Caves =

Caves in Maharashtra state of India

Kondivite Caves
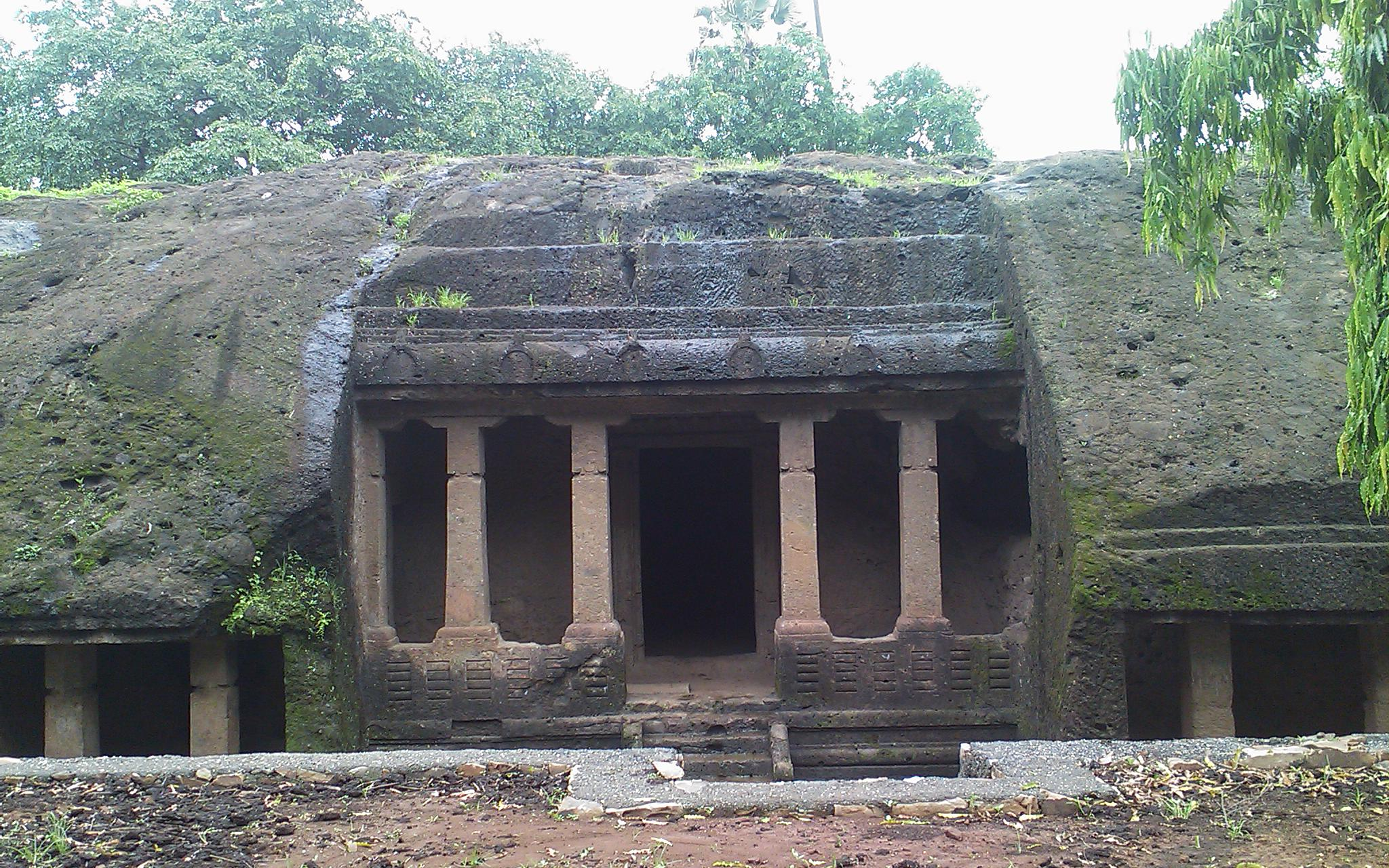
- Cave 3

- Location within India Location within Maharashtra
- Location: Andheri (East), Near Caves road, Mumbai
- Coordinates: 19.130436°N 72.874133°E
- Elevation: 70 m (230 ft)
- Geology: Basalt
- Entrances: 20
- Difficulty: easy

The Mahakali Caves are a group of 19 rock-cut monuments built between 4th century BCE and 6th century CE.

This Buddhist monastery is located in the eastern suburb of Andheri in the city of Mumbai in western India. The monument consists of two groups of rock-cut caves – four caves more to the north-west and 15 caves more to the south-east. Cave 9 of the south-eastern group is a chaitya. Caves in the northwest have been created mainly in the 4th – 5th century, while the south-eastern group is older. The monument contains also rock-cut cisterns and remnants of other structures.

Caves are carved out of a solid black basalt rock, (volcanic trap breccias, prone to weathering).

The largest cave at Kondivite (Cave 9) has seven depictions of the Buddha and figures from Buddhist mythology but all are mutilated. Hewn from the same rock as Jogeshwari, this cave, also called Kondivite, is believed to have been carved between the first century BC and the 6th century AD. Its Chaitya wall is built in the manner of Emperor Ashoka's Sudama cave in Bihar, and the cave has a stupa and a hemispherical dome.

It is located near the junction between the Jogeshwari-Vikhroli Link Road and SEEPZ. The road that connects these monuments to Andheri Kurla Road is named Mahakali Caves Road after it. The caves are located on a hill that overlooks the Jogeshwari-Vikhroli Link Road and the SEEPZ++ area. A Direct bus run by the BEST links the caves with Andheri station. The caves were in danger of being encroached upon, but now it is steel fenced on the roadside and walled on the hillside.

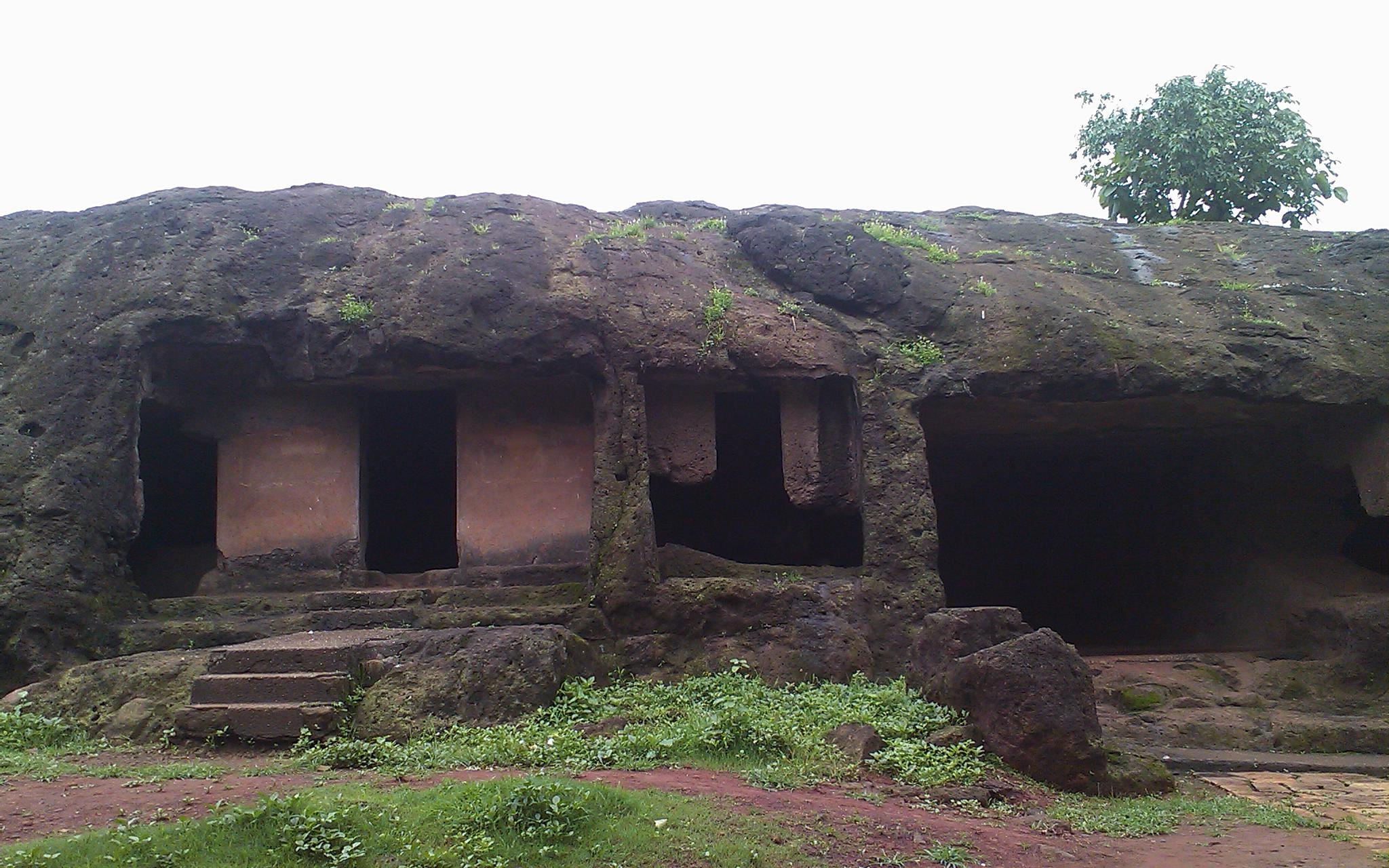
Kondivite Caves

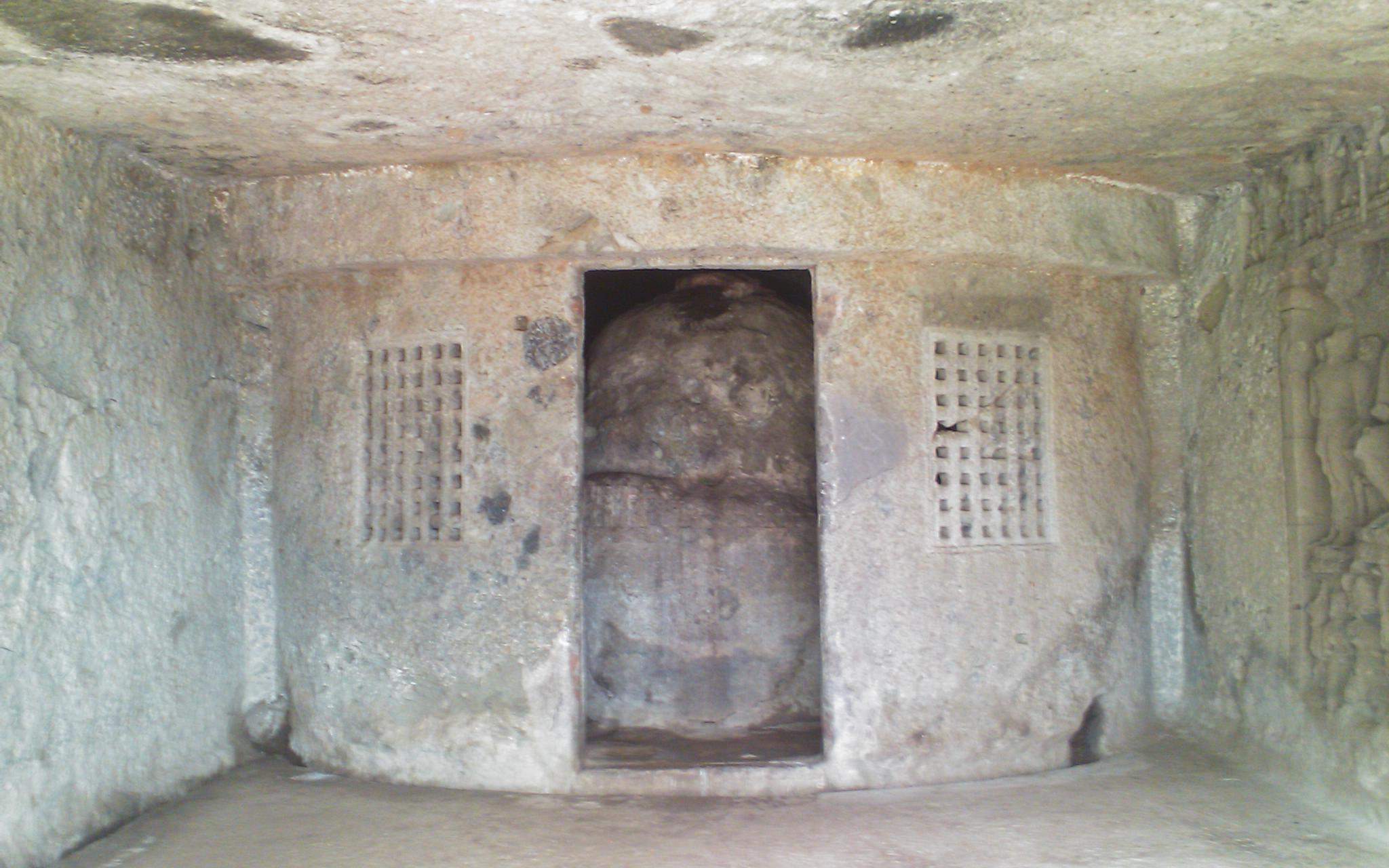
Internal stupa in Cave 9.

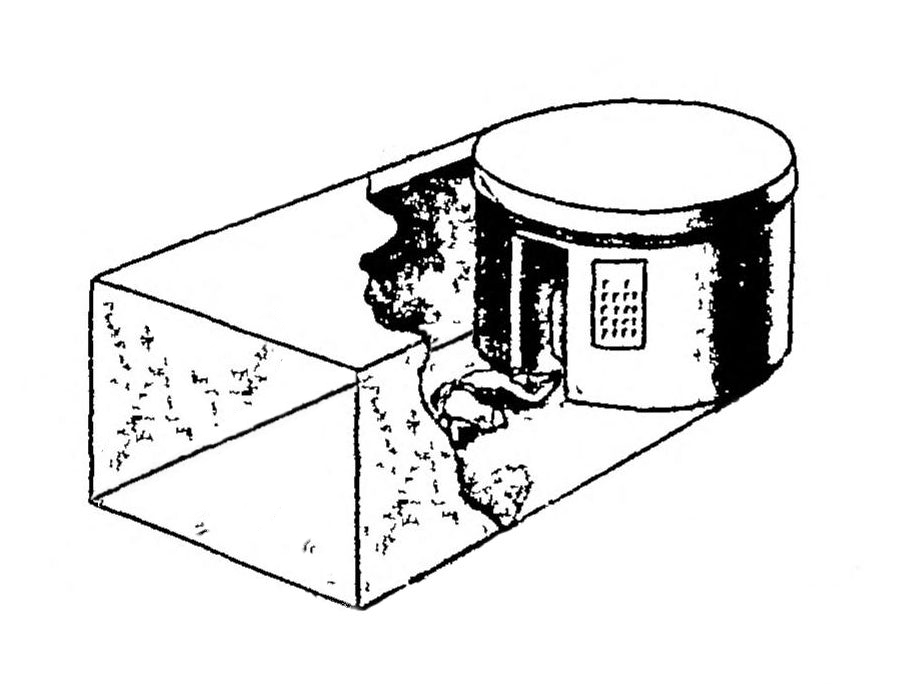
Volume plan of Cave 9.

== See also ==
- Indian rock-cut architecture
