= Shirwal Caves =

Buddhist cave in Maharashtra, India

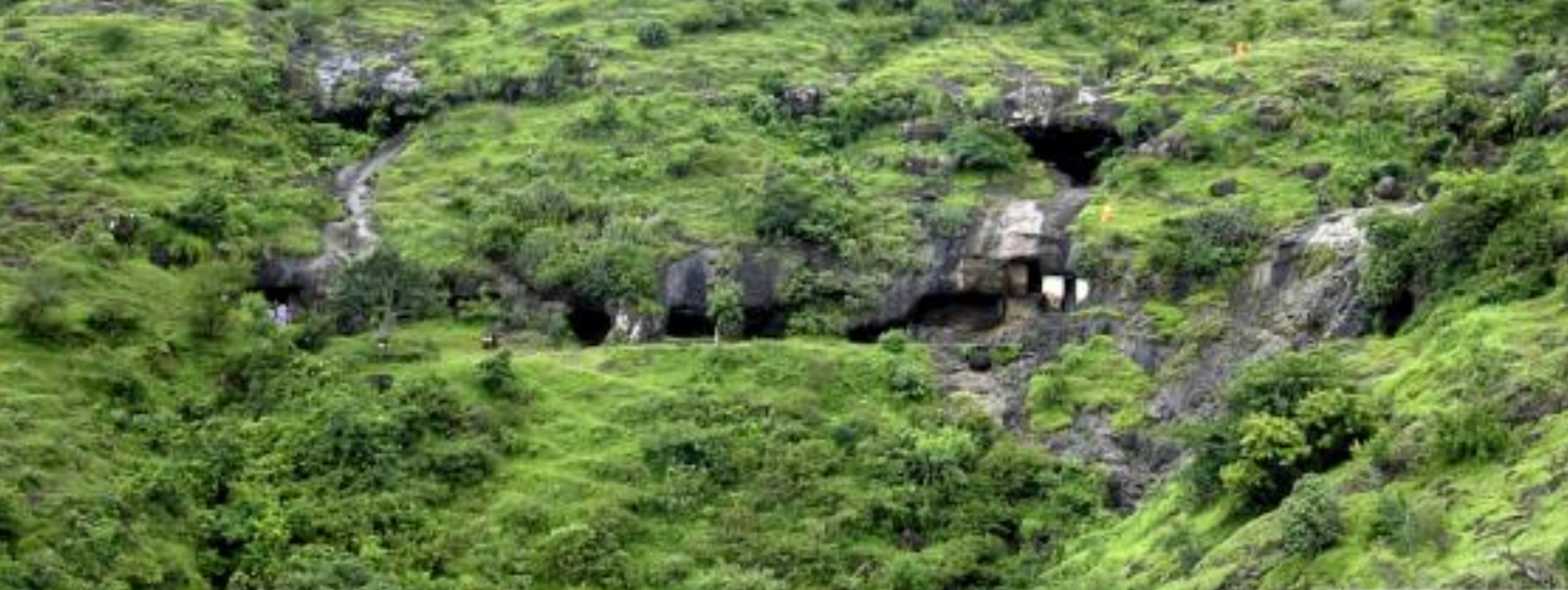
- Shirwal Caves

- Location within India Location within Maharashtra
- Coordinates: 18.1433937°N 73.939501°E

Shirwal Caves are a group of 15 Buddhist caves located in a small village called Shriwal, 48 km south of Pune, India.

One is Chaitya and 14 Caves represent Vihara. All caves are plain belonging to the early phase of Buddhism.
