= Panhalakaji Caves =

Cave complex in Maharashtra, India

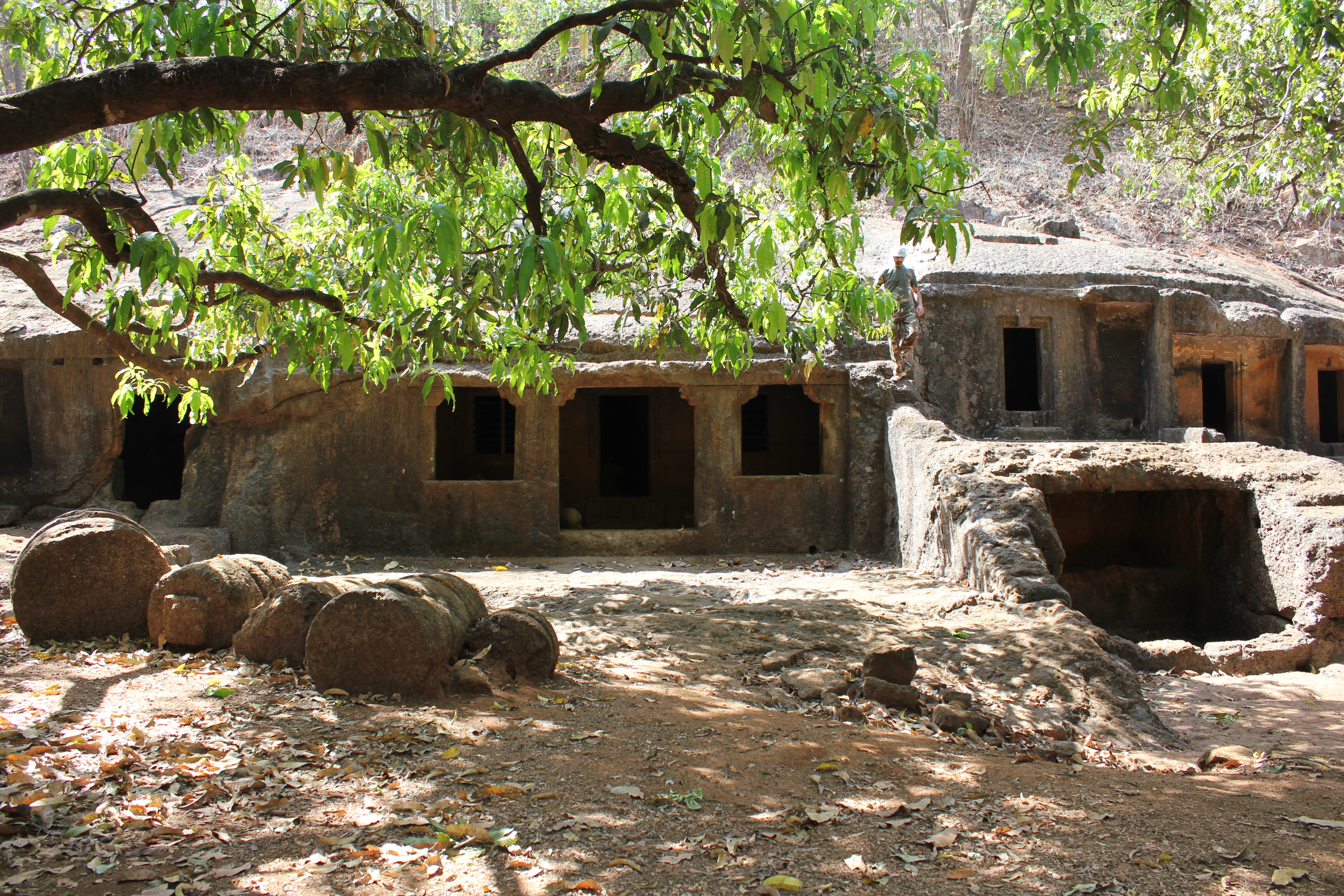
- Panhalakaji Caves

- Location within India Location within Maharashtra
- Coordinates: 17.645678°N 73.245072°E

Panhalakaji Caves are situated in the Ratnagiri district of Maharashtra state, about 160 km south of Mumbai, India. The cave complex has around 30 Buddhist and Hindu caves. The Hinayana sect began carving caves in the 3rd century AD, beginning with the stupa in the current Cave 5. The caves have inscriptions in Brahmi and Devanagari script. In the 10–11th century AD another Buddhist group, a Vajrayana sect, established cave 10 with their deities Akshobhya and Mahachandaroshana, and strengthened their practice in that region. Shiva and Ganpatya worship started at the site during Silahara rule. There are total 29 caves, out of which 28 are situated on the right bank of the mountain stream Kotjai.

A list of important caves includes:

- Cave 10 has an image of Maha-Chandraroshana. This deity is shown on the stupa, which signifies the connection of Ratnagiri with ancient Buddhist sites of Orissa.
- Cave 14 has deities of Nath Pantha.
- Cave 19 has shivlinga in it. It has Hindu scriptures on its ceiling.
- Cave 29 was used by Nath Pantha and was renamed Gaur Lena.
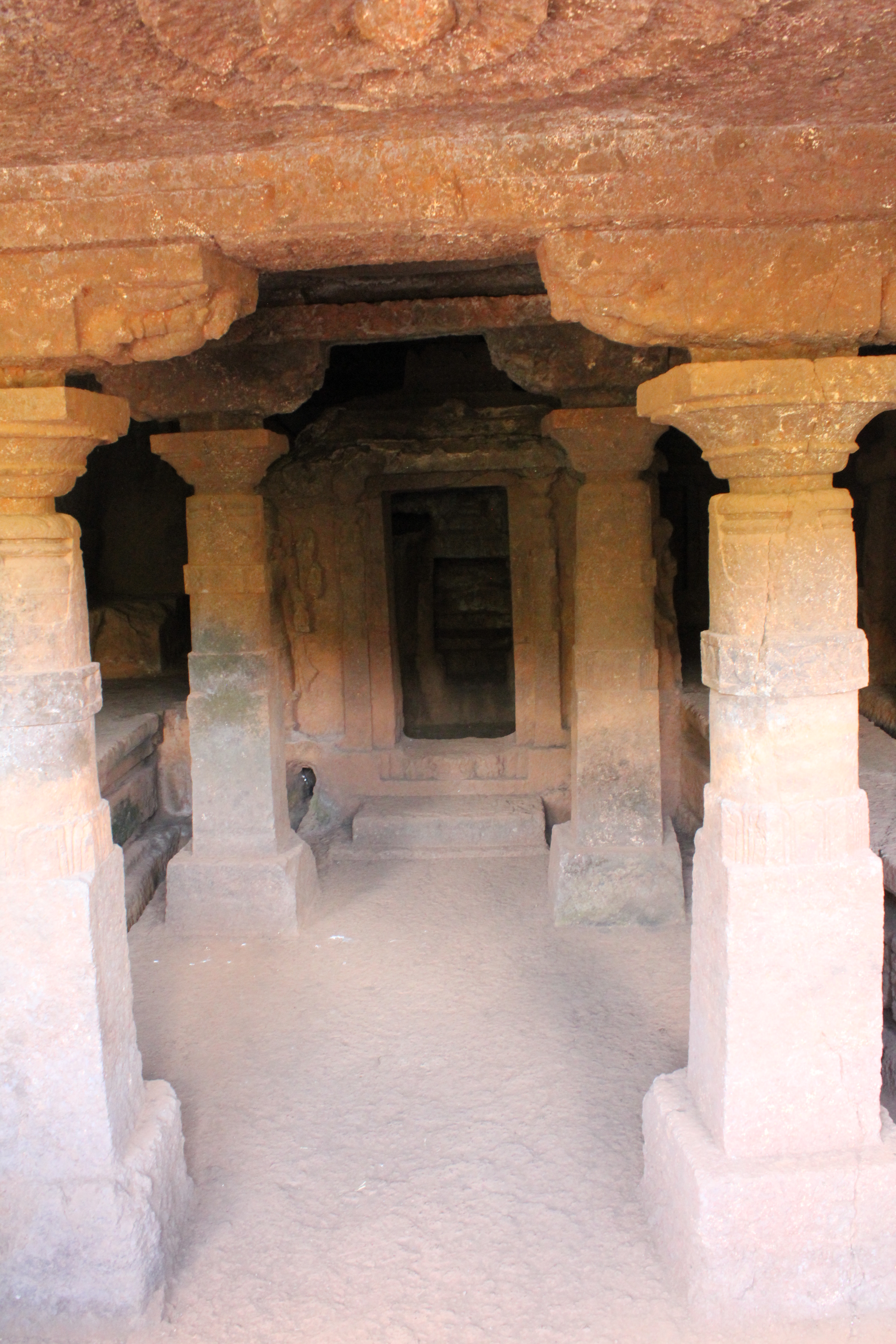
Pillars

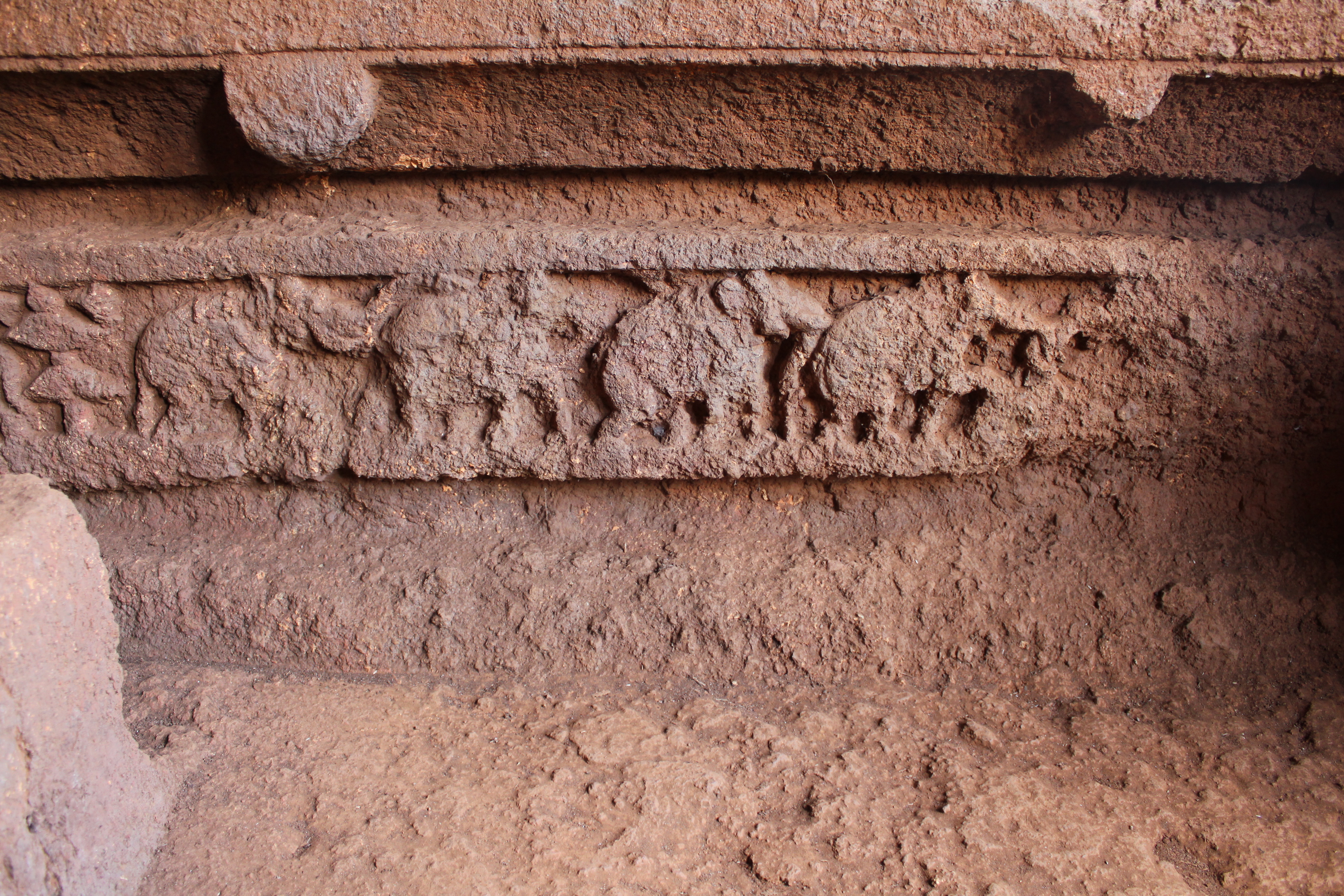
Frieze with elephants

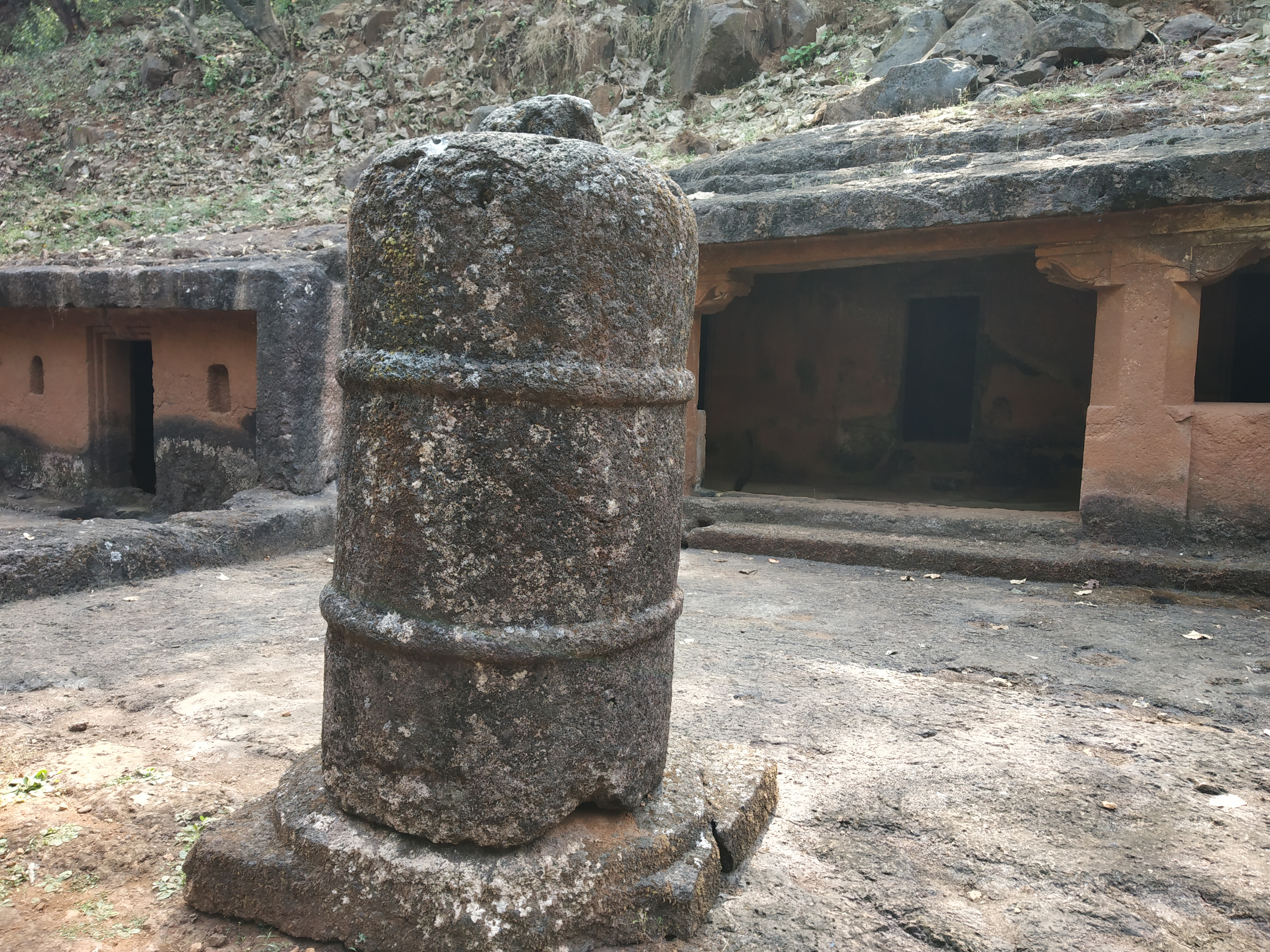
Stone pillar

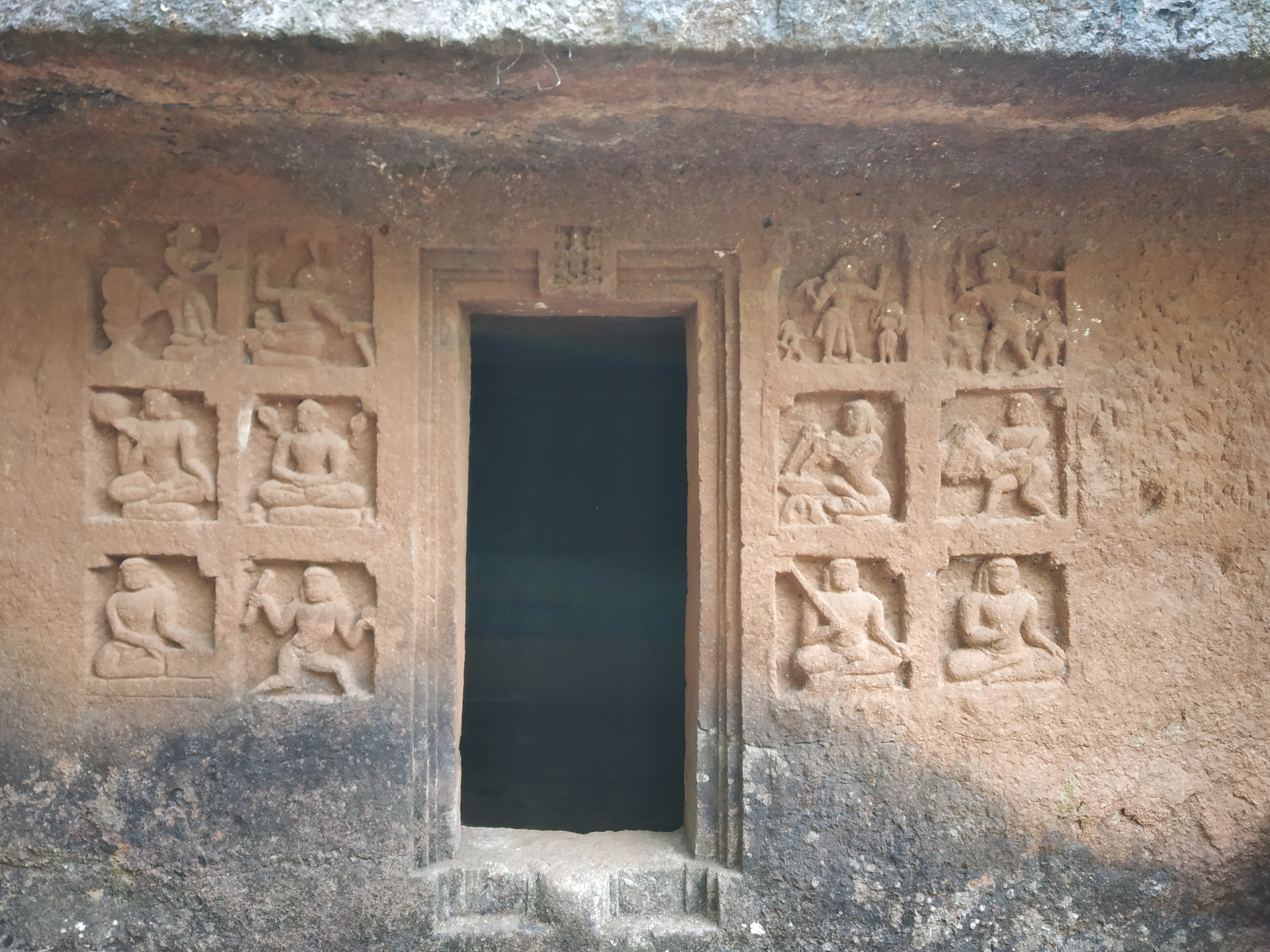
Stone carvings depicting various Mahasiddhas

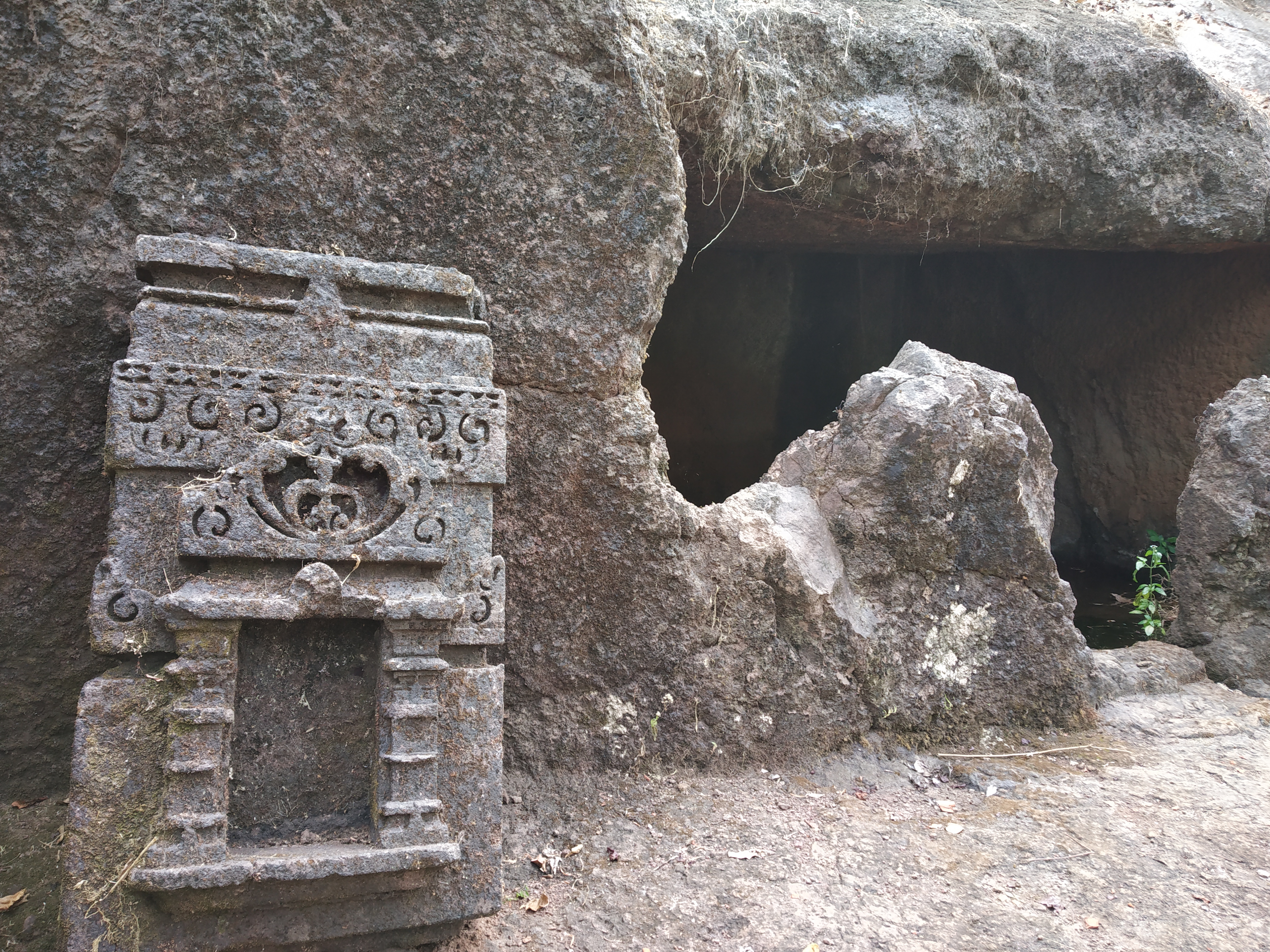
Stone carvings

== How to reach ==
- By train: Nearest Rail station is Khed, Ratnagiri.
- By road: Located on NH 4 highway near Dapoli.
