= Thanale Caves =

Buddhist caves in India (Maharashtra)

Nadsur/ Thanale Caves
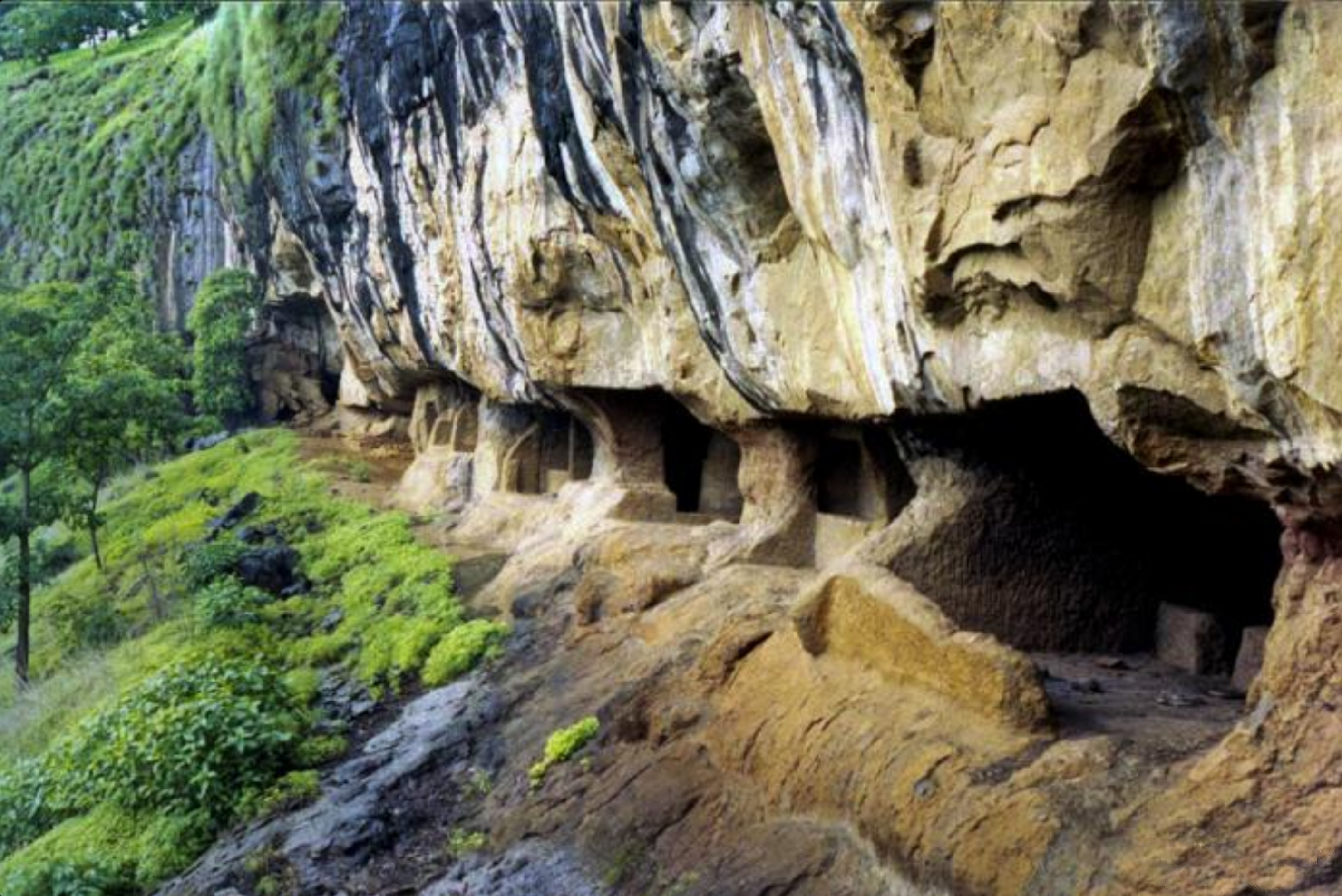
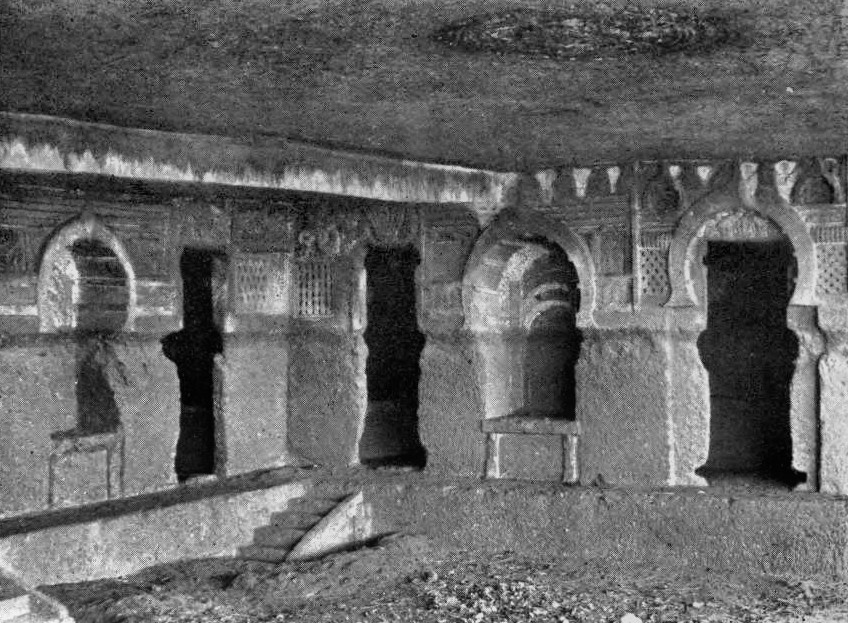
- Nadsur/Thanale caves, and inside of Vihara No.7

- Location within Maharashtra Location within India
- 18.569222°N 73.319068°E
- Type: Buddhist caves

Thanale Caves or Nadsur Caves is a group of 23 Buddhist caves located 72 km (45 mi) to the southeast of Mumbai, in western Maharashtra, India, at Thanale Village, Taluka Sudhagad in Raigad, 18 km from Pali.

These caves belong to first century B.C. It has two chaityas, two stupas and the rest are viharas. These caves are some of the most ancient rock-cut caves not only in Maharashtra but in all India and were located at a complex site of the ancient trade route of Chaul. The earliest caves were probably excavated between 70 and 50 BC, according to paleographic evidence.

In 1891 Henry Cousens wrote, "From Nadsur it is a stiff climb and long walk to the caves, which are excavated in the side of a spur of the Ghats two miles to the east of the village... The caves are cut in a long line of trap cliff which faces nearly west, and are eighteen in number, the more important among them being the third, seventh, eighth, and fifteenth from the south end...The interior of many of the caves have been greatly damaged...the facade of almost every cave has disappeared."

Cave No 7 is the largest among all caves in the group. The whole of the wall of Cave No 7 is decorated with Buddhist Rail, Arch, and other mouldings with figures of men, women and animals. About it, Cousens wrote: "No. 7 is the most important cave in the whole group, and it also the largest...Around the three sides of this cave are cells with a bench in each, and each is provided with a small lattice window. In the south wall are three cells, in the west or back wall four, and in the north wall one. Around the three sides of the cave, and before the cell doorway, runs a low bench...The whole of the back wall, with parts of the north and south wall, are decorated with the Buddhist rail, arch, and other mouldings, with figures of men, women and animals. Shallow niches alternate with the cells doors along the walls, and each of the former is surmounted by the chaitya arch, with an imitation of wooden ribbing under its soffit..."

The caves have two notable inscriptions, showing the names of donors.

These rock-cut Buddhist caves are located in a mountainous site. The most frequently used path starts in Thanale village and goes through dense forest, along waterfalls and mountain scenery. These caves are also approachable from Village Nadsur, hence these are also referred to as Nadsur Caves. Exact GPS location is available on Google Maps and the walking trail from Thanale Village to the cave is also marked on Google Maps. Apart from this the Pune Trekkers Group has painted arrow marks along the walking trail.

These caves are on the list of Protected Monuments of Archaeological Survey of India.

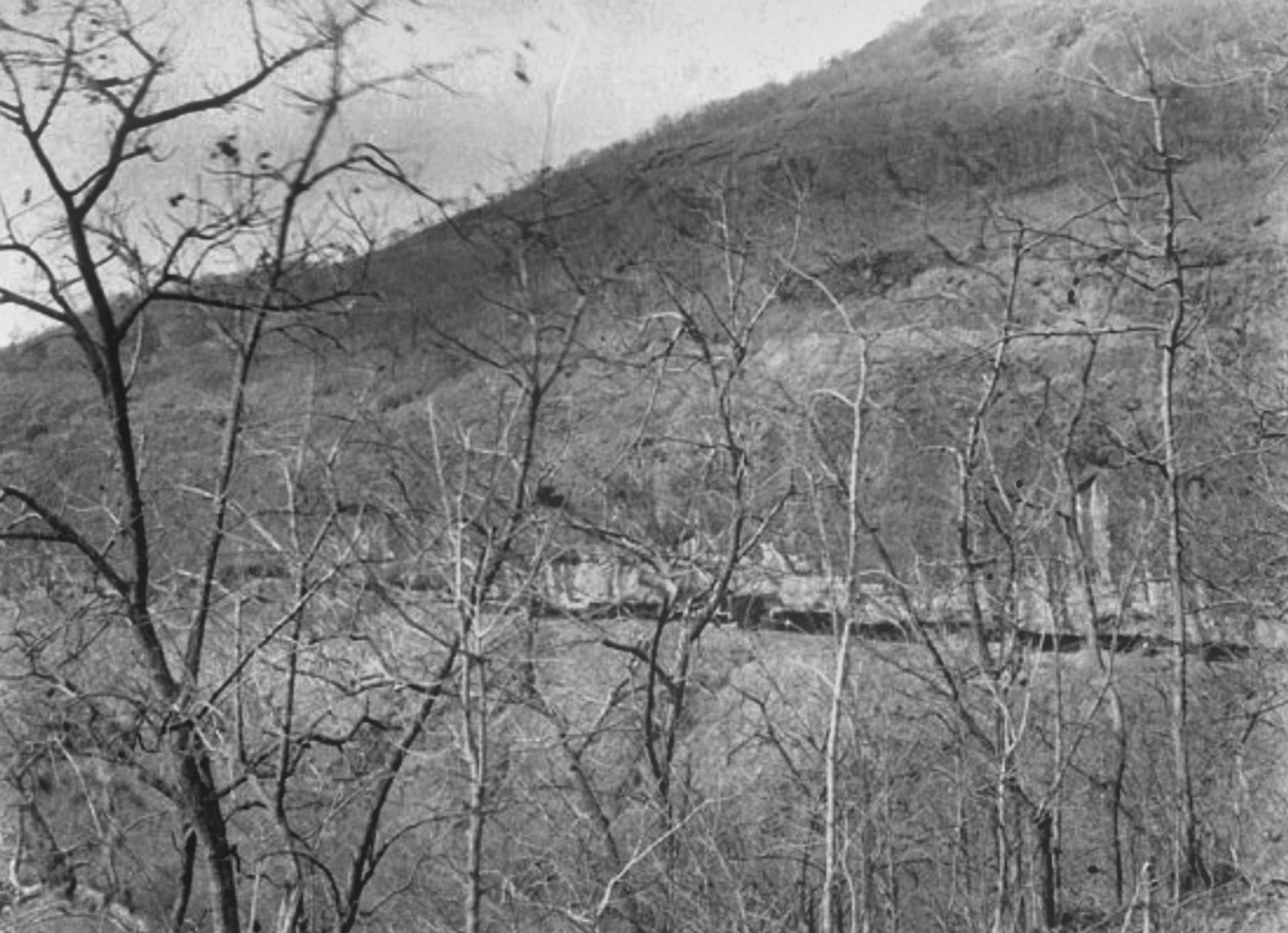
Nadsur/Thanale caves

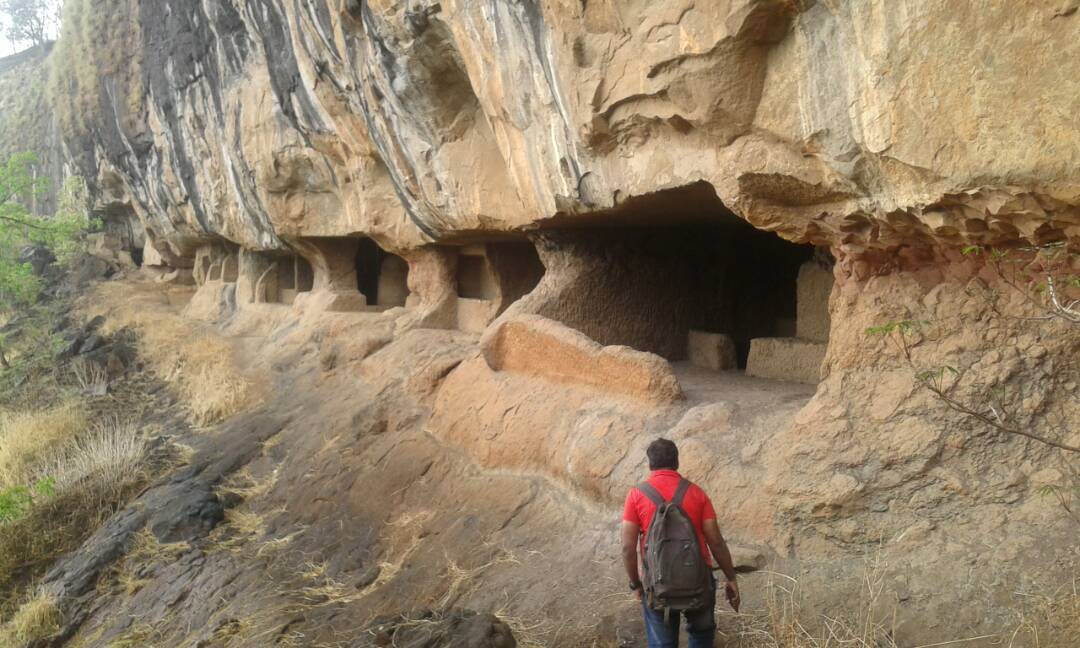
General view

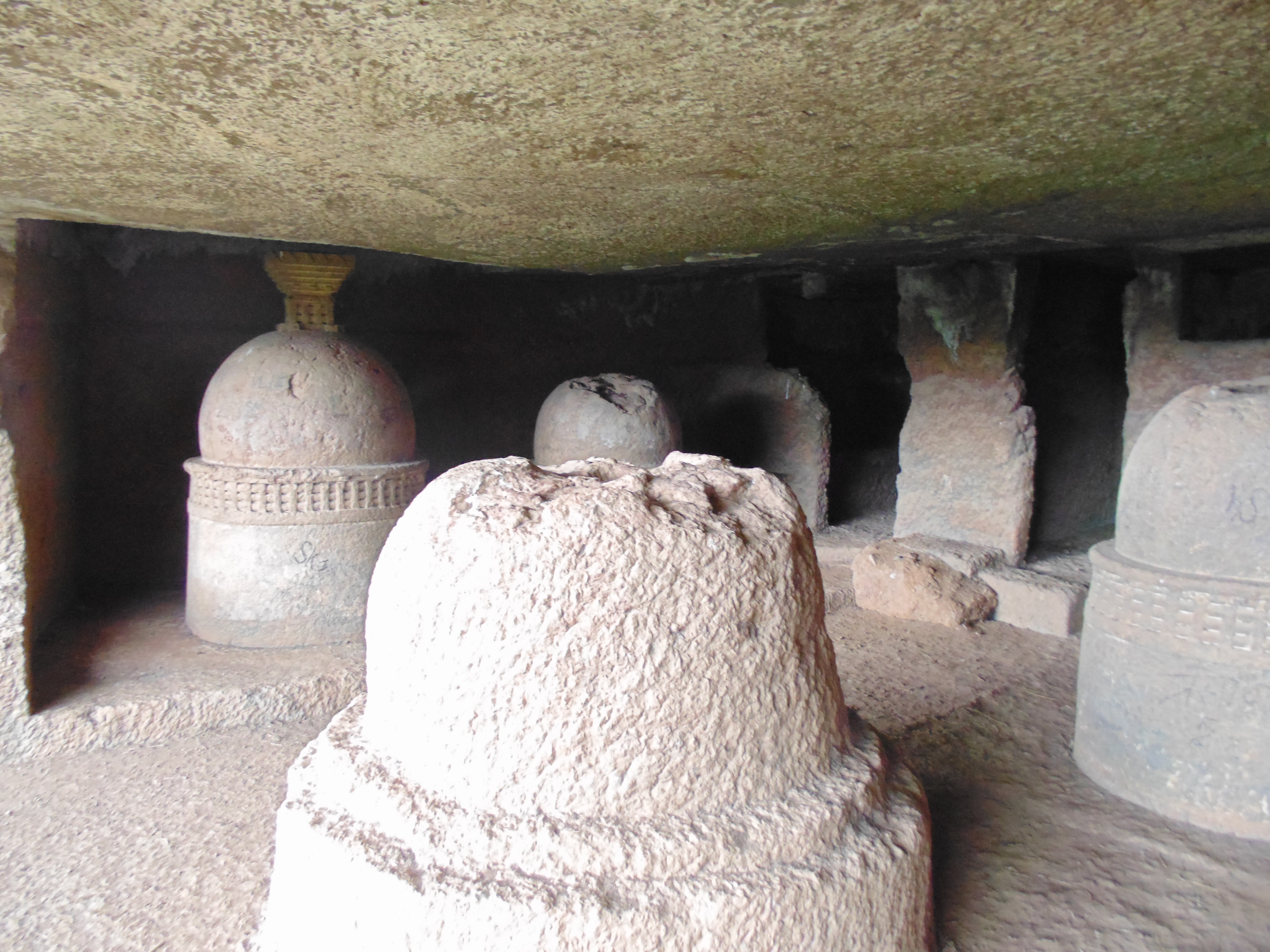
Stupas inside the caves
