= Aravidu Venkatadri =

Commander-in-Chief of the Vijayanagara Army from 1542 to 1565

Commander-in-chief of The Vijayanagara Army Governor of Kurnool
- Monarch: Sadasiva Raya

Personal details
- Born: Aravitipura, Vijayanagara Empire (present-day Kurnool district, Andhra Pradesh, India)
- Died: Talikoti, Vijayanagara Empire (present-day Bijapur district, Karnataka, India)
- Children: Rangappa; Rama Raja III
- Parent: Aravidu Sriranga Raja
- Occupation: Military

Military service
- Allegiance: Vijayanagara Empire
- Branch/service: Vijayanagara Army
- Years of service: 1542-1565
- Battles/wars: See list: Bijapur Invasion; Battle of Vijayanagara (1542); Rama Raya's Malabar Campaign; Vijayanagara Civil War (1542–1543); Capture of Penukonda (1542); Capture of Kurnool (1542); Capture of Gandikota (1542); Battle of Komali; Battle of Betamcarla; Battle of Juturu; Battle of Bedagallu; Battle of Awaku (1542); Siege of Adavani; Battle of Tungabhadra River; Battle of Adoni; Vijayanagar Invasion of Bijapur (1543); Battle of Bhima River; Battle of Khaspur; Vijaynagara-Ahmednagar War (1543); Battle of Kalyani (1543); Siege of Ahmednagar (1543); Ahmednagar invasion of Bidar; Siege of Udgir; Siege of Kandhar; Battle of Bidar; Second Vijaynagara Invasion of Bijapur (1549); Battle of Kalyani (1549); Siege of Paranda; Vijaynagara Invasion of Bijapur (1552); Capture of Raichur; Capture of Mudgal; Capture of Sholapur; Siege of Gulbarga (1552); Saif Ain-ul-Mulk's Rebellion; Battle of Bijapur; Ahmednagar Invasion of Bijapur (1557-1558); Siege of Gulbarga; Vijayanagara Invasion of Ahmednagar (1558-1559); Siege of Kalyani (1558); Siege of Ahmednagar (1558–1559); Battle of Godavari; Capture of Daulatabad; Second Vijaynagara Invasion of Ahmednagar (1561-1562); Siege of Ahmednagar (1561–1562); Vijayanagara invasion of Golconda; Battle of Tarpully; Battle of Korkul; Talikota Campaign; Battle of Talikota †

Aravidu Venkatadri also known as Venkatadri was the younger brother of Rama Raya. Rama Raya appointed him as the Commander-in-Chief of the Vijayanagara Army trusting him with the defence of the empire. During his service, Venkatadri fought many important battles against the Sultanates of Ahmednagar, Bijapur, Bidar, and Golconda. he loyally served throughout Rama Raya's reign. Venkatadri was killed along with his brother Rama Raya in the Battle of Talikota.

== Origins ==
Venkatadri was the younger brother of Rama Raya and Tirumala Raya. He was the son of Aravidu Sriranga Raja and his wife Timmamba, and the grandson of Aravidu Rama Raja I. Born into the influential Aravidu family.

== Military career ==
After the death of the Vijayanagara emperor Achyuta Deva Raya, Rama Raya and his brothers Tirumala Raya and Venkatadri rose to prominence in the empire.

=== Political Unrest In Vijayanagara ===
After the death of Achyuta Deva Raya the care of his son Venkata I was entrusted to his uncle, possibly Ranga. Instead of protecting him the uncle imprisoned Venkata I and tried to seize the throne for himself. This act split the nobles of the Vijayanagara court. Rama Raya and his brothers supported the uncle, while the Tirumala brothers stood up for Venkata I’s rightful claim as their sister's son. With the support of many nobles the Tirumala brothers demanded Venkata's release and suggested that two ministers rule the kingdom as regents. The uncle fearing the loss of his authority rejected this proposal.

==== Bijapur Invasion ====
Political unrest in Vijayanagara grew worse as many nobles unhappy with poor rule withdrew to their own regions and began to act independently. Worried about the safety of her son Venkata I Queen Mother Varadamba sought help from Ibrahim Adil Shah I of Bijapur offering him great wealth. Though Ibrahim claimed he wanted to restore Venkata I his real aim was to capture the kingdom. When his army camped near Vijayanagara the nobles quickly changed sides and placed Achyuta Deva Raya’s brother on the throne to face the common threat. Rama Raya and his commander Hande Hanumappa Nayaka successfully drove back the Bijapur forces, helped in part by a large bribe paid to Ibrahim which finally led to his withdrawal.

==== Rama Raya's Malabar Campaign ====
While campaigning in Malabar, Rama Raya left an agent in charge of the treasury and the imprisoned prince Venkata I at Vijayanagara. After returning from the successful expedition he faced resistance from a rebel chief near the capital and spent a long time trying to capture the fortress which drained his supplies. When Rama Raya asked his agent for funds the agent was tempted by the wealth under his control and secretly joined hands with the Tirumala brothers. He released Prince Venkata I distributed gold to win over the army and gathered dissatisfied nobles in support of Venkata's claim. On learning of these developments, Rama Raya quickly made peace with his enemy and rushed back to Vijayanagara.

=== Assassination of Venkata I ===
After the crisis passed Rama Raya withdrew to his estate and waited for a better chance to act. Meanwhile, Salakamraju Tirumala driven by ambition ordered the killing of his own nephew and king, Venkata I and also put to death other relatives of Achyuta Deva Raya. Afraid that the nobles might oppose him Salakamraju Tirumala summoned them to court and cruelly blinded those who arrived first. Shocked by his tyranny the remaining nobles fled to their provinces and later sought the support of Rama Raya and Ibrahim Adil Shah I to overthrow Salakamraju Tirumala and bring an end to his rule.

=== Vijaynagara Civil War (1542-1543) ===
==== War Against Salakamraju Tirumala ====
Rama Raya worked to unite support against Salaka Tirumala by sending royal orders to Hande Hanumappa Nayaka, Mesa Peddappa Nayaka, Majjahari Tulasipati, and other jagirdars asking them to gather with their troops. Answering his call, the leaders assembled at Penukonda where Rama Raya spoke about Salakamraju Tirumala's cruel actions and sought their help. He promised rich rewards and titles if they succeeded in defeating him. Mesa Peddappa Nayaka offered to collect information on Salakamraju Tirumala's movements and sent spies to gather details. With this intelligence and the combined strength of the chiefs, Rama Raya rose in rebellion against Salaka Tirumala.

==== Capture of Forts In Rayalaseema ====
Rama Raya, Tirumala Deva Raya, and Venkatadri joined to rally the nobles and protect the kingdom from falling into chaos. After leaving the capital their support grew steadily as many leaders joined their cause. As they advanced, their forces captured several important forts, including Penukonda, Adoni, Gooty, Gandikota, and Kurnool, which greatly strengthened their position.

==== Battle of Komali ====
Rama Raya moved towards the Gandikota region where the Pemmasani chief held great influence to gather more troops and strengthen his army. This step, along with the capture of Penukonda directly threatened the authority of Salakamraju Tirumala. Realizing the danger to his rule Tirumala understood that he could not delay any longer. Determined to put down the rebellion and secure his power, he prepared to face Rama Raya and his expanding forces at once.

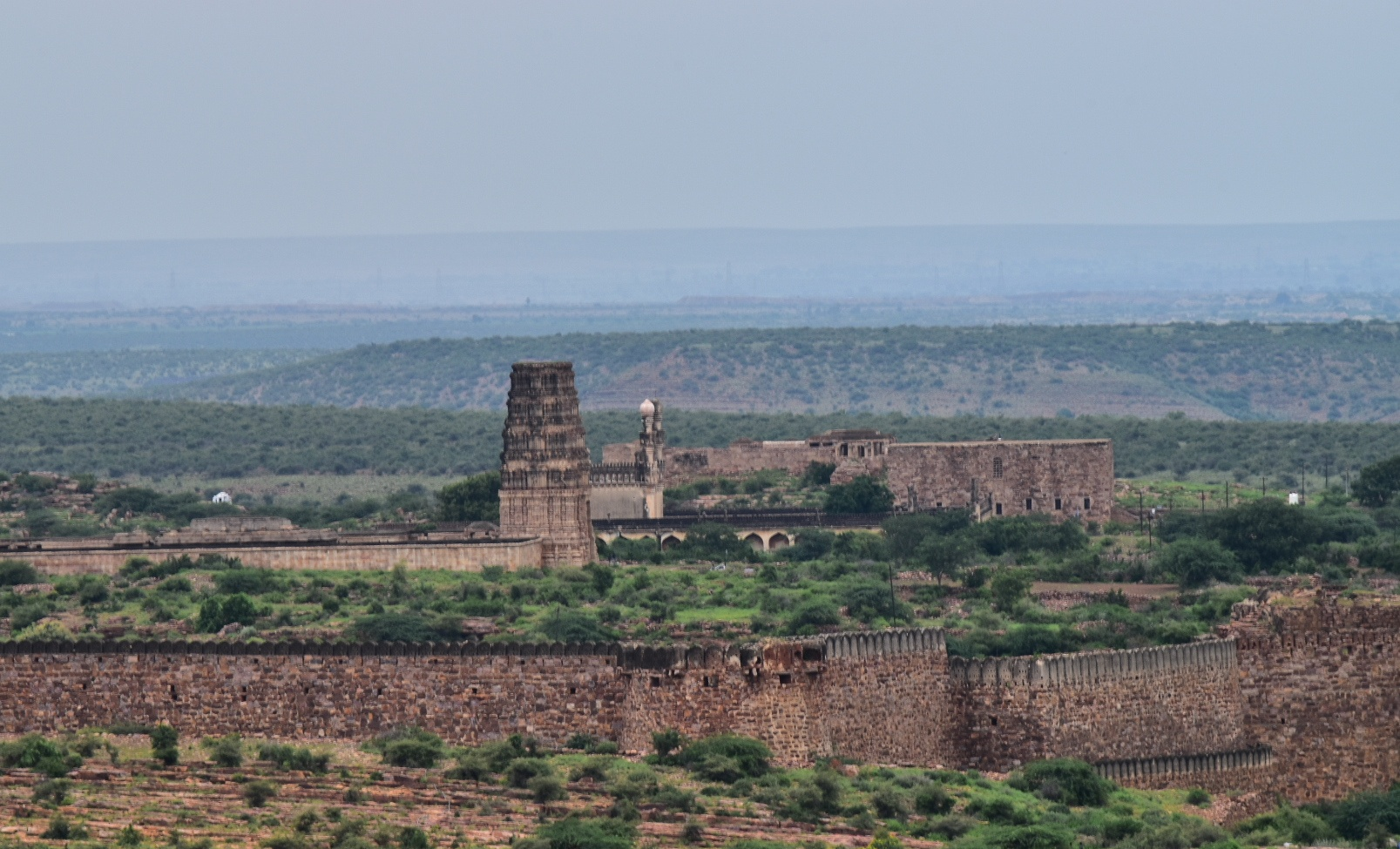
Gandikota fort from Kottapalli

Even though many nobles deserted him Salakamraju Tirumala was not completely alone. A few loyal supporters remained at his side including Salakaya the son of Mingi Baiyya Nayaka, Chintagunti Raghupati, the Palegar of Betamcherla, and his subordinate Chintagunti Siddaya Hanumayadeva. With the support of these followers Tirumala still had enough confidence and strength to march out and face Rama Raya in battle.

Salakaraju Tirumala marched to Gandikota and demanded that Pemmasani Erra Timmanayudu the ruler of the fort hand over Rama Raya. Timmanayudu refused and instead gathered the forces of nearby palegars and joined Rama Raya. Together they came out of the fort to face Salakamraju Tirumala. The two armies met in battle at Komali a village about six miles west of Tadipatri. After a fierce battle Tirumala's army was defeated and fled while Rama Raya and his allies chased the retreating forces.

==== Battle of Awaku ====
Rama Raya's army moved north into the province of Kurnool though the exact reason for choosing this route is not clearly known. It is likely that enemy forces holding two strong forts influenced this decision. Heavy fighting took place near Awaku the capital of Rama Raja Tirumala who was Rama Raya’s uncle. This campaign brought Rama Raja Tirumala great praise and he was celebrated for saving the land from the destruction caused by Salakamraju Tirumala.

During this campaign, Rama Raja Tirumala appears to have taken command of his nephew Rama Raya’s army. The move towards Awuku was a careful military choice as the town provided a strong base for attacking Bethamcherla and other important places nearby. One of the prominent commanders in this campaign was Akkaya Cina Timma Nayaka, a cousin of the Gandikota captain who showed great bravery and skill in several battles. His actions made him one of the most active and trusted officers under Rama Raja Tirumala.

==== Battle of Bhetamcherla ====
As Rama Raya’s army moved forward Salakamraju Tirumala tried to resist by gathering his remaining supporters. One of his allies Chintagunti Raghupati the chief of Bethamcherla attempted to stop the advance but was defeated and driven back into a fortress. Cina Timma Nayaka then led the siege against the stronghold and successfully captured it. After its fall the fort was destroyed.

==== Battle of Juturu ====
At Juturu Rama Raya once again faced Salakaya Tirumala who had gathered his troops to block the army's advance. A battle followed but Salakaya was defeated and forced to withdraw from the field. Rama Raya continued his march and moved on to Kurnool his ancestral seat.

==== Battle of Bedagallu ====
Although Salakaya Tirumala was defeated at the Battle of Juturu he was not completely destroyed and withdrew with the remaining troops to Bedagallu his jagir in the Adavani region. Rama Raya followed him along the upper course of the Tungabhadra River. Salakaya gathered his forces near Bedagallu and prepared to defend his territory. A fierce battle took place with both sides fighting bravely but in the end Salakaya's army lost order and fled. Unable to resist Rama Raya any further Salakaya is believed to have withdrawn to Vijayanagara to seek protection from his master.

==== Siege of Adoni ====
Adoni was the last major stronghold in the region still under the control of Salakamraju Tirumala and served as the main base of his resistance. He placed the fort under the charge of Sanjar Khan a capable Muslim officer who prepared to defend it. Soon, Cina Timma Nayaka the commander of Rama Raya laid siege to the fort and carried out a fierce attack. After heavy fighting Sanjar Khan and his troops were defeated and scattered and Adoni fell to Rama Raya’s forces. The capture of Adoni dealt a final blow to Salakamraju Tirumala's power and established Rama Raya's control over the region.

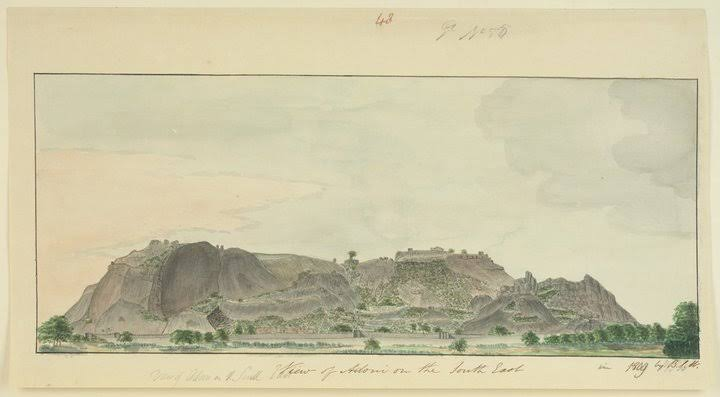
Watercolour Painting of Adoni fort by Benjamin Swain Ward (1786–1835)

==== Battle of Tungabhadra River ====
By the middle of 1543, Rama Raya marched towards Vijayanagara and Salakaraju Tirumala realized that his power and safety were in serious danger. he tried to stop Rama Raya by seeking help from Ibrahim Adil Shah I of Bijapur. To gain the Sultan's support, Tirumala agreed to accept his authority and promised to pay a large sum of three lakhs of hoons for every day the Sultan's army marched.

Salakamraju Tirumala's offer greatly tempted Ibrahim Adil Shah I as it promised both political control and large sums of money. Encouraged by his minister Asad Khan, the Sultan accepted the proposal and marched from his capital toward Vijayanagara without facing any resistance on the way. When he arrived Tirumala warmly received him and personally led him into the city. As a sign of submission Tirumala placed Ibrahim Adil Shah I on the royal throne. He then held a grand festival for several days to honor the Sultan and to strengthen his support against the advancing forces of Rama Raya.

Tirumala's alliance with Ibrahim Adil Shah I alienated the Vijayanagara nobles who still feared the memories of earlier atrocities by the Muhammadans. unable to oppose him openly they chose a careful path of false submission. Letters were sent to Tirumala admitting their fault and promising lifelong loyalty but only if he persuaded his Muhammadan ally to return to Bijapur. At the same time Rama Raya understood the tension growing within the kingdom and sent his own message. He assured Tirumala of lasting loyalty as well, provided that Ibrahim Adil Shah I withdrew back to his own land.

Believing that Rama Raya and the nobles were truly loyal once again Tirumala Raya felt he no longer required the help of his Muslim ally. To keep his promise he paid Ibrahim Adil Shah I a huge sum of fifty lakhs of hoons and also gave him many costly gifts. Pleased with this settlement the Adil Shah turned back toward his own borders and withdrew his entire army.

The withdrawal of Ibrahim Adil Shah I changed the situation completely and sparked open revolt against Tirumala. Rama Raya, along with most of the nobles who had earlier promised loyalty broke their oaths and prepared to march on Vijayanagara to punish Tirumala for his actions. Support for Tirumala quickly faded and even some of his trusted generals began to desert him weakening his army. Tirumala decided to face his enemies in one final battle before his forces fell apart. He gathered whatever troops remained, took personal command and marched to the banks of the Tungabhadra River where he set up his camp.

While camped at or near Adoni Rama Raya quietly sent spies to watch Tirumala's movements and weaken the loyalty of his soldiers. These agents entered Tirumala's camp and spread rumors that he was unfit to rule mocking his origins and turning the troops against him. They also secretly offered bribes to his captains in Rama Raya’s name which led many to think of abandoning their leader. With Tirumala's army confused and demoralized Rama Raya launched a sudden attack on the camp and caught him completely unprepared. As his commanders deserted him Tirumala fled with only a few followers but he was soon captured by Rama Raya’s officers. He was executed and his head was displayed on a flagstaff as a clear warning and a public sign of his final defeat.

After his victory on the banks of the Tungabhadra, Rama Raya ordered his army to march toward the capital. News of Tirumala's defeat reached Vijayanagara before the army arrived and was greeted with great joy by the people. Tirumaladevi and Chinnadevi the queens of the late Krishnadevaraya were pleased by the success and directed Tirumala's ministers to surrender the city. The ministers obeyed without resistance allowing Rama Raya’s forces to enter peacefully. Soon after Sadasiva Raya proclaimed as the new king, made a grand and triumphant entry into Vijayanagara along with his regent Rama Raya. His coronation followed shortly and was celebrated with great splendor and public rejoicing.

==== Battle of Adoni (1543) ====
After the revolution in Vijayanagara Salakamraju Tirumala was overthrown and Sadasiva Raya was crowned emperor. Seeing this sudden change Ibrahim Adil Shah I of Bijapur tried to take advantage of the situation. He sent his commander Asad Khan with a large army to seize the important fort of Adoni. Asad Khan laid siege to the fort and brought it close to capture which caused serious concern in Vijayanagara. Acting quickly Rama Raya responded by sending his brother Venkatadri with a strong force to defend Adoni and drive back the attackers.

When Asad Khan heard that Venkatadri was advancing he raised the siege of Adoni and moved forward to face him. A brief fight took place but Asad Khan soon realized that Venkatadri's army was much larger. He therefore withdrew in good order while Venkatadri followed him carefully for about twenty-one miles. By evening, Asad Khan stopped and made camp and Venkatadri set up his own camp nearly eight miles away to block further retreat. During the night Asad Khan planned a surprise attack. Before sunrise he led four thousand picked cavalry in a sudden assault on Venkatadri's camp catching the Vijayanagara troops unprepared. The Bijapur soldiers broke deep into the camp before any warning could be given. In the confusion Venkatadri escaped with difficulty but his treasures, family members, and elephants were captured by Asad Khan's men.

At morning Venkatadri gathered his scattered men and drew them up as if ready to fight. Seeing that Asad Khan was well prepared to hold his position and growing worried about the safety of his wife and children Venkatadri decided not to risk another battle. He withdrew a few miles and set up a fresh camp. From there he sent a message to Rama Raya explaining what had happened and asking for help. Rama Raya quickly sent more soldiers, supplies, and money, and declared that the war would go on. In private however he advised Venkatadri to act with care. He suspected that some local zamindars had encouraged Ibrahim Adil Shah's move against Adoni and that a few of Venkatadri's own officers might be secretly helping the enemy. To secure the safe return of Venkatadri's wife and family from Asad Khan Rama Raya wisely suggested making peace with Bijapur Sultanate for the time being.

Listening Rama Raya’s advice Venkatadri approached Asad Khan and won his support with a generous bribe sent by his brother. With Asad Khan acting as mediator Venkatadri opened peace talks with Ibrahim Adil Shah I and these were quickly accepted. After peace was concluded Asad Khan returned to Bijapur with the Sultan. Venkatadri having secured the safe release of his family withdrew from the field and went back to Vijayanagara.

=== First Vijaynagara Invasion of Bijapur (1543) ===
==== Battle of Bhima River (1543) ====
The death of Quli Qutb Shah in September 1543 set off fresh troubles in the Deccan. His successor Jamsheed Quli Qutb Shah of Golkonda tried to remove his brother Ibrahim who had taken shelter at Devarakonda and later fled to Bidar. There Ibrahim gained the backing of Kasim Barid who marched toward Golkonda hoping to increase his power. This alarmed Burhan Nizam Shah I of Ahmadnagar who feared Kasim's ambitions and moved to support Jamsheed Quli Qutub Shah even capturing Koheer in Barid territory. Forced to abandon his plans Kasim Barid withdrew toward Bijapur. Soon after Burhan Nizam Shah I formed an alliance against Ibrahim Adil Shah I of Bijapur, bringing together Ahmadnagar Sultanate, Golkonda Sultanate, and Vijayanagar Empire. Rama Raya of Vijayanagar joined eagerly and a joint plan was made Vijayanagar would attack Bijapur from the south, Golkonda from the east, and the Ahmednagar forces would strike from the north-east.

Acting on the alliance's plan Burhan Nizam Shah I led a campaign into Bijapur territory defeating its armies and causing widespread damage as he advanced toward Sholapur. At the same time Jamsheed Quli Qutb Shah of Golkonda captured Kakni, pushed up to the outskirts of Gulbarga and laid siege to Etgeer. On the Vijayanagar front Rama Raya sent his brother Venkatadri with a large army to seize Raichur and secure the Raichur Doab. Near the Bhima River Venkatadri defeated Ibrahim Adil Shah I’s forces and drove him from the Battlefield a victory later recorded in the Narasabupaliyam inscriptions.

==== Battle of Khaspur ====
Facing pressure from three sides, Ibrahim Adil Shah I and his ally Kasim Barid tried to ease the situation by attacking Paranda Fort on the Nizam Shahi border. This forced Burhan Nizam Shah I and his allies to turn back to relieve the fort, reducing the threat to Sholapur. Yet, when Ibrahim and Kasim attempted to block their enemies at Khaspur they were defeated and forced to flee abandoning their camp and baggage. Kasim Barid escaped toward Bidar but was chased by Jamsheed almost to the city gates. Bijapur almost collapsed and only the sudden withdrawal of Jamsheed Quli Qutub Shah who returned to Golkonda with rich spoils, saved Ibrahim Adil Shah I from disaster.

Taking advantage of this break Ibrahim Adil Shah I called his minister Asad Khan for advice and chose a policy of peace and division. He offered the Sholapur districts to Burhan Nizam Shah I who accepted the settlement as the monsoon approached. Rama Raya was also given gifts to soften his stand. With his allies gone and unrest growing at home Rama Raya had little option but to agree bringing the Bijapur campaign to an end.

==== First Battle of Kalyani ====
After defeating Jamshed Quli Qutb Shah at Golconda and returning to Bijapur, Ibrahim Adil Shah I entered into a secret alliance with Burhan Nizam Shah I of Ahmadnagar against Bidar Sultanate and Vijayanagara Empire. As agreed Burhan Nizam Shah I attacked Ali Barid Shah I of Bidar and captured the fort of Kandhar. Around this time Amir Barid Shah unaware of the secret pact went to Ibrahim Adil Shah I seeking shelter but was instead arrested by his former ally.

With Bidar weakened Ibrahim Adil Shah I then marched south and claimed to have occupied parts of the Vijayanagara Empire. However these claims are doubtful as there is no clear evidence of Vijayanagara losing any territory during this period. In fact Rama Raya later fought against Ahmadnagar showing that Vijayanagara's military strength and political power remained firm despite Bijapur's campaigns.

Rama Raya understood that the real reason for the conflict with Bijapur was the influence of Burhan Nizam Shah I of Ahmadnagar. Instead of attacking Bijapur again he chose to break the alliance between the Sultanates by moving directly against Ahmadnagar. To carry out this plan Rama Raya organized his army carefully as he had to pass through regions controlled by Golkonda Sultanate and Bidar Sultanate. He divided his forces into three parts. Rama Raya himself advanced against the Sultan of Golkonda, while his brother Tirumala Deva Raya marched toward Bidar. A third army led by Hande Hanumappa Nayaka of Sonnalapuram, moved straight into Ahmadnagar territory.

According to Hindu literary sources, this campaign included the capture of Kaliyani a major battle with the combined Sultanate armies and the sack of Ahmadnagar. While the Vasucharitramu gives few details, the Annals of Hande Anantapuram describe the events clearly. After the three Vijayanagara armies reunited they fought the allied forces of Ahmadnagar Sultanate, Golkonda Sultanate and Bidar Sultanate and won a victory. As their troops defeated the three Sultans fled the field and during the pursuit Hande Hanumappa Nayaka captured Burhan Nizam Shah I.

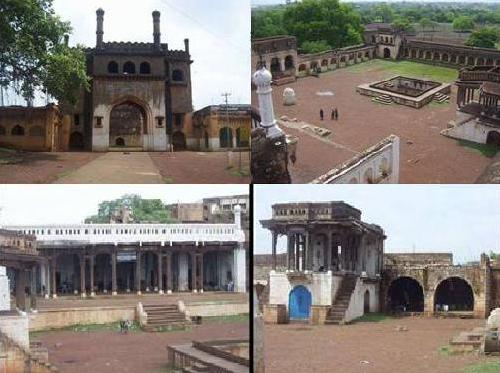
Basava Kalyan Fort

==== Siege of Ahmednagar (1543) ====
After capturing Burhan Nizam Shah I, Rama Raya continued his march and laid siege to Ahmadnagar. The city could not resist the strong Vijayanagara army for long and soon fell. Rama Raya ordered the capital of the Nizam Sultans to be destroyed and according to the Ramarajiyamu castor seeds were sown on its ruins as a symbol of complete ruin. Because of this act the poem praises him as the “Destroyer of the Fortifications of Ahmadnagar.” With Burhan Nizam Shah I held captive Rama Raya achieved his main aim by forcing him to break his alliance with Ibrahim Adil Shah I of Bijapur. Having secured this political victory Rama Raya released the Sultan and returned to Vijayanagara.

=== Ahmednagar Invasion of Bidar ===
After his defeat in the war of 1544 AD, Jamsheed Quli Qutb Shah of Golkonda remained bitter and looked for a chance to take revenge on Ali Barid Shah I of Bidar. Once his army was strengthened he marched against Bidar forcing Ali Barid to prepare for war. The two forces met at Narayankerra, where a battle took place but neither side gained a clear victory. When Jamsheed later turned his attention toward Kaulas Fort Ali Barid struck suddenly at the Qutb Shahi camp at Narayankerra, defeated Jamsheed's troops and forced him to withdraw.

Though defeated Jamsheed Quli Qutub Shah quickly recovered and captured Kaulas Fort, Narayankerra, and Ahswabad. To strengthen his position he invited Burhan Nizam Shah I of Ahmadnagar to support him. Burhan still angry with Ali Barid for refusing help during the Battle of Hoorchean in 1546 AD, readily agreed. Seeking revenge, Burhan Nizam Shah I marched against Bidar and began the campaign by laying siege to Ausa.

==== Battles of Ausa and Narayankerra ====
Fearing Burhan Nizam Shah I’s advance, Ali Barid Shah I asked Ibrahim Adil Shah I for help and offered to hand over Kalyani in return. Ibrahim agreed and sent Yekhlas Khan with five thousand cavalry to defend Bidar. The forces of Bijapur Sultanate and Bidar Sultanate joined at Kalyani and fought Burhan's army near Ausa and the Golkonda troops at Narayankerra. In both battles the allied armies were defeated leaving Bidar badly exposed.

==== Capture of Udgir and Kandhar ====
After his victory at Ausa, Burhan Nizam Shah I moved against Udgir and captured the fort. Encouraged by this victory he advanced further and laid siege to Kandhar. Though the defenders resisted bravely they were overcome in battle and Kandhar soon fell into Burhan's hands without further resistance.

At the same time Rama Raya of Vijayanagara sent troops under his brother Venkatadri to support his Ahmednagar and Golconda allies against Bidar. Soon after Jamsheed Quli Qutb Shah marched from Kaulas Fort and joined Burhan at Ausa. With their forces united Jamsheed led an advance on Medak and captured the fortress from Ali Barid's officers, further weakening the power of the Bidar Sultanate in the region.

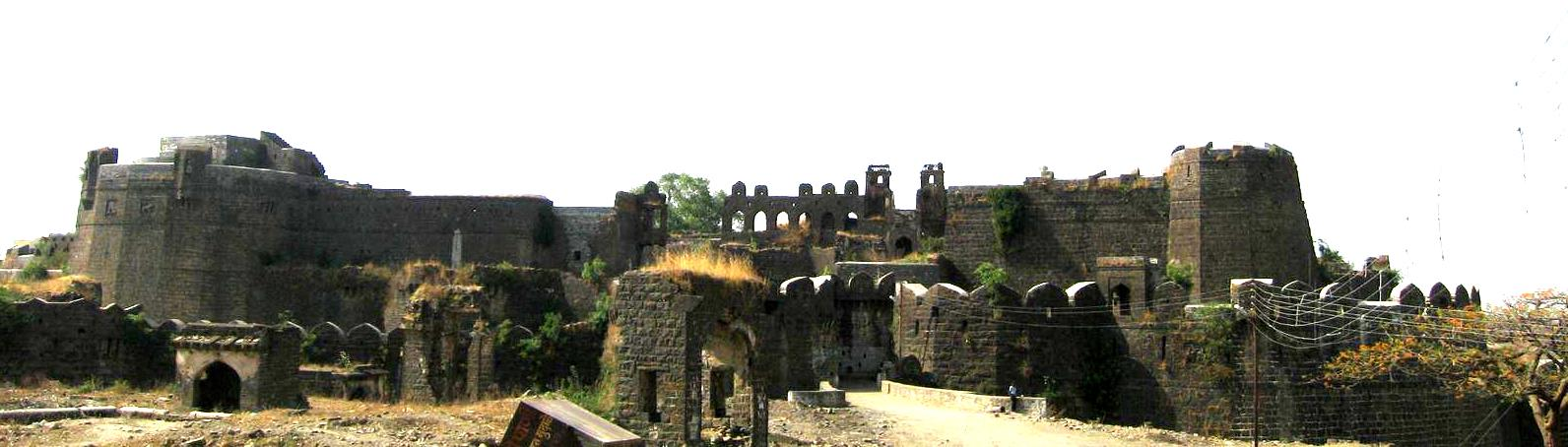
Udgir Fort

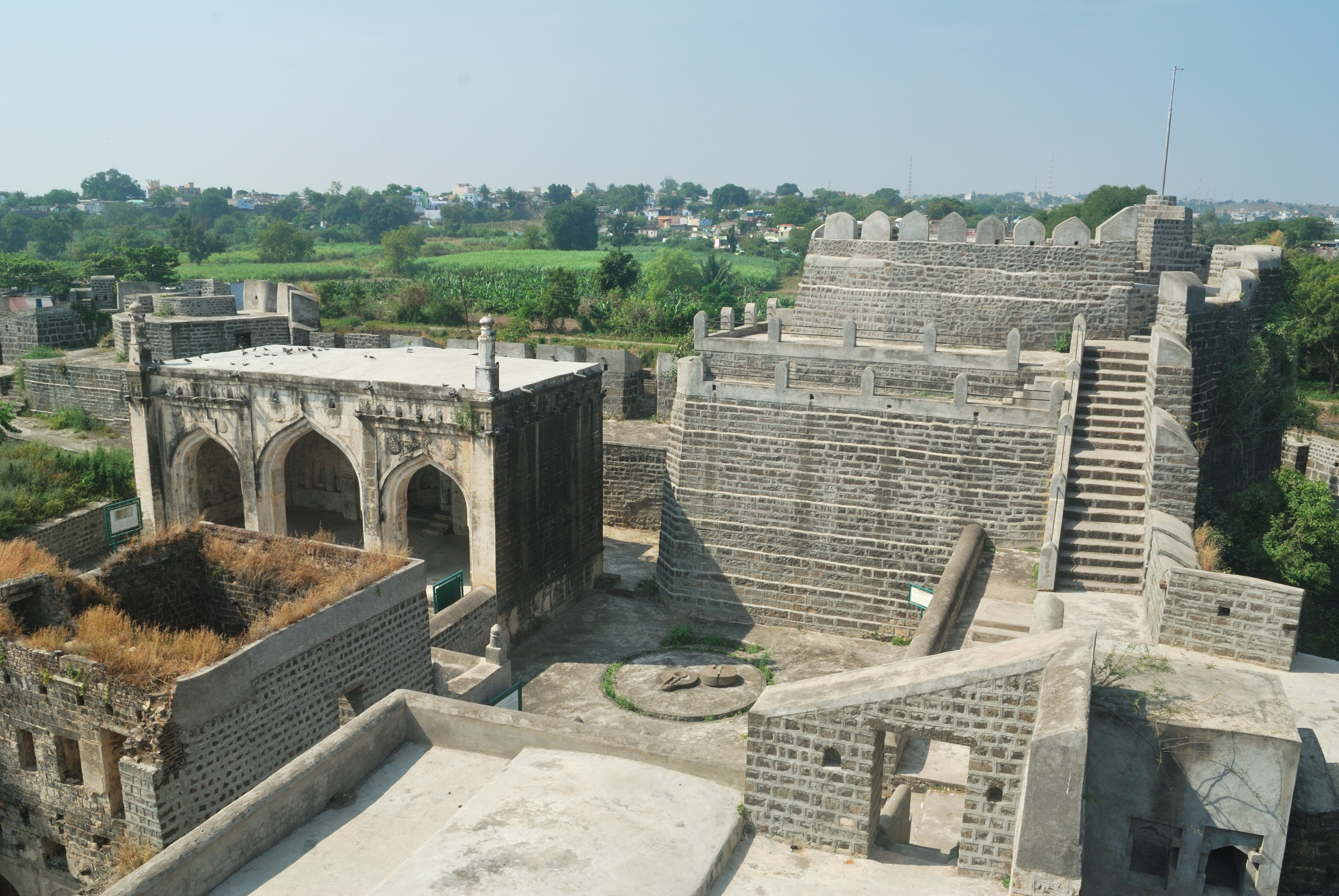
Kandhar fort

==== Battle of Bidar ====
Venkatadri led the Vijayanagara Army against Ali Barid's forces during the campaign. A battle took place between the two sides and Venkatadri won a clear victory. The enemy army was defeated and forced to withdraw. Venkatadri captured Ali Barid Shah I’s royal insignia and military band.

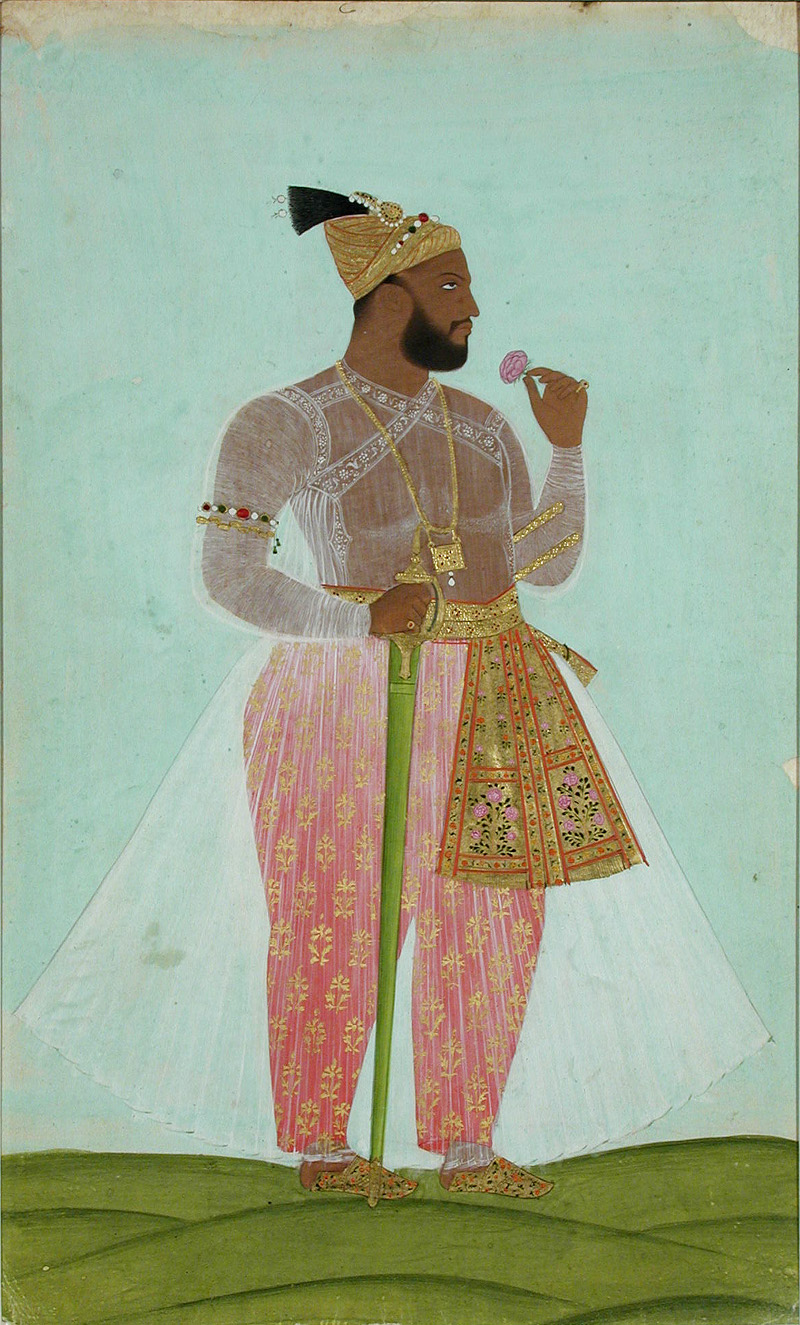
Ali Barid Shah of Bidar

=== Second Vijaynagara Invasion of Bijapur (1549) ===
==== Second Battle of Kalyani ====
After his plans failed during Abdulla's rebellion against his brother Ibrahim Adil Shah I. Burhan Nizam Shah I tried to secure his position by forming an alliance with Rama Raya. After the death of Asad Khan, Burhan sent envoys with gifts to Rama Raya proposing friendship and cooperation, which Rama Raya accepted with gifts in return. This growing alliance alarmed Ibrahim Adil Shah I who openly insulted the Vijayanagara ambassadors staying at his court. They were treated so harshly that they left Bijapur in anger and reported to Rama Raya that their lives were in danger. Deeply offended by this insult, Rama Raya encouraged Burhan Nizam Shah I to move against Ali Barid Shah I an ally of Bijapur and advised him to capture Kalyani. Acting together Burhan launched the campaign with Vijayanagara Army actively supporting him during the siege of Kalyani.

Burhan Nizam Shah I first moved against Sholapur but on Rama Raya’s advice he turned his attention to the more important fort of Kalyani. The combined armies of Ahmadnagar Sultanate and Vijayanagara Empire marched there and began the siege. Alarmed by this Ibrahim Adil Shah I marched out to help his ally Ali Barid Shah I and relieve the fort. However, when he faced the allied forces he was defeated and forced to retreat. With Ibrahim driven away the allies cut off all contact between Kalyani and the outside and the garrison soon began to suffer from hunger.

Determined to save the fort Ibrahim Adil Shah I returned once more and camped close to the allied army. Burhan Nizam Shah I strengthened his siege works and continued the attack. Ibrahim then sent his fast Maratha cavalry to harass the besiegers making sudden raids and cutting their supply routes. As these attacks continued, food became scarce in the allied camp causing hardship and slowly weakening their position.

As the siege of Kalyani continued and food became scarce, Burhan Nizam Shah I held a council to decide what to do next. Some nobles advised retreat, but others including Shaikh Jafar and Qasim Beg urged a surprise attack on Ibrahim Adil Shah I’s camp. This plan was supported by Vijayanagara commanders Sadasiva Nayak and Bhopal Rai, who were confident after earlier successes. Acting on this advice Saifuddin Ain-ul-Mulk led a sudden assault on the Bijapur camp, catching the enemy completely unprepared.

The attack threw Ibrahim Adil Shah I’s camp into confusion. Taken by surprise while bathing, he fled in haste towards Bid and then Paranda leaving his camp and supplies behind. His army scattered in disorder, abandoning tents, baggage, and stores. After the battle Rai Chaitpal a former officer of Burhan Nizam Shah I who had defected to Bijapur side was captured. To set an example against betrayal Burhan Nizam Shah I ordered his execution.

The defeat of the Bijapur army terrified the commandant of Kalyani. Seeing no hope of winning he sent a message to Burhan Nizam Shah I asking for mercy. He promised to surrender the fort in exchange for the safety of his life and property. Burhan agreed to his terms and the fort of Kalyani was captured giving a major victory to the Allied Army.

==== Siege of Paranda ====
After losing at Kalyani, Ibrahim Adil Shah I tried to attack Ahmadnagar to protect his lands. He quickly reached Paranda found it open, and captured it easily. He gave the fort to a loyal officer and raided nearby districts, taking wealth and tributes. When Burhan Nizam Shah I marched to stop him Ibrahim retreated to Bijapur with his spoils. The Bijapuri governor left Paranda in fear causing the garrison to abandon it. Burhan returned three days later and regained the fort without a fight. Angry at the governor's cowardice, Ibrahim ordered him to be executed.

=== Third Invasion of Bijapur (1552) ===
==== Capture of Raichur and Mudgal ====
After the successful campaign against Bijapur, Ibrahim Adil Shah I tried to take back the important fort of Kalyani. Burhan Nizam Shah I asked Rama Raya for help. Rama Raya sent ambassadors and agreed to join the alliance. The two leaders met near Raichur to plan their strategy. Rama Raya would capture Raichur and Mudgal, while supporting Burhan in taking Sholapur and Gulbarga. The allied forces took Raichur by force and Mudgal surrendered without a fight. Rama Raya then left his brother Venkatadri in charge to help Burhan with the campaign and returned to Vijayanagar.

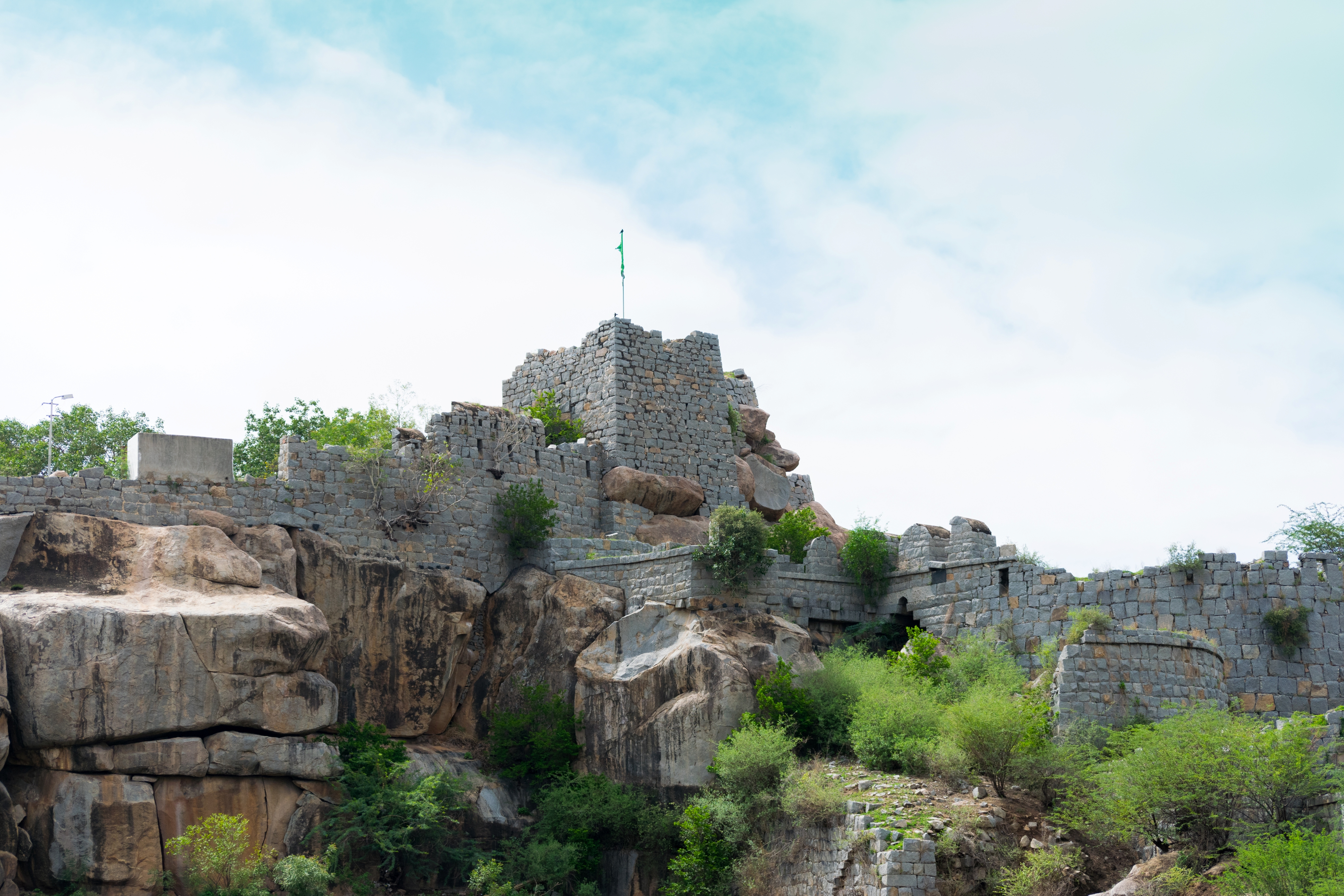
Raichur Fort

==== First Siege of Gulbarga (1552) ====
With Venkatadri's help the Sultan of Ahmadnagar quickly captured Sholapur and strengthened its defenses before returning to his capital. However, the attempt to take Gulbarga failed. According to Ahmadnagar's records, Burhan Nizam Shah I was left without support when Rama Raya returned to Vijayanagar leaving the army too weak to continue. Misunderstandings between Burhan and Venkatadri may have caused this. Soon after, Burhan Nizam Shah I died and his son Hussain Nizam Shah I became the ruler. To ensure peace, Hussain held talks with Ibrahim Adil Shah I. The two kings met at their border discussed their differences and reached an agreement ending the war for a time.

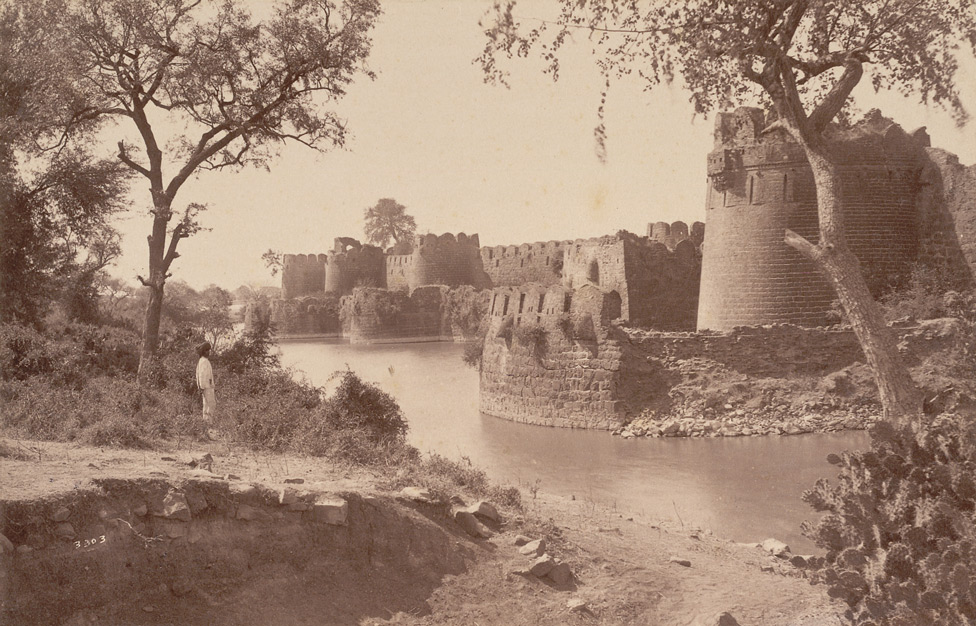
Gulbarga Fort.

=== Saif Ain-ul-Mulk's Rebellion ===
In 1552, Burhan Nizam Shah I with the support of Rama Raya captured and strengthened Sholapur. After Burhan's death peace was briefly made between his son Hussain Nizam Shah I and Ibrahim Adil Shah I but conflict soon returned. Encouraged by Khwaja Jahan and advised by Saif Ain-ul-Mulk, Ibrahim supported Prince Ali Nizam Shah's claim to the Ahmadnagar throne, promising Bijapur the forts of Kalyani and Sholapur. The rival armies met near Sholapur where Saif led a bold attack and initially broke the enemy front. However, due to confusion and false reports that Saif had betrayed him Ibrahim Adil Shah I fled the battlefield. Saif fought his way out with heavy losses, but when he later sought help Ibrahim angrily refused, accused him of disobedience and harshly rejected his loyal service.

When Saif Ain-ul-Mulk saw that the king would not support him he went to his own lands and collected taxes to pay his soldiers. The forces sent by Ibrahim Adil Shah I to stop him were defeated twice which greatly increased Saif's strength and confidence. With growing wealth and army, he began to act like an independent ruler. Ibrahim Adil Shah I finally marched against him in person but Saif used clever tactics and struck at the right moment. In the battle Saif attacked the center of the royal army caused confusion and forced the king to flee. Saif won a victory captured the royal camp, elephants, and artillery, and then marched toward Bijapur. Panic spread in the city as Saif attacked its outskirts and tried to cut off supplies.

==== Battle of Bijapur ====
To defeat Saif Ain-ul-Mulk, Ibrahim Adil Shah I sought help from Rama Raya and sent him a huge gift of gold. Rama Raya responded by sending his brother Venkatadri with an army. Saif tried to attack Venkatadri's camp at night by surprise but the plan failed. Venkatadri was already prepared and ordered his soldiers to light oil-soaked torches which exposed the attackers in the darkness. In the sudden counterattack, many of Saif's men were killed and he narrowly escaped with Salabat Khan. Rumors of his death caused panic and his army scattered before morning. When Saif returned and found his camp deserted he fled toward Ahmadnagar territory hoping for protection but he was betrayed and killed bringing his rebellion to an end.

=== Ahmednagar Invasion of Bijapur (1557-1558) ===
When news of Hussain Nizam Shah I’s victories and his powerful army spread Ibrahim Quli Qutb Shah Wali of Golconda chose to join hands with him. He sent his trusted diplomat Mustafa Khan to Ahmadnagar where he was warmly received and a treaty was soon agreed upon. The plan was that both rulers would first attack Gulbarga together and once it was captured it would be handed over to Hussain Nizam Shah I. After that, they would jointly move against Bidar which would go to Ibrahim Qutb Shah. To confirm the alliance Qasim Beg from Ahmadnagar returned to Golconda with Mustafa Khan. As decided both kings marched from their capitals met near Gulbarga and together surrounded the fort.

==== Second Siege of Gulbarga (1558) ====
The Gulbarga Fort was very strong and difficult to attack with a deep water-filled ditch and walls that even cannon fire could not easily damage. Hussain Nizam Shah I laid siege to the fort and ordered his commanders and artillery leaders to press the attack, and for many weeks both sides fought with great determination. After heavy fighting, the walls were finally breached and a fierce battle followed in which many important commanders were killed but the defenders still held out. When the situation became desperate, the garrison appealed to Ibrahim Adil Shah I who in turn asked Rama Raya for help. Rama Raya's intervention caused Ibrahim Quli Qutb Shah Wali to secretly abandon his alliance with Hussain Nizam Shah I and withdraw from Gulbarga. Enraged by this betrayal Hussain punished Qasim Beg and made changes in his court, but realizing that continuing the siege was no longer practical he finally lifted it and returned to Ahmadnagar.

=== Vijayanagara Invasion of Ahmednagar (1558-1559) ===
Hussain Nizam Shah I did not respect the treaties he had made with his neighbours and took advantage of the young age of Ali Adil Shah I by invading Bijapur. Unable to resist the attack Ali Adil Shah I fled to Vijayanagar and sought refuge with Rama Raya asking for his help. As a signer of the Four Kings peace, Rama Raya felt it was his duty to protect Ali Adil Shah I and defend the agreement. He therefore marched north with his army with Ali Adil Shah I accompanying him. At the same time Rama Raya sent messages to Ibrahim Quli Qutb Shah Wali urging him to join the campaign as another signatory of the treaty. Though Ibrahim Qutb Shah secretly sympathised with Hussain Nizam Shah I and was unwilling to fight him he joined the alliance with his army, fearing the consequences of refusing Rama Raya’s call.

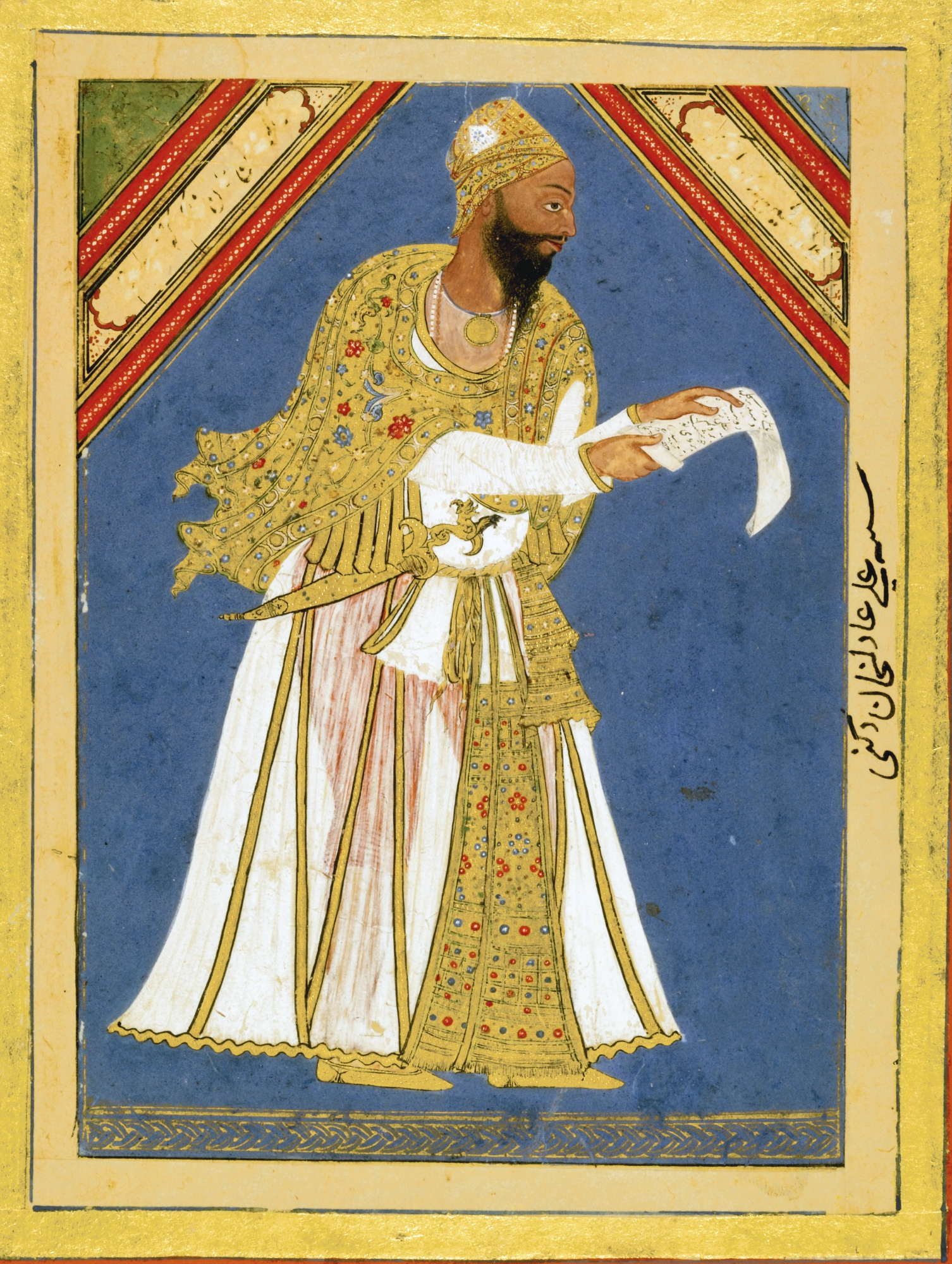
Ali Adil Shah I

==== Second Siege of Ahmednagar and Capture of Kalyani (1558) ====
When the allied armies advanced, Hussain Nizam Shah I quickly withdrew into his own territory and left the defence of Kalyani to Bhopal Ray a trusted Hindu officer. Feeling unsafe even in his capital he placed it under a strong garrison and moved to Paithan on the Godavari. The allies sent part of their army to continue the siege of Kalyani and marched with the rest to Ahmadnagar which they closely surrounded for nearly two months. Although Ibrahim Quli Qutb Shah secretly tried to help the garrison, the fall of the fort seemed certain. To hasten the end of the war, Rama Raya ordered his general Sadasiva Nayaka to raid the countryside up to the Godavari. During this campaign Sadasiva Nayaka fought Nizam Shahi forces at Jamkhed where a fierce battle took place. While some sources disagree about the result there is strong reason to believe that Sadasiva Nayaka gained the upper hand. Soon after, Hussain Nizam Shah I made peace with Rama Raya especially after learning that Bhopal Ray had surrendered the fort of Kalyani to the allies.

==== Battle of Godavari and Capture of Daulatabad ====
The Vijayanagara Army crossed the Godavari and carried out heavy attacks as far as Daulatabad causing great damage along the way. During this campaign, Venkatadri defeated Hussain Nizam Shah I in battle and forced him to retreat in haste crossing the Godavari by boat to escape. Venkatadri closely pursued him and soon captured Daulatabad Fort. These repeated defeats finally convinced Hussain Nizam Shah I that continuing the war was useless. To secure peace and end further losses he agreed to surrender the important fort of Kalyani to Ali Adil Shah I.

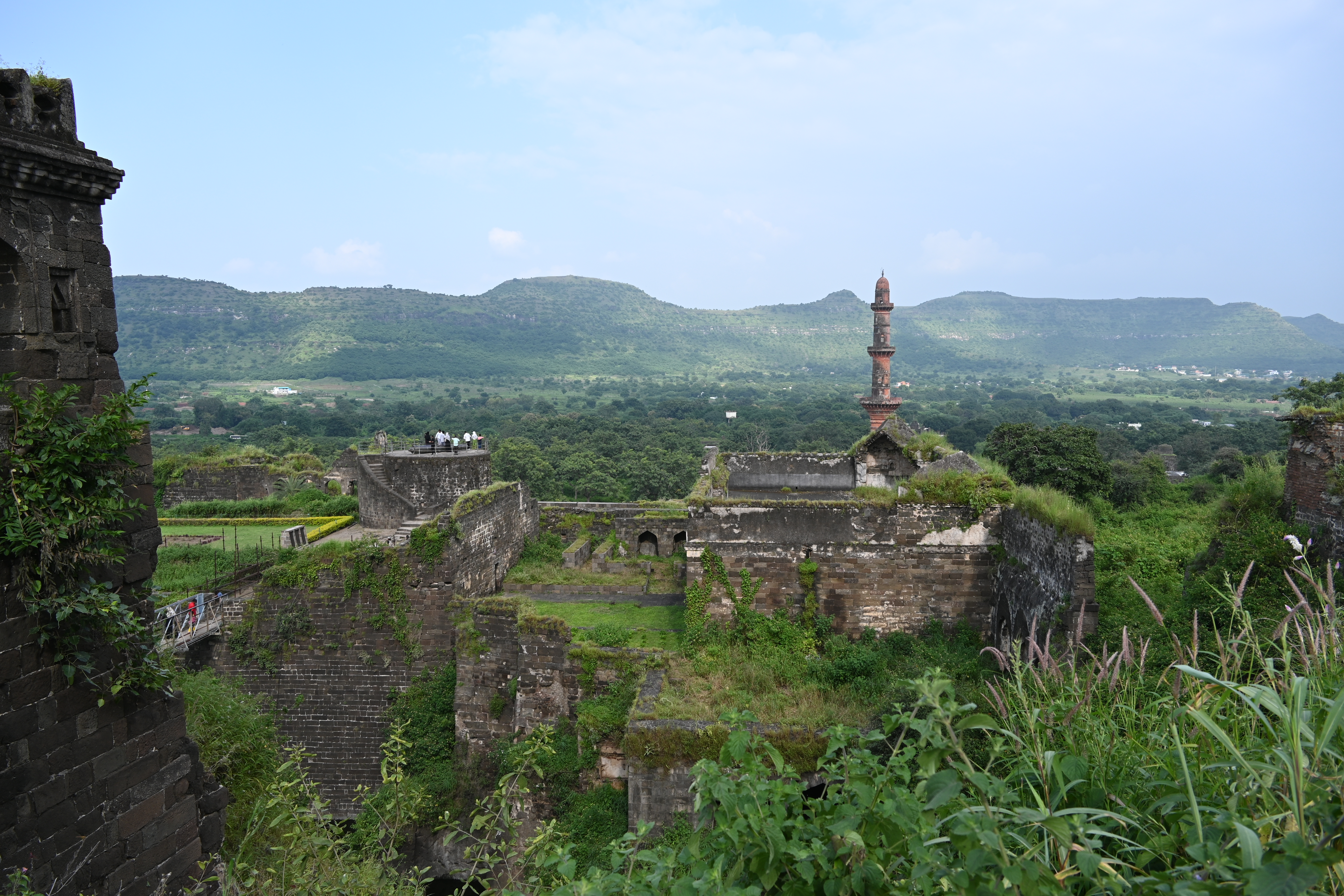
Daulatabad Fort

=== Second Vijaynagara Invasion of Ahmednagar (1561-1562) ===
==== Third Siege of Ahmednagar (1562) ====
After peace in 1559, conflict rose again in 1562 when Hussain Nizam Shah I formed a close alliance with Ibrahim Qutb Shah Wali sealed by the marriage of his daughter Bibi Jamal at Kalyani. Soon after the celebrations both rulers laid siege to Kalyani which forced Ali Adil Shah to seek help from Rama Raya of Vijayanagar. Rama Raya responded strongly sending Venkatadri ahead with a large force and later marching himself with an even bigger army joined by the forces of Bijapur, Bidar, and Berar. Alarmed by this powerful alliance, Hussain and Ibrahim abandoned the siege and retreated, though they were pursued and suffered losses along the way. The allies then besieged Ahmadnagar but continuous resistance, supply problems, heavy monsoon floods, and severe losses weakened their position. Rama Raya finally lifted the siege and withdrew south, while Ali Adil Shah I continued limited fighting with the Hussain Nizam Shah I. Though the campaign caused widespread destruction, it ended without a decisive victory.

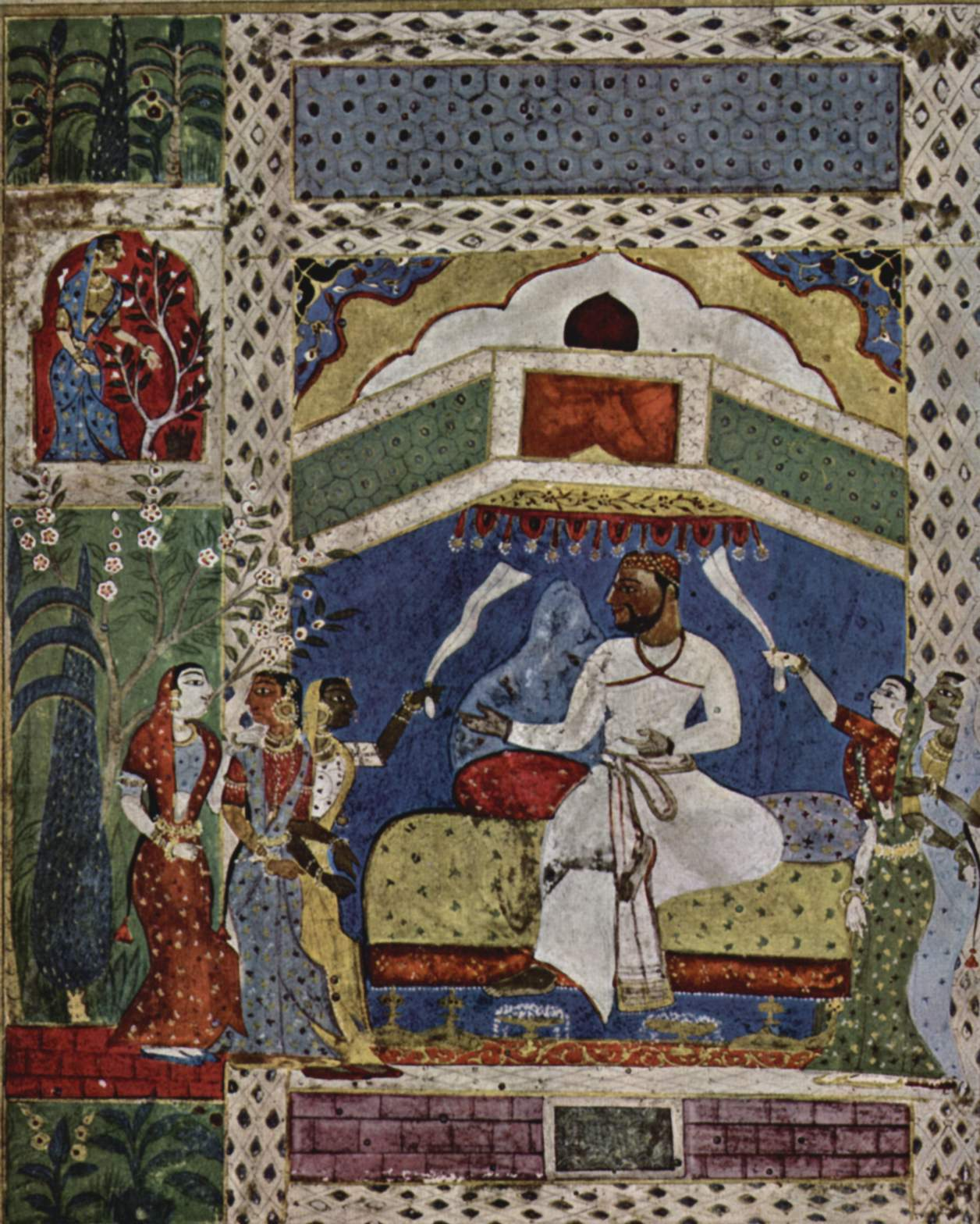
Hussain Nizam Shah I

=== Vijaynagara Invasion of Golconda ===
==== Battle of Tarpully ====
After returning from Ahmadnagar, Rama Raya and his allies camped at Tarpully, about thirty miles from Golconda. Ibrahim Qutb Shah tried to drive them away but failed, as the allied army was far stronger. Rama Raya pressed his advantage and did not allow Ibrahim Quli Qutb Shah Wali time to recover or reorganize his forces. He ordered Venkatadri along with Jagadeva Rao and Ain-ul-Mulk to raid the areas around the Golconda capital and cause widespread damage. At the same time, he sent his nephew Siddhiraju Timmaraju, the governor of Kondavidu, with fifty thousand infantry to attack Kondapalli and Masulipatnam. He also encouraged Sitapati (Cittapa Khan) and Vidiadri to march from Rajahmundry and strike Ellore.

==== Battle of Korkul ====
While Rama Raya stayed with the main army and plundered the areas around the enemy's capital Ibrahim Qutb Shah Wali sent Muzahid Khan to face Venkatadri. The two forces met near Korkul where fighting continued for several days. the battle ended without a decisive victory for either army.

Jagadeva Rao persuaded the local chiefs of Pangal, Rovilkonda, and Ghanpur to surrender their forts to Rama Raya, and Kasi Rao also handed over the keys of Indrakonda. Soon after, Rama Raya’s allies began attacking the southern regions of Golconda from many directions. The Raja of Kandbir moved against Kondapalli, while Shitab Khan and Vidiadri advanced from Rajahmundry and attacked Eluru. At the same time, Chinnapa Naidu of Venkatagiri, with his sons Nayanappa and Timma, captured the fort of Gandikota. Surrounded by enemies and confined to his capital, the Sultan of Golconda prepared to fight at Tarpalli. At this moment, Ali Barid Shah I proposed peace and asked Ibrahim Qutb Shah Wali to send his minister Mustafa Khan for talks. Acting secretly, Mustafa Khan won the support of Jagadeva Rao and with his help met Ali Adil Shah I before approaching Rama Raya. After negotiations Rama Raya reluctantly agreed to withdraw, but only on the condition that he retained the forts of Ghanpur and Pangal. This was accepted, the alliance broke up, and each ruler returned to his own kingdom.

=== Talikota Campaign ===
==== Formation of Shahi League ====
Ali Adil Shah I sent Kishwar Khan Lari to the court of the Ibrahim Quli Qutb Shah Wali to quietly discuss a new plan and take steps to carry it out if possible. Ibrahim Qutb Shah Wali still angry over Rama Raya's arrogance and his seizure of Golconda lands in the recent war readily agreed. The main difficulty was the old rivalry between Ahmadnagar Sultanate and Bijapur Sultanate which could only be solved through marriage ties. For this reason, Ibrahim sent his minister Mustafa Khan first to Bijapur and then to Ahmadnagar. Mustafa convinced Hussain Nizam Shah I that unity among the Muslim rulers once strong under the Bahmanis was necessary to check Vijayanagar's power. His efforts succeeded, and marriage alliances were arranged between the two houses with Sholapur given as dowry. Political treaties were then sworn, and Golconda Sultanate and Bidar Sultanate also joined the league. It was agreed that all would meet at Sholapur and march together against Rama Raya, while Ali Adil Shah sent an envoy to Vijayanagar demanding the return of Yadagiri, Bagalkot, Raichur, and Mudgal as a pretext to break the old alliance.

==== Battle ====
When Rama Raya learned about the alliance formed against him he showed no fear and remained proud and confident. He treated the hostility of the Shahi rulers as unimportant and even dismissed their ambassadors from his court with insult. This act led the allied kings to openly prepare for war and gather their armies at Sholapur. In response, Rama Raya sent his brother Erra Timma Raja with a huge force to guard the crossings of the Krishna River and his brother Venkatadri followed with another army for support. He also ordered all his governors and vassals to rush to the capital with men, money, and supplies. Soldiers from every region and community poured in, and the wealth of many ports and cities was used to equip them. Though already in his eighties, Rama Raya finally marched towards the frontier with a massive army.

On 26 December 1564, the Deccan Sultans met at Sholapur in the plains of Bijapur and later marched towards Talikota where Ali Adil Shah I received his allies with great splendour. Although no battle was fought there the place became famous because of this gathering. When the allied armies reached the Krishna River they found all the ferries and fords guarded by the Vijayanagara forces, who had also built strong field defences with cannon. After careful search the Sultans realised that only one crossing was possible. To mislead the enemy, they pretended for three days to move elsewhere, which made the Vijayanagara troops abandon their posts. Taking advantage of this the Sultans crossed the river without resistance and advanced rapidly to the Hoodery River. Though taken by surprise Rama Raya remained confident, rejected peace offers from the Sultans, and marched forward with a huge army to face them in battle.

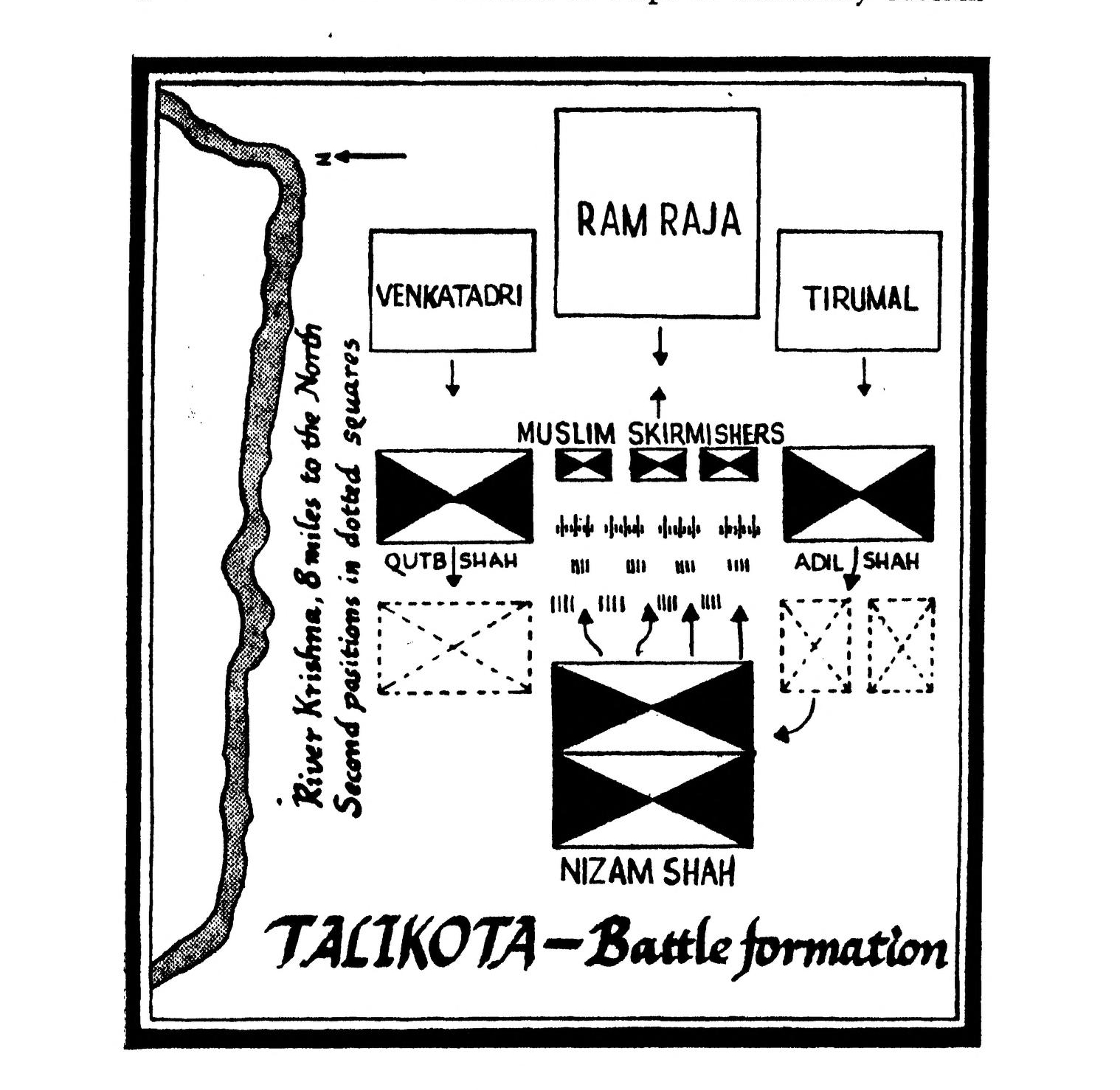
Talikota Battle formation

On the morning of 2 January 1565, the armies of Vijayanagara Empire and the Deccan Sultanates faced each other in full strength. Rama Raya arranged his vast army carefully placing his brothers Venkatadri and Erra Timmaraja on the left and right wings, while he himself led the centre with great confidence. The Deccan forces, though smaller, were well organised and relied heavily on powerful artillery under the command of the skilled officer Rumi Khan. When the battle began the Vijayanagara army opened the attack with rockets and cannon fire but the Deccan gunners replied with deadly effect, causing heavy losses. Encouraged by Rama Raya’s rewards and generosity, the Hindu troops fought fiercely and at first threw the enemy wings into confusion. However, the steady advance of Hussain Nizam Shah I in the centre and the devastating fire of the artillery turned the tide. A sudden cavalry charge broke into Rama Raya’s lines, creating panic. In the confusion, Rama Raya was captured and executed, and Venkatadri was killed in the battle Rama Raya's death quickly spread fear through the Vijayanagara Army. Leaderless the troops fled in disorder and were pursued with great slaughter. The defeat was complete, leading to immense plunder for the victors and the eventual sack of the great capital of Vijayanagara.

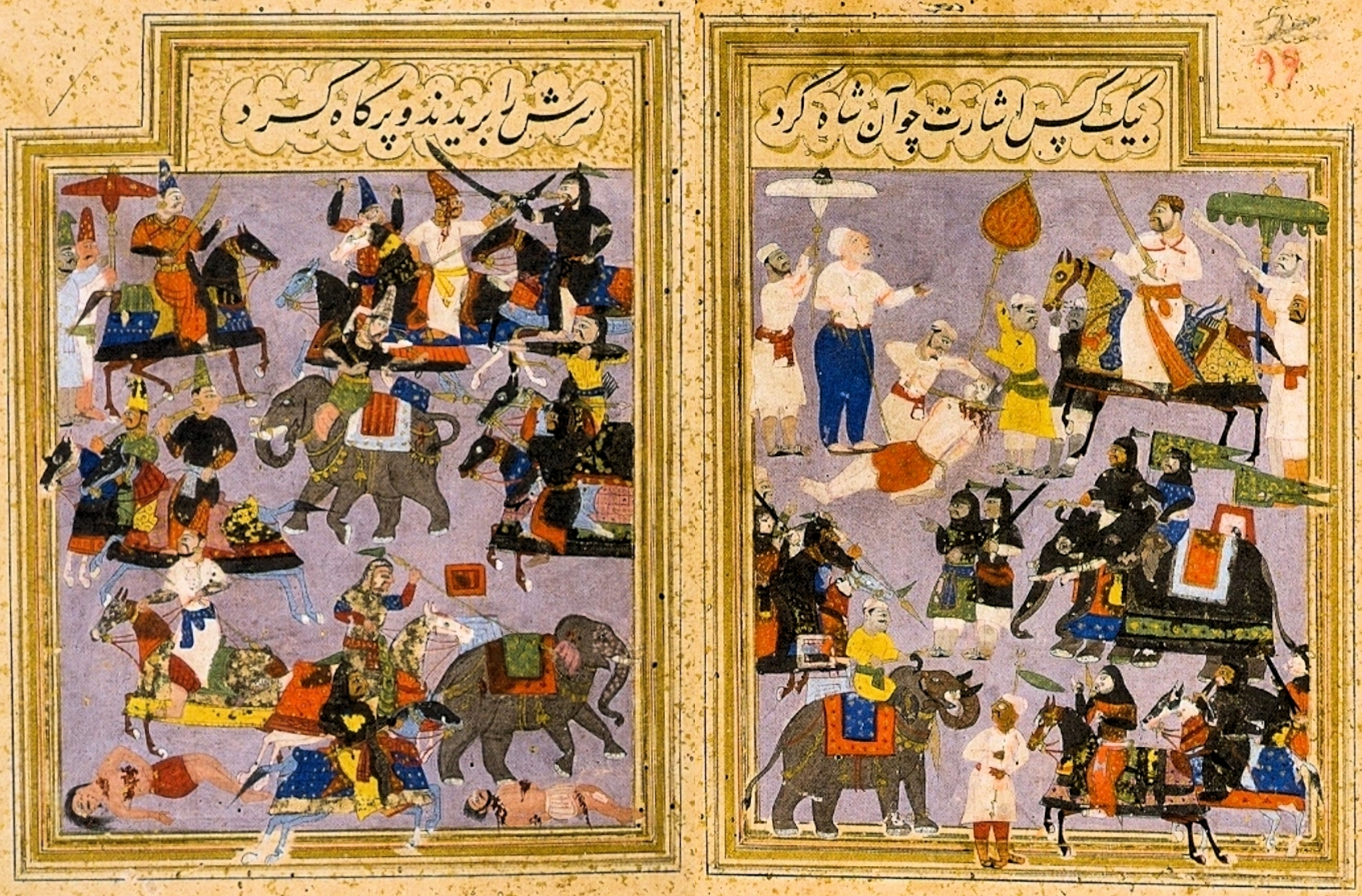
Battle of Talikota (formatted)

== Administration ==
The Ramarajiyamu states that Venkatadri ruled from the town of Kandanol in the present Kurnool district. In 1547, he showed generosity by remitting taxes for the Brahmins living in the villages of Kanala, Damagatla, and Bannum, all of which were also in the Kurnool region. This period appears to belong to the early stage of Rama Raya’s administration. Later records suggest that Venkatadri was transferred and placed in charge of the Chola country during the second phase of his governorship.

== Family ==
Venkatadri had two wives, Rangamma and Krishnamma. Through these marriages he had two sons named Rangappa and Rama Raja III.

== See also ==
- Aravidu Rama Raja I
- Aravidu Dynasty
- Vijayanagara Empire
