= Battle of Kalyani (1543) =

Battle between the Vijayanagara Empire and Deccan Sultanates

First Battle of Kalyani
- Part of Deccani–Vijayanagar wars
Date	1543
Location	Basavakalyan, India
Result	Vijayanagar victory

Belligerents
Vijayanagar Empire	Deccan Sultanates: Ahmednagar Sultanate; Golconda Sultanate; Bidar Sultanate

Commanders and leaders
Rama Raya; Tirumala Deva Raya; Hande Hanumappa Nayaka; Venkatadri	Jamsheed Quli Qutub Shah; Burhan Nizam Shah I (POW); Ali Barid Shah I

The First Battle of Kalyani was a confrontation between the Vijayanagara Empire led by the regent Rama Raya and the combined forces of the Sultanates of Ahmadnagar, Golconda, and Bidar. led by Burhan Nizam Shah I, Jamsheed Quli Qutub Shah and Ali Barid Shah I The Vijayanagar army inflicted a defeat on the combined Sultanates forces forcing the three Sultans to flee the battlefield.

== Background ==
After returning to Bijapur, Ibrahim Adil Shah I formed an alliance with Burhan Nizam Shah I of Ahmadnagar against Bidar and Vijayanagara. As part of their agreement, the Sultan of Ahmadnagar would target Ali Barid Shah I of Bidar, while Bijapur would focus on advancing into Vijayanagara's territory without interference. Burhan Nizam Shah stormed and captured the fort of Kandhar. Meanwhile, Amir Barid Shah, unaware of the secret alliance, sought refuge with Ibrahim Adil Shah I he was instead captured by his former ally.. Following this, Ibrahim Adil Shah marched south capturing various territories from Vijayanagara Empire. However, historical evidence casts doubt on these claims of conquests, as there are no records of territorial losses for Vijayanagara during this period. Additionally, Rama Raya was later engaged in a conflict with Ahmadnagar suggesting that Vijayanagara’s power remained intact.

== Battle ==
Rama Raya realized that the actual cause of the conflict with Bijapur was probably Burhan Nizam Shah I of Ahmadnagar. Rama Raya decided to concentrate on breaking the alliance between the two Sultanates instead of striking back at Bijapur. he decided to confront Ahmadnagar directly. Resolved to create discord between the allies, Rama Raya gathered his troops and advanced against Burhan Nizam Shah I.

To reach the territories of Ahmadnagar Rama Raya had to cross the regions controlled by Golkonda and Bidar. Requiring a well organized approach to overcome possible opposition. To ensure the success of his campaign, he divided his army into three sections. Rama Raya himself led the contingent to confront the Sultan of Golkonda while his brother Tirumala commanded the forces dispatched against the Sultan of Bidar. The third army under the leadership of Hande Hanumappa Nayudu of Sonnalapuram, was sent directly against Ahmadnagar.

The events of this campaign are mentioned in Hindu poems which recount the capture of the city of Kaliyani, a battle between the Vijayanagar and Allied Sultans Army and the subsequent sack of Ahmadnagar. While the Vasucharitramu omits details about Kaliyani’s fall, the Annals of Hande Anantapuram provide a clear account of the battle. The Vijayanagar army, having reunited its three armies, faced the combined forces of the Sultans of Ahmadnagar, Golkonda, and Bidar. In the ensuing battle the allied Sultan armies suffered a defeat. The three Sultans, witnessing the collapse of their forces, fled the battlefield. The victorious Vijayanagar army pursued them during which Hande Hanumappa Nayaka captured Burhan Nizam Shah I.

== Aftermath ==
Following his capture by Hande Hanumappa Nayaka during the war, Burhan Nizam Shah I found himself in the hands of Rama Raya. The Regent of Vijayanagara seizing the opportunity Forced Burhan Nizam Shah to abandon his alliance with Ibrahim Adil Shah I of Bijapur. This was Rama Raya's primary objective aimed at weakening the alliance between the Bijapur and Ahmednagar Sultanates. Once Burhan Nizam Shah agreed to the terms and severed ties with Bijapur Rama Raya released him immediately.

== See also ==
- Ali Barid Shah I
- Burhan Nizam Shah I
- Jamsheed Quli Qutub Shah
