= Vijaynagara invasion of Bijapur (1552) =

Vijaynagar invasion of Bijapur (1552)
- Part of Deccani–Vijayanagar Wars
Date	1552
Location	Bijapur, India
Result	Vijaynagara-Ahmadnagar victory
Territorial changes	Rama Raya captured Raichur and Mudgal; Burhan Nizam Shah I captured Sholapur

Belligerents
Vijayanagar Empire; Ahmednagar Sultanate	Bijapur Sultanate

Commanders and leaders
Rama Raya; Venkatadri; Burhan Nizam Shah I	Ibrahim Adil Shah I

Vijaynagar invasion of Bijapur (1552) was a campaign initiated by Vijayanagar and Ahmednagar Sultanate against Bijapur Sultanate After losing Kalyani in a previous conflict, Ibrahim Adil Shah I of Bijapur sought to reclaim the Kalyani In response to his ambitions Burhan Nizam Shah I of Ahmadnagar and Rama Raya the powerful regent of Vijayanagar, renewed their alliance to counter Bijapur. Their combined forces launched an invasion of the Bijapur Sultanate targeting key fortresses. In this campaign, they successfully captured the strategically significant forts of Raichur, Mudgal, and Sholapur.

== Background ==
Following the successful Vijayanagar-Ahmadnagar campaign against Bijapur, hostilities continued despite the recent victories. By the end of 1552, Ibrahim Adil Shah I of Bijapur began preparations to reclaim the strategically vital fort of Kalyani. In response to this Burhan Nizam Shah I of Ahmadnagar, recognizing the importance of maintaining control over Kalyani, sought the assistance of Rama Raya of Vijayanagar. Ambassadors were dispatched to Vijayanagar, and Rama Raya readily agreed to reinforce their alliance. The two leaders arranged to meet near Raichur to devise a coordinated strategy for the campaign.

== Campaign ==
In response to Bijapur's preparations to retake Kalyani, Rama Raya marched with a substantial force to Raichur where he convened with Burhan Nizam Shah I to finalize their joint strategy. During their meeting, it was agreed that Vijayanagar would focus on capturing the key forts of Raichur and Mudgal strengthening Rama Raya’s influence in the region. In return, Rama Raya pledged to support Burhan Nizam Shah I in his campaign to seize the city of Sholapur and the surrounding areas, as well as the strategic city of Gulbarga.

The allied forces of Vijayanagar and Ahmadnagar successfully captured the fort of Raichur Following this victory the garrison at Mudgal recognizing the futility of resistance, surrendered without opposition. With the strategic forts secured, Rama Raya entrusted his younger brother Venkatadri to lead a contingent of troops in support of Burhan Nizam Shah I’s continued campaign. Confident in the strength of the alliance and the progress made, Rama Raya returned to Vijayanagar leaving Venkatadri to oversee further operations.

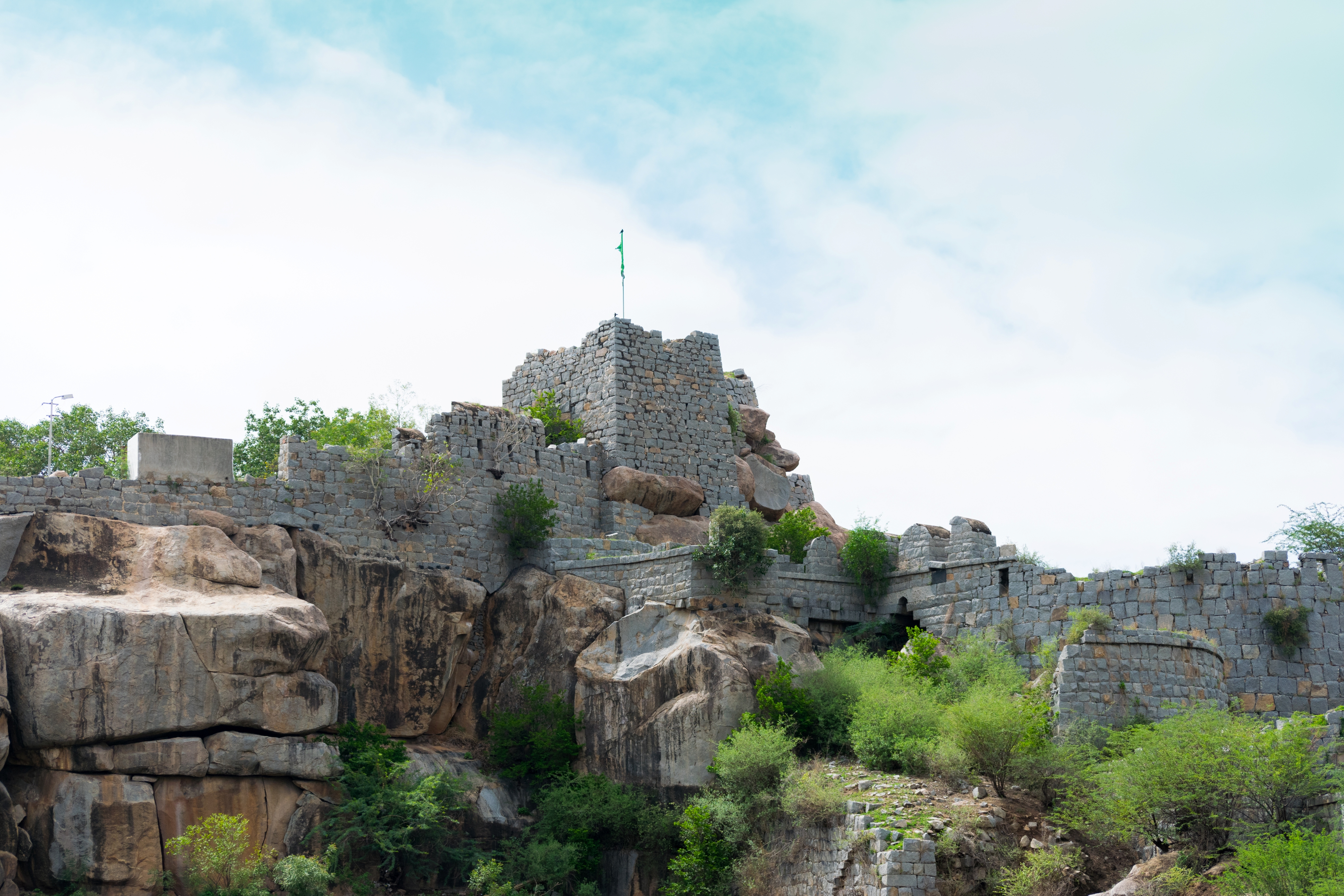
Raichur Fort

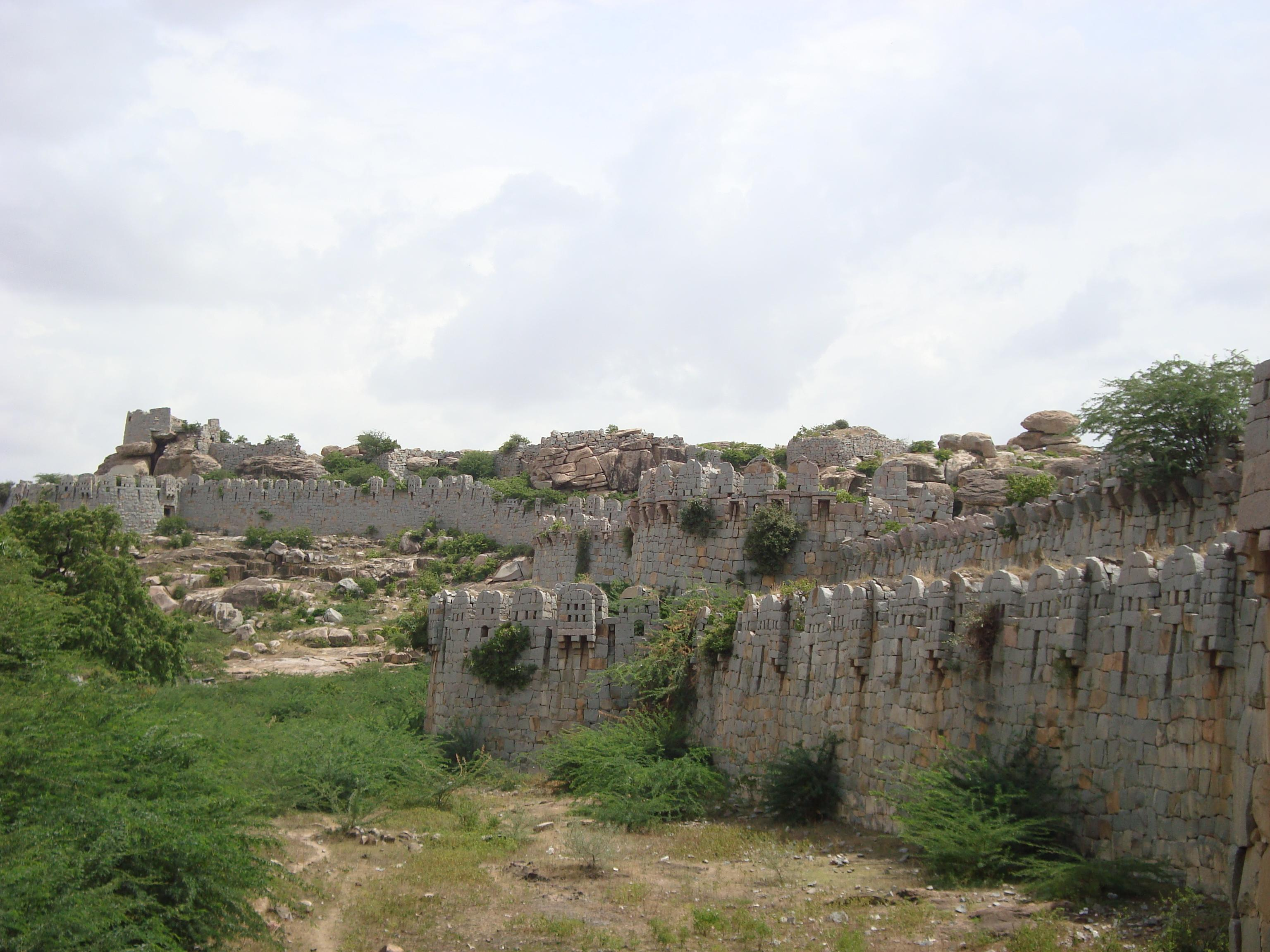
Mudgal fort

With the assistance of Venkatadri, the Sultan of Ahmadnagar successfully captured Sholapur in a short period and fortified the city before returning to his capital. While the history of the Sultans of Bijapur, as recorded by Ferishta does not explain the strategic aim behind the allies' attempt to conquer Gulbarga the history of the Sultans of Ahmadnagar provides a different perspective. According to this account, Burhan Nizam Shah I was unable to capture the city because he was abandoned by his Hindu ally Rama Raya. This departure left Ahmadnagar’s forces unable to maintain their campaign, leading to the failure to seize Gulbarga.

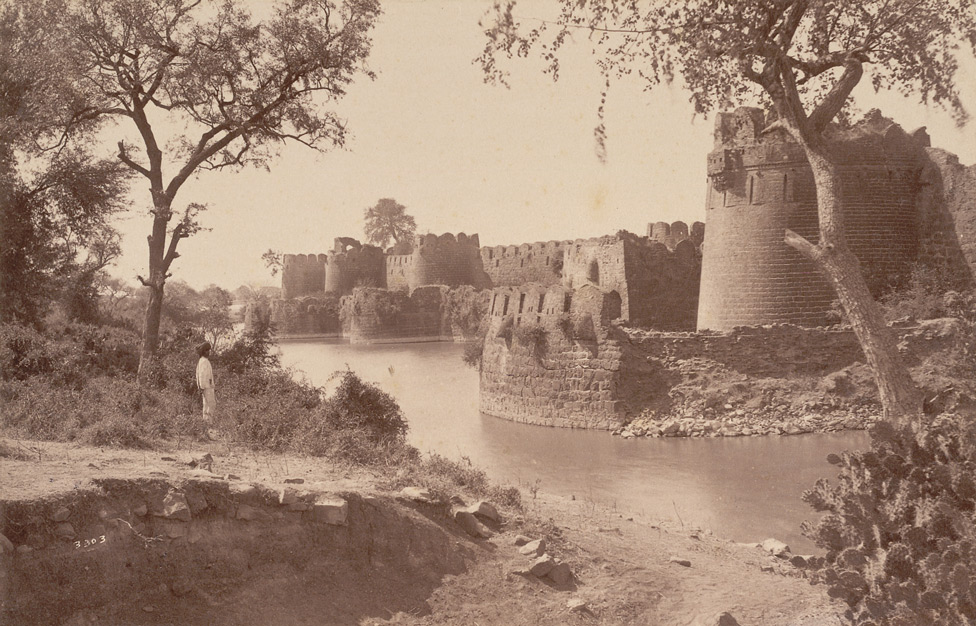
Gulbarga Fort.

A possible misunderstanding may have occurred between Sultan Burhan Nizam Shah I and Venkatadri, which led to the latter leaving for Vijayanagara. Without Venkatadri's crucial support, Nizam Shah's ambitions to conquer Gulbarga remained unfulfilled. Soon after this setback, Nizam Shah died.

== Aftermath ==
After the death of Burhan Nizam Shah I his son Hussain Nizam Shah I ascended the throne of Ahmadnagar. Seeking stability and peace, Hussain initiated talks with Ibrahim Adil Shah I of Bijapur. The two rulers met on their borders in a diplomatic gesture of goodwill. The meeting was marked by cordial discussions, and both kings managed to resolve their differences, leading to a peaceful understanding. They parted ways satisfied with the terms of their agreement, bringing an end to hostilities between their kingdoms, at least for a time being.

== See also ==
- Ahmednagar Sultanate
- Rama Raya
- Vijayanagara Empire
