= Siege of Paranda =

- Part of Deccani–Vijayanagar wars
Date	1549
Location	Paranda, India
Result	Vijayanagar-Ahmednagar victory

Belligerents
Vijayanagar Empire; Ahmednagar Sultanate	Bijapur Sultanate

Commanders and leaders
Rama Raya; Venkatadri; Sadasiva Nayaka; Burhan Nizam Shah I Shaik Jafar; Qasim Beg; Bhopal Rai	Ibrahim Adil Shah I

The siege of Paranda was a confrontation between the forces of Bijapur and the allied armies of Vijayanagar and Ahmadnagar led by Burhan Nizam Shah I. Following his defeat at Kalyani, Ibrahim Adil Shah I of Bijapur seized Paranda and appointed a Deccani governor to hold the fort. Determined to reclaim the stronghold, Burhan Nizam Shah I mobilized his forces and advanced towards Paranda. As the allied army approached, the Bijapuri governor, overwhelmed by fear, abandoned the fort under the cover of night. His troops, demoralized by their leader’s flight, followed suit, allowing Burhan Nizam Shah I to recapture Paranda without resistance.

== Background ==
The Battle of Kalyani (1549) marked a decisive victory for the allied forces of Vijayanagar and Ahmadnagar against the combined armies of Bijapur and Bidar. Initially, Burhan Nizam Shah I laid siege to Sholapur but, on the advice of Rama Raya shifted focus to the strategically vital fort of Kalyani. As the siege intensified, Ibrahim Adil Shah I of Bijapur marched to relieve the fort at the request of Ali Barid Shah I. Despite Ibrahim's efforts, his forces were defeated, forcing him to flee and leaving the garrison at Kalyani isolated. In a desperate attempt to disrupt the siege, Ibrahim deployed Maratha cavalry to cut off the allies' supply lines, causing distress in the besieging camp. However, Burhan Nizam Shah I supported by Sadasiva Nayak and Bhopal Rai, launched a surprise attack on Ibrahim’s camp, scattering his forces and securing the battlefield. The surrender of the Kalyani commandant soon followed, a critical victory for the Ahmadnagar-Vijayanagar alliance.

== Siege ==
Despite his defeat at Kalyani, Ibrahim Adil Shah I of Bijapur remained undeterred and sought to shift the conflict into enemy territory. To divert attention and protect his own domains from further devastation, he launched an invasion into Ahmadnagar territory. Moving rapidly, Ibrahim arrived at the fort of Paranda where he found the gates unguarded and open. Seizing the opportunity, he led his troops in a sudden assault, capturing the fortress without significant resistance. After securing Paranda Ibrahim entrusted its administration to one of his loyal Deccani officers.

Following his capture of Paranda Ibrahim Adil Shah I advanced further into Ahmadnagar territory, launching raids and laying waste to the surrounding districts. His forces plundered villages and towns, exacting heavy tributes and contributions from the local population. However, as Burhan Nizam Shah I mobilized his army and marched to confront him, Ibrahim chose to avoid direct conflict. He ordered a retreat, withdrawing his forces toward Bijapur with spoils from the campaign.

As Burhan Nizam Shah I advanced to reclaim Paranda the Bijapuri governor in charge of the fortress, overwhelmed by fear, abandoned his post under the cover of night. Without informing his troops, he fled, leaving the garrison leaderless. By the following morning, the remaining soldiers, realizing their commander’s escape, also deserted the fort. Three days later, Burhan Nizam Shah I and his forces arrived to find Paranda completely abandoned. Without facing any resistance, he reclaimed the fortress, restoring it to Ahmadnagar’s control.

== Aftermath ==
Upon his return to Bijapur, Ibrahim Adil Shah I enraged by the cowardice and failure of the Deccani governor who had fled from Paranda ordered his execution.

== See also ==
- Burhan Nizam Shah I
- Rama Raya
- Ibrahim Adil Shah I
