= Siege of Ahmednagar (1543) =

Vijaynagara invasion of Ahmednagar Sultanate (1543)

- Part of Deccani–Vijayanagar wars
Date	1543
Location	Ahmednagar, India
Result	Vijayanagar victory

Belligerents
Vijayanagar Empire	Ahmednagar Sultanate

Commanders and leaders
Rama Raya; Tirumala Deva Raya; Venkatadri; Hande Hanumappa Nayaka	Burhan Nizam Shah I

The siege of Ahmadnagar was a conflict between the Vijayanagara Empire led by Rama Raya and the Ahmadnagar Sultanate commanded by Burhan Nizam Shah I. After suffering a defeat in the Battle of Kalyani Burhan Nizam Shah retreated to his capital only to be pursued by the Vijayanagara forces. Rama Raya's army laid siege to Ahmednagar overpowering its defenses and capturing the city. Following their victory, the Vijayanagara forces razed the city's fortifications.

== Background ==
Burhan Nizam Shah I of Ahmadnagar and Ibrahim Adil Shah I of Bijapur formed an alliance to invade Bidar and Vijayanagara simultaneously, but the Vijayanagara forces, led by Sada Siva Nayaka, successfully repelled the Bijapuri assault. Recognizing that Ahmednagar was the main instigator of these attacks, Rama Raya mobilized his army for retaliation. To advance toward Ahmadnagar. he devised a strategy to cross the territories of Bidar and Golconda dividing his forces into three sections. Tirumala Deva Raya attacked Bidar, Rama Raya marched against Golconda and Hande Hanumappa Nayaka advanced towards Ahmadnagar. In response, the three Sultans of Ahmadnagar, Bidar, and Golconda formed an alliance and confronted the combined Vijayanagara forces near Kalyani. In the ensuing battle, the Vijayanagara army achieved a victory, forcing the Sultans to flee. Pursuing Burhan Nizam Shah I Rama Raya's forces laid siege to Ahmadnagar.

== Battle ==
Following their defeat, the city of Ahmadnagar was unable to withstand the siege of Rama Raya's victorious army. Seizing the opportunity, Rama Raya captured the capital of the Nizam Sultans, razed it to the ground, and symbolically sowed castor seeds on its ruins a detail preserved in the Ramarajiyamu. For this feat, the poem bestows upon Rama Raya the title "Destroyer of the Fortifications of Ahmadnagar." With Burhan Nizam Shah I now a prisoner, Rama Raya achieved his primary objective forcing the Sultan to terminate his alliance with Ibrahim Adil Shah I of Bijapur. Satisfied with this outcome, Rama Raya set Burhan Nizam Shah at liberty, having secured a significant political and military victory for Vijayanagara.

== See also ==
- Ahmednagar Sultanate
- Golconda Sultanate
- Vijaynagar Empire
