= Saif Ain-ul-Mulk's Rebellion =

Date	1553–1554
Location	Karnataka, Maharashtra, India
Result	Bijapur-Vijayanagar victory

Belligerents
Bijapur Sultanate; Supported By : Vijayanagara Empire	Rebels

Commanders and leaders
Ibrahim Adil Shah INiyaz Quli Beg; Dilawar Khan Hubshi; Rama Raya; Venkatadri	Saif Ain-ul-Mulk X Salabat Khan X Murtaza Khan Anjoo

Saif Ain-ul-Mulk's Rebellion was a rebellion against sultan of Bijapur Ibrahim Adil Shah I by Saif Ain-ul-Mulk after he was wrongly blamed by Ibrahim Adil Shah and denied help after a battle. Feeling betrayed, he went to his own lands, gathered taxes, and raised an army. When the king sent forces to stop him, Saif defeated them and grew stronger. He even defeated a royal army led by the king himself and captured valuable items, including elephants and weapons. Saif then tried to take Bijapur but was stopped when Rama Raya of Vijayanagar sent his brother Venkatadri with a large army. Saif's surprise attack failed, and his army was defeated. He fled to Hussain Nizam Shah I’s territory but was later Assassinated.

== Background ==
=== Cause of The Rebellion ===
In 1552, Burhan Nizam Shah I with help from Rama Raya the king of Vijayanagar, captured and strengthened the fort of Sholapur. Later, even though peace was made between Hussain Nizam Shah I (Burhan's son) and Ibrahim Adil Shah I of Bijapur, trouble began again. Khwaja Jahan, the chief of Paranda who had fled from Husain's rule, went to Bijapur and encouraged Ibrahim Adil Shah I to try and take back Sholapur. To do this, Ibrahim made a treaty with Rama Raya and invited Saif Ain-ul-Mulk, the former commander-in-chief under Burhan Nizam Shah I to join his service. Saif, who had taken shelter in Berar to escape Hussain's cruelty, agreed. Ibrahim welcomed him with rich gifts, land, and high titles. Following Saif's advice, Ibrahim then supported Prince Ali, Burhan Nizam Shah I’s son, who had also taken refuge in Bijapur.

It was decided that if Prince Ali Nizam Shah became the ruler of Ahmadnagar, he would give the forts of Kalyani and Sholapur to Ibrahim Adil Shah of Bijapur. To achieve this, Prince Ali, along with 2000 horsemen who had come with him from Ahmadnagar went to the border area to try and win the support of the local nobles. However, he was not very successful. In response, Hussain Nizam Shah I quickly gathered his army. At the same time, Ibrahim Adil Shah I gave large rewards to his soldiers and marched from Bijapur to help Prince Ali. Both armies finally met on the plains of Sholapur.

Ibrahim Adil Shah I arranged his army carefully for the battle. He gave the right wing to Saif Ain-ul-Mulk Gilani and Ankush Khan, and the left wing to Nur Khan and Imadul-Mulk. He himself stayed in the center with his royal troops. Saif Ain-ul-Mulk also led the front troops and began the attack by moving ahead of the main army. Ibrahim Adil Shah I was not happy that Saif had moved too far from the main group and ordered him to stay closer. Saif replied that the king was right, but since he had already advanced, turning back would give the enemy an advantage. So, he continued forward, captured and destroyed the enemy's cannons, and pushed their front guards back toward their main army.

Saif Ain-ul-Mulk was soon met by Hussain Nizam Shah I himself, who led his army with great courage. Although the Nizam Shahi army started to fall back and could have been defeated, Saif did not receive any support. Meanwhile, some Nizam Shahi commanders from the left wing came to help their king and almost surrounded Saif Ain-ul-Mulk, causing chaos in his division. In the middle of this, Saif saw Ibrahim Adil Shah I’s royal flags in the distance. As he always did in tough situations, he got off his horse, ready to fight to the death. However, some soldiers who saw this misunderstood his actions. They told Ibrahim Adil Shah I that Saif had betrayed him and was showing respect to Hussain Nizam Shah I . Believing this, Ibrahim thought Saif had switched sides and, in fear, fled the battlefield. He did not stop riding until he reached Bijapur.

After learning that the king had fled, Saif Ain-ul-Mulk bravely fought his way through the enemy, suffering heavy losses. When he reached the capital, he respectfully sent a message to Ibrahim Adil Shah I explaining that he had lost all his belongings, had no tents or shelter, and needed money to recover and appear at court properly. However, the king, still angry and blaming Saif for disobeying his earlier orders, refused to help. He said he did not want such stubborn and disobedient servants and told Saif to take care of himself elsewhere. Saif sent another message, saying he had risked his life for the king and lost 500 of his loyal friends and family in battle. He explained that he had nowhere else to go, as he had left his safe place only to serve the king. But the king felt insulted by Saif's words and, in anger, ordered that the messenger be beaten and thrown out of his presence.

== Rebellion ==
=== First Bijapur Defeat ===
Saif Ain-ul-Mulk, seeing that the king would not help him, asked his friends for advice. They suggested that he go to his own lands (jagirs) and collect taxes from the autumn harvest, which was ready. After that, if the king tried to remove him by force, he could escape to a safer place. Saif followed this advice and left Bijapur for Man-Dese, where he gathered the revenue and shared it with his soldiers. In response, Ibrahim Adil Shah I sent an officer with 5,000 horsemen to drive him out. But Saif's forces defeated them, and feeling stronger after this victory, he started collecting taxes from more areas like Walwa, Miraj, and other nearby districts.

=== Second Bijapur Defeat ===
Ibrahim Adil Shah I then sent a larger force of 10,000 soldiers, both horsemen and foot soldiers, under the command of Niyaz Quli Beg and Dilwar Khan Hubshi to fight Saif Ain-ul-Mulk. But this army was also defeated by Saif. He captured many elephants, horses, and a large amount of valuable supplies and baggage. With so much wealth and growing power, Saif Ain-ul-Mulk began to seriously consider making himself an independent ruler. To prepare for this, he started gathering even more troops to strengthen his position.

=== Third Bijapur Defeat ===
Finally, Ibrahim Adil Shah I decided to take action himself and marched with an army of 5,000 elite horsemen, 3,000 foot soldiers, and a strong artillery force. Saif Ain-ul-Mulk set up his camp near the Manjira River, while the king camped on the opposite side and waited for several days without attacking. Saif did not want to retreat and was determined to fight before leaving the area. For three days in a row, he moved his army forward as if to start a battle, but each time returned without fighting. This kept the king's army on alert from morning to evening. On the fourth day, Saif again moved his troops, but the king, thinking it was just another false move, did not prepare for battle. Only the camp's regular guards got ready. But when Saif's army came close and his flags appeared, Ibrahim Adil Shah I quickly organized his troops and rushed out of the camp to face him in battle.

Saif Ain-ul-Mulk was unsure about fighting directly against the king and asked his advisors for their opinion. He said it might be wrong, even treason, to attack the royal flag. All agreed with him except Murtaza Khan Anjoo, who said that flags do not fight and there was no risk of hurting the king himself. Saif accepted this reasoning, and since it was too late to turn back, he charged into battle. He attacked the center of the king's army, where Ibrahim Adil Shah I was stationed, with great force. The royal troops were quickly thrown into confusion, and the king fled. His whole army broke apart, and Saif Ain-ul-Mulk won the battle. He captured the royal canopy, elephants, artillery, and all the tents and supplies. Ibrahim Adil Shah I shut himself inside the Bijapur citadel, and panic spread in the city. Many people believed the royal family would soon fall. Saif Ain-ul-Mulk took advantage of his victory and marched to Bijapur where he attacked different parts of the city for several days and tried to block its supply routes.

=== Siege of Bijapur ===
Ibrahim Adil Shah I asked for help from the Vijayanagara ruler Rama Raya. He sent him a large gift of 1,200,000 hoons (gold coins), and in return, Rama Raya sent his brother Venkatadri with a strong army to drive out Saif Ain-ul-Mulk. Saif tried to surprise Venkatadri's camp, just like Asad Khan had done in the past. But Venkatadri found out about his plan and prepared his soldiers. He gave them long wooden sticks with cloth soaked in oil tied to one end. He told them that when the enemy attacked, they should light the cloths and hold them high, so the light would help everyone clearly see the attackers.

One night, Saif Ain-ul-Mulk chose 2,000 soldiers and, along with Salabat Khan, secretly marched to attack Venkatadri's camp. They entered the camp without resistance, but as soon as a planned signal was given, Venkatadri's soldiers lit their torches and attacked. Venkatadri had been fully prepared, and in the surprise counterattack, over 500 of Ain-ul-Mulk's men were killed before they could escape. Ain-ul-Mulk and Salabat Khan barely managed to flee but got lost in the dark. When some survivors returned and said Ain-ul-Mulk was dead, panic spread among his remaining troops. Fearing the worst, the soldiers ran away in different directions during the night. At dawn, Ain-ul-Mulk and Salabat Khan returned with just 200 horsemen, but seeing the camp abandoned, they fled towards Man-Dese and into the territory of Hussain Nizam Shah I hoping for safety. they were betrayed and killed.

== See also ==
- Vijayanagara Empire
- Bijapur Sultanate
- Ahmednagar Sultanate
