= Battle of Kalyani (1549) =

Conflict during the Vijayanagar wars in India

Second Battle of Kalyani (1549)
- Part of Deccani–Vijayanagar wars
Date	1549
Location	Basavakalyan, India
Result	Vijayanagar–Ahmednagar victory

Belligerents
Vijayanagar Empire; Ahmednagar Sultanate	Bijapur Sultanate; Bidar Sultanate

Commanders and leaders
Rama Raya; Venkatadri; Sadasiva Nayaka; Burhan Nizam Shah I Shaik Jafar; Qasim Beg; Bhopal Rai	Ibrahim Adil Shah I (surrendered); Rai Chaitpal (executed); Ali Barid Shah I

The Battle of Kalyani (1549) was a conflict fought between the allied forces of Vijayanagar and Ahmednagar against the sultanates of Bidar and Bijapur. As the combined armies of Vijayanagar and Ahmednagar laid siege to the fort of Kalyani, the Sultan of Bidar Ali Barid Shah I sought assistance from Ibrahim Adil Shah I of Bijapur. In response, Ibrahim marched to relieve the fort and confront the besieging forces. However, the Bijapuri forces were defeated by the allied army in a surprise attack. Following this victory, the fort of Kalyani surrendered.

== Background ==
Following the failure of his schemes during Abdulla's rebellion, Burhan Nizam Shah I sought to strengthen his position by forming an alliance with Rama Raya of Vijayanagar. After the death of Asad Khan Burhan sent ambassadors bearing gifts to Rama Raya proposing a confederacy. In response Rama Raya reciprocated with gifts and assurances of friendship. However Ibrahim Adil Shah I of Bijapur alarmed by this developing alliance openly insulted the Vijayanagar ambassadors residing at his court. Their treatment was so severe that they abandoned Bijapur in anger reporting to Rama Raya that they feared for their lives had they remained any longer.

Outraged by the disrespect shown to his ambassadors at Bijapur, Rama Raya urged Burhan Nizam Shah to take action against Ali Barid Shah I, who had aligned himself with Ibrahim Adil Shah I. Rama Raya advised Burhan that it was an opportune moment to seize Kalyani from Ali Barid. In line with their newly formed alliance, Vijayanagar forces supported Burhan's campaign by participating in the siege of Kalyani.

== Battle ==
Burhan Nizam Shah I began his campaign by laying siege to Sholapur but, acting on the advice of Rama Raya, he shifted his focus to the strategically important fort of Kalyani. The joint forces of Ahmadnagar and Vijayanagar marched on Kalyani, pressing the siege with determination. In response to the siege of Kalyani by Burhan Nizam Shah, Ibrahim Adil Shah, at the urgent request of his ally Ali Barid Shah I mobilized his forces and marched to relieve the besieged fort. When Ibrahim Adil Shah I of Bijapur attempted to relieve the fort, the allied armies defeated him, forcing him to flee the battlefield. With Ibrahim's forces in disarray, the allies successfully cut off all communications between the garrison at Kalyani and the outside world, eventually pushing the defenders to the brink of starvation.

Determined to relieve the besieged garrison at Kalyani, Ibrahim Adil Shah I once again marched with his forces and set up camp within sight of the allied armies. Burhan Nizam Shah I resolute in his desire to capture the fort, fortified his siege lines and pressed on with the attack. In response, Ibrahim deployed his light Maratha cavalry to disrupt the besiegers, launching swift raids that cut off the allies' supply lines. As the harassment continued, scarcity of food and resources began to take its toll, causing distress and weakening the resolve of the besieging army.

As the siege of Kalyani dragged on and supplies dwindled, Burhan Nizam Shah I convened a council of war to decide the next course of action. While some nobles advocated for lifting the siege and retreating to Ahmadnagar others, including Shaikh Jafar and Qasim Beg proposed a surprise attack on Ibrahim Adil Shah I's forces. This plan was supported by Vijayanagar commander Sadasiva Nayak and Bhopal Rai, emboldened by earlier victories over the Bijapuri troops. Acting on this strategy, Saifuddin Ain-ul-Mulk led a sudden assault on the Bijapur camp, catching the enemy off guard and inflicting significant damage.

Ibrahim Adil Shah I's camp was thrown into chaos by a sudden attack led by Saifuddin Ain-ul-Mulk. Caught off guard while bathing, Ibrahim fled in panic towards Bid and then Paranda abandoning his camp in disarray. His army scattered in all directions, leaving behind tents, baggage, and supplies.

Among the prisoners taken after the battle of Kalyani was Rai Chaitpal, a prominent defector who had once served Burhan Nizam Shah I but later joined the service of Ibrahim Adil Shah I. To serve as a stern warning to others who might consider treachery, Burhan ordered his execution. Rai Chaitpal was executed.

== Aftermath ==
The defeat of Bijapuri army struck fear into the commandant of Kalyani who, realizing the hopelessness of his situation, sent a plea to Burhan Nizam Shah I. In exchange for the safety of his life and property, he agreed to surrender the fort. Burhan accepted the terms, securing a significant victory for Allied Army.

== See also ==
- Ahmednagar Sultanate
- Bijapur Sultanate
- Ibrahim Adil Shah I
