= Battle of Adoni (1543) =

- Part of Deccani–Vijayanagar wars
Date	1543
Location	Adoni, India
Result	Definite Deccani victory

Belligerents
Vijayanagar Empire	Bijapur Sultanate

Commanders and leaders
Venkatadri	Asad Khan

The Battle of Adoni was a battle between the Vijayanagara forces led by Venkatadri and the Bijapur army under the command of Asad Khan. Asad Khan, dispatched by Ibrahim Adil Shah I to capture the strategic fortress of Adoni initially faced resistance from Venkatadri, who arrived with reinforcements to relieve the fort. However, Asad Khan skillfully maneuvered his troops and launched a surprise dawn attack on Venkatadri’s camp, catching the Vijayanagara army off guard. In the ensuing chaos, Venkatadri was forced to retreat, leaving behind his treasures, family, and elephants in the hands of the Bijapur army. Despite regrouping his troops at daybreak, Venkatadri, concerned for the safety of his family and overwhelmed by Asad Khan’s advantage, refrained from continuing the battle. This defeat compelled Venkatadri to seek peace.

== Background ==
Upon hearing of the revolution in Vijayanagara, which saw the overthrow of the usurper Salakam Timma Raju and the coronation of Sadasiva Raya as emperor, Ibrahim Adil Shah I of Bijapur saw an opportunity to advance his interests. Seizing the moment, he dispatched his trusted commander, Asad Khan, with a significant force to capture the strategically important fortress of Adoni. Asad Khan’s siege put the fort on the brink of surrender, raising alarm in Vijayanagara. In response, Rama Raya acted swiftly, sending his brother Venkatadri with a strong contingent to relieve the embattled fortress.

== Battle ==
Asad Khan, upon learning of Venkatadri’s approach, lifted the siege of Adoni and moved to confront him. A sharp engagement followed, but realizing he was at a disadvantage due to the numerical superiority of Venkatadri's Army, Asad Khan retreated in good order, with Venkatadri cautiously pursuing him for about twenty-one miles. By evening, Asad Khan halted and encamped, while Venkatadri, aiming to block any further retreat, set up his camp approximately eight miles away. However, Asad Khan seized the opportunity for a surprise attack. Before sunrise the next day, with a contingent of four thousand elite cavalry, he launched a sudden assault on Venkatadri’s camp, catching him completely off guard. The Bijapur army penetrated deep into the Vijayanagar camp before an alarm could be raised. In the ensuing chaos, Venkatadri narrowly escaped, his treasures, family, and elephants fell into the hands of Asad Khan’s victorious troops.

At daybreak, Venkatadri managed to regroup his scattered troops and positioned them as if preparing for battle. However, upon observing Asad Khan’s readiness to defend his advantage and growing anxious about the safety of his wife and children, he refrained from further engagement and withdrew a few miles to establish a new camp. From there, he wrote to Rama Raya detailing his misfortune and requesting reinforcements. Responding promptly, Rama Raya sent additional troops, supplies, and funds while declaring his resolve to continue the war. Privately, however, he advised Venkatadri to proceed cautiously, expressing his suspicion that Ibrahim Adil Shah I’s siege of Adoni had been instigated by local zamindars in the region and that some of Venkatadri’s officers might be secretly collaborating with the enemy. To secure the release of his wife and family from Asad Khan’s custody, Rama Raya prudently counseled his brother to negotiate peace with the Bijapur at least temporarily.

== Aftermath ==
Acting on Rama Raya's advice, Venkatadri sought the mediation of Asad Khan, securing his influence through a substantial bribe provided by his brother. With Asad Khan’s support, Venkatadri made peace overtures to Ibrahim Adil Shah I, which were promptly accepted. Although the historian Ferishta does not elaborate on the specific terms, the settlement appeared agreeable to both parties, thereby bringing the conflict to a close. Following the peace agreement, Asad Khan rejoined Sultan Ibrahim Adil Shah I and proceeded back to Bijapur. Venkatadri, having successfully secured the release of his family, withdrew to Vijayanagara.

== See also ==
- Bijapur Sultanate
- Ibrahim Adil Shah I
- Rama Raya
