= Siege of Gulbarga =

- Part of Deccani–Vijayanagar wars
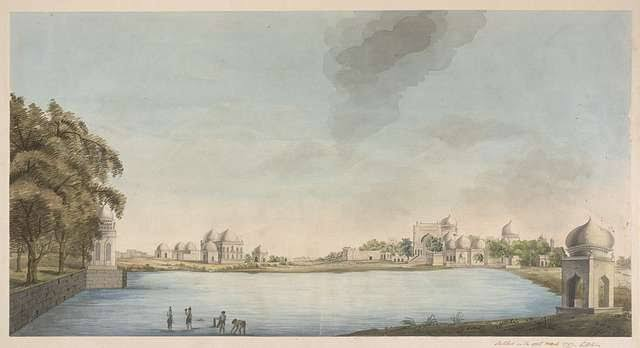
- Tombs And Shrine Inside Gulbarga Fort
Date	1557–1558
Location	Gulbarga, Karnataka, India
Result	Bijapur-Vijayanagar victory

Belligerents
Bijapur Sultanate; Supported By : Vijayanagara Empire	Ahmednagar Sultanate; Golconda Sultanate

Commanders and leaders
Ibrahim Adil Shah I Farang Khan †; Kurshid Khan †; Ashraf Khan †; Rama Raya	Hussain Nizam Shah I Rumi Khan; Madho Ram; Sayyid Shah Hasan; Ghazanfar Khan; Daulat Khan; Miyan Makhdum; Nizam Khan; Ibrahim Quli Qutb Shah Wali

The Siege of Gulbarga was a siege battle where Hussain Nizam Shah I of Ahmadnagar and Ibrahim Quli Qutb Shah Wali of Golconda joined together to capture the fort of Gulbarga from Adil Shah. The fort was well protected with high walls and a deep ditch full of water. The two kings attacked it with cannons and soldiers, and the fight went on for more than a month. Many soldiers died in the battle. Later, Ibrahim Qutb Shah left the siege secretly after receiving a message from Rama Raya of Vijayanagar. This made Husain Nizam Shah lift the siege and retreat back to Ahmednagar.

== Background ==
When news of Hussain Nizam Shah I’s victories and the strength of his large army spread across the region, Ibrahim Quli Qutb Shah Wali of Golconda decided to form an alliance with him. To do this, he sent one of his most trusted and skilled diplomats, Mustafa Khan, to the Ahmadnagar court. Mustafa Khan was warmly welcomed by Hussain Nizam Shah I, and soon they agreed on a treaty. According to the agreement, both rulers would first attack Gulbarga together, and once captured, it would be handed over to Husain Nizam Shah. After that, they would jointly attack Bidar, which would then be given to Ibrahim Qutb Shah. To finalize the treaty, Qasim Beg from Ahmadnagar accompanied Mustafa Khan back to Golconda. It was then decided that both kings would march with their armies from their capitals and meet before Gulbarga. As planned, Hussain Nizam Shah I gathered his forces and set out for Gulbarga. At the same time, Ibrahim Qutb Shah Wali also led his army from Golconda and joined Hussain Nizam Shah I near Gulbarga. Together, the two allied armies surrounded and laid siege to the fortress of Gulbarga.

== Siege ==
The fort of Gulbarga, although built on flat land, was very strong and well-protected. It had a deep and wide ditch filled with water all around it. The fort was cleverly designed so that even cannon fire could not harm its walls. This was because the ground on the outer edge of the ditch was high, causing cannonballs to fly over the walls without hitting them. Also, the deep water-filled ditch made it impossible for soldiers to run across and reach the walls easily, making the fort very hard to attack.

Hussain Nizam Shah I set up his camp in front of the strong Gulbarga fort and began planning the best way to capture it. He gave orders to Rumi Khan and Madho Ram, who were in charge of the artillery, to move the big siege guns close to the edge of the ditch and start firing at the walls. Their goal was to break the walls and make a gap for the soldiers to enter. Rumi Khan and Madho Ram followed the orders, and the rest of the army moved their trenches forward to the edge of the ditch. However, the soldiers inside the fort were very confident in its strength. They were not scared and fought back bravely against the attackers.

During the siege, King Hussain Nizam Shah I gave orders to Sayyid Shah Hasan Inju, a well-known and respected commander, along with Ghazanfar Khan, Daulat Khan, Nizam Khan, Miyan Makhdum, and other leaders, to attack the fort. He told them that after capturing the fort, they should hand it over to the officers of Ibrahim Quli Qutb Shah Wali. These commanders, along with the large army they led, continued the siege of Gulbarga for about a month. During this time, the defenders of the fort fought bravely and did not give up, while the attackers also kept up a strong and determined effort to capture it.

=== Adil Shah Appeal to Rama Raya ===
Eventually, the walls of the Gulbarga fort were broken, and the attacking troops moved in to capture it. The defenders fought back fiercely, and a very bloody and intense battle followed. In the fighting, several important commanders like Farang Khan, Ashraf Khan, and Khurshid Khan were killed. The battle in front of the fort and at the broken wall continued for another full month. Over time, the defenders became extremely weak and had no strength left to fight. They finally sent a message to Ibrahim Adil Shah I explaining how desperate their situation had become. Adil Shah knew he could not defeat Hussain Nizam Shah I alone, especially with Ibrahim Quli Qutb Shah Wali also helping in the siege. So, he sent a message to Rama Raya the ruler of Vijayanagar asking for help against the two attacking kings.

=== Intervention of Rama Raya ===
Rama Raya, remembering how he had once helped Ibrahim Quli Qutb Shah Wali in the past, believed that Ibrahim would be loyal to him in return. So, he wrote a letter to Ibrahim, asking him to break his alliance with Hussain Nizam Shah I and stop attacking Ibrahim Adil Shah I. Rama Raya then left his capital with his army and marched toward Gulbarga. Ibrahim Qutb Shah received both the letter and the news of Rama Raya's arrival at the same time. Fearing what might happen, he broke his promise to Hussain Nizam Shah I and secretly left Gulbarga during the night, returning to Telangana. When Husain Nizam Shah found out about Ibrahim Quli Qutub Shah Wali's sudden escape the next morning, he became very angry. In his rage, he suspected that Qasim Beg the person who had helped create the treaty was also involved in Ibrahim’s betrayal.

After questioning Qasim Beg carefully, Hussain Nizam Shah I became certain that he was to blame for Ibrahim Quli Qutb Shah Wali’s betrayal. He ordered Qasim Beg to be arrested and sent to prison in Paranda Fort. Maulana Inayatullah Nayati, a wise and respected scholar who had been brought to the royal court by Qasim Beg, became scared after seeing his patron jailed. He quickly fled and went to the court of Ibrahim Quli Qutb Shah Wali for safety. To replace Qasim Beg, Maulana 'Ali Mazandarani, a scholar known especially for his skill in rhetoric, was made the new vakil (chief representative). Bhopal Rai, who had earlier served Malik Barid and later joined the Ahmadnagar court on the advice of the late king, was appointed as the new Wazir (minister).

After Ibrahim Quli Qutb Shah Wali left Gulbarga and returned to his capital, Hussain Nizam Shah I realized that it was no longer wise to stay there. So, he ended the siege and retreated back to Ahmadnagar with his army.

== Aftermath ==
When Hussain Nizam Shah I returned to Ahmadnagar, he called Qasim Beg to appear before him and ordered him to retire to his own lands. However, after some time, the king forgave him and restored him to his former position as vakil and Peshwa. Around the same time, Maulana Inayatullah, who had fled to Telangana earlier, received a promise of safety from the king. Trusting this, he returned to Ahmadnagar and was once again accepted into royal service.

== See also ==
- Vijayanagara Empire
- Bijapur Sultanate
- Hussain Nizam Shah I
