= Vijayanagara invasion of Golconda =

1562–1563 Vijayanagara military campaign

Vijayanagar Invasion of Golconda
- Part of Deccani–Vijayanagar wars
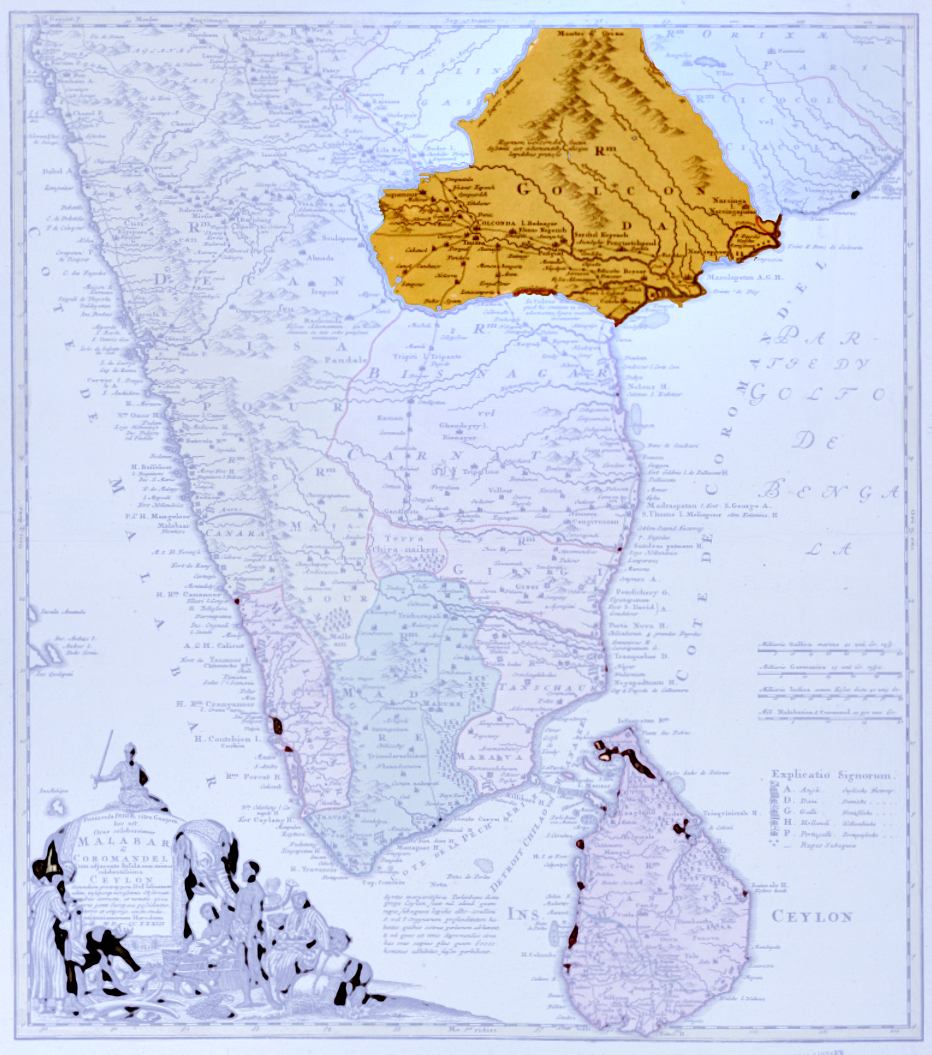
- A map of Golconda region from 1733, published by Homann Heirs Nuremberg
Date	1562–1563
Location	Andhra Pradesh, Telangana, India
Result	Vijayanagar victory
Territorial changes	Ibrahim Qutub Shah Ceded the forts of Ghanpur and Pangal to Rama Raya

Belligerents
Vijayanagar Empire; Supported by: Deccan Sultanates: Bijapur Sultanate; Bidar Sultanate	Golconda Sultanate

Commanders and leaders
Rama Raya; Venkatadri; Jagadeva Rao; Bin-ool-Mulk	Ibrahim Quli Qutb Shah Wali; Mujahid Khan; Mustafa Khan

Strength
115,000	

The Vijayanagara invasion of Golconda happened in the from 1562–1563 when Rama Raya wanted to control more land in the Deccan. He sent his army under the command of his brother Venkatadri and Jagadeva Rao to attack the Golconda Sultanate, which was ruled by the Ibrahim Qutb Shah. The Vijayanagara army captured some forts and important places. Golconda was forced to make peace and give up some land. After some talks, Rama Raya agreed to stop the war and return, keeping the forts of Ghanpur and Pangal.

== Background ==
In 1562, trouble started again after a short time of peace. Hussain Nizam Shah I of Ahmadnagar wanted to thank Sultan Ibrahim Qutb Shah of Golconda for helping him during a siege, so he sent an envoy named Moulana Inayatullah. He also suggested a marriage alliance. Ibrahim Qutb Shah agreed, and the next year, they met near Kalyani. At this meeting, Hussain Nizam Shah I's daughter, Bibi Jamal, married Ibrahim Qutb Shah. After celebrating for a month, both kings joined forces to attack Kalyani. In response, Ali Adil Shah I of Bijapur asked Rama Raya the ruler of Vijayanagar, for help and sent his messengers Kishwar Khan and Abu Turab. At the same time, he invited Ali Barid Shah I to join their alliance.

Rama Raya the ruler of Vijayanagar, first sent his brother Venkatadri with generals Jagadeva Rao and Bin-ool-Mulk to attack the southern areas of the Golconda Sultanate. Their army had 15,000 cavalry and 30,000 infantry. They later joined the Adil Shahi army near the Krishna River. Then, Rama Raya himself marched with the main Vijayanagar army, which included 50,000 cavalry and many foot soldiers, toward Kalyani. Soon, the rulers Ali Barid Shah I and Burhan Imad Shah also joined Rama Raya's side with their armies. When Ibrahim Qutb Shah and Hussain Nizam Shah I heard about this large force moving toward them, they met to discuss the situation. Realizing they were outnumbered, they stopped the siege of Kalyani and returned to their own capitals.

== Invasion ==
After leaving Kalyani, Ibrahim Qutb Shah sent Mujahid Khan with an army to stop the enemy forces. A battle happened near Torgal and lasted for several days, but neither side won clearly. At the same time, Rama Raya sent Sida Raya Timapa, the chief of Kandbir, with 50,000 cavalry to attack Kondapalli and Masulipatam. He also sent his son-in-law, Jotumraj, with 20,000 horsemen to attack Devarakonda and Indrakonda. Meanwhile, Rama Raya's own army was busy raiding areas near Golconda. Many small fights took place near the Sultan's gardens and the village of Bijwara. These military actions went on for four months. In the end, Jagadeva Rao convinced the local chiefs of Pangal, Rovilkonda, and Ghanpur to hand over their forts to Rama Raya, and Kasi Rao also gave him the keys to Indrakonda.

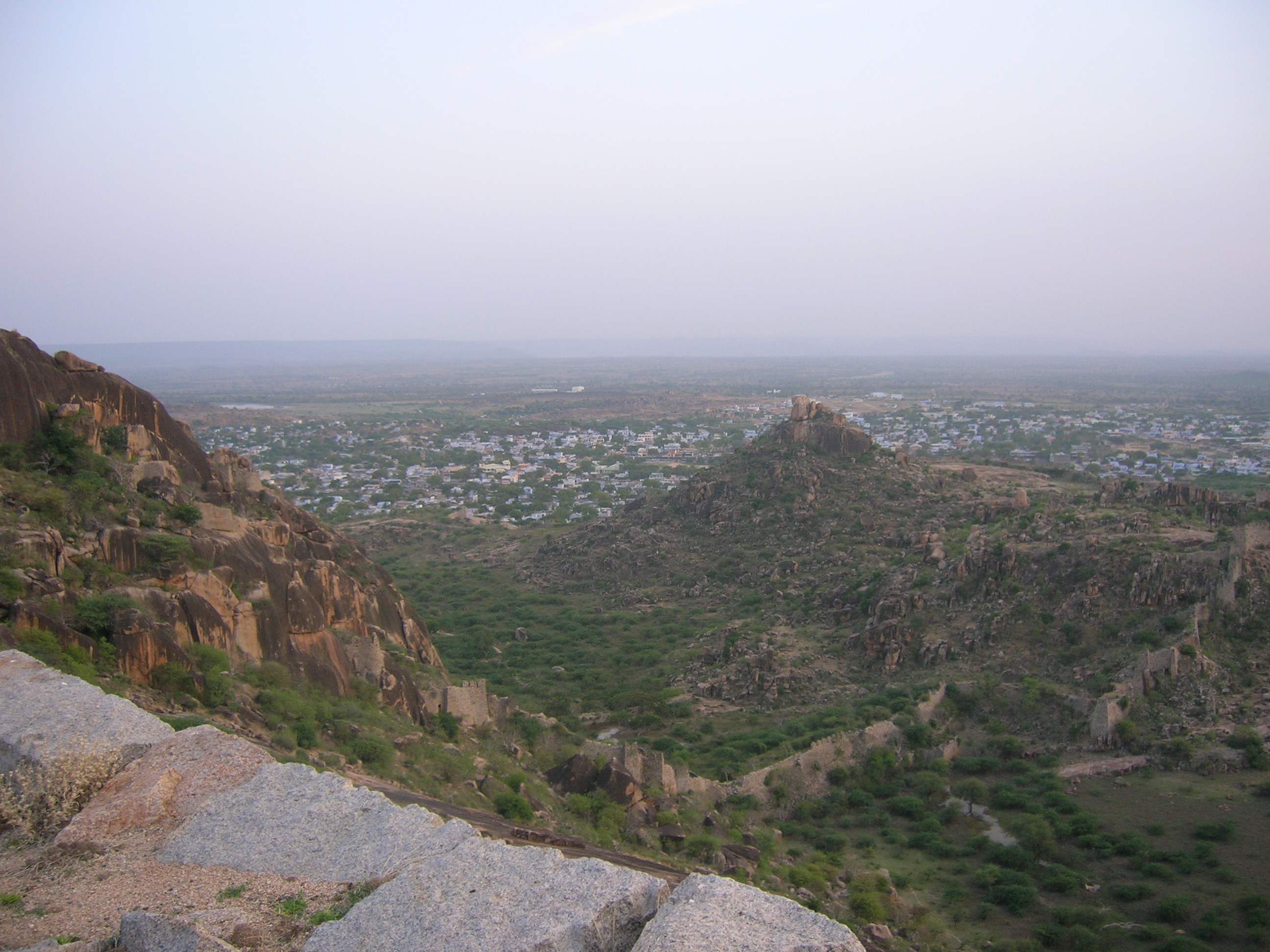
Devarakonda Fort from hill

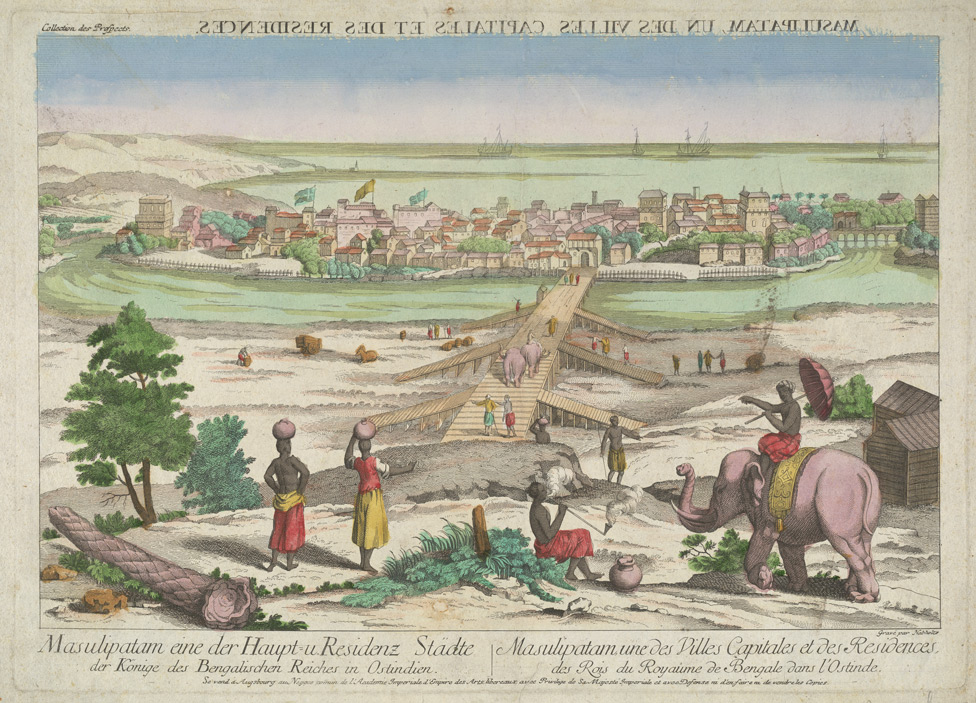
Masulipatam

Rama Raya's allies began attacking the southern parts of Golconda. The Raja of Kandbir attacked Kondapalli, while the Shitab Khan and Vidiadri from Rajahmundry attacked the fort of Eluru. Chinnapa Naidu, the Raja of Venkatagiri, along with his sons Nayanappa and Timma, captured the fort of Gandikota. With his kingdom under attack and limited to his capital, the Sultan of Golconda decided to lead his army himself and fight the enemies at Tarpalli. Just then, a messenger arrived from Ali Barid Shah I, one of the allied rulers, suggesting peace talks. He asked Ibrahim Qutb Shah to send his minister, Mustafa Khan, to the camp for negotiations. Secretly, Mustafa Khan was told to win over Jagadeva Rao, as the Sultan believed peace would not be possible without his support.

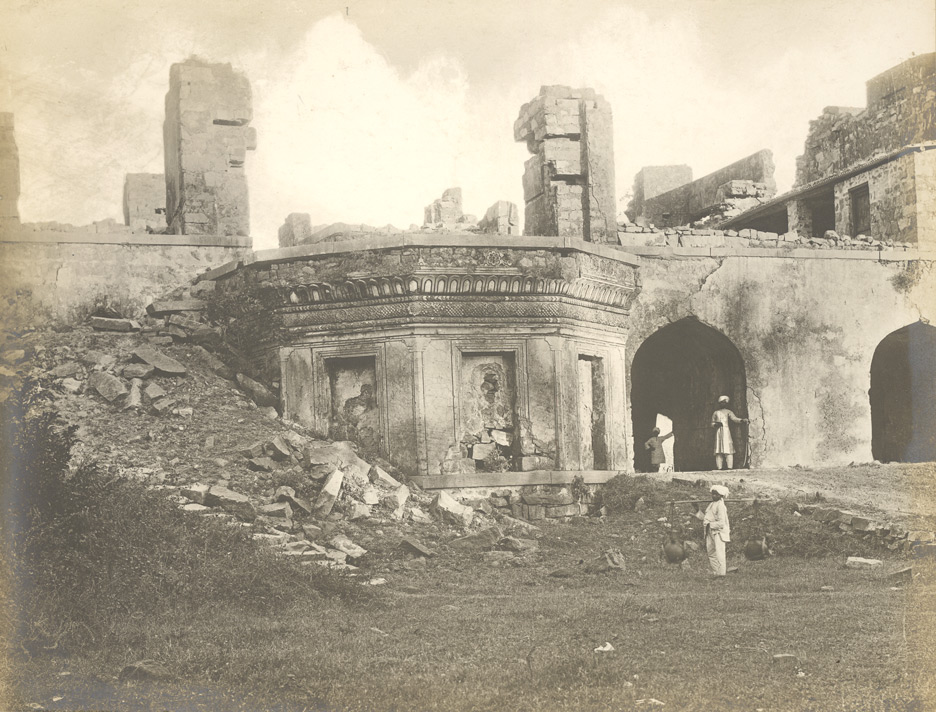
Throne at the palace, Kondapalli, Kistna District

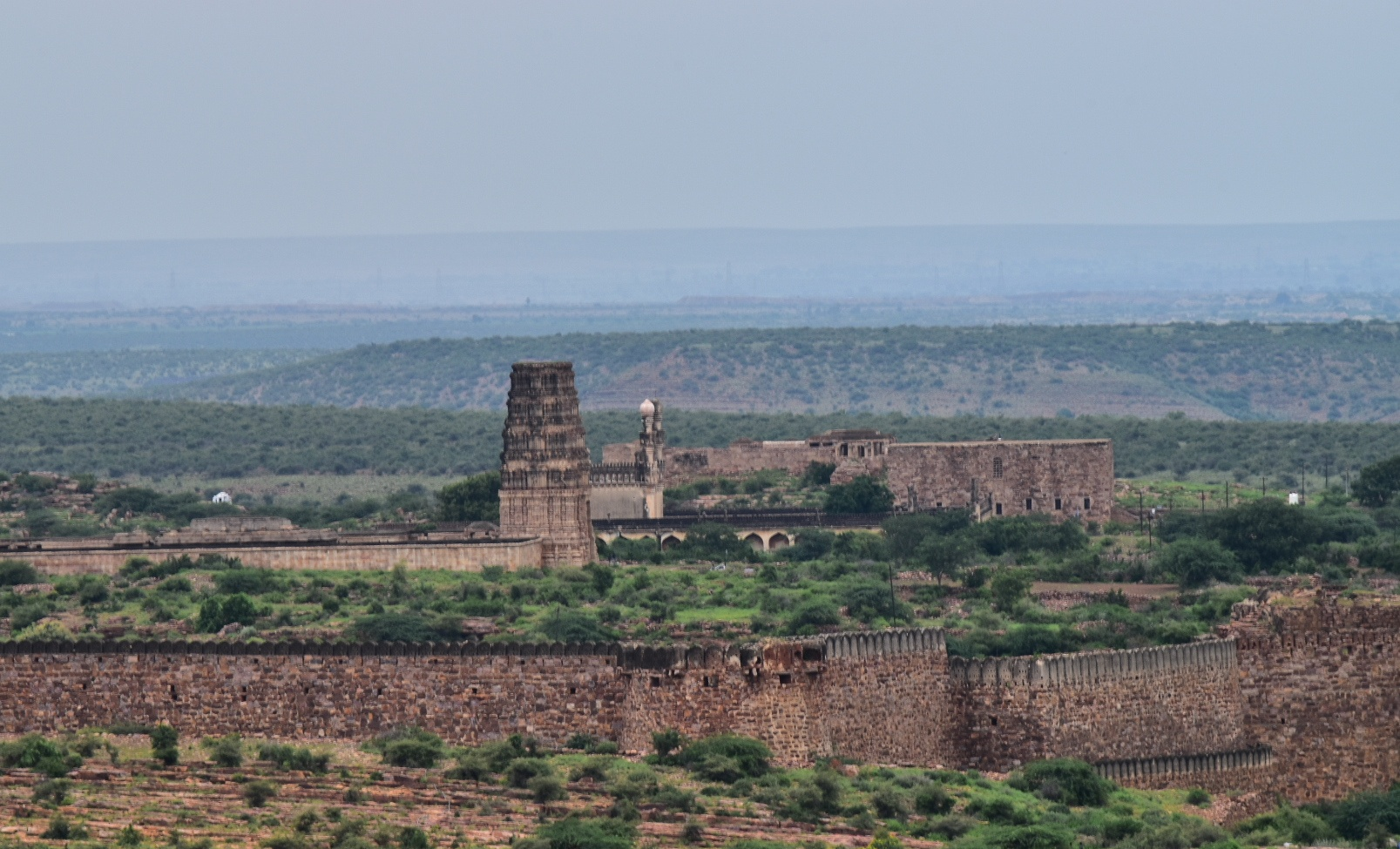
Gandikota fort from Kottapalli

== Aftermath ==
With the help of Jagadeva Rao, Mustafa Khan was able to meet with Ali Adil Shah I. Together, they went to Rama Raya’s camp to talk about peace. After some discussion, Rama Raya agreed though unwillingly to return to Vijayanagar. However, he set one condition he would only retreat if he was allowed to keep control of the forts of Ghanpur and Pangal. The other rulers accepted this, and the alliance between them came to an end. Each ruler then returned to his own capital.

== See also ==
- Ibrahim Qutub Shah
- Rama Raya
- Golconda Sultanate
