= Burhan Nizam Shah I =

Sultan of Ahmadnagar from 1509 to 1553

2nd Sultan of Ahmadnagar
- Reign: 1509 – 30 December 1553
- Predecessor: Malik Ahmad Nizam Shah I
- Successor: Hussain Nizam Shah I
- Born: 1502
- Died: 30 December 1553 (aged 50–51)
- Spouse: Bibi Amina; Bibi Mariam
- Issue: Hussain Nizam Shah I; Abdul Qadir; Muhammad Khudabanda; Miran Muhammad Baqir; Shah Ali; Shah Haidar
- House: Nizam Shahi Dynasty
- Father: Malik Ahmad Nizam Shah I
- Religion: Sunni Islam (until 1538); Twelver Shi'ism

Burhan Nizam Shah I (Persian: برهان نظام شاه یکم; c. 1502 – 30 December 1553) was ruler of the Ahmednagar Sultanate, in Deccan. He ascended the throne on the death of his father Ahmad Nizam Shah I in 1508 or 1510 when he was seven years old. He died in 1553 and was succeeded by Hussain Nizam Shah I.

He converted to Shia Islam and royals and commoners followed suit. Sunni theologians and their followers resented this but were crushed. His reign was characterized by religious tolerance, art and flourishing trade. Skirmishes with the Mughals, Bijapur and various other small states continued through his reign. A palace built for Burhan Shah, the second Nizam, stands in ruins two miles south-east of the city of Ahmednagar.

== Conversion to Shi'ism ==
Ever since the arrival of Shah Tahir, Ahmadnagar had become a centre of Shia faith. He gradually influenced Sunni Burhan Nizam Shah to embrace Shi'ism. After listening to Shah Tahir's arguments and his debates with scholars such as Maulana Pir Muhammad Shirwani, Shaikh Ja'far, Qazi Muhammad Niyati, Qazi Zainul Abidin, Syed Ishaq, Qazi Wilayat Abrar and others, Burhan announced his conversion to Shi'ism. He ordered the names of the first three Caliphs to be dropped from the khutbah and replaced by those of the Twelve Imams. The establishment of the Twelver Shi'ism aroused the anger of Sunni theologians, including Qazi Abrar, Maulana Abdul Awwal and Pir Muhammad Shirwani. Gathering about 3,000 followers, they planned to overthrow Burhan and place on the throne his son Abdul Qadir, who had staunchly refused to accept Shi'ism. The rebels were eventually captured and imprisoned. Meanwhile the rulers of the neighbouring states formed a confederacy and attacked Ahmadnagar. Burhan Nizam Shah patched hostilities with Sultan Muhammad Shah II of Gujarat and Muhammad Khan Faruqi. He forced Ibrahim Adil Shah of Bijapur to withdraw.

== Family ==
Burhan Nizam Shah had at least two wives. The first, his favourite, was Bibi Amina. The second was Bibi Mariam, the daughter of Yusuf Adil Shah, Sultan of Bijapur. He had six sons:

By Bibi Amina

- Hussain Nizam Shah I, Sultan of Ahmednagar;
- Abdul Qadir;

By Bibi Mariam

- Miran Muhammad Baqir;
- Shah Ali, father of Murtaza Nizam Shah II;

By other wives

- Shah Haidar, married the daughter of Khwaja Jahan, the ruler of Parinda;
- Muhammad Khudabanda;
