= History of Bidar =

Bidar is a historic place and city located in the north-eastern part of the South Indian state of Karnataka. Bidar is situated and built on the brink of a plateau, and thus stands above the lowlands (talghat) towards the north and the east.

== Ancient period ==
Traditional tales describe Bidar as the place where Vidura (one of the central character in the hindu epic Mahabharata) lived and the place was thus known as Viduranagara. Legend has associated Bidar with the ancient kingdom of Vidarbha, to which references are found in early Hindu literature. But the situation of the latter kingdom has been determined by modern research, and it is now considered that Vidarbha occupied the country which was called Berar. The rulers of the kingdom are supposed to have been vassals of the Andhra rajas, whose dominions covered the plateau of the Deccan and at times extended over a much wider area. Bidar, which is some 200 miles (320 km) south-east of Paithan, the ancient capital of the Andhra kings, must have been included in the territory of the latter, and it has been associated with Vidarbha apparently on account of the similarity in names Bidar and Vidarbha. The identity of Bidar with Vidarbha was, however, a common belief in Firishta's time, for he, when referring to the romances of the early rulers of Bidar, describes the love-story of Nala and Damayanti (daughter of Raja Bhima of Vidarbha).

The ancient megalithic culture began from about 1200 B.C.-1100 B.C., flourished up to about 3rd and 2nd century B.C. and survived up to c. 100 B.C. The megalithic culture of the region perhaps had intrusions of two Megalithic strains of different sort from the Vidharba region and eastern India, indicating respectively by certain pottery types particularly lids and also by horse-bits & copper objects on the one hand and the stone alignments on the other in north-eastern part of Karnataka.

This region formed the southern part of Mauryan Empire as attested by the edicts of Ashoka. It came to be a part of Mauryan empire by the fact that Mauryas defeated the Nandas and became the heirs to the Nanda Empire in which Karnataka was also included. Bindusara ruled over the Deccan including the parts of Karnataka.

Satavahanas dominated the post-Mauryan period for about four centuries. Gautamiputra Satakarni established his reign which was succeeded by his son Vashishtiputra Pulumāyi. Coins of this period are found in plenty in the deccan region which can be dated to a period from the 1st century to 3rd century.

== Classical period ==
During the Kadamba's reign, the rule of Mayurasharma (325–345) and that of Kakusthavarma (405–430) were prominent. Their rule was confined up to the southern part of Bidar district. Kadambas extended their patronage to Shaiva, Vaishnava and Jaina dharmas. Their rule lasted for over 200 years.

The history of the (Deccan) region in general and Karnataka in particular assumes special significance with the commencement of the rule of the Chalukyas of Badami (c. 500–757) also called as the Early Western Chalukyas to distinguish them from the Later Chalukyas who ruled from their Capital at Kalyana. The Chinese traveller Hieun-Tsang visited the Chalukyan kingdom during 634–635 under the reign of Pulakeshi II and has paid a handsome tribute to the king and the prosperity of the kingdom. Kirtivarma II (c.745–757) was the last ruler of the dynasty which was established by Jayasimha who ruled between 500 and 520.

== Medieval period ==
Rashtrakutas established their rule from early 750s which lasted till early 970s. They were highly distinguished dynasties of the Deccan & Karnataka. Some accounts relate them to Latur as the place of their origins. Krishna I and Govinda III were the great kings of the period. Amoghavarsha I moved the capital to Manyakheta (present day Malkhed) and beautified it. He patronised many religions including Buddhism. After a long reign of 64 years, he died in 878 and was succeeded by his son, Krishna II, who later developed friendly relations with the Arabs.

The Rashtrakuta Empire was perhaps the most extensive than any of their Hindu successors in the Deccan. In no other period of ancient Indian history did the Deccan enjoy their political prestige which it did during the time of Rashtrakutas. The remarks of Arab traveller Sulaiman (851) that this empire was one of the four great empires of the world and they were the most feared rulers of India. Temple building saw a great boom in this period. Ellora and other rock-cut / cave temples have been built under this dynasty.

The Chalukyas of Kalyana were so called because they ruled from their capital Kalyananagara (modern day Basavakalyan) and are considered to be the descendants of the Chalukyas of Badami. The first king of the dynasty was Taila II (Tailapa II) who ruled from 973–997 after overthrowing Karka II, the last king of Rashtrakutas. The famous kannada poet Ranna also mentions of him belonging to Badami lineage. Taila II fought against the Cholas and defeated Rajaraja Chola in 992 and later his son Ahavamalla (Satyashraya) in 995 again defeated Chola's Army.

Satyashraya who had the titles of Ahavamalla, Irivabedanga, Sahasabhima and Sattiga ruled from 997 to 1008 The hostility between Chalukyas and Cholas continued during this period also. Rajaraja Chola I and later his son Rajendra Chola marched against Satyashraya. The Cholas came up to Bijapur (present day Vijayapura) and ransacked the whole kingdom causing great violence. But Satyashraya drove them back. Ranna was patronised by Satyashraya. Despite his military engagements, he built his capital Kalyana and made it famous.

The fifty-year rule of Vikramaditya VI (1076–1127) was a glorious period in Karnataka's history. Many temples were built in this period which have some of the finest sculpture. In the temple at Jalsangi (Jalasangvi) is a beautiful sculpture which depicts a young woman writing an inscription paying great tribute to Vikramaditya VI. Thus Karnataka became a great centre of cultural activities. He was succeeded by Someshvara III (father of Taila III).

During the reign of Taila III (1149–1162), the Kalachuri Bijjala II was first to rebel against the Chalukyans and was largely responsible for the downfall of Chalukyas. By 1153, he proclaimed independence and occupied many parts of the Chalukyan kingdom. Thus was the southern Kalachuri established.

The Kalachuris belonged to the Kattacchhuri family which ruled in Madhya Pradesh. Bijjala II was son of Permadi. Kalachuri chiefs were subordinates to the Chalukyans and were also in matrimonial alliances with them. Bijjala II was also a grandson of Vikramaditya VI. In about 1162, Bijjala II defeated Taila III replacing him as King. But his rule came to an end after 5 years due to opposition by the loyal feaudatories of Chalukyas. In all his political activities, Bijjala II was greatly helped by his able General Kasapayyanayaka. Bijjalas treasurer was the celebrated religious leader Basaveshwara. Bijjala II died in 1167 Singhana was the last king of Kalachuri Dynasty which ended in 1184.

Someshvara IV (successor of Taila III) who had left the kingdom and ruled in nominal capacity re-captured the kingdom from Kalachuris in 1184 with the help of his able General Brahma and ruled until 1186. He was then challenged by the Hoysalas and Seunas. He lived up to 1198 as testified by the inscriptions but he was no longer the Chalukyan monarch. Hoysala Ballala II took over the Basavakalyan fort.

During all this period it was political supremacy and cultural development moving hand in hand. In administration it evolved new principles which made the people happy and kingdoms prospered. Some of the luminaries in Kannada and Samskrita flourished in this era. The period also marked inauguration of a new social and religious movement under the leadership if Basaveshwara. This helped the growth of Vachana literature in Kannada.

In the excavations carried out by the Archaeological Department, State of Hyderabad, some sculptures and broken tablets bearing inscriptions have been found in the Bidar fort; but they do not carry back the history of the place earlier than the 10th century, when it was apparently included in the kingdom of the later Chalukyas (A.D. 974–1190), whose capital, Kalyani (present day Basavakalyan) is only 36 miles (58 km) west of Bidar. The power of the Chalukyas, however, rapidly declined during the rule of the last three kings of the dynasty, and a large portion of their territory was occupied by the Yadavas of Deogiri and the Kakatiyas of Warangal, whose kingdoms were at the zenith of their glory in the eleventh and twelfth centuries. Bidar was apparently annexed to the Kakatiya kingdom, for in 1322, when Prince Ulugh Khan marched upon Warangal, he besieged and conquered the town of Bidar, which was on the frontiers of Telangana.

An inscription of Ghiyath-ud-Din Tughluq, dated 1323, recently found at Kalyani, shows that the latter town was also conquered by Ulugh Khan in this expedition, but the absence of Kalyani's name in this connexion in contemporary history shows that Bidar at that time was a more important town than Kalyani, the glory of which seems to have faded with the decline of the Chalukyas. In this inscription Kalyani is mentioned as only a qasba, or minor town.

=== Bahmani Sultanate ===
The Delhi Sultanate invaded the area first by Allauddin Khilji, and later, Muhammed-bin-Tughluq took control of entire Deccan including Bidar. In the middle of the 14th century, the Sultan of Delhi's officers that were stationed in Deccan rebelled and this resulted in the establishment of Bahmanid Dynasty in 1347 at Gulbarga/Hasanabad (present Kalaburagi). There was frequent warfare between the Bahmanids and the Vijaynagar Kingdom.

The history of the present fort at Bidar is attributed to the sultan Ahmed Shah Wali Bahmani, the sultan of the Bahmani dynasty till 1427, when he shifted his capital from Gulbarga to Bidar since it had better climatic conditions and was also a fertile and fruit-bearing land. The earliest recorded history of its existence as a small and strong fort is also traced to prince Ulugh Khan in 1322, whereafter it came under the reign of the Tughlaq dynasty.

With the establishment of the Bahmanid dynasty (1347), Bidar was occupied by Sultan Ala-ud-Din Bahman Shah Bahmani. During the rule of Ahmad Shah I (1422–1486), Bidar was made the capital city of Bahmani Kingdom. The old fort was rebuilt and madrasas, mosques, palaces, and gardens were raised. Mahmud Gawan, who became the prime minister in 1466, was a notable figure in the history of Bidar.

== Early modern period ==
=== Bidar and Bijapur sultanates ===
The Bidar Sultanate (also known as Barid Shahi dynasty) ruled the city formally from 1542 to 1619, although they formally held power since 1492. The dynasty was founded by Qasim Barid, who served as Prime Minister of the Bahmani Sultanate. His son Amir Barid succeeded him as Prime Minister and later became de facto ruler when the last Bahmani ruler fled from Bidar.

Ali Barid Shah I, son of Amir Barid was the first to assume the royal title of Shah. He also played a key role in the Battle of Talikota. The Bidar Sultanate ruled Bidar until its conquest by the Sultanate of Bijapur in 1619.

Aurangzeb came to Bidar after his father, Padshah (emperor) Shah Jahan, appointed him the Prince of Deccan. He wrested the Bidar Fort from the Adil Shahis after a 21-day war in 1656. With this, Bidar became a part of the Mughal dynasty for the second time.

=== Bidar Subah ===
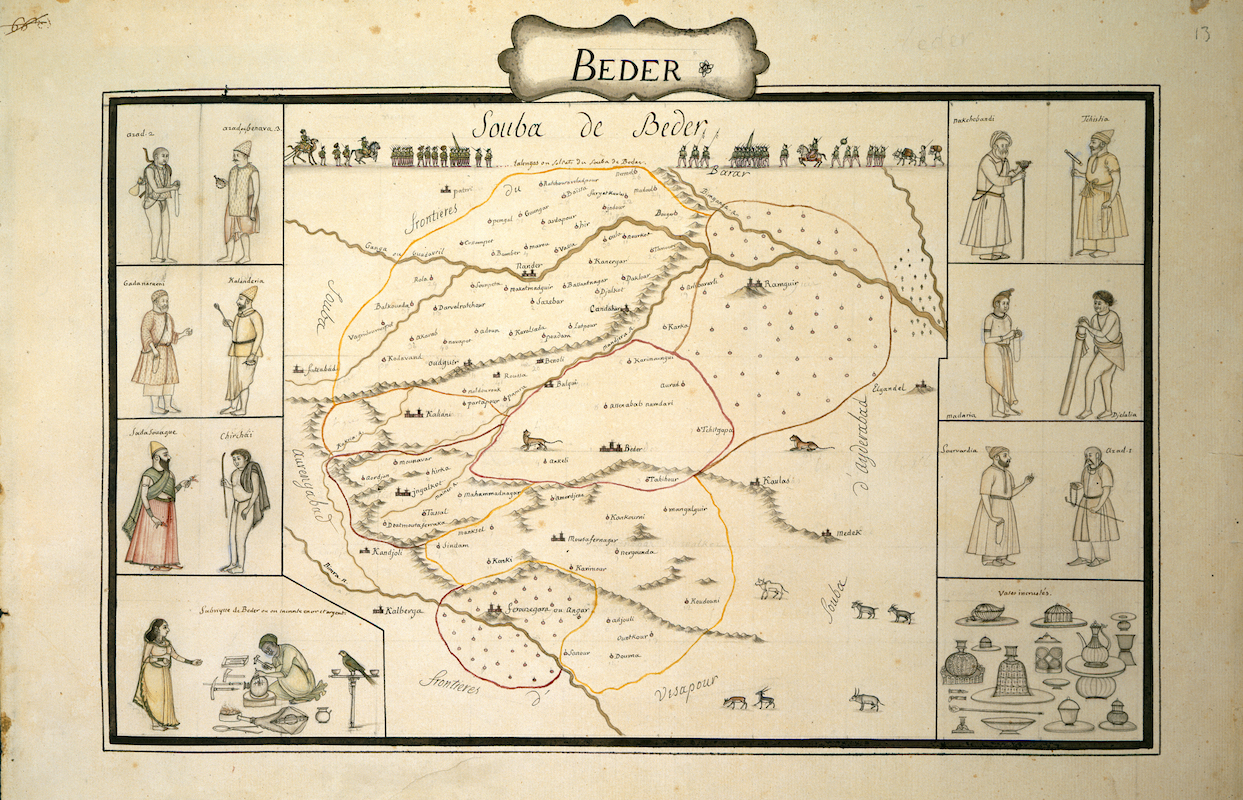
Elaborately illustrated map of the Bidar Subah of the Mughal Empire, commissioned by Jean Baptiste Joseph Gentil, ca.1770

Following Bidar's conquest by the Mughal Empire in 1656, it was made the capital of the new Bidar Subah, (an imperial top-level province) which Telangana Subah was merged into the next year.

== Hyderabad State and British colonial rule ==
In 1724, Bidar became a part of the Asaf Jahi Kingdom of the Nizams. Third son of Asaf jah l (Nizam l) Mir Sa'id Muhammad Khan, Salabat Jang ruled from Bidar fort from 1751 to 1762, till his brother Mir Nizam Ali Khan Asaf Jah III imprisoned him in this fort, and was killed in Bidar fort on 16 September 1763. Mohammedabad old name of Bidar is also on his name. It was connected to Hyderabad by rail in the early 20th century.

== Post-independence period ==
After India's independence, in 1956 all Kannada speaking areas were merged to form the Mysore State and Bidar became part of the new Mysore (now Karnataka) state.
