= Siege of Bidar =

1657 Mughal victory in Karnataka, India

- Part of Mughal-Bijapur War 1657-1686
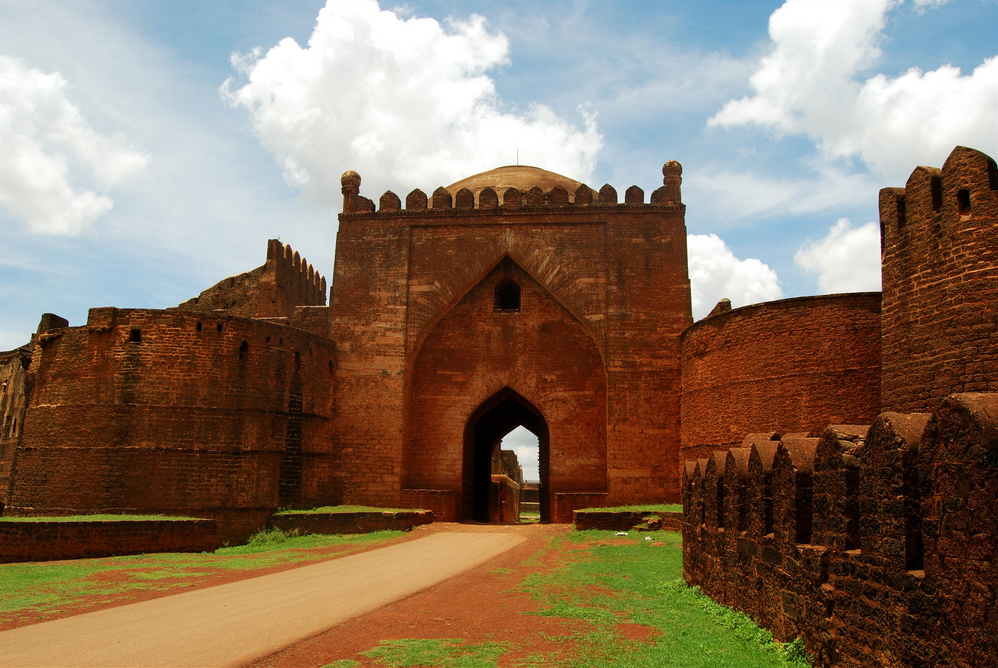
- Gateway to Bidar Fort
Date	2–29 March 1657 (3 weeks and 6 days)
Location	Bidar Fort
Result	Mughal victory
Territorial changes	City of Bidar incorporated into the Mughal Empire

Belligerents
Mughal Empire	Adil Shahi dynasty

Commanders and leaders
Aurangzeb; Mir Jumla II Iftikhar Khan	Siddi Marjan

Strength
	5,000 Total; 1,000 cavalry 4,000 infantry

The siege of Bidar (March 1657) was a twenty-seven day siege of Bidar Fort (in Bidar, a city in present-day Karnataka, India) mounted by the Mughal Empire against the Bijapur Sultanate. The siege was led by the Mughal prince Aurangzeb during the reign of his father Shah Jahan, and was the opening military confrontation to his broader invasion of the Bijapur Sultanate that same year. The garrison was commanded by Siddi Marjan, governor of the city, who eventually surrendered and then died of his wounds. The siege was a Mughal victory, with Bijapur subsequently negotiating a peace treaty with Shah Jahan. The city of Bidar was ceded to the Mughal Empire, becoming one of the earliest cities in the Deccan to fall into Mughal control.

== Background ==
The city of Bidar had been in the control of the Bijapur Sultanate since 1619, when Ibrahim Adil Shah II had annexed the Bidar Sultanate and ended the Barid Shahi dynasty. Ibrahim Adil Shah appointed an Abyssinian named Sidi Marjan or Malik Marjan as the city's governor. He governed the city for around thirty years, and under his tenure Bidar Fort underwent extensive fortification work and repairs. Lying on the northeastern frontier of the Sultanate, Bidar and its fort had strategic importance.

In 1652, the Mughal prince Aurangzeb, son of reigning emperor Shah Jahan, was appointed for the second time as Viceroy of the Deccan, governor of all Mughal holdings in the Deccan region. Aurangzeb was an advocate of annexing the Deccan Sultanates in order to expand Mughal territory southwards and make the Deccan provinces more prosperous; the Mughal-Deccan territories at the time did not yield the revenue needed to sustain Aurangzeb's princely establishment. Aurangzeb and the turncoat Mughal vizier Mir Jumla had been devising plans to seize Bijapur upon the reigning sultan Muhammad Adil Shah's death, and Aurangzeb had been bribing nobles and commanders of Bijapur to defect. In November of 1656 the sultan died; his successor Ali Adil Shah II was only eighteen and faced a precarious position in the court. On 26 November 1656 Shah Jahan permitted Aurangzeb to invade Bijapur territory. On 18 January 1657, Aurangzeb arrived in the Mughal capital of the Deccan, Aurangabad. Accompanied by his son Muhammad Mu'azzam and generals Mir Jumla and Iftikhar Khan, he began marching towards Bidar, the first stop on the path to invading Bijapur.

== Siege ==
Aurangzeb and his army arrived in Bidar on 28 February, and commenced their siege of the fort on 2 March. Siddi Marjan's garrison at the fort numbered 1,000 cavalry and 4,000 infantry. In the first few days of the siege, the Mughal army was able to dig trenches upto the moat of the fort, after which they filled up the moat. This was in spite of heavy fire from the fort garrison and sorties dispatched by Siddi Marjan. Mughal artillery was then able to destroy two bastions and a section of the lower wall. On 29 March, a Mughal party scaled the wall and hurled rockets at the defending forces. This unintentionally detonated a gunpowder store in the fort, the explosion of which wounded Siddi Marjan and his sons. The Mughals then stormed the citadel, and Aurangzeb entered the fort in a victory procession. Siddi Marjan surrendered the fort, bringing the siege to a close after twenty-seven days of fighting. Siddi Marjan later died of his injuries on 1 April.

While the siege was ongoing, the Bijapur Sultanate had deputed a relief expedition under the command of Khan Muhammad, the prime minister of the Sultanate, but this force retreated before ever reaching Bidar.

== Aftermath ==
On 18 April, Aurangzeb visited Bidar and re-entered the Bidar Fort. At the fort's principal mosque, the Solah Khamba Mosque, he had the khutba recited in Shah Jahan's name, symbolising Mughal sovereignty over the city. He seized 12 lakh rupees, 230 guns, and 8 lakh rupees worth of ammunitions from the fort.

Aurangzeb would go on to successfully capture the fort of Kalyani two months after the capitulation of Bidar, but his invasion of Bijapur would be cut short by a peace treaty negotiated by Shah Jahan with Bijapur which ceded Bidar, Parenda, and Kalyani. Bidar was incorporated into the Mughal Empire and renamed Zafarabad (lit. 'City of Victory'), becoming one of the earliest cities of the Deccan to fall into Mughal control. This name appears on Mughal coins subsequently minted at Bidar. Iftikhar Khan, who had participated in the siege, was made Bidar's first Mughal governor. The city would remain under Mughal control, administered by a string of governors, until it became a part of the Nizam-administered Deccan.
