= Chulki Nala =

Chulki Nala Chulki Nala

Location
- Country: India
- State: Karnataka
- District: Bidar
- Municipality: Basavakalyan

Physical characteristics
- Source
  - location: Chowkiwadi, Basavakalyan Taluka, Bidar District, Karnataka, India
- Mouth: Karanja River
  - location: Karnataka, India
- Length: 42 km (26 mi)

Chulki Nala is a river in Bidar District. It starts at Chowkiwadi in Basavakalyan taluka. It flows for 42 km in Bidar district and joins the river Karanja. A Composite Dam is built near Mustapur village of Basava Kalyana Taluk in Bidar District for Irrigation and Drinking water purposes. The dam has a storage capacity of 0.93 tmcft of water. The catchment area is 243.55 km^{2}. It provides drinking water to Basavakalyan town.
