= Bidar Fort =

Fort in Bidar, Karnataka, India

- Old City, Bidar, Karnataka, India
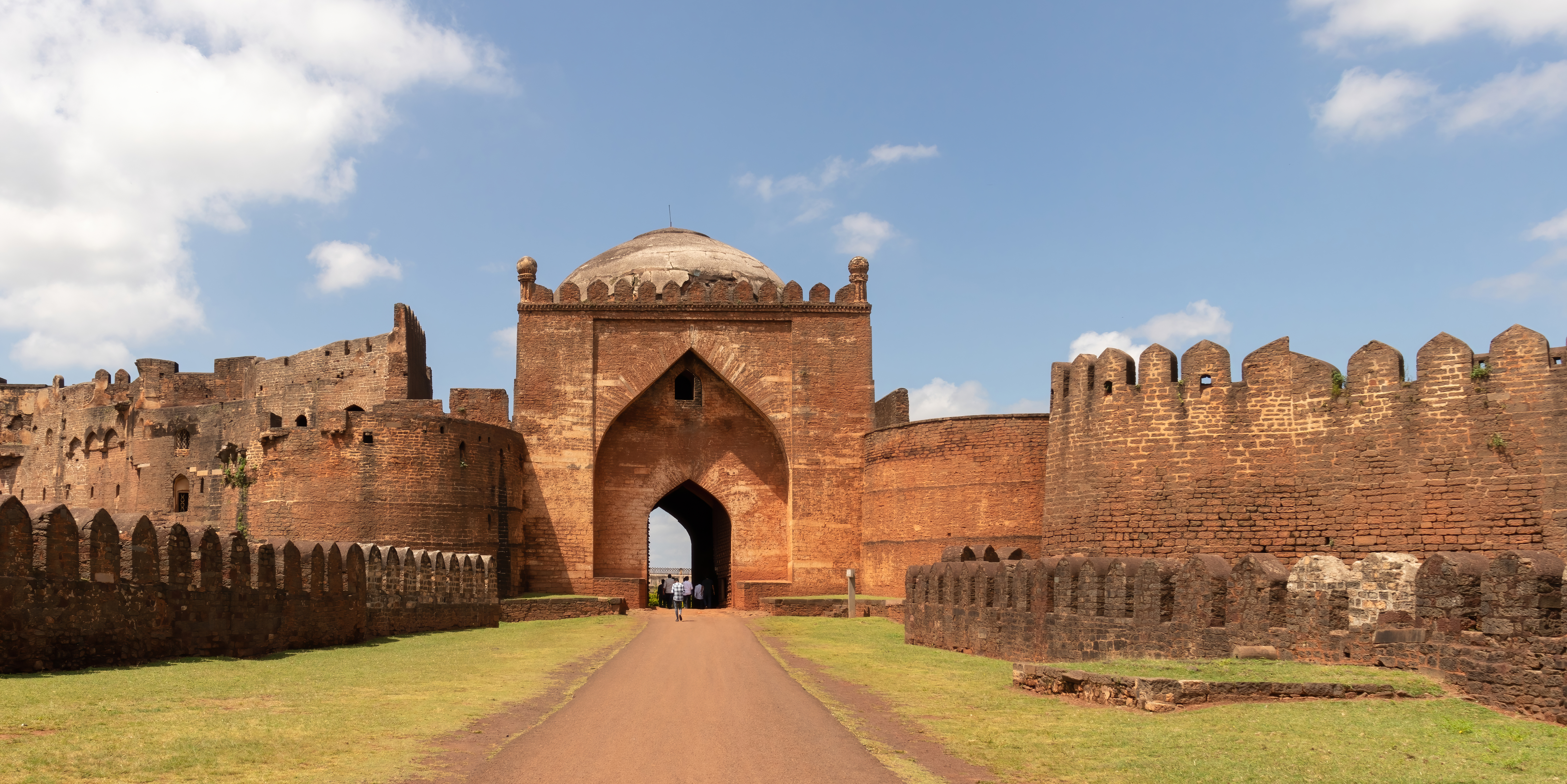
- Gumbaz Dharwaza, which acts as entrance into the fort

Site information
- Type: Fort
- Controlled by: Government of Karnataka
- Open to the public: Yes
- Condition: Ruins

Location
- Location within Karnataka
- Coordinates: 17°55′28″N 77°31′36″E
- Height: 670 metres (2,200 ft)

Site history
- Built: 15th century CE
- Built by: Ahmad Shah I of the Bahamani dynasty from 1429 to 1432
- Materials: Laterite and lime mortar
- Battles/wars: Siege of Bidar

Garrison information
- Garrison: Bidar Garrison

UNESCO World Heritage Site
- Type: Cultural
- Criteria: ii, iii
- Designated: 2014 (Tentative list)
- Region: Asia-Pacific

Bidar Fort is located in the old city area, Bidar, Karnataka, India. The fort, the city and the district are all affixed with the name Bidar. Sultan Ahmad Shah I of the Bahmanid dynasty shifted his capital from Gulbarga to Bidar in 1427 and built his fort along with a number of Islamic monuments. There are over 30 monuments inside Bidar fort.

The complex was placed by UNESCO on its "tentative list" to become a World Heritage Site in 2014, with others in the region, under the name Monuments and Forts of the Deccan Sultanate. The Bidar Fort has witnessed many historical milestones – the rise and fall of Bahmani dynasty, rise and separation of the five Deccan Sultans, capture by the Barid Shahi and Adil Shahi dynasties, and finally being won by the Mughal emperor Aurangzeb in the blockade of Bidar in 1657.

Bidar was the capital of the Bahmani Kingdom in the 14th century. This fort was built by Ahmed Shah Wali Bahmani. The Fort was renovated in the 15th century by Sultan Ahmad Shah-I as he shifted his capital from Kalaburagi (Gulbarga) to Bidar.

== Geography ==
Bidar city and fort are located on the edge of the Bidar plateau, the northernmost in Karnataka state. The plateau area, comprising low laterite hills, ends to the north at the Manjira River, a major tributary of the Godavari River. The Karanja River, a sub-tributary, drains the surrounding low-lying areas and feeds into the Manjiri River. Bidar district comprises the only part of the Godavari basin in Karnataka.

Geologically, Bidar district is predominantly Deccan Trap with underlying layers of gneiss emerging along the eastern boundary. The plateau has an altitude of 2,200 feet (670 m), and measures 22 miles (35 km) in length and 12 miles (19 km) in width at its broadest. The plateau encompasses a total area of 190 square kilometres (73 mi^{2}). Bidar Fort is built in the form of an irregular rhombus on the edge of the plateau with sheer walls built along the north and the east.

The ancient capital Kalyani (Basavakalyan) of the Western Chalukya Empire is situated about 40 miles (64 km) to the west of Bidar.

== History ==
Bidar fort was built by Ahmed Shah Wali Bahmani; the exact layout of the old fort, with its double lines of defensive fortifications, is no longer discernible. Folklore suggests that the old fort was located in the western portion of the fort's present-day extent, from the Takht Mahal to the Kalmadi gate and the promontory on which Virasangayya's temple was built, with the old water tank at the base of its walls. This is confirmed in historical record in Tarikh-i Firishta, by the Persian scholar Firishta (1560-1620 CE), which states that the Government House or Darul Imara, today known as Takht Mahal, was built on the site of the old fort.

The old fort of Bidar was captured from the Kakatiya dynasty in 1321-22 AD by Prince Ulugh Khan of the Tughlaq dynasty, who later became Sultan Muhammad bin Tughluq of Delhi.

With the establishment of the Bahmani Sultanate (1347), Bidar was occupied by Sultan Ala-ud-Din Bahman Shah. During the rule of Ahmad Shah I (1422–1436), Bidar was made the capital city of Bahmani Kingdom. Under Ahmed Shah's rule, the old Fort was rebuilt, and beautiful madrasas, mosques, palaces and gardens were raised. Firishta records that the reconstruction began in 1429 CE and ended in 1432 CE. As gunpowder had not yet been introduced into peninsular India, long and winding fort walls were constructed out of stone and mortar by Persian and Turkish architects, the stone being provided from the moat, which was excavated by local masons.

Bidar fort was captured by the independent Bijapur Sultanate in 1619–20 but fell to then Mughal viceroy Aurangzeb in 1657, and was formally absorbed by the Mughal Empire in 1686. In 1724, Bidar became a part of the Asaf Jahi Kingdom of the Nizams. Nawab Mir Sa'id Muhammad Khan (also known as Salabath Jung), who was the third son of Asaf Jah I (the first Nizam of the dynasty), ruled from Bidar fort from 1751 to 1762, until his brother Mir Nizam Ali Khan, also known as Asaf Jah II, imprisoned him and later killed him in the fort on 16 September 1763. The old name for Bidar, "Mohammedabad" refers to the rule of Salabath Jung.

During the rule of the Nizams, almost all the palaces within the fort were used to house government offices, and one was used as a jail. After the formation of the archeological department, the fort was restored and the government offices removed. In 1956, when the state of Hyderabad was partitioned, Bidar fort became part of the newly formed Mysore state (now in Karnataka).

== Architecture ==
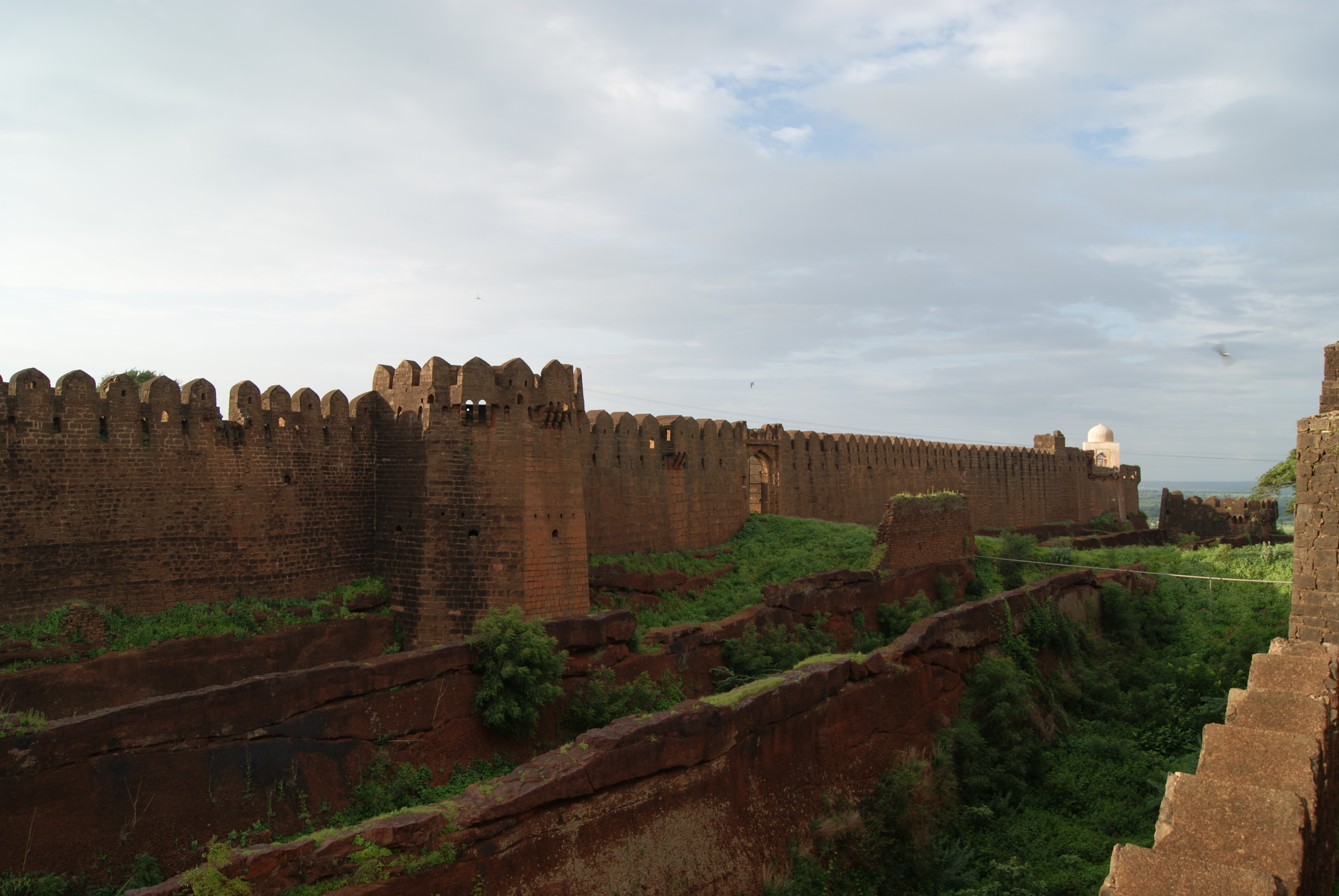
The triple moat of Bidar fort.

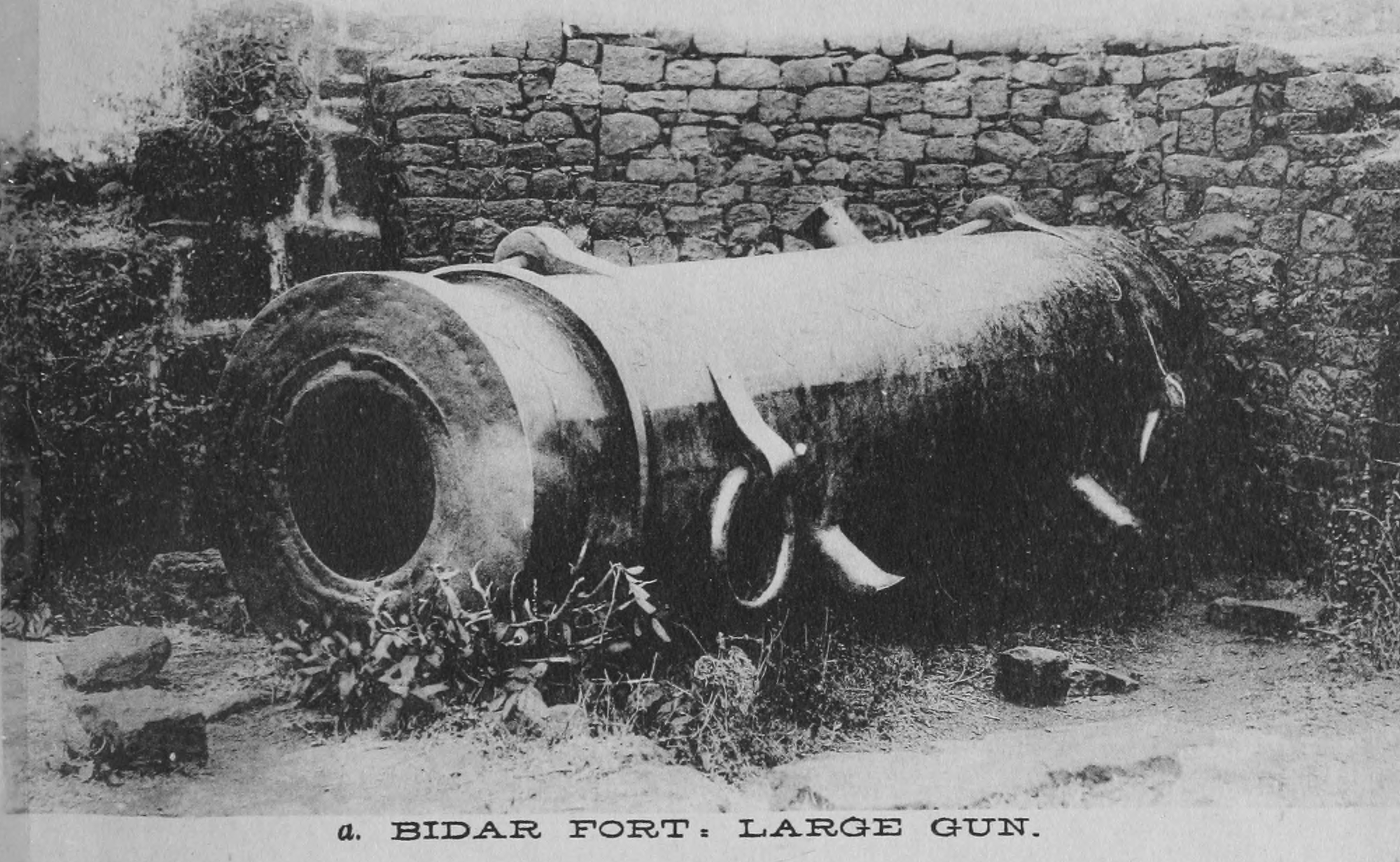
Large cannon in Bidar fort circa 1917

The present-day Bidar fortress was rebuilt using red laterite stone around the old fort in 1428 by Ahmed Shah Bahmani. Constructed on the edge of the plateau, Bidar fort has a haphazard rhombus-shaped layout. The fort is 0.75 mi (1.21 km) long by 0.5 mi (0.80 km) in breadth. The fort walls measure 2.5 km (1.6 mi) on the outside, and include within numerous buildings, arches, pavilions, mosques, gateways and gardens. To the north and east, steep cliffs provide natural protection to the moat and the glacis; elsewhere, facing Bidar city, from the south-east to the south-west, the walls are protected by a unique triple-channeled moat, described by Yazdani (1995) as follows:

The width of the moat between the glacis and the first partition wall is 32 feet 6 inches [9.91 m], between the first and second partition-walls 36 feet 4 inches, and between the second partition wall and the scarp 41 feet 9 inches [12.73 m]. The depth of the moat is 30 feet, and the height of the scarp above the rock-base on which it is built varies from 32 feet 8 inches to 43 feet [13 m].

=== Gates ===
The seven gates of the fort are named from East to West as follows:

- Gate 1 - The Mandu Darwaza, the main gate
- Gate 2 - The Kalmadgi Darwaza,
- Gate 5 - The Delhi Darwaza,
- Gate 6 - The Kalyani Darwaza,
- Gate 7 - The Carnatic Darwaza,
- Gates 3 and 4 are without a name.

There are 37 bastions on the fort wall, with cannon made of bars of metal welded together and held together by metal hoops were mounted on the bastions. The Munda Burj is the most prominent bastion, and the heaviest guns were placed here to dominate the approaches.

Bidar fort has a number of monuments within the fortress complex. Prominent amongst them are the Rangin Mahal ("Painted Palace"), so called because of its elaborate decoration with coloured tiles; the Takht Mahal, or throne room; the Jami Masjid ("Great Mosque") and the Sola Khamba Masjid ("Sixteen-Pillar" mosque).

With the establishment of the Bahmani Kingdom in the Deccan from 1347, the architectural styles of the Persian architecture of Iran made impressive and lasting impacts, which are seen in the Bidar Fort. The mosques, arches, gardens and the palaces were built within and also outside the fort in the Bidar city. Some of the important structures built are elaborated. Innovative systems of water management are seen in and around the fort and city of Bidar. The influence of Persian culture was distinct in Bidar in the Deccan, during the 15th and 16th centuries.

=== Rangin Mahal ===
Rangin Mahal (lit. coloured palace) was named for its walls which were decorated with coloured tiles.

=== Diwan-i-Aam ===
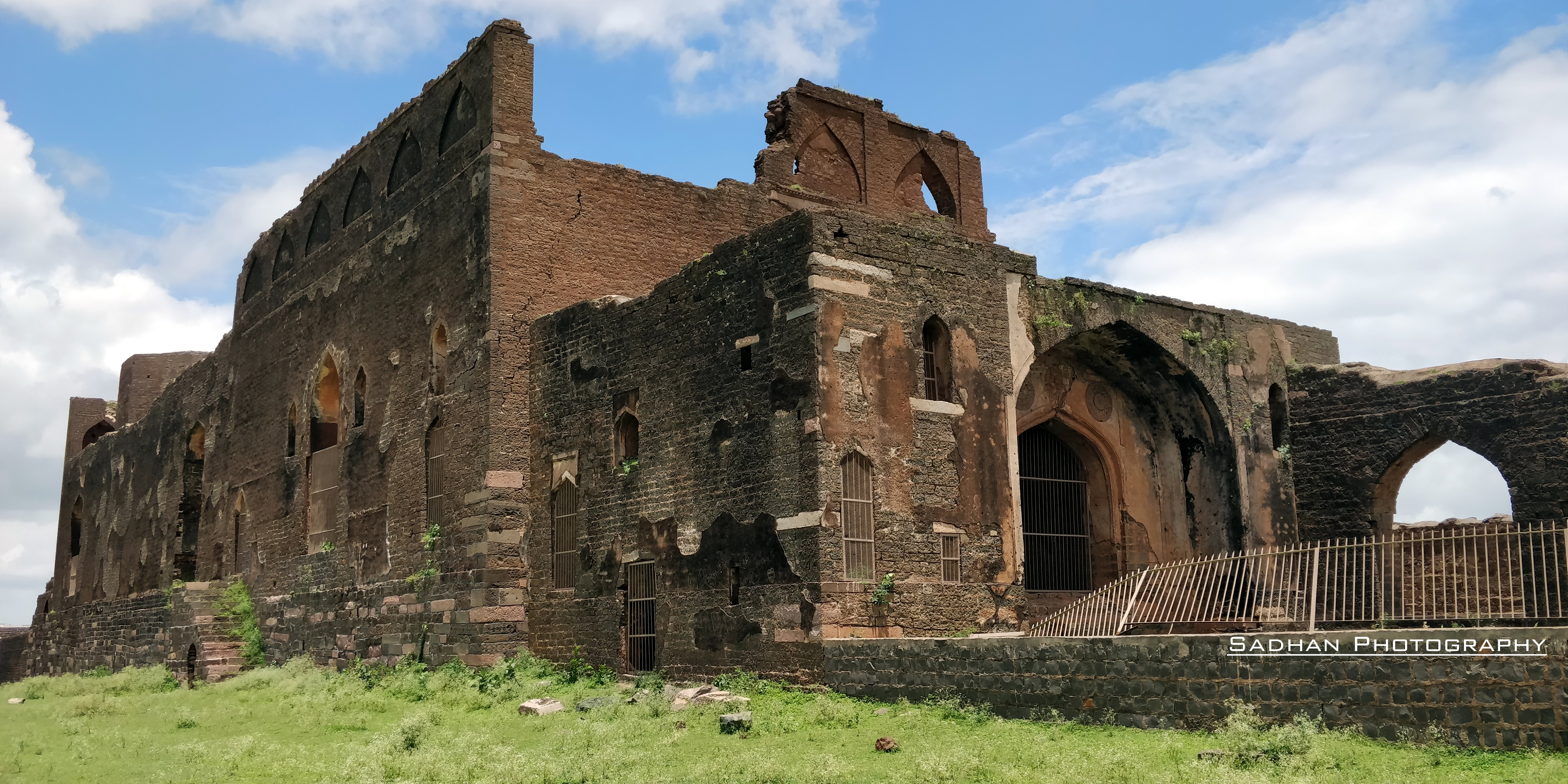
Diwan-i-Aam

The principle hall, presumably used for public audience, is located at the southern side. The hall contains three rows of six pillars each. It has entrances on the eastern and western sides.

=== Solah Khamba mosque ===
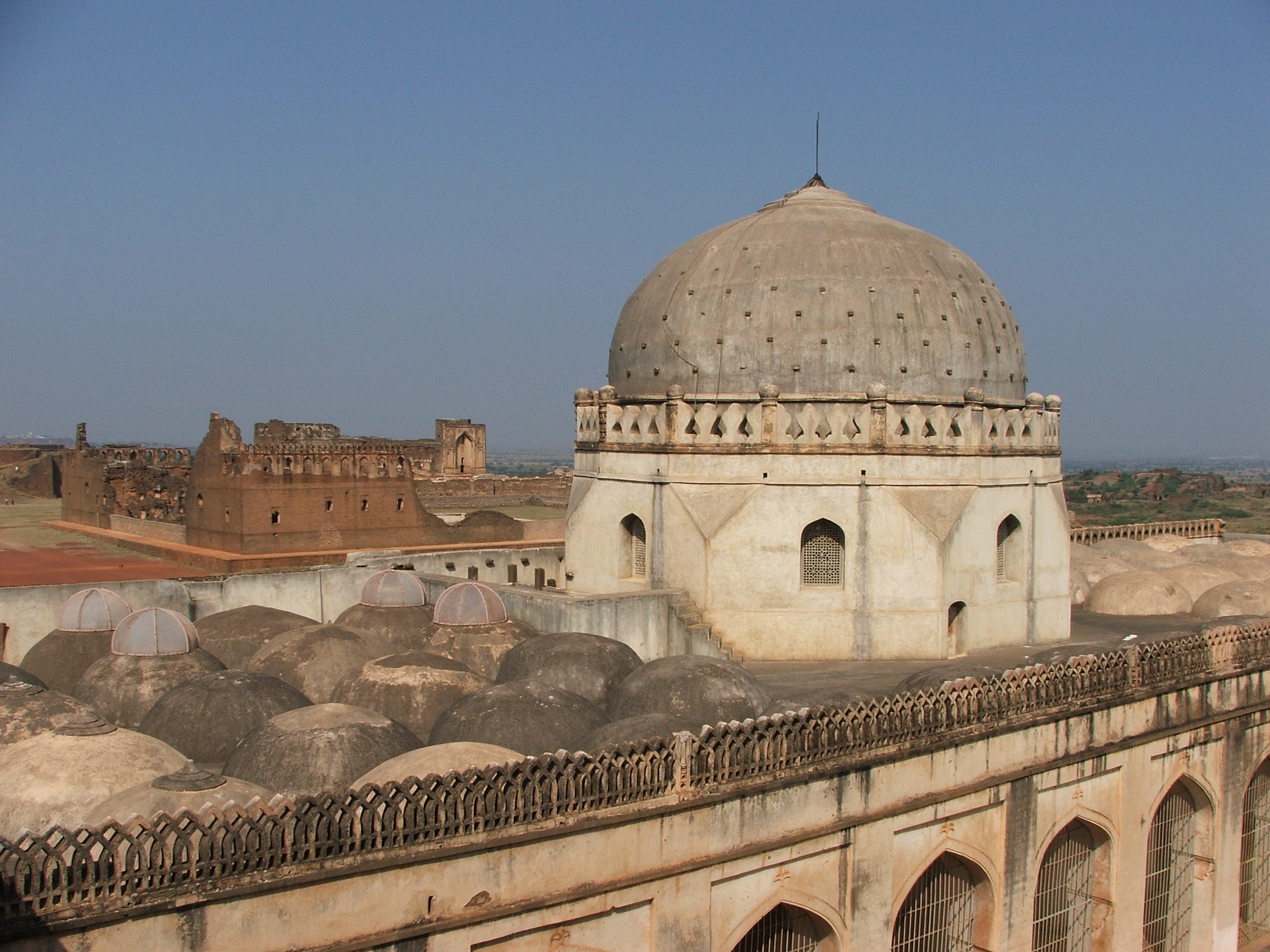
Solah Khamba Mosque

The Solah Khamba mosque was originally the congregational mosque of Bidar. An arcade of nineteen uniform arches forms the facade of the mosque. A parapet wall rises above the mosque. It is surmounted with a massive dome. Several smaller domes on the roof of the mosque remain hidden when viewed from below, due to the parapet wall.

=== Karez water supply system ===
One of the most unusual features of Bidar is the historic water supply system, called karez, (also known as qanat), which is a water harnessing technology that originated in Persia.

The technology was brought to the Deccan by the Bahmani kings of the 15th century CE, the karez system was built by Bahmani kings in the 15th century in Naubad village in Bidar, in Gulbarga and Bijapur districts in Karnataka and also in Burhanpur district in Madhya Pradesh.

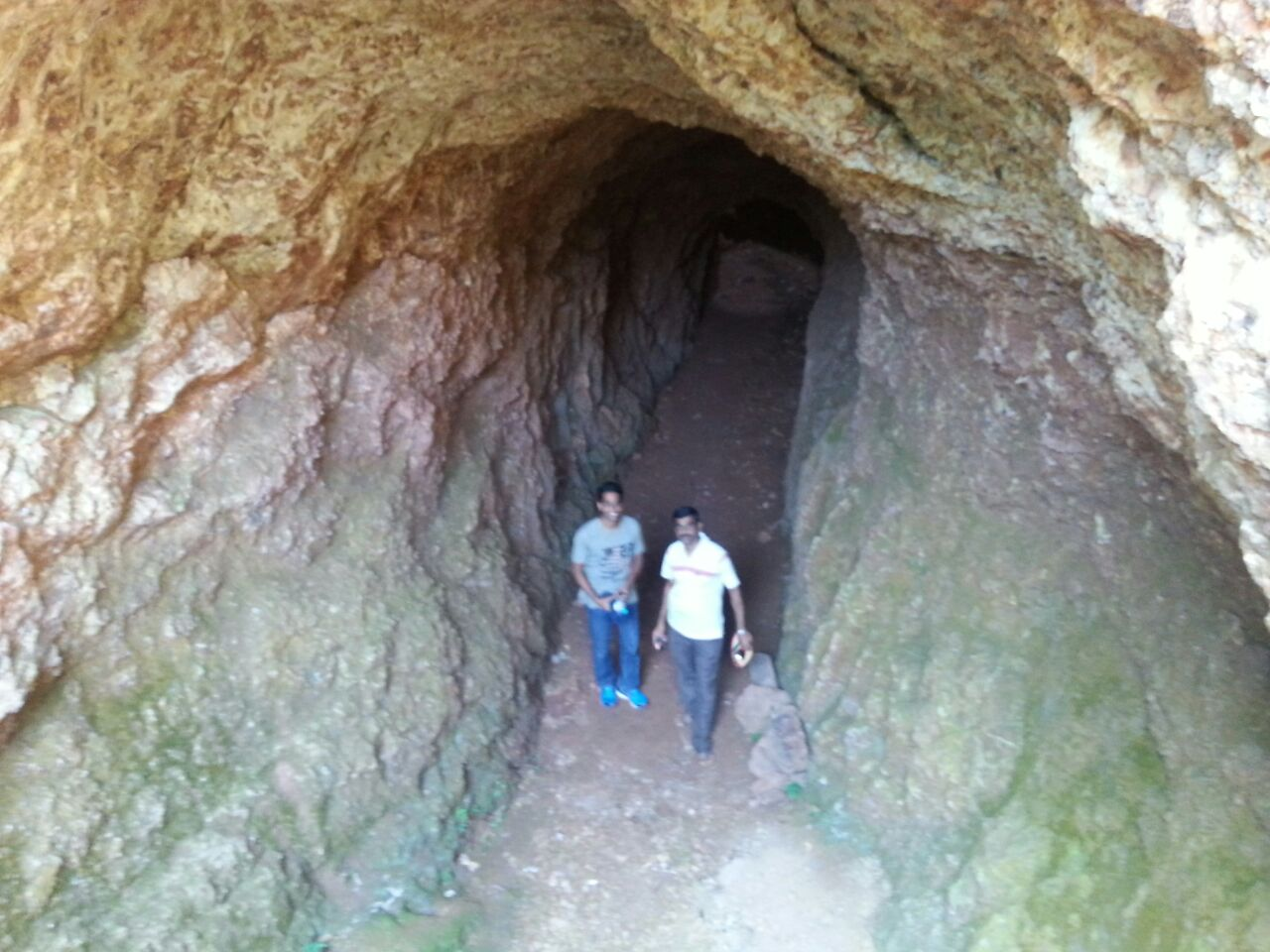
Entrance to the Karez system in Bidar

The karez consists basically of a network underground canals, punctuated by vertical shafts to the surface, The karez taps into the groundwater sources (or natural springs) and transports it through the tunnel to the settlement, ending in a surface canal and/or pools in the village for various uses like drinking, washing, ablution, watering livestock, and also further used for irrigating fields, orchards and gardens.

The rocky soil in Bidar makes access to drinking water very difficult and the karez was built in order to provide drinking water to civilian settlements and the garrison inside the Bidar fort. The system in Bidar has 21 vertical shafts, and extends for about 2 kilometres (1.2 mi). A few karez shafts have been closed by builders and developers, leaving only 17 visible today.

== Gallery ==
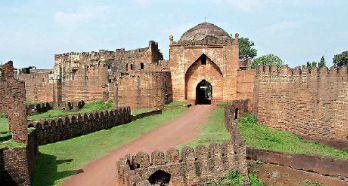
Bidar Fort near the entrance.

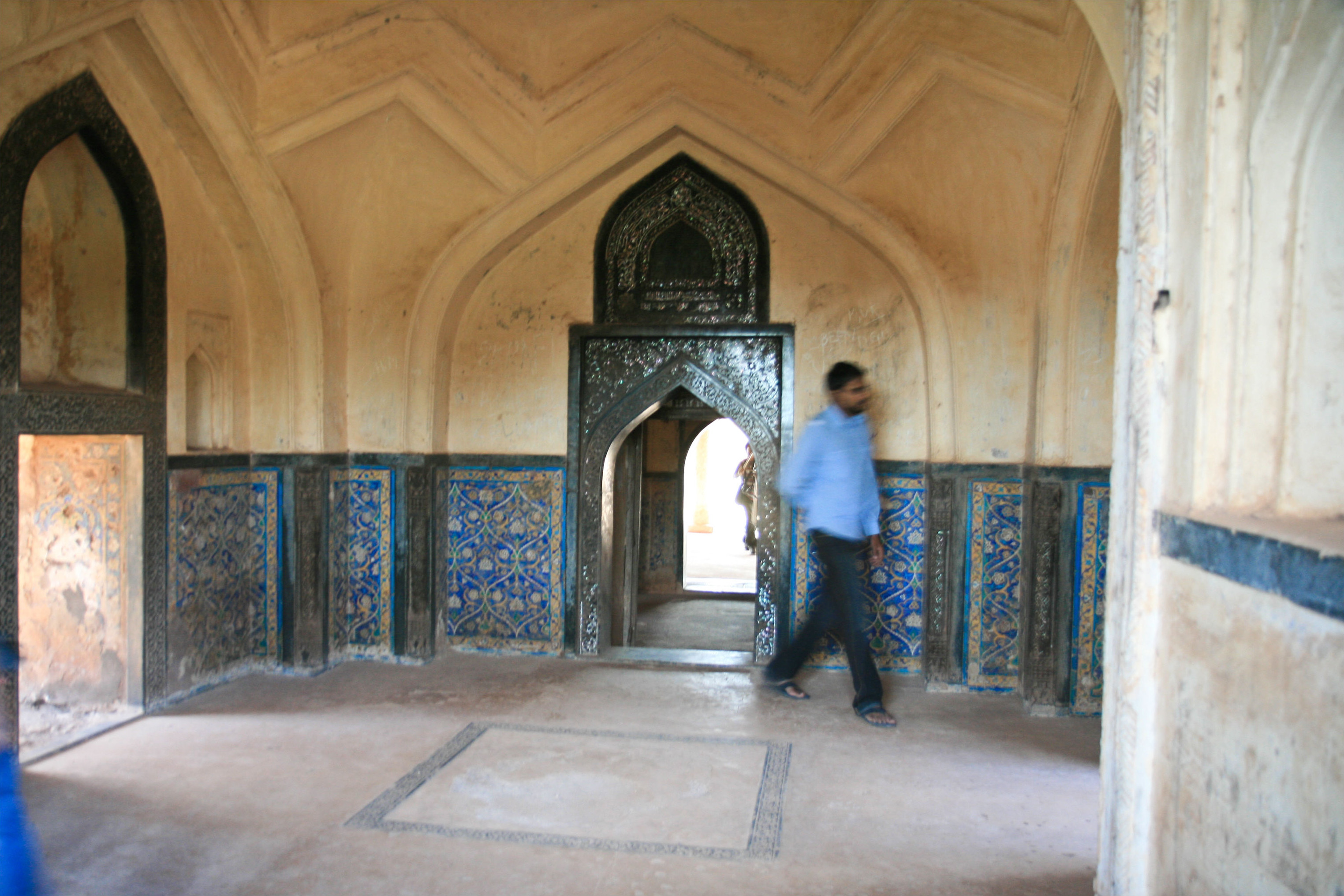
Rangeen Mahal

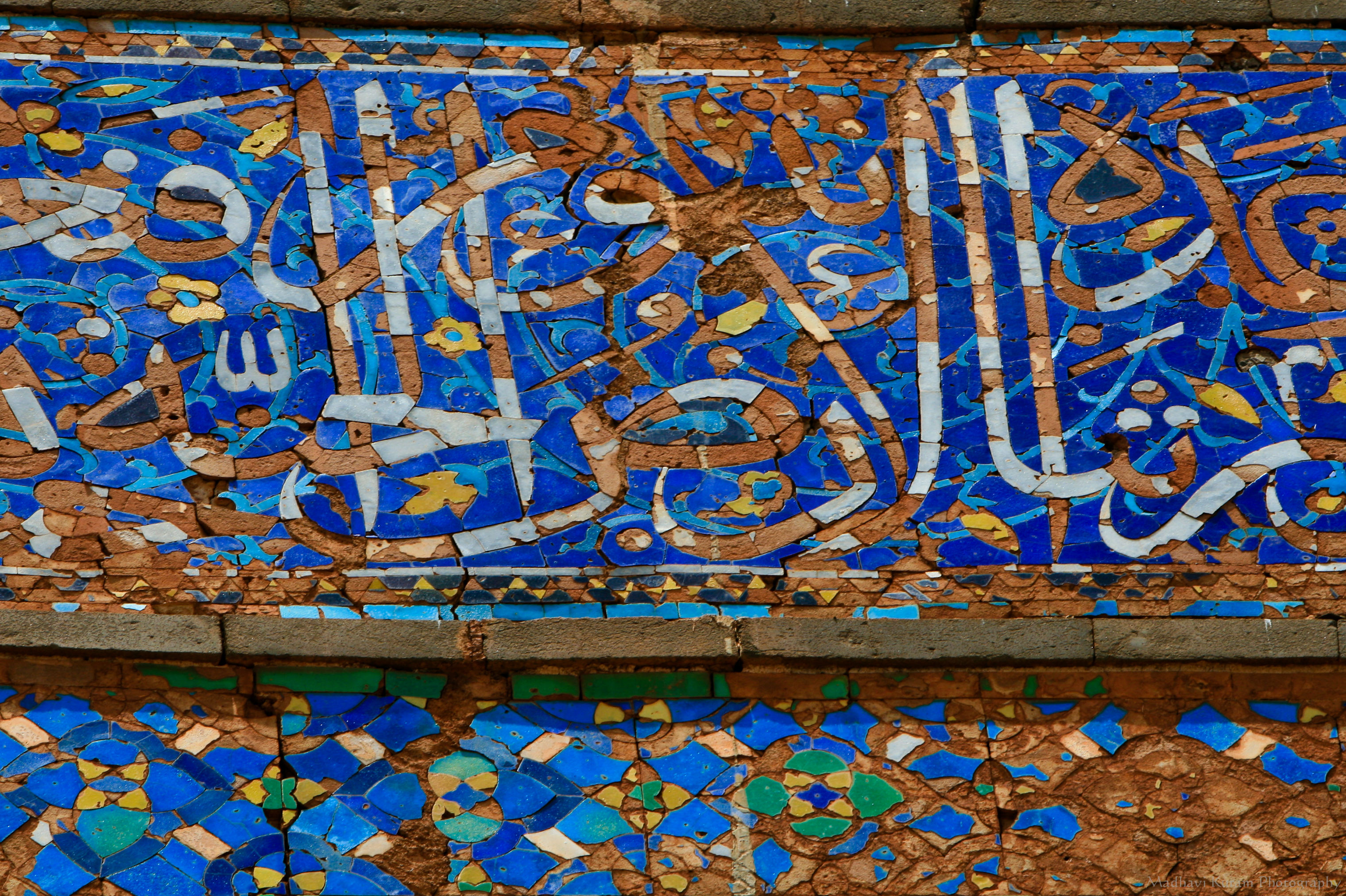
Frescoed Arabic calligraphy

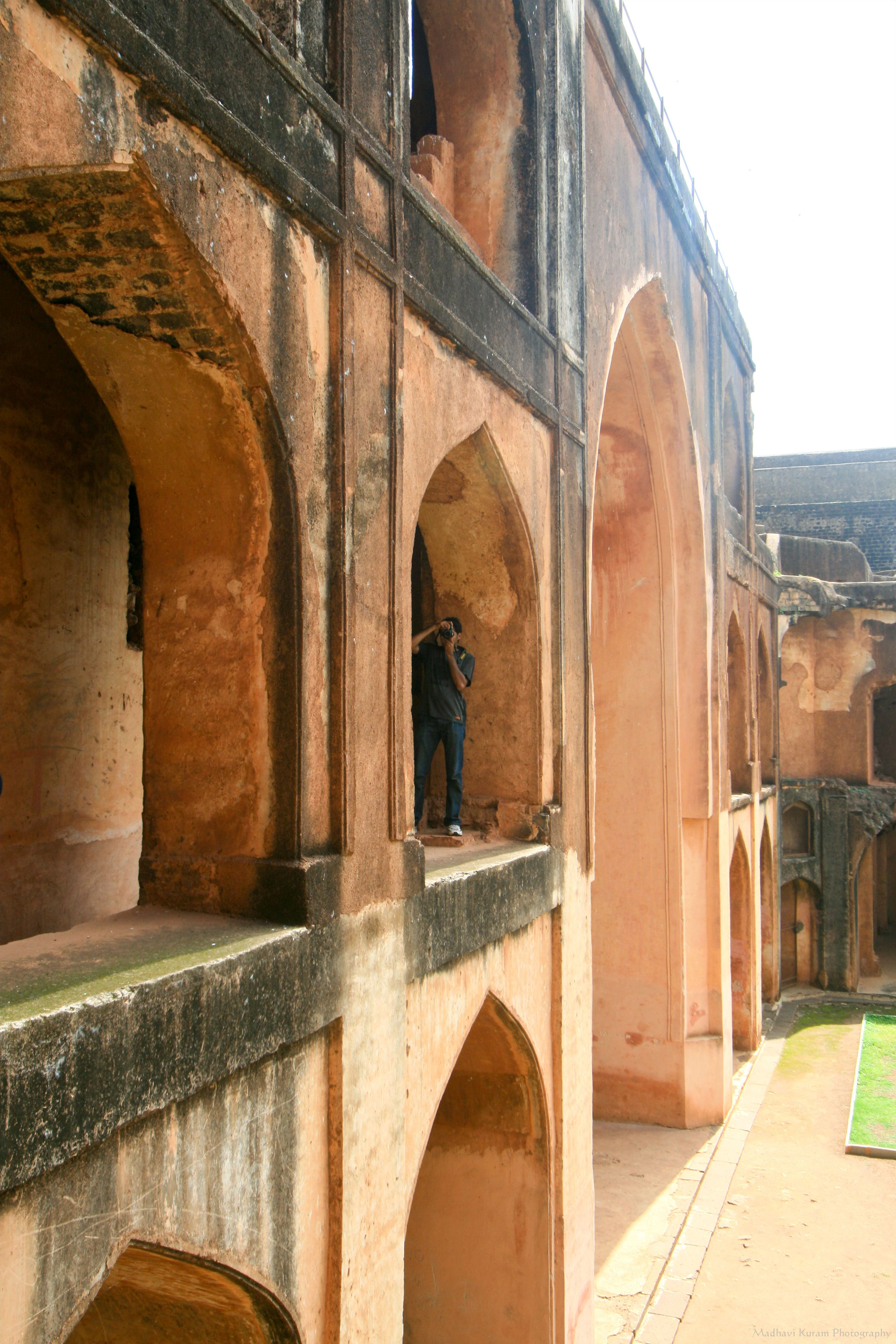
Archways in the fort

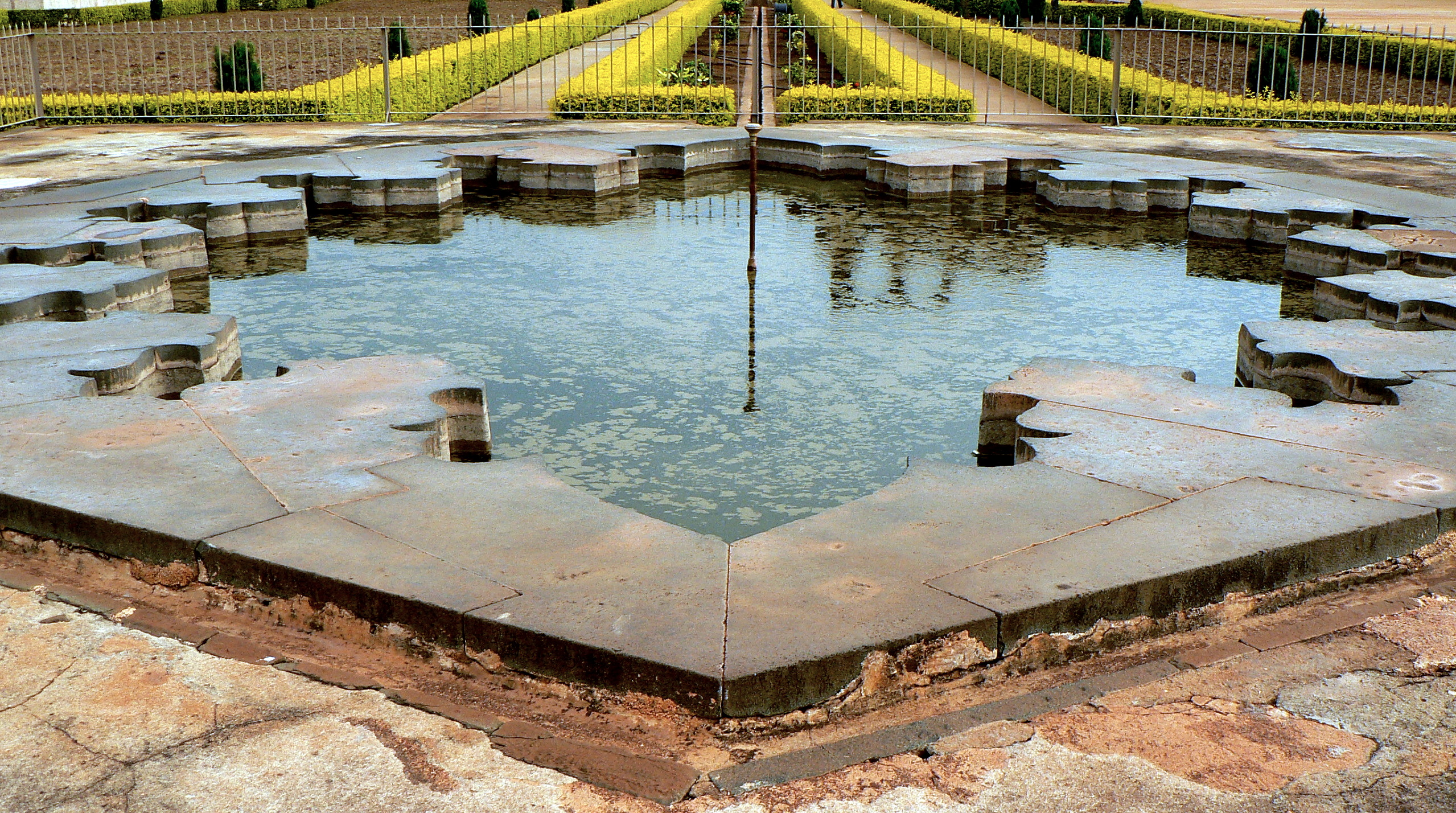
fountains at the entrance

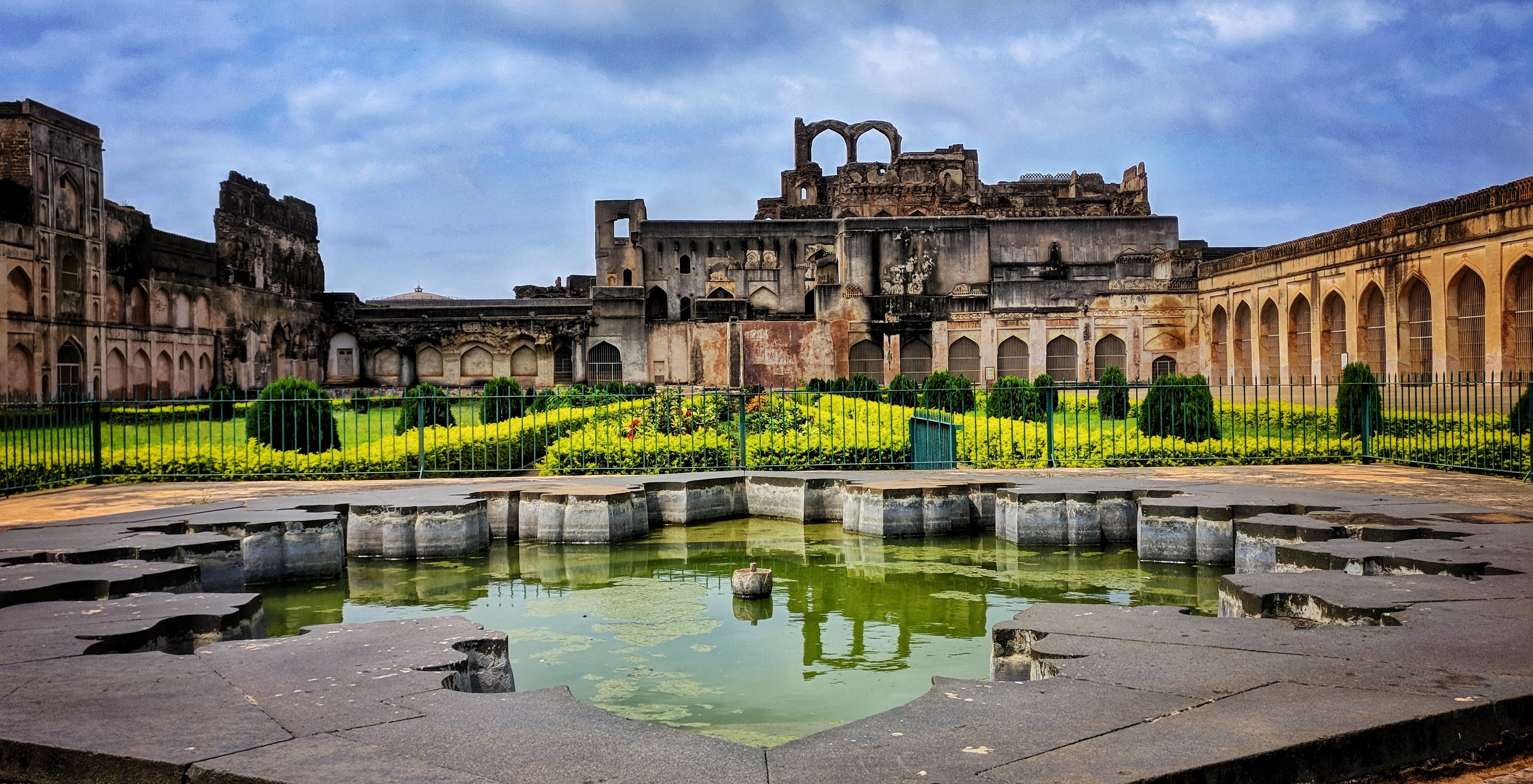
Lal Bagh & Tarkash Mahal view

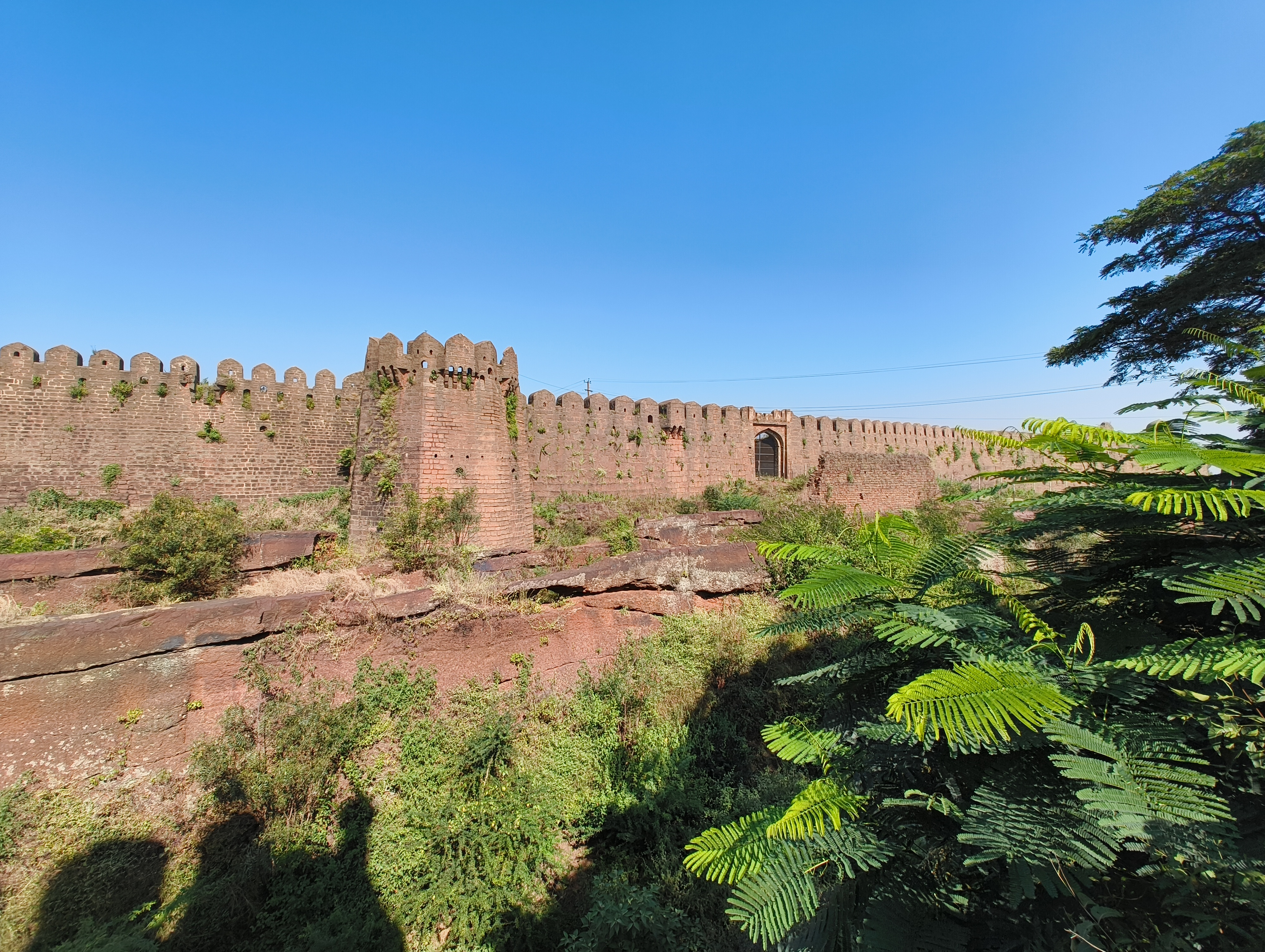
Fortification and moat (Khandak)

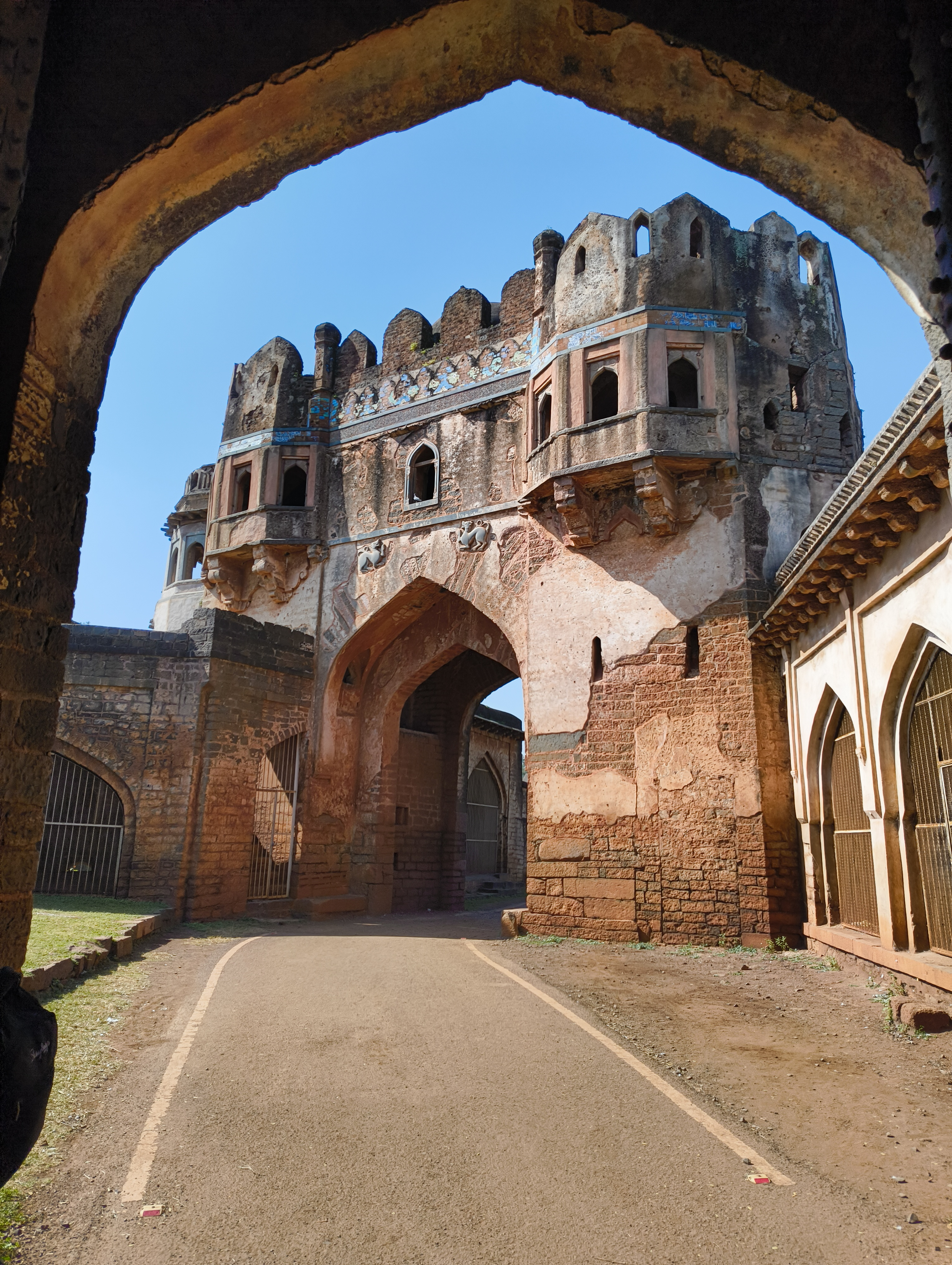
Sherja Darwaza

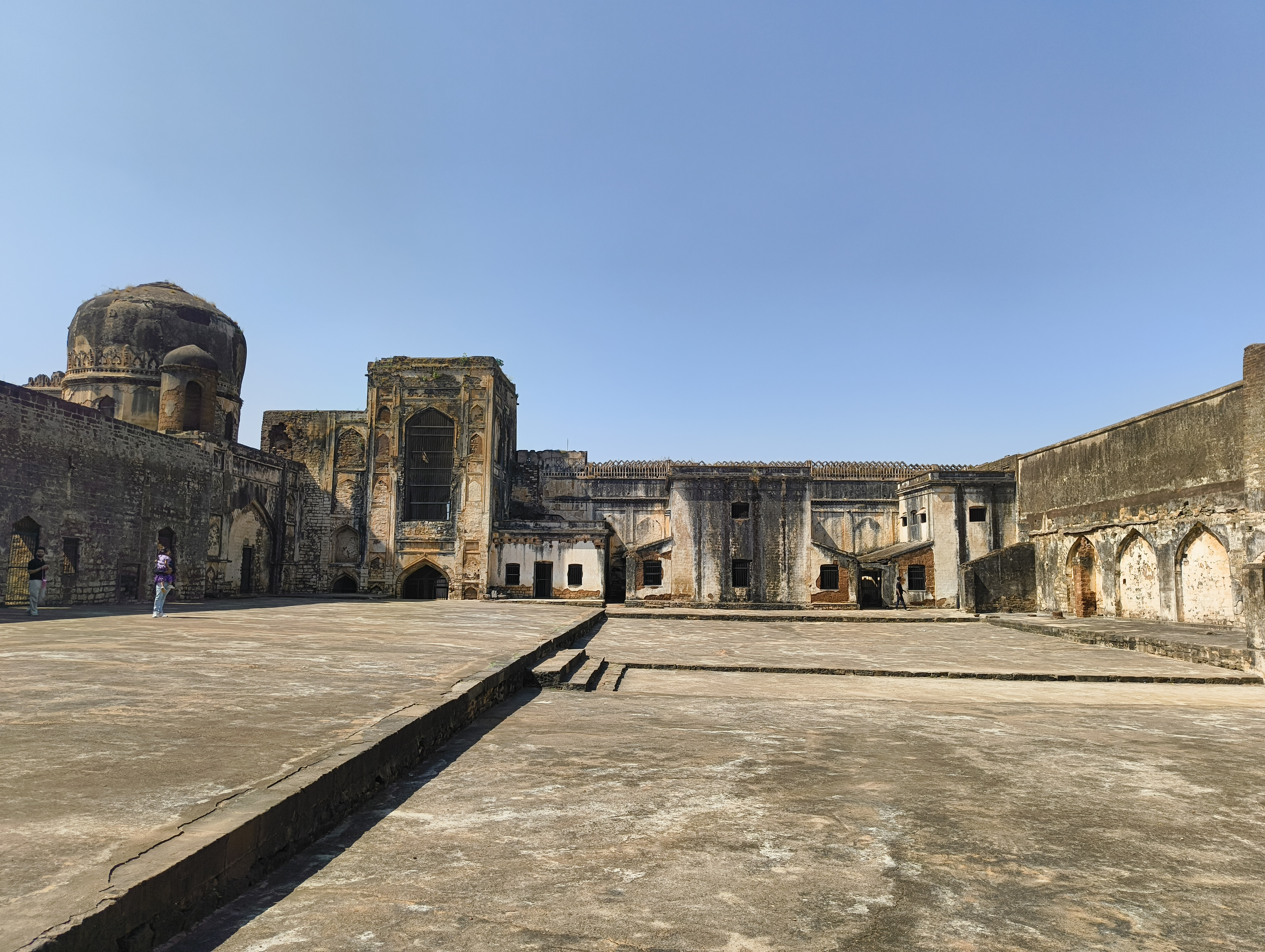
Hazar Kothri

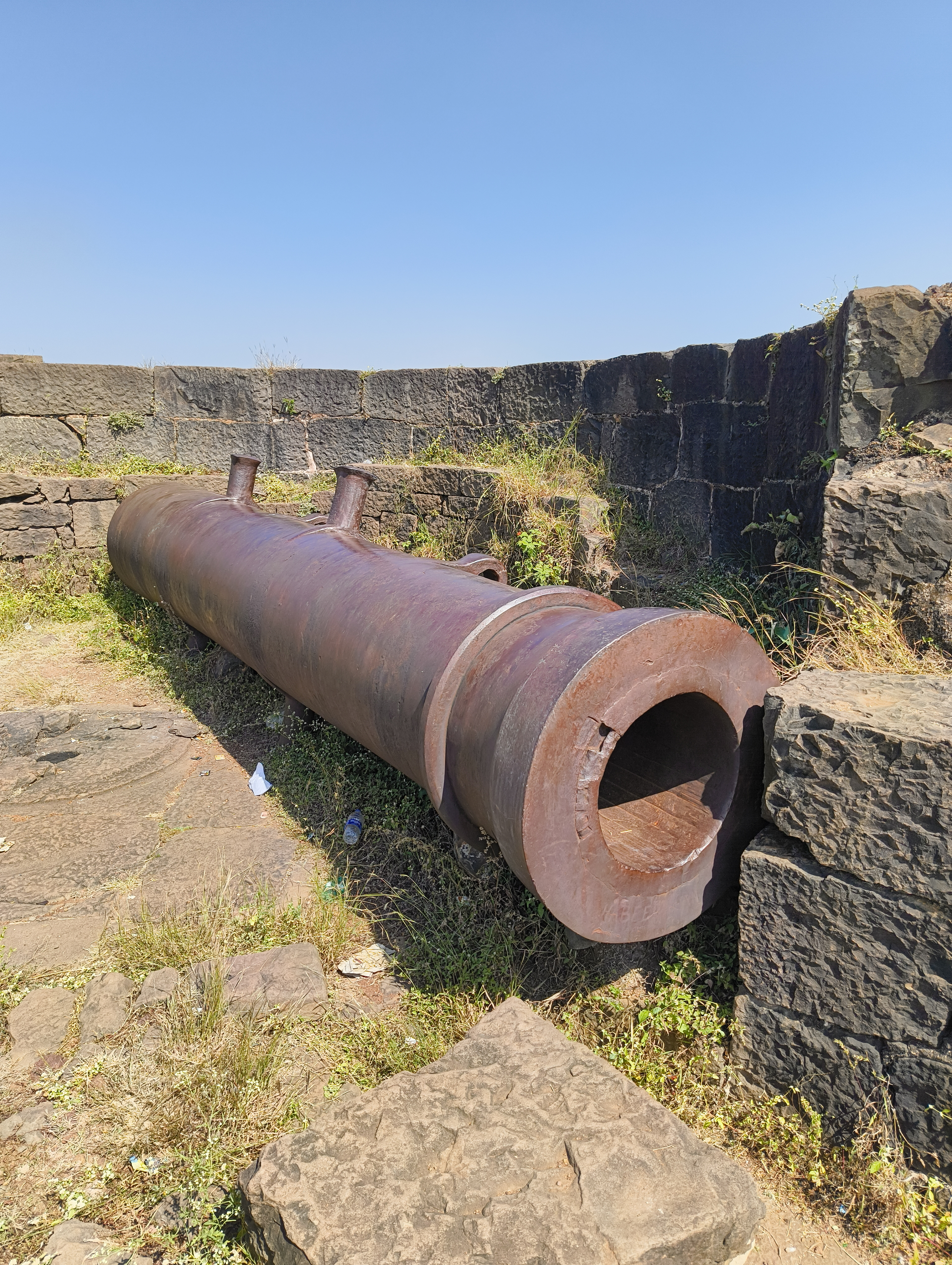
Cannon at west bastion

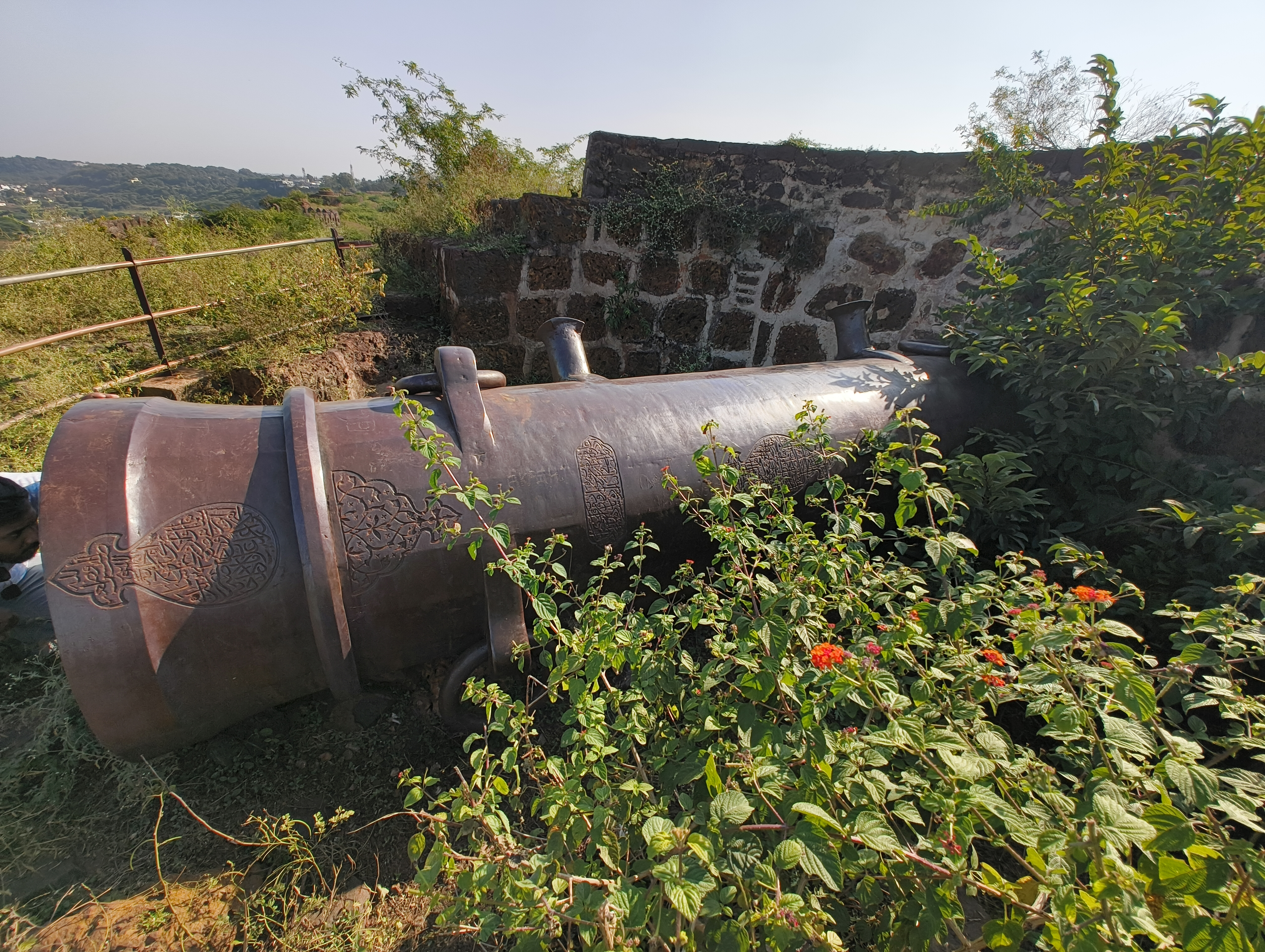
Cannon at north bastion

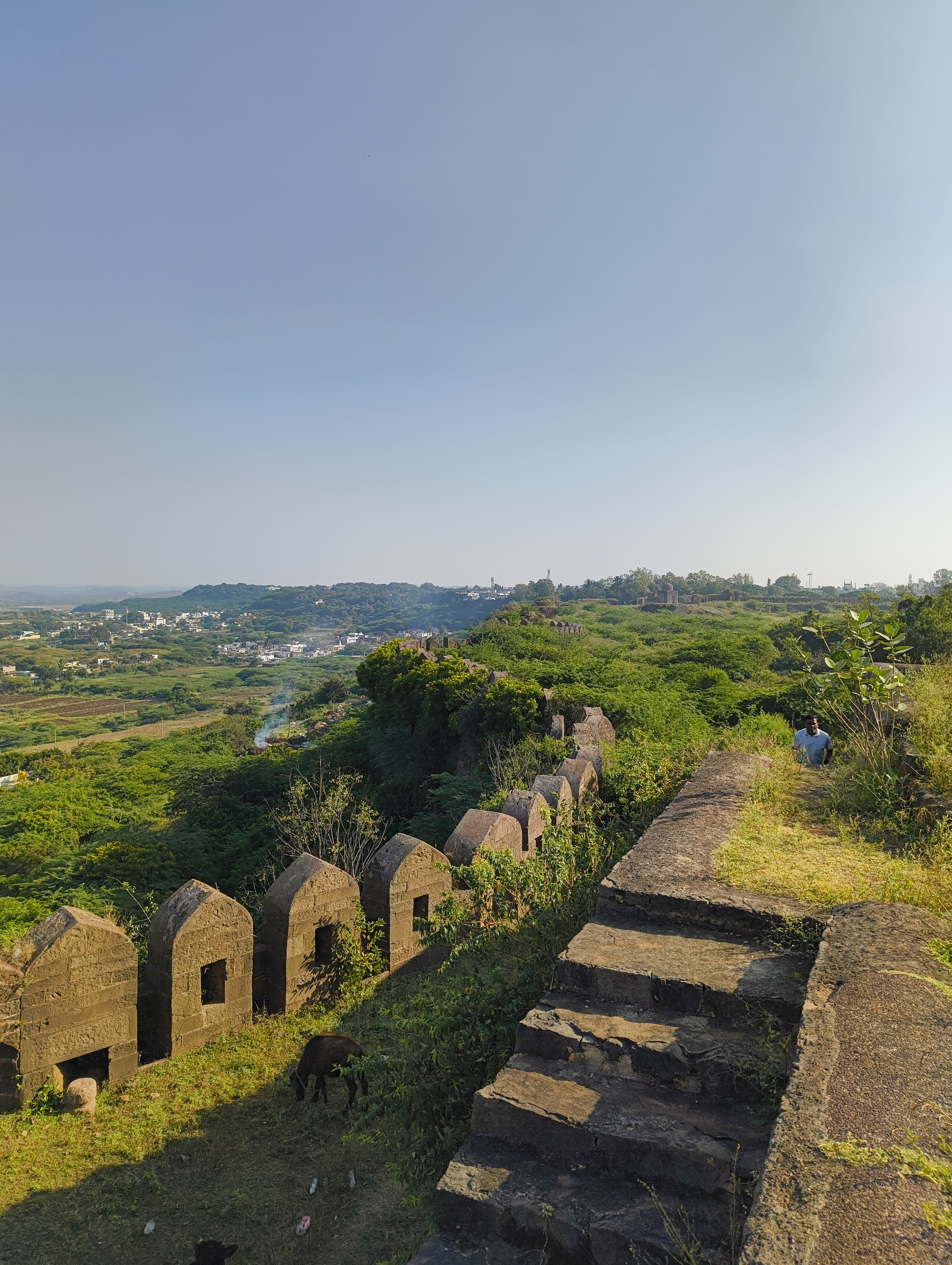
East side fortification

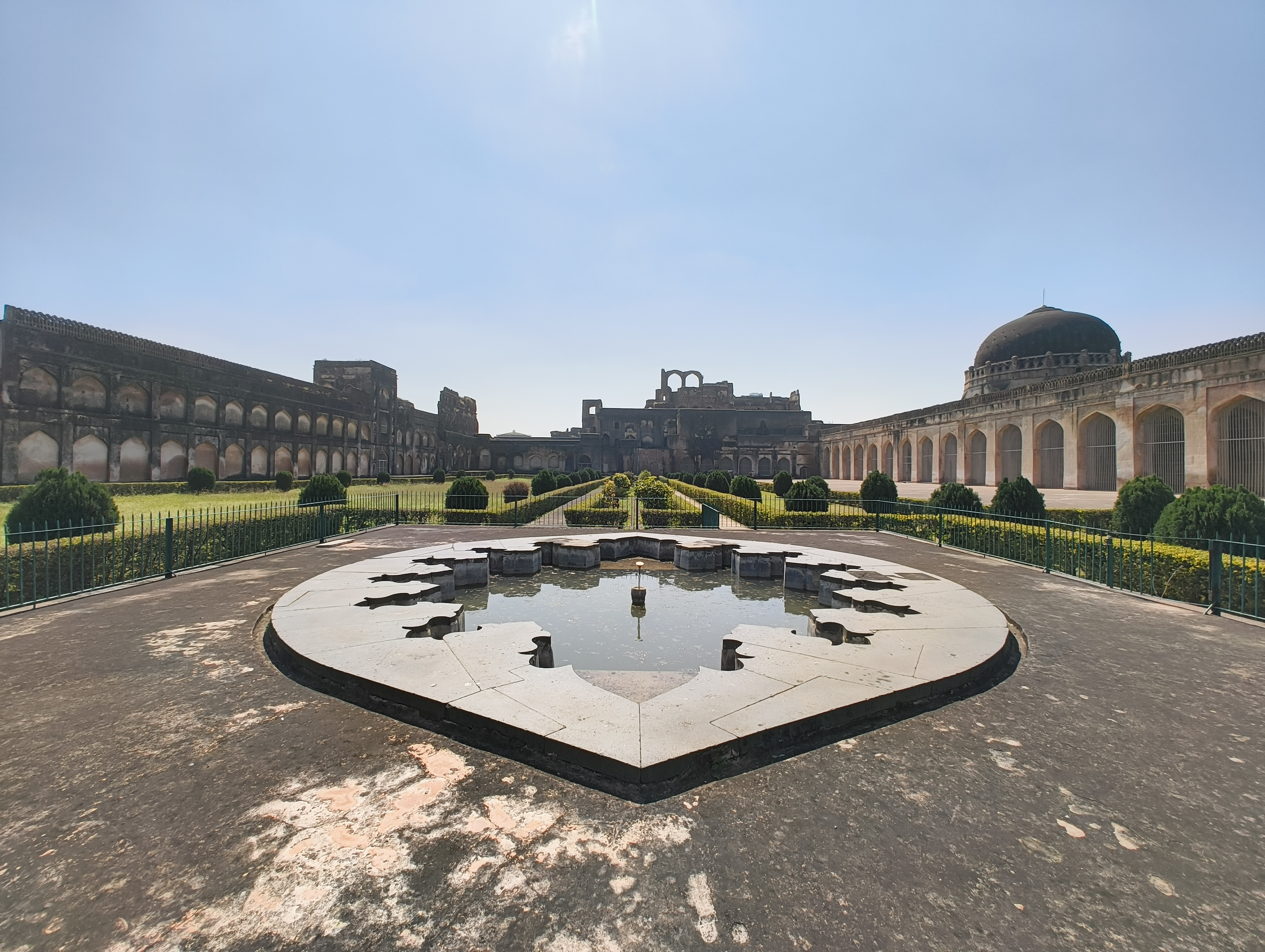
Lal Bagh of Bidar Fort

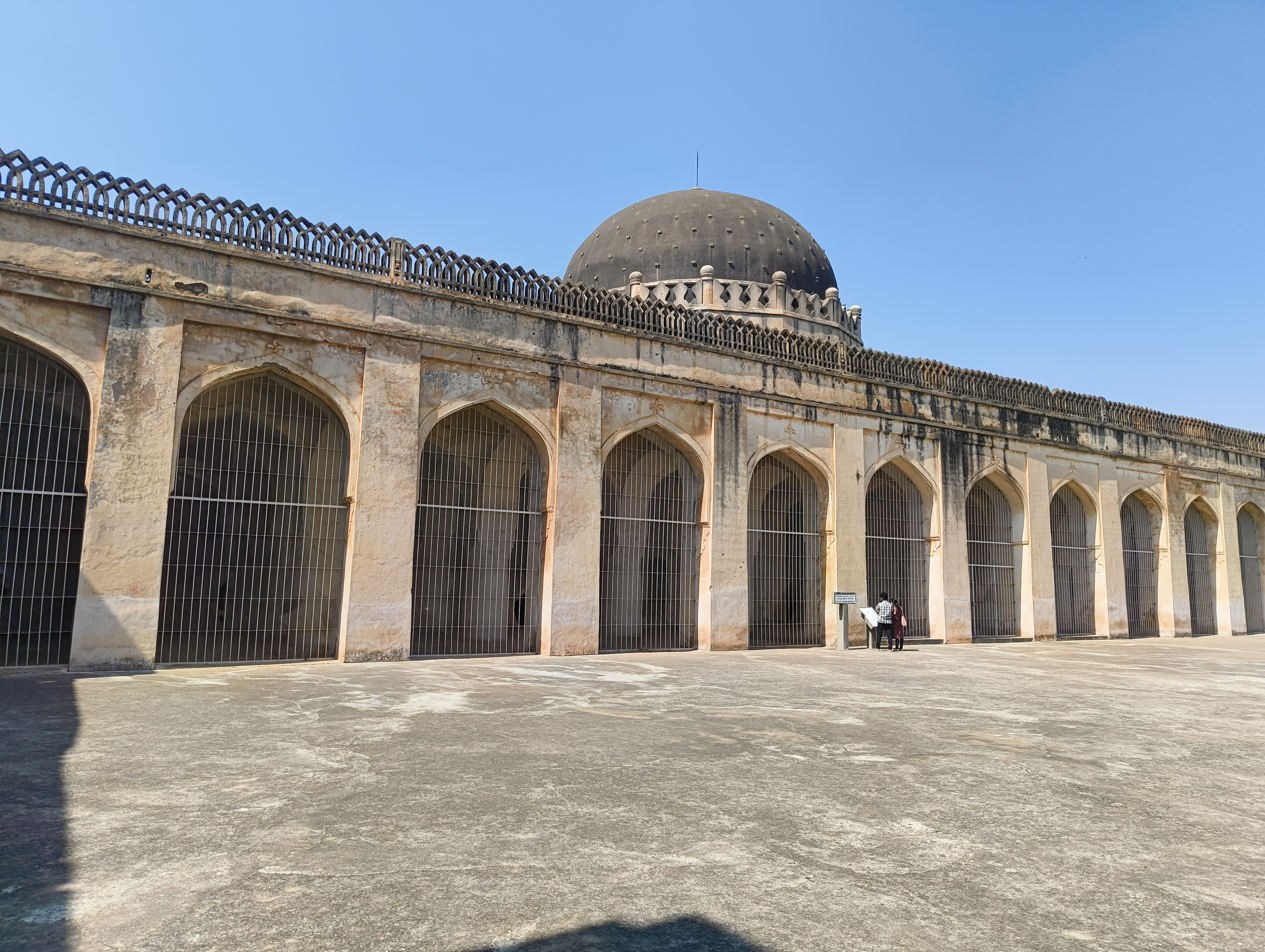
Solah Khamba Mosque

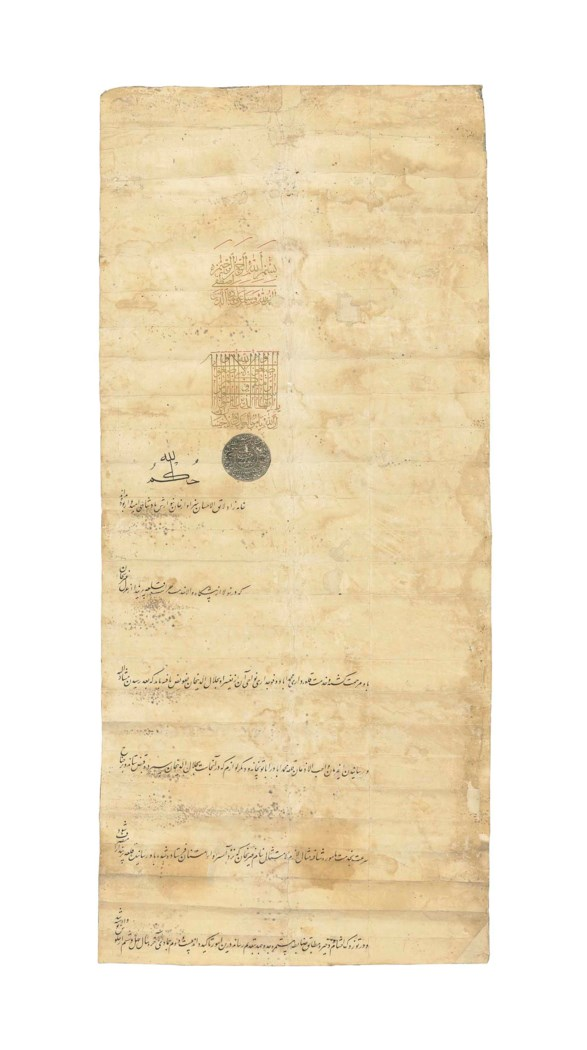
A farman (royal decree) from the reign of Mughal emperor Aurangzeb c. 1702, transferring command of Bidar's fort from Ghairat Khan to Jalal al-Din Khan

== Access ==
Bidar is well connected by road, rail and air links. Bidar city is situated about 740 km (460 mi) north of Bangalore India on NH 7, 116 km (72 mi) northeast of Gulbarga and 130 km (81 mi) on NH 9 from Hyderabad.

Though the nearest airfield is in Bidar itself, it is an air force station and flight access . The nearest commercial airports are Bidar Airport and Rajiv Gandhi International Airport, in Hyderabad.

== In popular culture ==
Parts of Kannada cinema Bara were shot at Bidar Fort, while most of the movie was shot at Bidar and surrounding places. The song "Ishq Sufiyaana" from the hit Bollywood film of 2011, The Dirty Picture was shot in the Bidar Fort. The song had sequences in the fort with Vidya Balan and Emraan Hashmi.

== See also ==
- Bidar Sultanate
- Forts of Karnataka
- Raichur Fort
- Gulbarga Fort
- Bellary Fort
- Basavakalyana Fort
- Mudgal Fort
- Golconda Fort
- Deccan sultanates
