= Solah Khamba Mosque =

Mosque in Bidar, Karnataka, India

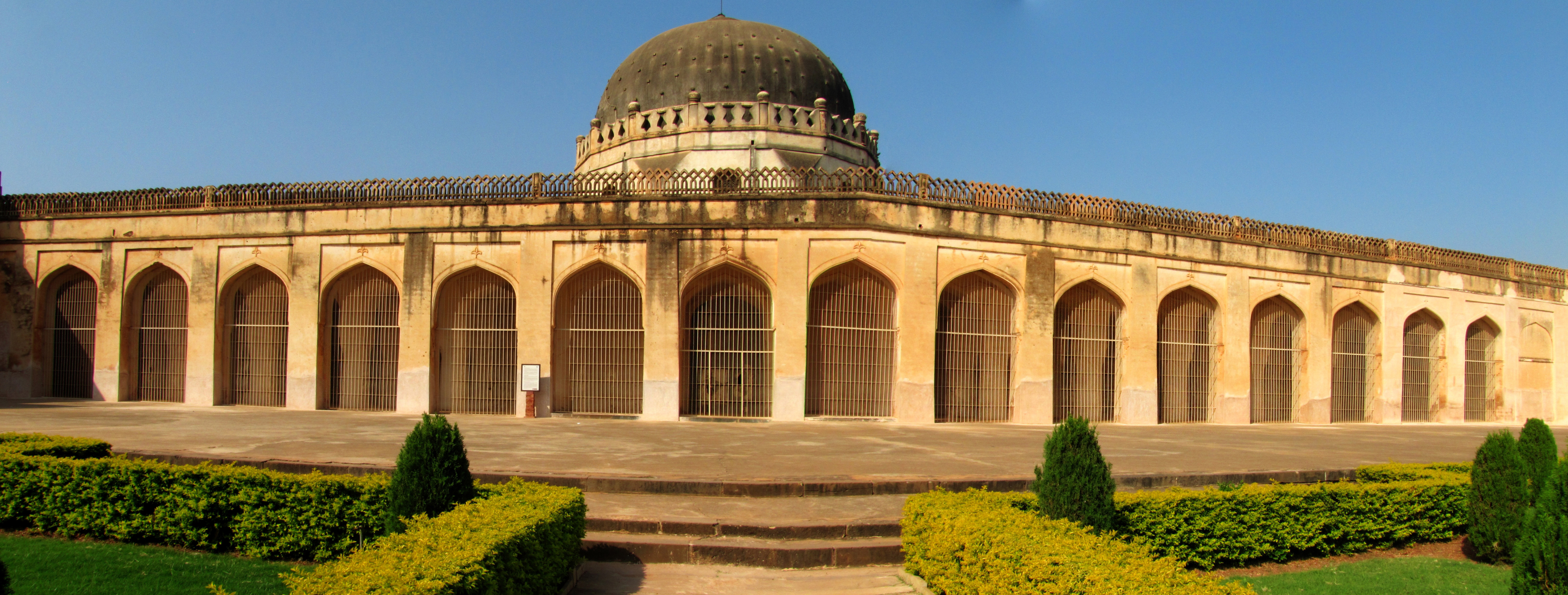
- A wide-angle view of the façade, showing 15 of the 16 arches, in 2015

- Location of the mosque in Karnataka

Religion
- Affiliation: Islam
- Ecclesiastical or organizational status: Mosque
- Status: Active

Location
- Location: Bidar Fort, Bidar, Karnataka
- Country: India
- Interactive map of Solah Khamba Mosque
- Coordinates: 17°55′15″N 77°31′41″E

Architecture
- Type: Mosque architecture
- Style: Indo-Islamic; Deccan
- Founder: Bahmani Sultanate
- Completed: 827 AH (1423/1424 CE)
- Dome: 41 (estimate)

The Solah Khamba Mosque is a mosque within the Bidar Fort in Bidar, in the state of Karnataka, India.

== Background ==
The original name of the building is not known. It has been described as the Zanani Masjid (mosque of the zenana) owing to its presence in the women's enclosure. The name Solah Khamba (sixteen pillars) refers to the presence of sixteen columns in the middle of the hall.

The building has been traditionally considered to be the congregational mosque of Bidar. However, Helen Philon argues that the building was intended to be a royal ceremonial hall, rather than a congregational mosque. She claims that the mosque is located well within Bidar Fort, and would not have been accessible to the general public.

== Architecture ==
An inscription, written in Arabic, found during the clearing of debris from a decayed part of the building reads, when translated into English:

During the time of the viceregent of God; Prince Muhammad, who has no equal; 'In 827 AH (1423/1424 CE) Qubli Sultani was the auspicious founder of this mosque.’

The eastern façade is 94 metres (310 ft) wide. An arcade of nineteen uniform arches forms the façade of the mosque. The span of each of the arches is approximately 3.45 metres (11 ft 4 in), and their height approximately 6.1 metres (20 ft). A parapet wall rises above the mosque, considered to be a later addition. The mosque is well known for the symmetry of its arches, its clerestory windows with perforated geometrical screens, completed in the Deccan style.

The mosque is surmounted with a massive dome. The dome rests on a circular drum, with trefoil crenellations in relief. The prayer hall measures 89.84 metres (294 ft 9 in) long, and 24 metres (80 ft) wide. It is divided into ninety-five bays by means of nineteen aisles, each five bays deep. Royal palaces that were constructed towards the east of the mosque blocks light from entering. As a result, five of the smaller domes have openings at their apexes.

Recessed into the western wall is the pentagonal mihrab, entered through a cusped arch.

== Gallery ==
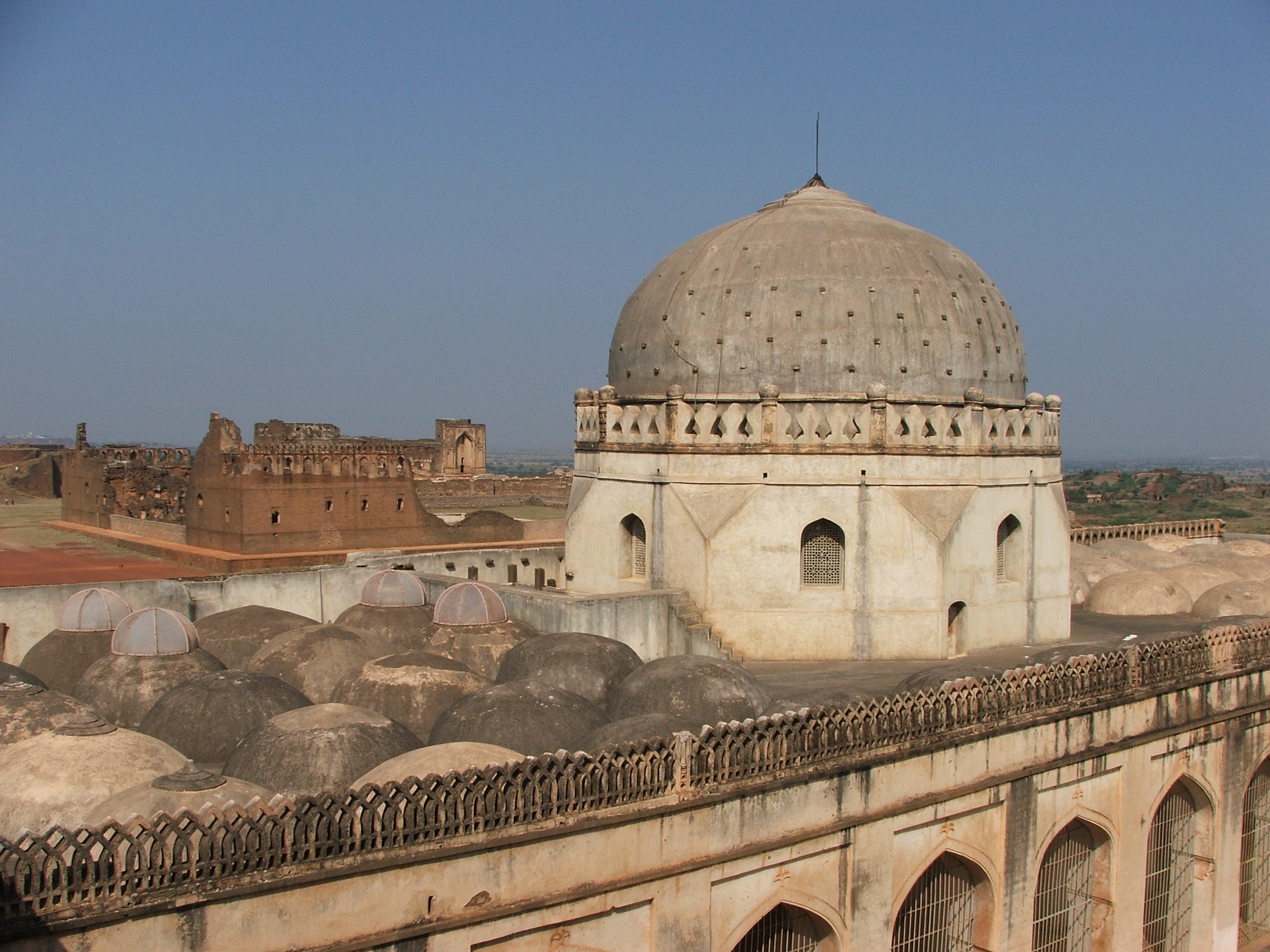
The smaller domes on the roof are hidden from view by the parapet wall

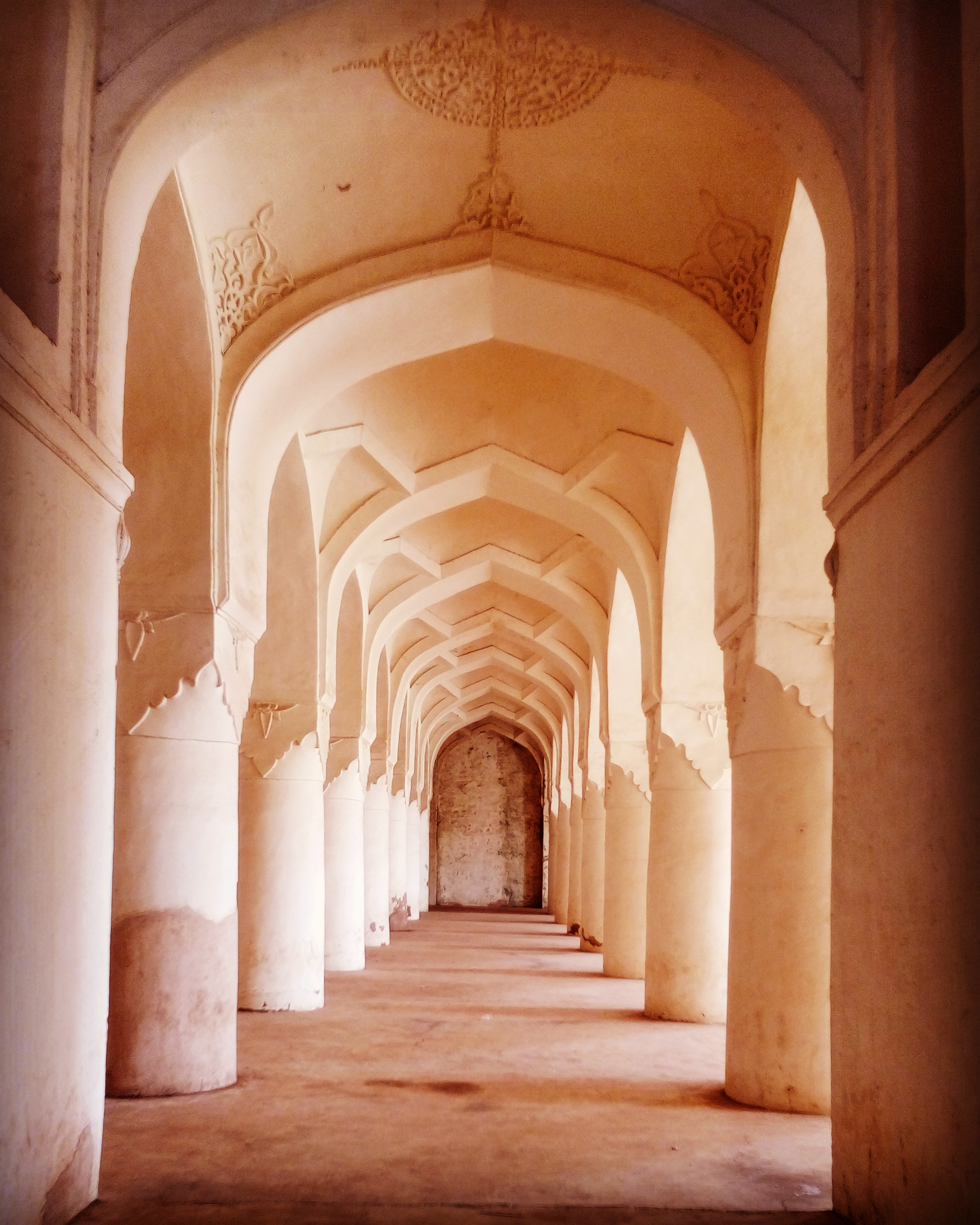
Inside the arches

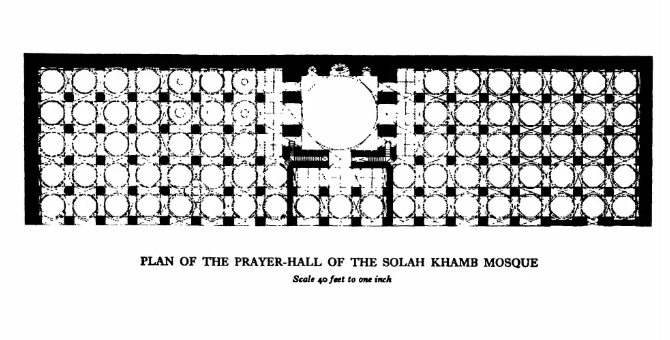
Plan of the prayer hall

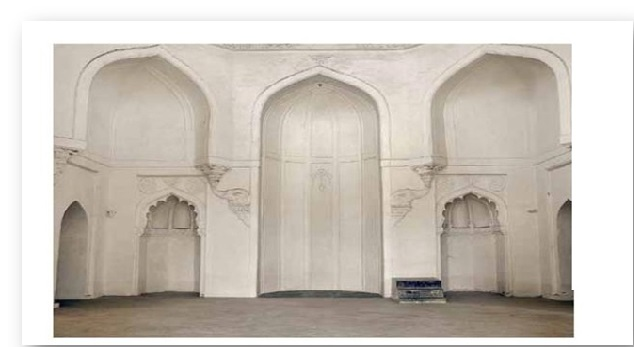
The western wall; the central niche is the mihrab

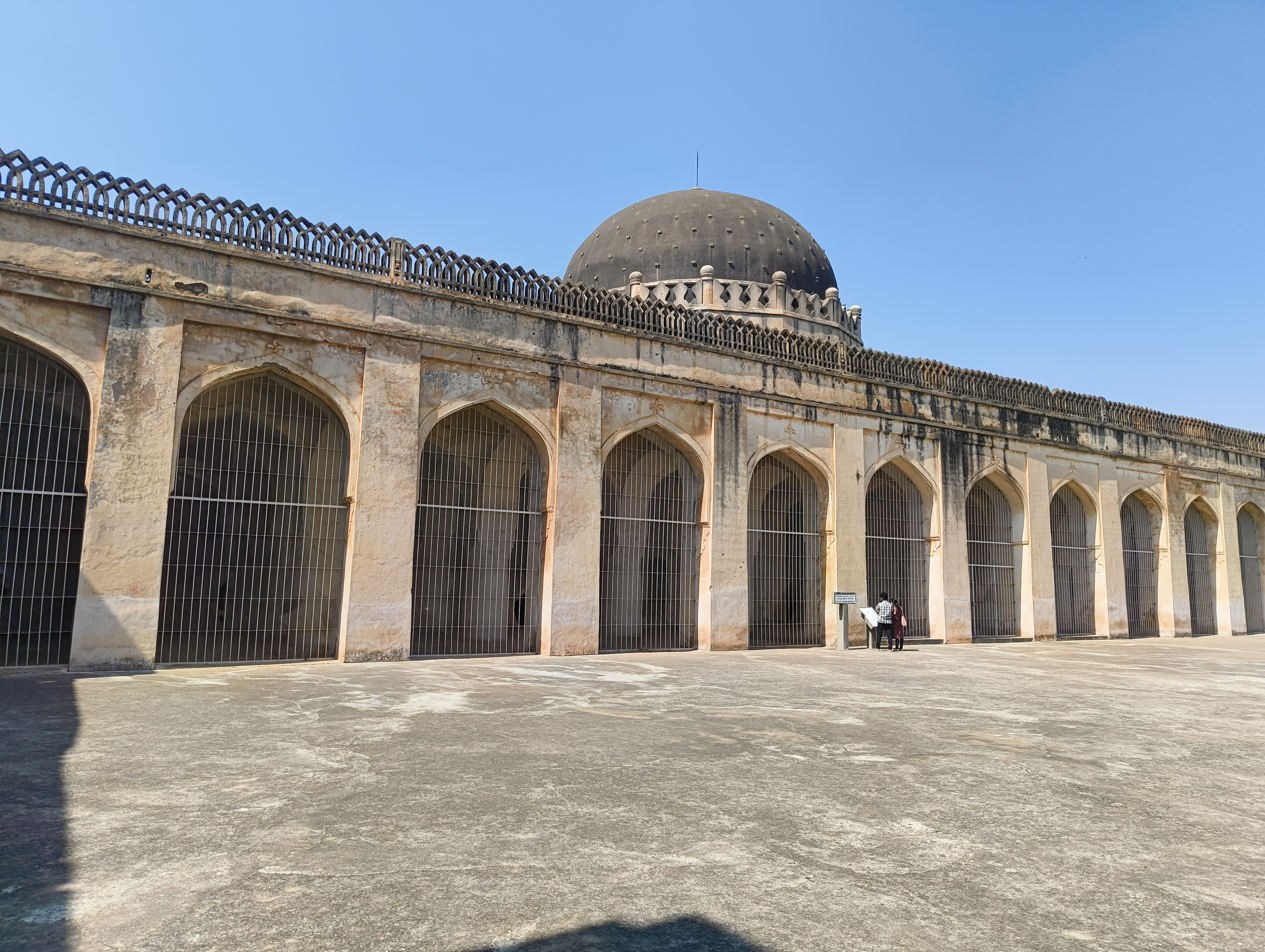

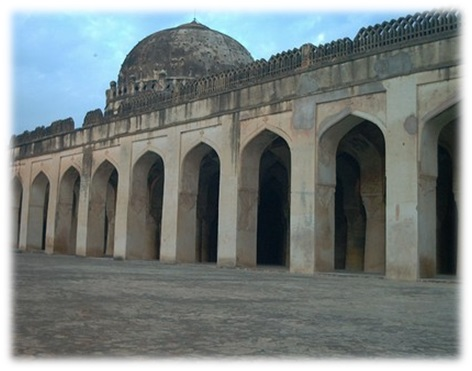

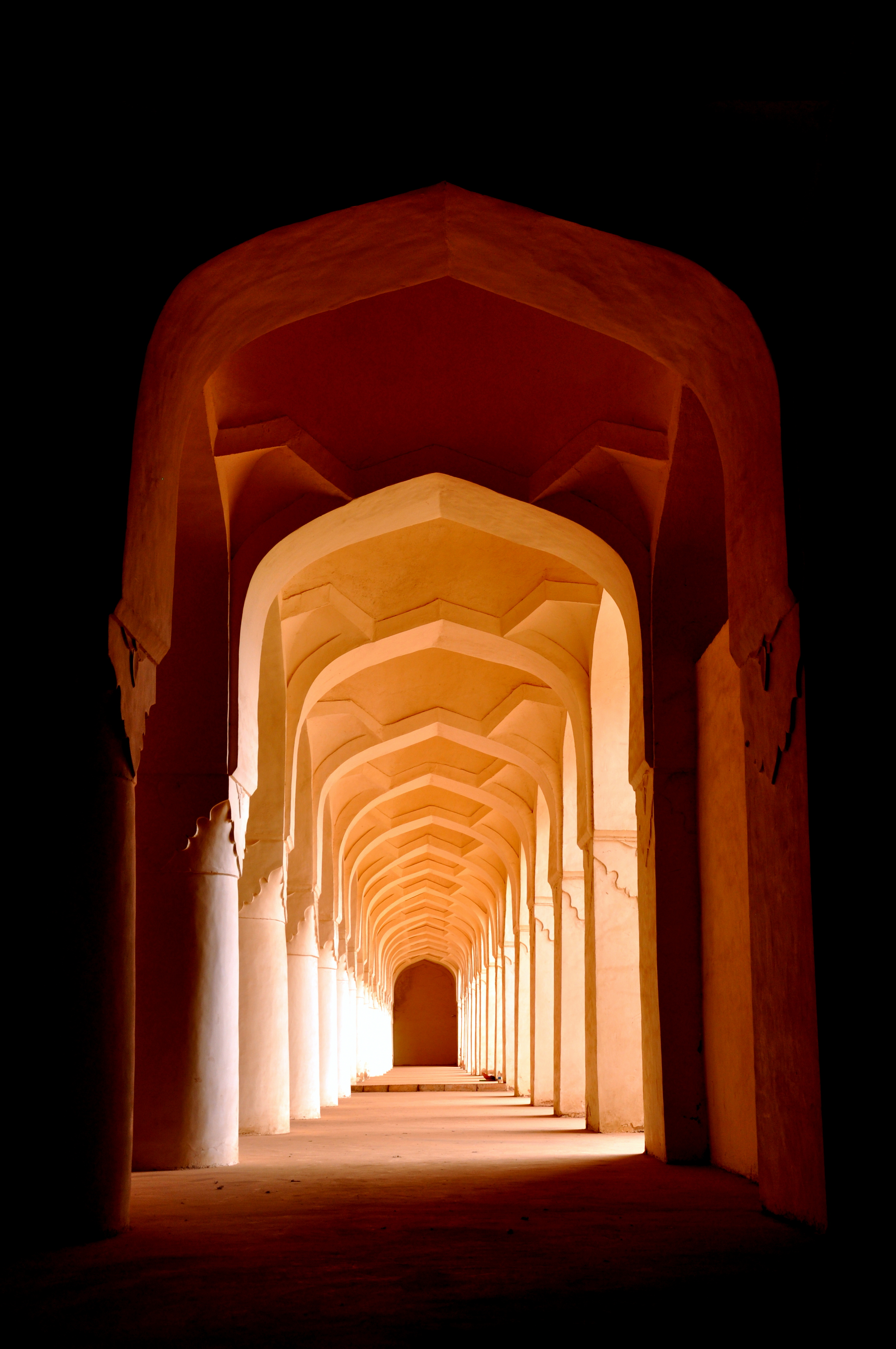

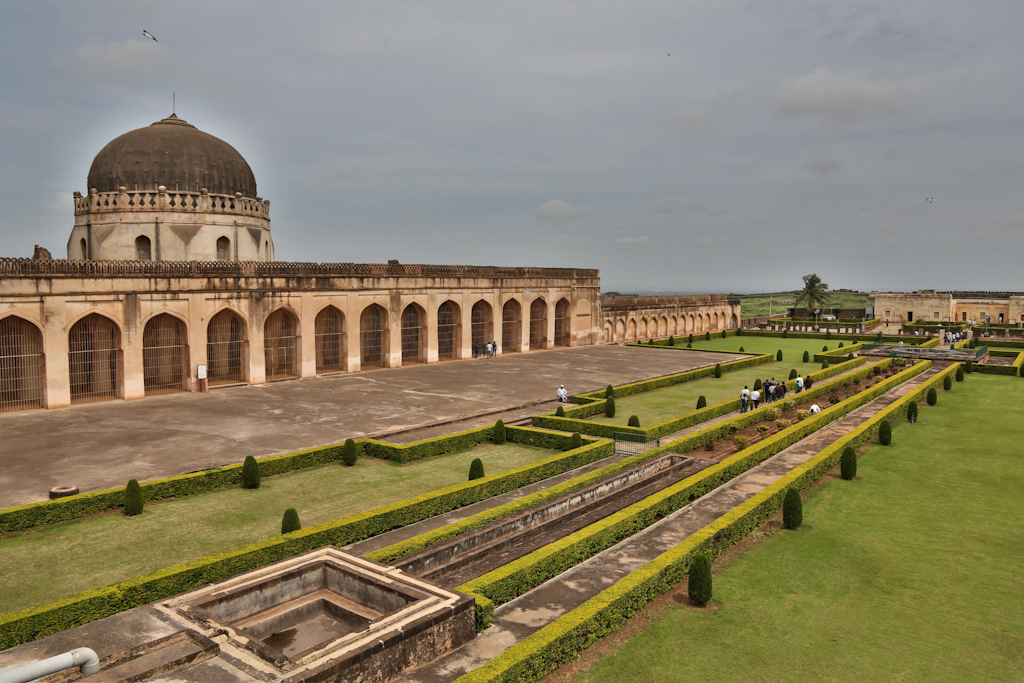

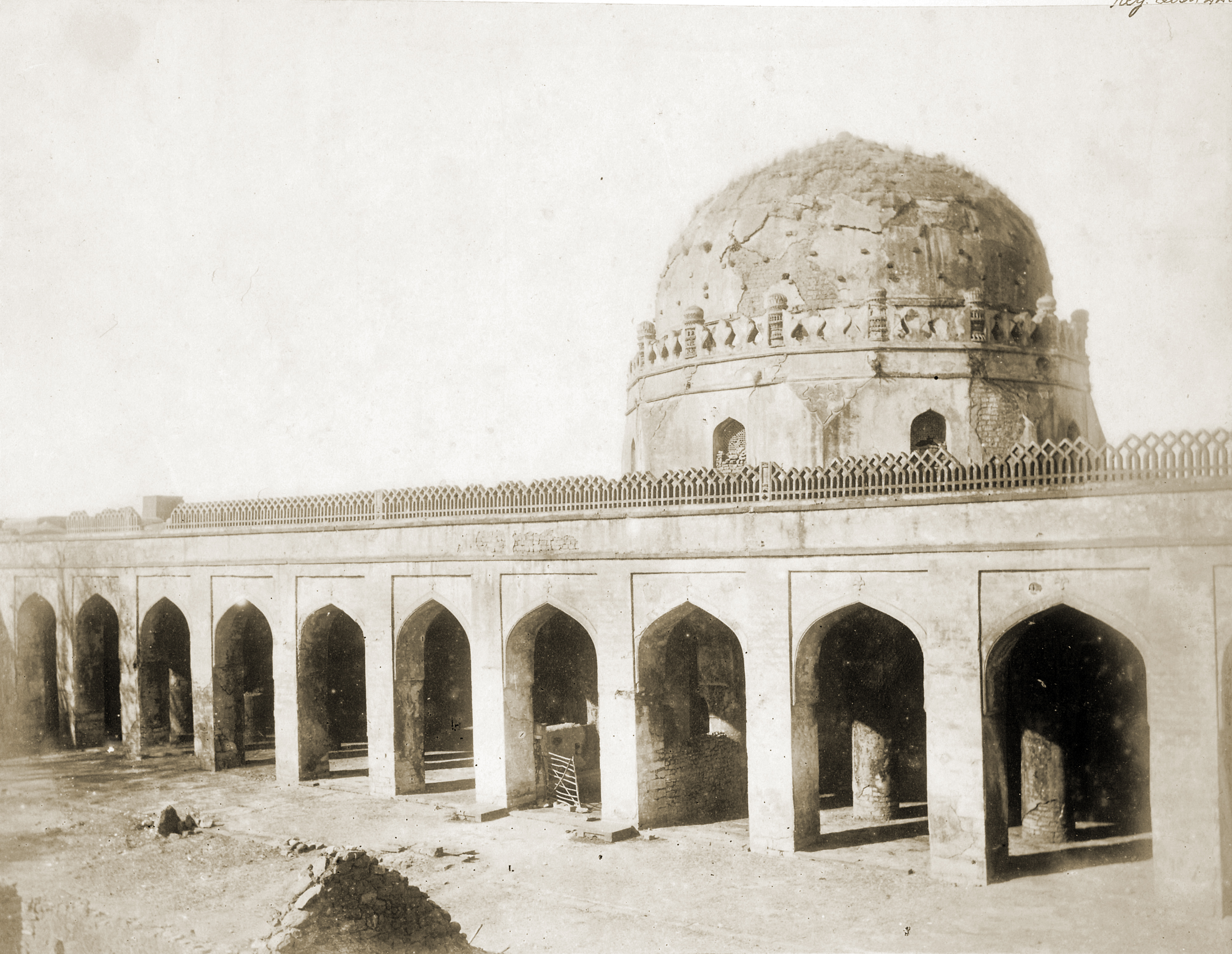

== See also ==
- Islam in India
- List of mosques in India
