= Karanja River =

Coordinates: 18°06′N 77°04′E

Karanja

Location
- Country: India
- State: Telangana, Karnataka
- Region: South India

Physical characteristics
- Source
  - location: Karnataka, India
  - elevation: 556 m (1,824 ft)
- Mouth
  - location: India
- Length: 74 km (46 mi)

The Karanja River is a tributary of the Manjira River. The river basin is up to 2,422 km sq. The Karanja river is perennial river. It flows over a distance of 74 km with Karanja reservoir being major water source. The river is not navigable. The river flows through Bidar district in Karnataka.

Karanja dam, a major irrigation project in the district, has a total capacity of 9.27 tmc ft. The dam was commissioned in 1969 to irrigate 29,227 hectares of land using 9.27 tmc ft. of water. It was completed in 1989.

In Bidar district of Karnataka, there are Surang Bavis (wells), built by Behmani Kings, which connect the Karanja river valley on Kalaburagi road to the Manjra valley on the Karnataka-Telangana border near Aliabad village.
