= Basavakalyana Fort =

- Part of Basavakalyana town, Bidar District, Karnataka
- Basavakalyana, India
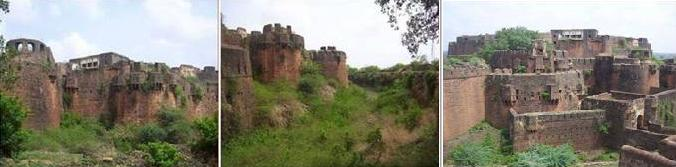
- View of Basavakalyana Fort

Site information
- Type: Fort
- Owner: Western Chalukya Empire (1050-1195); Government of Karnataka (1956–present)
- Open to the public: Yes
- Condition: Ruins

Location
- Coordinates: 17.884°N 76.948°E

Site history
- Built: 973
- Built by: Nalaraja
- Battles/wars: Several

Basavakalyana fort, earlier known as Kalyana fort, is located in Bidar district in the Indian state of Karnataka. Its historic importance is dated to the 10th century. The capital of Rashtrakutas was also shifted from Manyakheta to Kalyana in the 10th century. The fort, integral to the Basavakalyana town, is also famous as Karmabhoomi of Basavanna (founder of Lingayatha community) and hundreds of other Sharanas (saints of Lingayatha community).

Basavakalyana (known in the history as Kalyana) with its fort was the centre of a great social and religious movement, in the 12th century, because of Basaveshwara, the social reformer. It became a seat of learning. Basaveshwara, Akka Mahadevi, Channabasavanna, Siddarama and many more Sharanas are associated with Basavakalyana. Basaveshwara, in particular, fought against casteism and orthodoxy in Hinduism.

== Geography ==
Basavakalyana is located at 17.87°N 76.95°E. It has an average elevation of 2,082 feet (635 m).

== History ==
The later Chalukyas, under Tailapa II (973–997 CE), defeated the Rashtrakutas. They established their capital at Kalyana, now renamed officially after Indian independence in 1947, as Basavakalyana in Bidar district. During the Kalyana Chalukya's reign of Taila II itself, the fort was constructed in 973 by Nalaraja. Inscriptions at the fort ascribe to this fact.

Basavakalyana, with its fort as its headquarters, was the royal capital of the Western Chalukya (Kalyani Chalukya) dynasty from 1050 to 1195. Someshvara I (1041–1068) made Kalyana as his capital, recognised as Kalyani Chalukyas to differentiate with Badami Chalukyas. Later it was ruled by Someshvara II, Vikramaditya VI, Someshvara III, Jagadeka Malla III and Tailapa III. During 10th-12th centuries, this dynasty controlled nearly half of India. Subsequent rulers such as Kalachuri dynasty, Yadavas, Muhammad bin Tughlaq, Bahmani Sultanate, Bidar Sultanate, Bijapur Sultans, Sultan of Ahmadnagar, the Vijayanagar Empire, the Mughals, and the Nizams controlled the fort and refurbished it.

In fact, the Bijjala Deva (1130–1167) of the Kalachuri dynasty who was feudatory Chief of the Chalukyas from 1156 to 1168, overthrew the Tailapa III of the Chalukya Kingdom, killed the ruler and his entire Chalukya family, and ruled for a short spell of 5 years, from 1163 to 1167, over the entire Deccan and Kalinga. He shifted his capital from Mangaliveda (Mangalavada) to Kalyani and made it his new capital. He abdicated in 1167 in favour of his son Sovideva, but was murdered later in 1168. Bijjala was a Jain but is said to have patronized and favored spread of Virashaivism - a new religious belief started by Basaveshwara. Basaveshwara also became the powerful Prime Minister under Bijjala and used his authority to spread his religious philosophy. Kalachuri's rule was short-lived and Chalukays regained their kingdom, though for a short time.

In 1310, the fort was attacked by Mallil Kafur during his southern invasion. In the 16th century, Vijayanagar Emperor Rama Raya (1484–1565) traced his ancestry with the past Chalukyan Kingdom (974–1190) and also with this dynasty's capital, Kalyana. He was also called the ‘Lord of Kalyana’, apart from being known as the "Chalukyan Emperor". He had aligned with different Muslim rulers of the Deccan during his reign to have a symbolic control of the Kalyan fort. In 1543, he defeated the Sultan of Bidar and gave control of the fort to Sultan of Bijapur. In 1549, when equations changed, he allied with Sultan of Ahmadnagar and attacked the Kalyana fort and gave its control to his ally. However, in 1558, after the death of Bijapur Sultan, his son Adil Shah I forged friendship with Rama Raya and defeated the Sultan of Ahmadnagar. Raya had set three conditions of surrender to the defeated Sultan of Ahmadnagar, one was that the Sultan would meet him in his tent and accept paan (combination of betel not and betel leaf), the second was that the Sultan's general would be executed and the third was to hand over the key of Kalyana fort to him personally. All three conditions were met. The key to the Kalyana fort was handed over by the Hussain of Ahmadnagar formally to Raya, who in turn handed it over to his ally Adil Shah of Bijapur. Raya held the fort symbolically only as a mark of his past association with his ancestors of Western Kalyana dynasty who had fought against the Cholas of Tamil Nadu. In 1561, Hussain of Ahmadnagar again made an attempt to capture the fort but was trounced by Raya and his ally Adil Shah I. But in the bargain, Raya, because of his plunderous approach to the lands that he conquered after wars, antagonised the Sultans of Bijapur as well as Ahmednagar. This resulted in the ultimate downfall of his Vijayanagara Empire in the Battle of Tallikota, in 1565, in which all the Muslim kingdoms of the Deccan namely, Bidar, Ahmadnagar, Bijapur and Golconda had joined hands to defeat the Raya.

Someshwara, poet Bilhana of Kashmir and Vigyaneshwara were in the court of Vikramaditya II at Kalyana. In the 12th century Basaveshwara who was the Prime Minister during the reign of King Bijjala was responsible for starting a cultural revolution from here to remove the social evils of untouchability and end gender discrimination. He established the Virashaiva philosophy.

Jainism flourished during the rule of Chalukyas. The fort constructed by Chalukya kings has a large number of Jain images on the walls. The museum located, just adjoining the fort, has a number of Jain idols, which belong to the 10th and 11th centuries. A Jain temple now in ruins is also found here.

== Structure ==
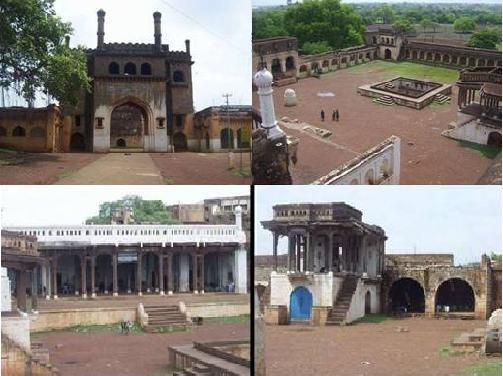
Monuments in the Basavakalyan Fort

The fort is strategically built as a defence structure in a camouflaged setting, which is not discernible until the enemy is at close quarters of the fort. This gives advantage for the defence forces holed up in the fort to repulse enemy attacks. This strategy of locating the fort in naturally camouflaged locations was popular in the forts built in the Deccan.

In the Kalyan or Basvakalyan fort, as an economy measure, the defences of the fort were built by inter-connecting large boulders scattered on the hills with strong fort walls. The fort was made defensively complex with guard rooms and barbicans, which was a novelty at that time. The fort consisted of three concentric irregular fort walls.

The fort has seven gates, out of which five are in good shape. At the entrance to the fort, there is solid arch with balconies on the flanks accessed by series of steps on either side. The fort walls encircling the central courtyard have guard rooms, which are also combined with many bastions and mounted by cannons (some of the cannons are also ornamented). Cannons are also lined along the approach path to the citadel. The fort walls are engraved with images of Yalis. At the top of gateways, openings are seen, which were likely used to douse the enemy with boiling oil. Another defence measure is the deep moat that surrounds the fort. The citadel is centrally located within the fort, on a high ground.

The main door to the citadel is known as the 'Akhand Darwaza' built with four red stone slabs. From the doorway, up a flight of steps is the passage to the Rajmahal palace (mostly in ruins). However, the ceiling in the palace hall displays colourful designs. The central wall in the hall has patterns of vases and urns. Adjoining the palace is a temple that does not have any deity. However, at its entrance, the vertical stone columns depict well-carved sculpture. There is a square pond in front of the temple. Behind the temple to the west is the Rani Mahal (Queen's palace), from where there is an exclusive approach to the temple.

Also seen within the fort precincts are: an empty pond with pillar of a fountain at the centre; a platform used during Muharram prayers; two deep wells on the northeast and western sides with inclined ramps for the oxen or horses to draw water; secret narrow passages to underground chambers for emergency escape during enemy attacks; the Talim Khana, a chamber used as a gymnasium; a cannon popularly called the 'Khadak Bijli Thopu’ (literal meaning: "sharp lightning cannon") on the second bastion; and a long cannon placed on a circular battlement on the southern wall.

== Access ==
Basavakalyan Fort is located approximately 90 kilometres (56 mi) from Gulbarga which is well connected by road and rail. It lies about 650 kilometres (400 mi) from Bangalore, 80 kilometres (50 mi) from Bidar, and approximately 200 kilometres (120 mi)from Hyderabad.

== See also ==
- Basavakalyana
