= Battle of Betamcarla =

Battle of Betamcerla
- Part of Vijayanagar Civil War (1542-1543)
Date	1542
Location	Betamcerla, Andhra Pradesh, India
Result	Rama Raya victory

Belligerents
Aliya Rama Raya's Faction	Salakamraju Pedda Tirumala's Faction

Commanders and leaders
Sadasiva Raya; Aliya Rama Raya; Tirumala Deva Raya; Venkatadri; Pemmasani Erra Timmanayudu; Ramaraja Tirumala; Akkaya Cina Timma Nayaka	Salakamraju Tirumala; Chintagunti Raghupati

The Battle of Betamcharla was a battle between the forces of Aliya Rama Raya and the army of Salakamraju Tirumala, led by Chintagunti Raghupati. Raghupati's forces were defeated and he was pursued into his fortress. Cina Timma Nayaka, a key commander in Rama Raya's army, led a successful siege, capturing the fortress and ultimately razing it to the ground.

== Background ==
After Salakaraju Tirumala's bold advance to Gandikota, demanding the surrender of Rama Raya was met with staunch defiance from Pemmasani Erra Timmanayudu the fort's resolute lord. Rallying the support of neighboring palegars, Timma Nayudu joined forces with Rama Raya to confront Tirumala in a fierce battle at Komali, a village near Tadipatri. Tirumala's forces were defeated, scattering in retreat as Rama Raya and his allies pursued them.

== Battle ==
After their victory at Komali, Rama Raya's army advanced northward into the province of Kurnool though the precise reason for this route remains unclear. It is likely that the presence of enemy forces in two strongholds influenced their decision. Significant clashes occurred near Awaku, the capital of Rama Raja Tirumala, Rama Raya’s uncle. This campaign earned Rama Raja Tirumala great acclaim, as he was hailed for "saving the whole earth from sinking in the ocean of destruction caused by the monster Salaka Tirumala".

It can be presumed that Rama Raja Tirumala took command of his nephew Rama Raya's army during this campaign. the army’s move to Awuku was a strategic decision, as it served as an excellent base for launching military operations against Bethamcherla and other key locations in the vicinity. Among the notable figures in this campaign was Akkaya Cina Timma Nayaka, a cousin of the Gandikota captain, who distinguished himself in several engagements. His exceptional efforts marked him as one of the most active and valuable subordinates of Rama Raja Tirumala.

While Rama Raya's army advanced, Salakamraju Tirumala was far from idle, rallying his supporters to resist the invasion. Among his allies, Chintagunti Raghupati the chief of Bethamcherla made an attempt to halt the army’s progress but was defeated and forced to retreat into a fortress. Cina Timma Nayaka led the siege, ultimately capturing the fort, which was subsequently razed to the ground.

== Aftermath ==
With the enemy cleared from the hilly tracts around Awaku, Rama Raya's forces pressed northward, continuing their campaign toward Kurnool.

== See also ==
- Pemmasani Nayaks
- Rama Raya
- Tirumala Deva Raya
- Vijayanagar Empire
