= Battle of Komali =

1542 Vijayanagara Civil War battle

- Part of Vijayanagar Civil War (1542-1543)
Date	1542
Location	Andhra Pradesh, India
Result	Rama Raya victory

Belligerents
Aliya Rama Raya's Faction	Salakamraju Pedda Tirumala's Faction

Commanders and leaders
Sadasiva Raya; Aliya Rama Raya; Tirumala Deva Raya; Venkatadri; Pemmasani Erra Timmanayudu; Hande Hanumappa Nayaka	Salakamraju Tirumala; Salakaya; Chintagunti Raghupati

The Battle of Komali was a conflict between the faction of Salakamraju Tirumala and the forces of Aliya Rama Raya, led by Pemmasani Erra Timmanayudu. When Tirumala arrived at Gandikota with a large force, he demanded that Erra Timmanayudu surrender Aliya Rama Raya. Refusing to surrender, Timmanayudu, with the support of neighboring palegars, marched out to confront Tirumala. The two sides clashed near Komali, a village west of Tadipatri where Timmanayudu’s forces defeated Tirumala.

== Background ==
After Achyuta Deva Raya’s reign, his son Venkata I succeeded him, but the throne was usurped by Salakaraju Pedda Tirumala, who eliminated all claimants and proclaimed himself emperor and seek the assistance of Bijapur Sultan Ibrahim Adil Shah I. Outraged by this tyranny, the nobles of Vijayanagar turned to Rama Raya for to end the tyranny of Salakamraju Tirumala. Responding to their pleas, Rama Raya led a rebellion in the name of Sadasiva Raya, proclaimed Sadasiva Raya as the rightful emperor, and rallied the nobles of the empire to join his cause against Tirumala’s oppressive rule.

== Battle ==
Rama Raya seeking to strengthen his position against Salaka Tirumala, summoned prominent jagirdars, including Hande Hanumappa Nayaka, Mesa Peddappa Nayaka, and Majjahari Tulasipati, to assemble with their troops at Penukonda. Addressing the gathered leaders, he highlighted Salaka Tirumala’s misdeeds and inspired their cooperation with promises of rewards and titles for their victory. Mesa Peddappa Nayaka took the lead in gathering intelligence, deploying spies to track Salaka Tirumala’s movements. Equipped with this strategic information, Rama Raya and the united forces launched a coordinated rebellion against their Salakamraju Tirumala.

Rama Raya next advanced to the region of Gandikota where the Pemmasani chief held significant influence, to gather additional troops and strengthen his forces. This strategic move, coupled with the fall of Penukonda posed a direct threat to Salakamraju Tirumala's authority. Recognizing the danger to his power, Salakamraju Tirumala realized that immediate action was essential. Determined to crush this rebellion and secure his position, he prepared to confront Rama Raya and his growing forces without delay.

Despite being abandoned by most of his nobles, Salakamraju Tirumala was not entirely without support. Among the loyalists who stood by him were Salakaya, son of Mingi Baiyya Nayaka, the Palegar of Bedagallu Chintagunti Raghupati, the Palegar of Betamcherla; and his subordinate, Chintagunti Siddaya Hanumayadeva. With their backing, Tirumala retained enough confidence to take the field against Rama Raya.

Salakaraju Tirumala boldly advanced to Gandikota demanding that Pemmasani Erra Timmanayudu, the lord of the fort, surrender Rama Raya. However, Timma Nayudu refused and, rallying the forces of neighboring palegars, marched out of the fortress alongside Rama Raya to confront Tirumala. The two armies clashed at Komali, a village six miles west of Tadipatri. In the fierce battle that followed, Tirumala's forces were decisively defeated and fled the battlefield, pursued by the victorious Rama Raya and his allies.

== See also ==
- Pemmasani Erra Timmanayudu
- Rama Raya
- Vijayanagar Empire
