= Battle of Bedagallu =

1543 Vijayanagara civil war battle

- Part of Vijayanagar Civil War (1542-1543)
Date	1543
Location	Bedagallu, India
Result	Rama Raya victory

Belligerents
Aliya Rama Raya's Faction	Salakamraju Pedda Tirumala's Faction

Commanders and leaders
Sadasiva Raya; Aliya Rama Raya; Tirumala Deva Raya; Venkatadri; Pemmasani Erra Timmanayudu; Ramaraja Tirumala; Akkaya Cina Timma Nayaka	Salakamraju Tirumala; Salakaya

The Battle of Bedagallu was an encounter between Rama Raya and the faction of Salakamraju Tirumala, led by his general Salakaya. After his defeat at the Battle of Juturu Salakaya retreated to Bedagallu, his jagir in the Adavani province. Rama Raya pursued him relentlessly along the banks of the Tungabhadra River. At Bedagallu, Salakaya attempted to resist by offering battle, but he was once again defeated.

== Background ==
At Juturu, Rama Raya's advance was met with resistance from Salakaya the general of Tirumala, who gathered his forces to block the path and engage in battle. Despite his efforts, Salakaya was defeated and compelled to retreat. With this obstacle eliminated, Rama Raya continued his march and successfully reached Kurnool his ancestral seat.

== Battle ==
Though defeated at the Battle of Juturu, Salakaya Tirumala was not entirely crushed and retreated with the remnants of his army to Bedagallu, his jagir in the Adavani province. Rama Raya determined to eliminate the threat, pursued him along the upper course of the Tungabhadra River. Salakaya, forced to defend his territory, assembled his forces before Bedagallu to confront the advancing army. A fierce battle ensued, with both sides displaying great valor. However, Salakaya's troops eventually broke into disarray and fled. Unable to withstand Rama Raya's might any longer, Salakaya likely retired to Vijayanagara. seeking refuge with his master.

== See also ==
- Aravidu Dynasty
- Pemmasani Nayaks
- Sadasiva Raya
