= Hande Hanumappa Nayaka =

Vassal king of Vijayanagara (1497–1582)

Vassal king of The Vijayanagara Empire
- Monarch: Sadasiva Raya
- Succeeded by: Immadi Hampa Nayaka(Ankusharaya)

Personal details
- Born: 9 April 1497 Muttagi, Bijapur Sultanate (present-day Muttagi village, Vijayapura district, Karnataka, India)
- Died: 1582 (aged 84–85) Bukkarayasamudram, Vijayanagara Empire (present-day Ananthapur, Andhra Pradesh, India)
- Resting place: Nidumamidi Mutt, Anantapur, Andhra Pradesh.
- Children: Immadi Hampa Nayaka; Devappa Nayaka; Nitya Maduvaniga Ramappa Nayaka; Hire Malakappa Nayaka; Chikka Malakappa Nayaka

Military service
- Allegiance: Vijayanagara Empire
- Branch/service: Vijayanagara Army
- Years of service: 1542–1569
- Rank: Vassal king
- Unit: Vijayanagara Infantry
- Battles/wars: See list: Vijayanagar Civil War (1542–1543); Battle of Tungabhadra River (1543); Battle of Kalyani (1543); Siege of Ahmednagar (1543)

Hanumappa Nayaka was vassal king of Ballari and Anantapur under Vijayanagara Empire he founded the city of New Ballari and established Hande dynasty, he was born to Laxmigouda and Devakki in a Nadgouda(Village chief) family of the Veerashaiva Hande clan(Handevazir) in present day Bijapur. initially, he served as a chieftain in the court of Ibrahim Adil Shah I of Bijapur, where he gained the title of Badshahi Vazir, and was rewarded with ownership of 11 parganas(1 Paragana equals 48 Villages) Thus, to this day, a branch of his descendants calls themselves Hande Vazir/Handevazir. According to the Ballari and Kurugodu Kaifiyat, it is believed that once Hande Hanumappa Nayaka was summoned to the court of Bijapur. He arrived there with his five sons. The Badshah, upon seeing his sons, asked him to hand over one of them so that he could be converted to Islam. Hande Hanumappa Nayaka, was deeply enraged by this demand and boldly retorted, "Hand over one of your wives to me, and I shall give you sons like mine." Offended by his defiance, the Badshah ordered the captivity of Hanumappa and his five sons. However, Hande Hanumappa Nayaka managed to evade capture by the Sultan’s forces, successfully crossing the Krishna River to escape. Later he became a prominent commander in the Vijayanagar Empire played a crucial role in consolidating the power of Rama Raya during the Vijayanagara Civil War against the Salakamraju Tirumala brothers. His military expertise and leadership were instrumental in securing Rama Raya's victory, solidifying his dominance in the empire. Hanumappa Nayaka's greatest achievement came in 1543 during the Battle of Kalyani, where he led the Vijayanagar forces to a victory against the combined armies of Bijapur, Ahmadnagar, and Golconda. Impressed by the victory Rama Raya bestowed upon him the lands in the eastern country Nandyala, Bukkarayasamudram, Anantapur, Dharmavaram, Kanekal and in the west, Ballari and Kurgodu

== Military career ==
=== Vijayanagara Civil War (1542-1543) ===
As tensions grew within the Vijayanagar Empire Rama Raya sought to consolidate his power and counter the influence of Salaka Tirumala. To rally support, he issued royal summons to trusted commanders and jagirdars, including Hande Hanumappa Nayaka, Mesa Peddappa Nayaka, and Majjahari Tulasipati, instructing them to assemble their forces at Penukonda. Responding loyally these leaders gathered with their troops, recognizing the urgency of the situation. At the assembly, Rama Raya detailed the misdeeds and threats posed by Salaka Tirumala, emphasizing the need for unity to restore stability to the empire. He promised generous rewards and prestigious titles for those who contributed to the campaign’s success. Demonstrating initiative, Mesa Peddappa Nayaka volunteered to gather intelligence, deploying spies to track Salaka Timma’s movements. Armed with critical information, Rama Raya supported by his commanders and their combined forces, launched a rebellion against Salaka Tirumala.

Following a series of victories against Salakamraju Pedda Tirumala’s forces, Rama Raya advanced towards Vijayanagara determined to consolidate his power. While stationed near Adoni Rama Raya orchestrated a strategic campaign of espionage and psychological warfare. Spies were dispatched to infiltrate Tirumala’s camp, where they spread rumors questioning his legitimacy and caste, undermining his authority among his troops. Additionally, bribes were offered to Tirumala’s captains, sowing further discord and prompting thoughts of desertion. With Tirumala’s forces weakened and divided, Rama Raya launched a surprise assault, exploiting the chaos to secure a decisive victory. Tirumala, abandoned by his captains, fled but was soon captured by Rama Raya’s officers. His execution and the public display of his severed head marked the end of his rebellion. Hanumappa Nayaka, a key commander in Rama Raya’s army, played a vital role in this campaign, contributing to the final defeat of Tirumala and solidifying Rama Raya’s dominance in Vijayanagara.

=== Battle of Tungabhadra ===
The Battle of the Tungabhadra River marked the last battle of a series of conflicts in the Vijayanagar Civil War (1542–1543) between Salakamraju Tirumala and Rama Raya. Before the battle, the army was strategically divided into three divisions—each commanded by Hande Hanumappa Nayaka, Tirumala Raya, and Rama Raya respectively. This decisive battle ended with the capture of Salakamraju, whose forces were outmaneuvered and betrayed by his own captains. Following his capture, Tirumala was executed, bringing an end to his resistance. With the rival faction defeated, the queens of Krishnadevaraya Tirumala Devi and Chinnadevi joyfully opened the gates of the capital to Rama Raya and his victorious army. Soon after, Rama Raya orchestrated the coronation of Sadasiva Raya as emperor, solidifying his position as the empire’s de facto ruler.

=== Battle of Kalyani ===
In 1543, Ibrahim Adil Shah I of Bijapur, seeking to expand his influence, entered into a secret alliance with Burhan Nizam Shah I of Ahmadnagar against Bidar and Vijayanagara. According to their agreement, Ahmadnagar would focus on Ali Barid Shah I of Bidar, while Bijapur advanced into Vijayanagara’s territories unchallenged. Acting swiftly, Burhan Nizam Shah I captured the fort of Kandhar while Ibrahim Adil Shah I imprisoned Amir Barid Shah of Bidar, who had unsuspectingly sought refuge with him. Ibrahim Adil Shah I then turned his forces south, claiming to have made significant gains against Vijayanagara. However historical records suggest these claims were likely exaggerated, as Vijayanagara's borders showed no notable reductions. Furthermore Rama Raya’s subsequent conflict with Ahmadnagar indicates that Vijayanagara’s military strength and territorial integrity remained intact.

Rama Raya recognizing Burhan Nizam Shah I of Ahmadnagar as the primary force behind the alliance against Vijayanagara adopted a strategic approach to disrupt the coalition between Ahmadnagar and Bijapur. Rather than engaging Bijapur directly, he chose to confront Ahmadnagar, aiming to fracture their partnership and weaken their combined strength. Mobilizing his forces, Rama Raya advanced towards Ahmadnagar.

To reach Ahmadnagar’s territories, Rama Raya carefully navigated the regions controlled by Golconda and Bidar anticipating potential resistance. Understanding the complexities of the campaign he divided his army into three divisions Rama Raya personally led the forces against the Sultan of Golconda, while his brother Tirumala advanced towards Bidar to neutralize opposition there. The third division, commanded by the seasoned general Hande Hanumappa Nayudu of Sonnalapuram, marched directly towards Ahmadnagar.

The campaign against Ahmadnagar vividly recounted in Hindu poems, culminated in the capture of Kaliyani and a decisive battle between the Vijayanagar army and the allied forces of Ahmadnagar, Golconda, and Bidar. While the Vasucharitramu offers limited details on Kaliyani’s fall, the Annals of Hande Anantapuram provide a thorough account of the confrontation. After reuniting their three divisions, the Vijayanagar forces met the combined armies of the three Sultans in fierce battle. The battle ended in a victory for Vijayanagar as the Sultanate forces collapsed and the Sultans fled the field. In the aftermath, the Vijayanagar army pursued the retreating forces. During this pursuit Hande Hanumappa Nayaka captured Burhan Nizam Shah I.

After capturing Burhan Nizam Shah I during the pursuit, Hande Hanumappa Nayaka presented the imprisoned Sultan to Rama Raya and Tirumala Raya. Impressed by his valor and loyalty, the brothers received Hanumappa Nayaka with great admiration and gratitude. Recognizing the significance of this victory and the impact it had on weakening Ahmadnagar’s influence, they publicly praised his efforts. In acknowledgment of his service, Rama Raya and Tirumala Deva Raya offered Hanumappa Nayaka the opportunity to request any reward he desired he replied.

Whatever your honours please it will be equal to all rewards. - Hande Hanumappa Nayaka

== Titles and honors ==
After the battle, Rama Raya of the Vijayanagara Empire conferred prestigious titles upon Hande Hanumappa Nayaka in recognition of his valor and service. One such elaborate honorific was:

śrīman rāja haṇḍe yaśavanta paradaḷa vibhāḍa ari-rāya māramardhana

which translates to "The illustrious King Hande, glorious in battle formation, vanquisher of enemy kings." In addition to these titles, Hanumappa Nayaka was also honored with Mayura Pincham (Navilugari) a ceremonial peacock feather, traditionally a mark of valor and royal recognition. Navubatu a special leather instrument awarded/played as a part of courtly or military honors symbolizing martial prowess. Haldi Nishana a military banner, symbolizing victory and valor.

== Building activities ==
After receiving these honors, Hanumappa Nayaka took leave of the Rajas and arrived in Nandela in the year 1569 AD, during the month of Margasira. Assuming his new responsibilities, he traveled to Bukkarayasamudram, where he marveled at the grandeur of the lake. Inspired by its prominence, he constructed a royal residence (palace) near the fort and fortified the area with a bastion, establishing his rule and ensuring the prosperity of the region. Meanwhile near Ballari fort as soldiers, traders, craftsmen, and temple workers settled around the fort, residential quarters started forming in the plains surrounding it. These growing settlements eventually became known as Ballari Pete (Old Market area), which laid the groundwork for New Ballari to expand. The fort became a symbol of regional power. As it grew in fame and structure, town development radiated outward from the fort, like a cultural and urban epicenter.

=== Ballari Fort ===
Ballari Fort is a historic fortification located in the city of Ballari construeced by Hande Hanumappa Nayaka. Built atop a large granite hill known as Ballari Gudda, the fort offers a commanding view of the surrounding region and has been of strategic military importance for centuries. The fort is divided into two parts the Upper Fort and the Lower Fort each representing different phases of construction and occupation. Located at the summit of Ballari Gudda, is the oldest part of the structure. The strategic height of the Upper Fort allowed for military surveillance over the Deccan plateau, and it was used primarily for defense and watchtower purposes. The Upper Fort was official residence of Hande family for a while. The fortifications are made of massive granite blocks, carefully laid without mortar, showcasing advanced engineering for the time. Steep paths carved along the hill provide access to the fort’s upper levels. Several bastions, gun points, and lookouts are still visible.

=== Seven Step Wells ===
Hande Hanumappa Nayaka, along with the construction of Bellary Fort, also oversaw the building of seven step wells around Ballari between 1560 and 1565, to tackle the region's water crisis. These wells were each named after his sisters and collectively came to be known as the Akka Tangiyara Bavigalu (meaning "sisters' stepwells" in Kannada).

Several of these historic wells still exist today, including:

- Akkamma Bhavi
- Avamma Bhavi
- Neelamma Bhavi
- Sesamma Bhavi

The wells were strategically built to serve the needs of civilians and soldiers stationed at the fort. The western side of Ballari Hill was known as the Western Parade Ground, while the eastern side was known as the Eastern Parade Ground. Due to their proximity and usage by military personnel, the step wells also came to be referred to as Soldiers' Wells.

These wells stand as a testament to the region’s medieval water management systems and Hanumappa Nayaka's foresight in addressing logistical and infrastructural needs during a time of expanding military presence.

=== Tekkalakote Fort ===
According to the Bellary Land Records, Tekkalakote Fort was built by Hande Paalyagara Baalada Hanumappa Nayaka. The fort is square-shaped featuring four bastions positioned at each corner. The northern entrance is decorated with floral motifs of the Vijayanaga style. In the past there had been a total of 14 wells within the fort, and it had been a place for water conservation but today unfortunately, except three wells all got destroyed. In the past the fort has served as a jail and as an armoury, but as of today fort is a education hub of the town, a government school for girl and a college are within the fort premises.

=== Dodda Basaveshwara Temple ===
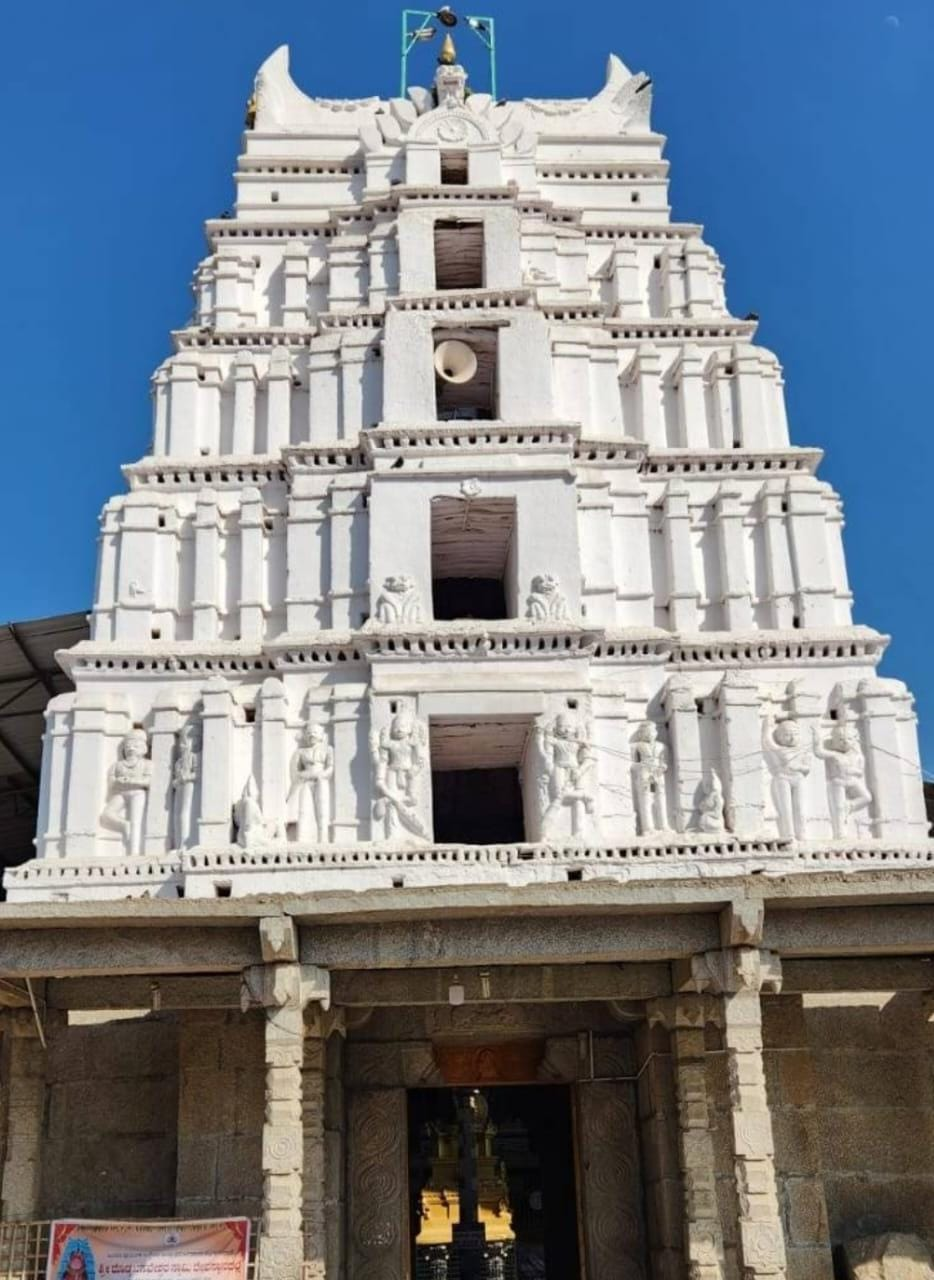
Gopuram of Dodda Basaveshwara

The Dodda Basaveswara temple of Kurugodu, was constructed by Hande nayaka and is the main attraction in town, The idol of the big bull, called Nandi or Nadeeswara, is cut out of a monolithic rock, and is 12' high. The annual rath yatra of the deity is conducted on the Holi Purnima day, which marks the beginning of the spring season, as well as the beginning of the New Year.

=== Dwikuta Temple of Moka village ===
Dwikuta Temple located 2 km southeast of the Sri Malleshwara Temple in Moka village, with one sanctum housing a Shivalinga in the Navaranga (mantapa) and the other featuring a Venkateshwara statue. This architectural design symbolizes the equal reverence for Shaiva and Vaishnava traditions, this temple is believed to have been associated with or built under the patronage of Hande Hanumappa Nayaka, who was although a follower of the Veerashaiva-Lingayat faith , who not only upheld his own traditions but also extended respect and patronage to other faiths, including Vaishnavism.

=== Other Temples Built and Patronized by Hande Hanumappa Nayaka ===
Several of the temples constructed by Hande Hanumappa Nayaka still exist today, including:

- Kote Basaveshwara Temple, located within the historic Ballari Fort premises.
- Swami Venkateshwara Temple, situated in Rupanagudi village, Ballari Taluk, Ballari District.
- Ramalingeshwara Temple, located in Rupanagudi village, Ballari Taluk, Ballari District.
- Shivalaya Temple, also in Rupanagudi village, highlighting the village's religious significance.
- Sri Veerabhadreshwara Temple, found in Karekallu village, Ballari District.
- Sri Nagareshwara Temple, situated in Ballari city, dedicated to Lord Shiva.
- Sri Malleshwara Temple, located in Moka village.

=== Nallacheruvu Lake ===
It is also believed that Nallacheruvu Lake, one of the largest urban lakes in the former Madras Presidency (South India), was expanded by Hande Hanumappa Nayaka to supply water to his military unit stationed at the base of Bellary Fort.

=== Basvannakunte Lake ===
Basavanakunte, a lake in Bellary, was constructed by Hande Hanumappa Nayaka for the welfare and good practice of the local people and to counter water scarcity in that region. The lake still exists and is a part of the region's historical landscape.

== Death ==
Hanumappa Nayaka died in 1583. His remains were buried in Nidumamidi Mutt in Anantapur, Andhra Pradesh.

== See also ==
- Rama Raya
- Tirumala Deva Raya
- Vijayanagara Empire
