= Vijayanagar invasion of Bijapur (1543) =

16th century conflict in Deccan

- Part of Deccani–Vijayanagar wars
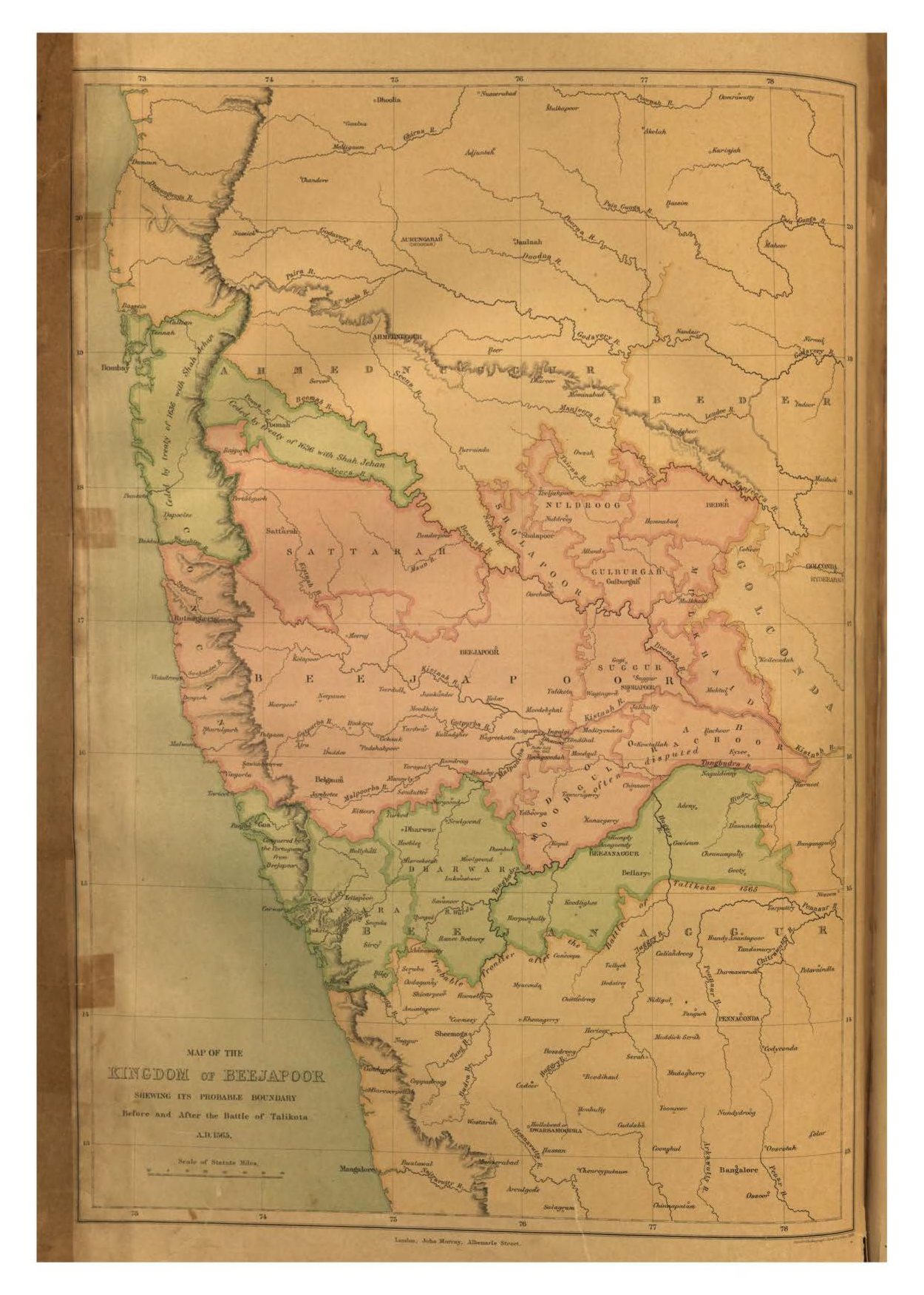
- Map of the Kingdom of Bijapur in 1565
| Date | 1543 |
| Location | Karnataka, India |
| Result | Vijayanagar-Allied victory |

Belligerents
| Vijayanagar Empire; Supported By : Deccan Sultanates: Ahmednagar Sultanate; Golconda Sultanate; Bidar Sultanate | Bijapur Sultanate |

Commanders and leaders
| Rama Raya; Venkatadri; Jamsheed Quli Qutub Shah (WIA); Burhan Nizam Shah I Ali Barid Shah I | Ibrahim Adil Shah I (surrendered); Asad Khan (surrendered) |

The Vijayanagar invasion of Bijapur was a coordinated campaign by a coalition of Ahmadnagar, Golkonda, and Vijayanagara, aimed at weakening the Bijapur Sultanate in the year 1543. Initiated by Burhan Nizam Shah I of Ahmadnagar, the alliance sought to capitalize on Ibrahim Adil Shah's vulnerabilities. Each ally targeted different regions: Ahmadnagar attacked from the northeast, Golkonda from the east, and Vijayanagara advanced from the south under Rama Raya to seize Raichur and the Doab.

== Background ==
The death of Quli Qutb Shah in September 1543 triggered a volatile chain of events in the Deccan. Jamsheed Quli Qutb Shah the new ruler of Golkonda sought to eliminate his brother Ibrahim who had taken refuge in Devarakonda. Fleeing to Bidar, Ibrahim secured the support of Kasim Barid the ambitious ruler of Bidar who saw an opportunity to expand his influence. Kasim Barid marched on Golkonda with Ibrahim in tow, aiming to challenge Jamsheed's rule. However, this move alarmed Burhan Nizam Shah I of Ahmadnagar who feared Kasim's growing ambitions. Burhan intervened by marching towards Golkonda to support Jamsheed Quli Qutub Shah, capturing Koheer in the Barid territory along the way. Kasim Barid abandoned his campaign and retreated towards Bijapur.

Burhan Nizam Shah I of Ahmadnagar, having found refuge and support, formed a coalition of Deccan powers against his rival, Ibrahim Adil Shah I of Bijapur. Capitalizing on Ibrahim's strained relations with neighboring rulers, Burhan rallied Ahmadnagar, Golkonda, and Vijayanagar into a formidable alliance. Rama Raya of Vijayanagar, eager to settle old disputes with Ibrahim supported the alliance. A coordinated strategy was devised Vijayanagar would strike Bijapur from the south, Golkonda would invade from the east, while Burhan Nizam Shah I, Ali Barid Shah I of Bidar, and Khwaja Jahan would launch simultaneous attacks from the north-east.

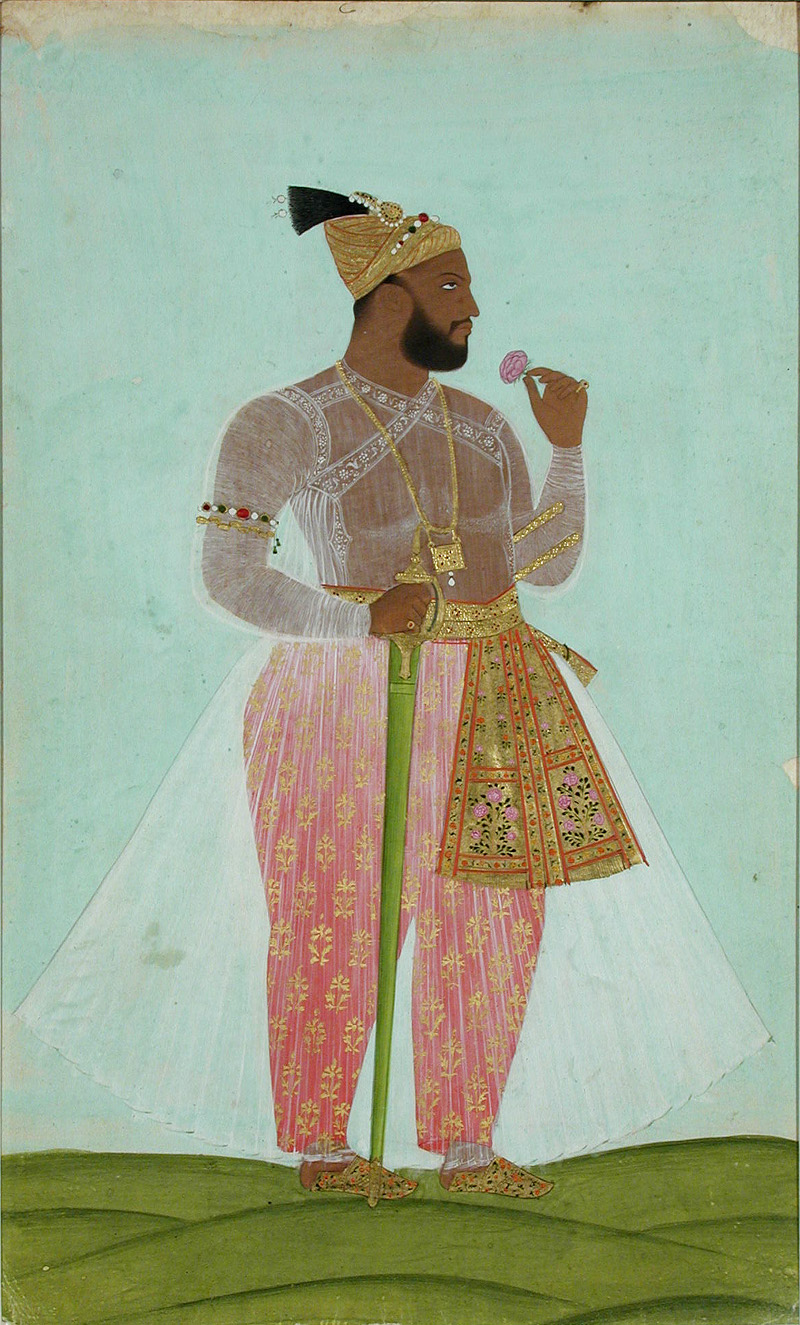
Ali Barid Shah of Bidar

== Campaign ==
Acting on the alliance's plan, Burhan Nizam Shah I launched a series of campaigns, devastating Bijapur territories and repeatedly defeating its forces. He advanced toward Sholapur, leaving a trail of destruction. Meanwhile, Jamsheed of Golkonda captured Kakni extended his control to the outskirts of Gulbarga and laid siege to Etgeer. Rama Raya, to secure the Vijayanagar front, dispatched Venkatadri with a formidable army to capture Raichur and assert control over the strategic Raichur Doab region. Venkatadri confronted Ibrahim Adil Shah's forces near the Bhima River and emerged victorious, driving the Bijapur Sultan from the battlefield. This battle was celebrated in the Narasabupaliyam records.

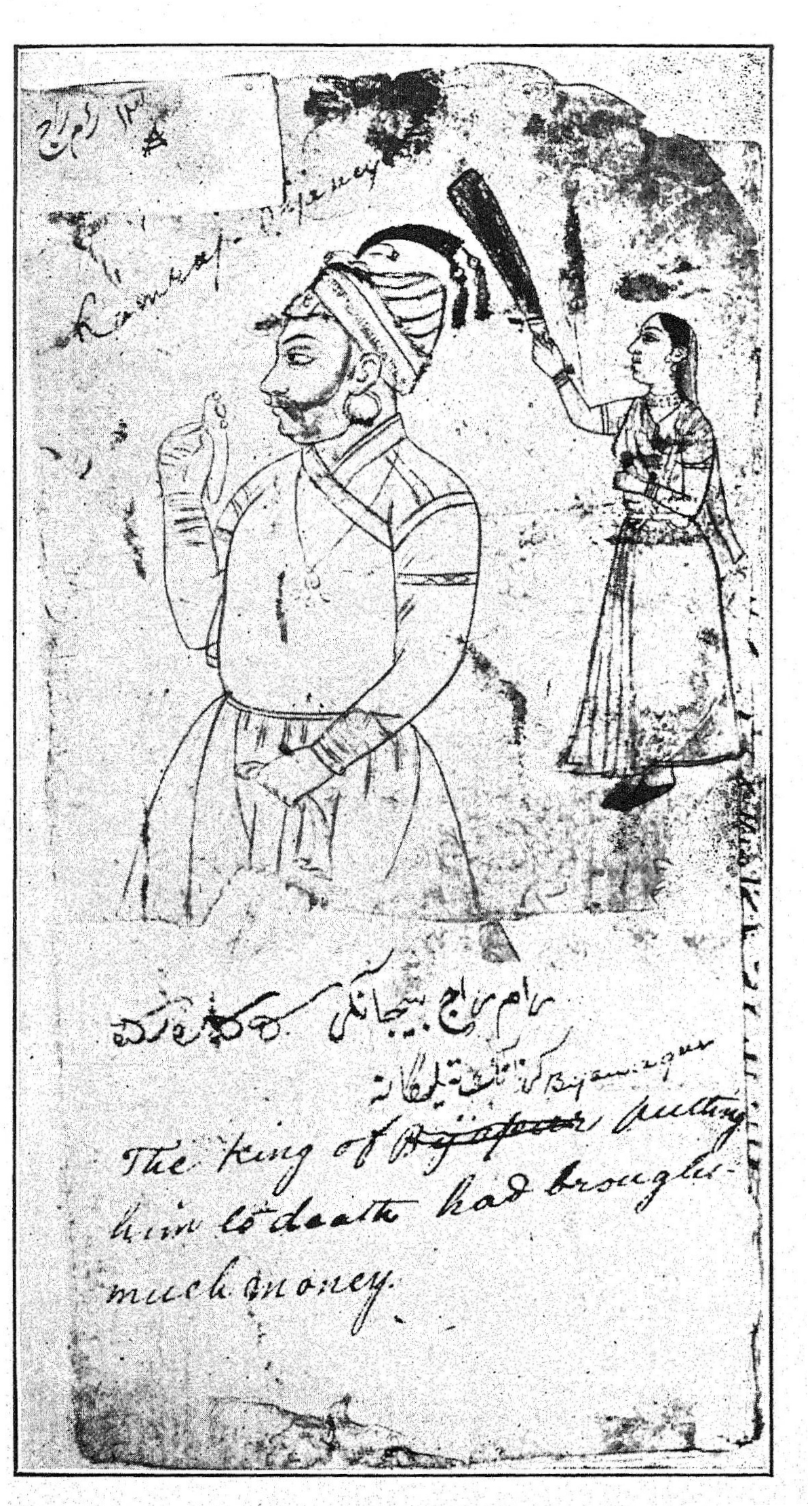
Rama Raya of Vijayanagara

Faced with the overwhelming threat posed by the three allied armies, Ibrahim Adil Shah I of Bijapur and his ally, Kasim Bareed, sought to divert attention from their beleaguered territories. They launched a campaign against Paranda Fort a strategic fortress on the Nizam Shahi frontier, laying siege to it. This strategy proved effective, compelling Burhan Nizam Shah I and his northern allies to redirect their forces to relieve Paranda, easing the pressure on Sholapur. However, as Ibrahim and Kasim Bareed attempted to block their adversaries' advance at Khaspur, they suffered a defeat. Their combined forces were driven from the field.

Ibrahim Adil Shah I was forced to abandon his heavy baggage and camp equipment in a desperate retreat. Kasim Bareed, fleeing towards Bidar faced pursuit by his rival Jamsheed who chased him to the very gates of the city. This marked a critical moment for Bijapur on the brink of collapse. Had the allied forces of Ahmadnagar, Golkonda, and Vijayanagar maintained their cohesion a little longer, they could have delivered a decisive blow to Ibrahim Adil Shah I, potentially dismantling Bijapur's sovereignty and dividing its territories among themselves.

Jamsheed Quli Qutub Shah’s unexpected withdrawal. Whether driven by his self-interest, the king of Golkonda abandoned the campaign and returned to his kingdom, enriched by looting Kasim Bareed. This abrupt departure disrupted the confederate army giving Ibrahim Adil Shah a much needed reprieve. Alarmed by the precarious situation and uncertain about his next steps, Ibrahim Adil Shah I urgently summoned his trusted minister Asad Khan from Belgaum to seek guidance.

Following the advice of his minister, Asad Khan, Ibrahim Adil Shah I adopted a strategy to divide his enemies. Recognizing Burhan Nizam Shah I as his most formidable adversary, he offered the Sholapur districts as a peace settlement. Burhan Nizam Shah I satisfied with his gains and with the monsoon season approaching, agreed to suspend hostilities. Similarly Rama Raya was presented with gifts to placate him. Isolated by the withdrawal of his allies and faced with unrest among subordinate chiefs within the Vijayanagar Empire Rama Raya had little choice but to accept the terms and abandon the Bijapur campaign.

== Aftermath ==
After separately negotiating peace with Burhan Nizam Shah I and Rama Raya Ibrahim Adil Shah turned his attention to Jamsheed Quli Qutb Shah of Golkonda whose invasion had inflicted significant damage on his realm. Ibrahim Adil Shah I launched a campaign, reclaiming key territories such as Kalyani and Udgir before advancing to Golkonda. Under the leadership of Asad Khan, the Bijapur forces engaged in a fierce battle near the walls of Golkonda. During the conflict, Asad Khan personally dueled with Jamsheed Quli Qutb Shah, disfiguring the king in combat. The Golkonda forces suffered a defeat, forcing Jamsheed to sue for peace.

== See also ==
- Ahmednagar Sultanate
- Vijaynagar Empire
- Golconda Sultanate
