= Battle of the Tungabhadra River =

Battle of Thungabadra River
- Part of Vijayanagar Civil War (1542-1543)
Date	1543
Location	Tungabhadra River, India
Result	Rama Raya victory

Belligerents
Aliya Rama Raya's Faction	Salakamraju dodda Tirumala's Faction

Commanders and leaders
Sadasiva Raya; Aliya Rama Raya; Tirumala Deva Raya; Hande Hanumappa Nayaka; Venkatadri	Salakamraju Chikka Tirumala (executed)

The Battle of the Tungabhadra River marked the last battle of a series of conflicts in the Vijayanagar Civil War (1542-1543) between Salakamraju Tirumala and Rama Raya. This decisive battle ended with the capture of Tirumala, whose forces were outmaneuvered and betrayed by his own captains. Following his capture, Tirumala was executed, bringing an end to his resistance. With the rival faction defeated, the queens of Krishnadevaraya Tirumala Devi and Chinnadevi, joyfully opened the gates of the capital to Rama Raya and his victorious army. Soon after, Rama Raya orchestrated the coronation of Sadasiva Raya as emperor, solidifying his position as the empire's de facto ruler.

== Background ==
By the middle of 1543, Rama Raya advanced upon Vijayanagara after completing extensive preparations, reaching the vicinity of the capital around Bhadrapada of Sobhakrit S. 1465. An inscription at Nittar in Bellary taluka sheds light on the political and religious activities during this period. It records a double grant made by Sadasiva Raya on Rama Raya's behalf one to the deity Vitthaladeva at Nittur in Tekkala-kota sima for the merit of Achyuta Deva Raya, and another sarvamanya grant to Madanur Chanda Vinayaka to secure Rama Raya's spiritual merit. This demonstrates Rama Raya and Sadasiva's close proximity to the capital and their active governance. Salakaraju Tirumala recognizing the looming threat to his position and safety, grew increasingly desperate. In an attempt to counter Rama Raya's advance, he sought the aid of Ibrahim Adil Shah I. In exchange for military assistance, Tirumala promised to acknowledge Adil Shah’s suzerainty and pay a substantial sum of three lakhs of hoons for each day's march of the Sultan's army.

The offer made by the desperate Salakaraju Tirumala to Ibrahim Adil Shah I was highly enticing, promising suzerainty and substantial monetary rewards. Persuaded by Asad Khan, his most influential minister, the Sultan accepted the proposal and marched from his capital toward Vijayanagara. The journey faced no opposition, and upon his arrival, he was welcomed by Tirumala, who personally escorted him into the city. In a symbolic gesture of allegiance, Tirumala seated Ibrahim Adil Shah I on the royal throne, signifying his submission. To honor the Sultan’s arrival, Tirumala organized a grand festival that lasted several days, demonstrating both his gratitude and his political strategy to secure support against Rama Raya's advancing forces.

Tirumala's decision to align with Ibrahim Adil Shah I deeply alienated the Vijayanagara nobles, who were horrified by the memory of past atrocities committed by the Muhammadans. Feeling betrayed and powerless to openly resist, the nobles adopted a strategy of feigned contrition. They sent letters to Tirumala, expressing regret for their rebellion and pledging eternal loyalty to him, on the condition that he convince his Muhammadan ally to withdraw to Bijapur. Rama Raya recognizing the political tension, also provided a separate assurance to Tirumala. He vowed to remain loyal forever if Tirumala ensured the retreat of Ibrahim Adil Shah I to his own kingdom.

Convinced of Rama Raya's and the nobles' sincerity in their renewed pledges of loyalty, Tirumala Raya decided he no longer needed the support of his Muhammadan ally. To honor their agreement, he paid Ibrahim Adil Shah I a substantial subsidy of fifty lakhs of hoons and presented him with additional valuable gifts as a gesture of goodwill. Satisfied with the arrangement, the Adil Shah began his retreat towards his frontier, withdrawing his entire army.

The departure of Ibrahim Adil Shah I marked a turning point, as it unleashed widespread rebellion against Tirumala. Rama Raya along with the majority of the nobles who had professed loyalty to him, broke their promises and began preparing for a decisive march upon Vijayanagara to punish Tirumala for his perceived betrayal. The political tide turned rapidly against him, as even some of his most loyal generals began to desert, leaving his military strength in decline. Recognizing the urgency of the situation, Tirumala resolved to confront his enemies in a final battle before his forces completely disbanded. Gathering whatever troops he could muster, he took command personally and advanced to the banks of the Tungabhadra where he set up camp.

== Battle ==
While stationed at Adoni or nearby, Rama Raya deployed spies to monitor Tirumala's movements and undermine the loyalty of his troops. These spies infiltrated Tirumala's camp, spreading rumors that their leader, despite his wealth, was merely a shepherd by caste and unworthy of allegiance. To further sow dissent, they offered bribes to Tirumala’s captains on Rama Raya's behalf, causing many to contemplate desertion. With Tirumala’s forces demoralized and divided, Rama Raya seized the opportunity to launch a sudden and decisive attack on his camp, catching him completely off guard. As his captains abandoned him, Tirumala saw no option but to flee with a few retainers. However, Rama Raya's officers soon caught up with him, and Tirumala was promptly beheaded. His severed head was displayed on a flagstaff, a stark and public declaration of his defeat and punishment for betrayal.

== Aftermath ==
Following the victory at the Tungabhadra Rama Raya ordered his troops to march upon the capital. News of Tirumala's defeat reached Vijayanagara well before the arrival of the victorious army, causing great rejoicing. Tirumaladevi and Chinnadevi, the queens of the late Krishnadevaraya, elated by the triumph, instructed Tirumala's ministers to surrender the city. The ministers promptly complied, paving the way for Rama Raya's forces to enter unopposed. Shortly thereafter, Sadasiva Raya the newly declared sovereign, accompanied by his powerful regent Rama Raya made a grand and triumphant entry into the capital. According to inscriptions, this occurred on Kartika Shukla 11 of the cyclic year Shobhakrit (Saka 1465). Sadasiva Raya’s coronation followed soon after, celebrated with great splendor and festivity.

== See also ==
- Ibrahim Adil Shah I
- Pemmasani Erra Timmanayudu
- Vijayanagar Civil War (1542-1543)
