= Battle of Juturu =

- Part of Vijayanagar Civil War (1542-1543)
Date	1542
Location	Juturu, Andhra Pradesh, India
Result	Rama Raya victory

Belligerents
Aliya Rama Raya's Faction	Salakamraju Pedda Tirumala's Faction

Commanders and leaders
Sadasiva Raya; Aliya Rama Raya; Tirumala Deva Raya; Venkatadri; Pemmasani Erra Timmanayudu; Ramaraja Tirumala; Akkaya Cina Timma Nayaka	Salakamraju Tirumala; Salakaya

The Battle of Juturu was a significant battle between Aliya Rama Raya and the forces of Salakamraju Tirumala, commanded by his general, Salakaya. Determined to block Rama Raya's advance, Salakaya assembled his troops and prepared for battle. Despite his efforts, Salakaya's army was defeated, clearing the way for Rama Raya's continued his march towards Kurnool.

== Background ==
As Rama Raya's army advanced, Salakamraju Tirumala actively rallied his allies to resist the invasion. Chintagunti Raghupati, the chief of Bethamcherla attempted to halt their progress but was decisively defeated and forced to retreat into his fortress. Cina Timma Nayaka led a determined siege, capturing the stronghold and razing it to the ground. After clearing the enemy from the hilly regions around Awaku, Rama Raya’s forces moved northward, pressing their campaign towards Kurnool.

== Battle ==
Rama Raya's presence in the Kurnool region during 1542-1543 is attested by two inscriptions at Srisailam and Gadirevula. At Juturu, his advance was challenged by Salakaya Tirumala, who assembled his troops to block the path and offered battle to Rama Raya's army. However, Salakaya was defeated and forced to retreat. With the obstacle removed, Rama Raya proceeded to Kurnool his ancestral seat.

== Aftermath ==
Though defeated at the Battle of Juturu, Salakaya Tirumala was not entirely destroyed and retreated with the remnants of his army to Bedagallu, his jagir in the Adavani province.

== See also ==
- Rama Raya
- Tirumala Deva Raya
- Vijayanagar Civil War (1542–1543)
