= Bellary Fort =

Heritage site

- Part of Bellary
- Bellary, karnataka, India
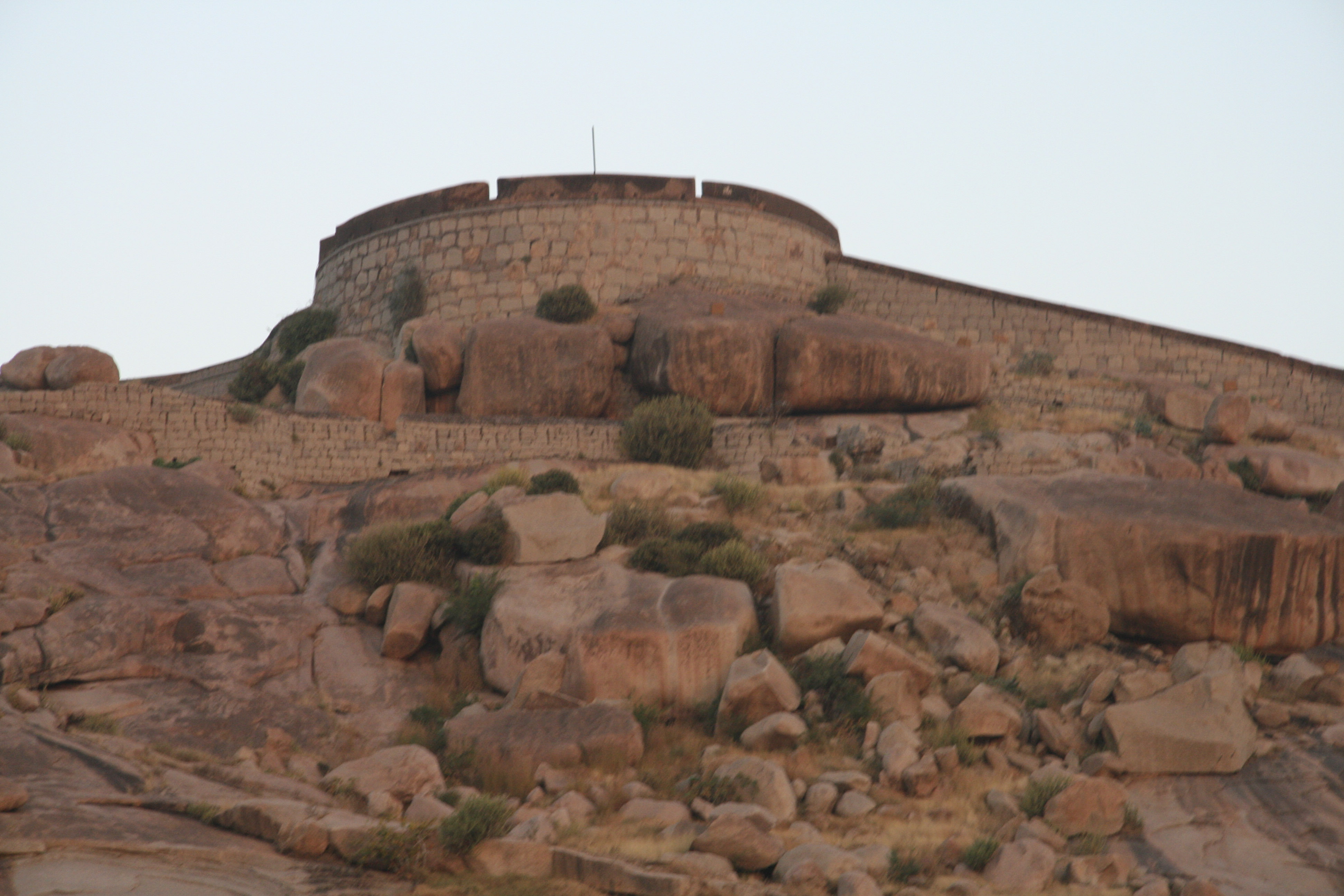
- Ramparts of the Fort

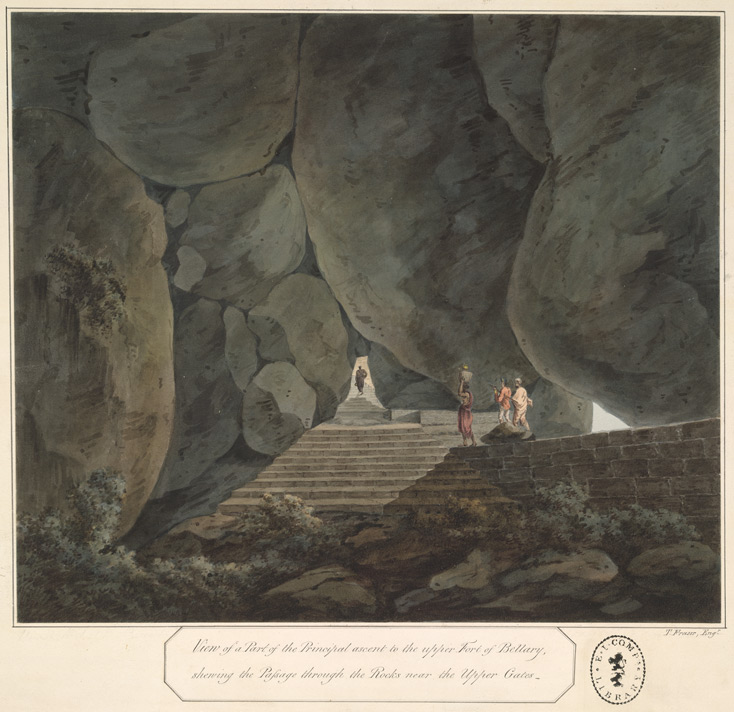
- Rock-scattered passage to Upper Fort

Site information
- Type: Fort
- Controlled by: Government of Karnataka
- Open to the public: Yes
- Condition: Ruins

Location
- Coordinates: 15.15°N 76.933°E

Site history
- Built: 16th century
- Built by: Hanumappa Nayakar, feudatory of Vijaynagar Empire,
- Materials: Granite Stones and mud
- Battles/wars: Several

Bellary Fort ("Bellary Kote") was built on top of a hill called the "Ballari Gudda" or the Fort Hill. It is situated in the historic city of Bellary, in the Bellary district, in Karnataka state, India. It was built in two parts, namely the Upper Fort and the Lower Fort. The Upper Fort was built by Hanumappa Nayaka, a feudatory of the Vijayanagara Empire. It was the official residence of the Hande family. The Lower Fort was built by Hyder Ali in the latter part of the 18th century.

A French engineer was the architect and builder of the Lower Fort. He also refurbished the Upper Fort. After the forts were completed, Haider Ali found that the forts built were at a lower elevation vis-a-vis an opposite hill called the 'Kumbara Gudda', thus putting the new forts militarily at a strategic disadvantage. As a result, Haider Ali was annoyed with this lapse, and it is said that he ordered the hanging of the French engineer at the east gate of the fort. The French engineer's grave, dated 1769 (inscribed as unknown French Engineer), is located at the east gate of the fort and has been preserved due to efforts of local Muslims who also claim that it was the tomb that belonged to a Muslim saint.

The forts have fine ramparts with a rich history with several historical and religious monuments. A citadel was in the upper fort with several ancient tanks while the lower fort on the east housed the arsenal.

== Legends ==
There are several legends attributed to Bellary, the city where the fort is located.

A mythological legend states that the city is named after Indra, the king of gods, who destroyed the Rakshasa (demon) ‘'Balla'’ who resided in that place.

Another ancient legend links this place to some events in the epic Ramayana. It is said that Rama while searching for Sita met Sugreeva and Hanuman at a place near Hampi, 30 kilometres (19 mi), from Bellary, the celebrated capital of the Vijayanagara Empire.

The historically linked legend states that Bellary is the name derived from the old Telugu word "Vallari" and "Vallapuri". An inscription from the time of the rule of Ganga Dynasty of Talakad, testifies to the territory of Sindha Vishaya, which today consists of Bellary and Dharwad districts. In the Hoysala period, the dynasty of "Bellariya Naredu" had sovereignty over Bellary when it was known as Kuntala Desha, though it subsequently came to be known by the name 'Vallari-Vallapuri'.

== Geography ==
The fort and the town are located around two prominent and large rocky granite hills: the Ballari Gudda (ಬಳ್ಳಾರಿ ಗುಡ್ಡ) (with the fort built on this hill) and Kumbara Gudda (ಕುಂಬಾರ ಗುಡ್ಡ) (Gudda means "hill" in Kannada). The two hills provide the dominant backdrop to the city, and can be seen from all parts of the city. Apart from these two hills, there are smaller hills such as the Kaate Gudda (ಕಾಟೇ ಗುಡ್ಡ) (near the present Municipal Junior College), the Eeshwara Gudda (ಈಶ್ವರ ಗುಡ್ಡ) (behind the Anaadi Lingeshwara Temple), one hill adjacent to the St. John's High School in the Fort Area and another hill near to the Bellary Central Jail. The fort located on the Ballari Gudda, on a spur of the Sandur range at the border of Karnataka and Andhra Pradesh has abundant granite outcrops. There is hardly any vegetation on the barren rocky countryside. The fort has a commanding view of the plains that form the present day Bellary town. The terrain in and around the Bellary fort consists of granite rocks, which rises suddenly above the plains in the form of a very large mountain. The semi-elliptical shape of the hill has a longer northern side vis-a-vis the southern side. The rock formations consist of a mixture of granite with felspar in large rhomboidal prismatic form. This type of rock creates a strong reflection of the Sun's rays causing very hot climatic conditions in the fort and the town (Bellary is considered one of the hottest places in India). The climatic condition of the place is explained as hot and arid, but is stated to be healthy weather.

== History ==
Bellary town and the district has a hoary history dating from 300 BC till 1365 AD, the beginning of the Vijayanagar empire. It was ruled by Mauryas, Satavahanas, Kadambas, Chalukyas of Kalyana, Kalachuryas, Sevunas and Hoysalas. But the specific history of the fort (Upper Fort) starts with the rule of the chieftain named Hanumappa Nayaka, a feudatory of the Vijayanagar empire, who built the Upper Fort. With the fall of the Vijayanagar empire in 1565, the area witnessed political upheaval till the British took control of the region, around 1800 AD. The region subsequently came under the control of the Bijapur Sultans. Shivaji, who during one of his campaigns was passing through the fort seized the fort, in 1678, as some of his advance scouting parties were ambushed by the garrison stationed in the fort. He later restored the fort on condition of tribute payment. Under force, in 1761, the fort came under the control of Basalat Jung of Adoni. The Nayaka chieftain of the fort quarrelled with Basalat Jung and refused to pay the tribute money. The Nayaka sought the help of Haider Ali of Mysooru (Mysore) to attack the Adoni Sultan. Haider Ali convincingly defeated the Adonis. But subsequently, Haider Ali himself usurped the fort and the region. It was during his time that the Upper Fort was restored and the Lower Fort was newly constructed with the help of a French engineer.

Bellary was a stronghold of Haidar Ali after he overthrew the local chieftains. He surprised the forces sent by Nizam under the military command of a Frenchman named M. de Lally and besieged the fort and took total control. But after the defeat of Tipu Sultan, Hyder Ali's son, at the hands of the British during the Third Anglo-Mysore War, the territory was divided and the Bellary district with the fort was given to the then Nizam Salabat Jang. After the defeat and death of Tippu Sultan in 1799 in the Fourth Anglo-Mysore War at Srirangapattanam (Seringapatam), the Mysore territories were further divided up between the Wodeyars, Asaf Jah II and the British. In 1796 AD, Asaf Jah II, harassed by the Marathas and Tipu Sultan, had opted to get British military protection under Lord Wellesley's doctrine of Subsidiary Alliance. Now, as part of this agreement, the Asif Jah II ceded a large portion of the acquired territory, including Bellary, to the British, to be added to the Madras Presidency as 'Bellary District'. This area was also known as the Ceded Districts (see map at), a term constantly used then for the areas, and was considerably larger than the present district, including the present districts of Kadapa (Cuddapah), Anantapuram and much of Karnoolu (Kurnool). This was also a deal or an agreement that was meant to compensate the company for the expenses they incurred to maintain the British Subsidiary Force at Hyderabad.

The fort was classified as 1st class by the British Administration. This fort gave Bellary its ancient importance, and led to its selection by the British rulers as the site of a cantonment.

Muzzaffar Khan, the Nawab of Kurnool, was confined here from 1823 to 1864 for the murder of his wife.

== Fort structure ==
Artist's views of Bellary Fort in the 19th century
N. and E. faces of the citadel at Bellary; Hindus worshipping at a shrine in the foreground	Bellary Rock and Fort

The fort has two parts, one is the ancient Upper Fort built during the Vijayanagar reign and the other is the Lower Fort built during Haider Ali's rule. The Upper Fort was called the Fort Hill. The Lower Fort was called the Face Hill, since some of the rocks in the fort area resembled the face of a human being.

The Upper Fort (15.148°N 76.9108°Ewikimapia) houses the citadel, at the summit of the spur of the Ballar Gudda with a three-tier fortification, one below the other. It is at an elevation 1,976 feet (602 m) m.s.l. It is quadrangular in plan, with a circumference of about 1.5 miles (2.4 km), and rises by about 460 ft (140 m) above the plains below; it can be accessed only through a winding rocky path amongst scattered boulders, which was considered impregnable. On the top, outside the citadel, is a small temple, the remains of some cells and several deep pools of water. Within the citadel, there are several strongly constructed buildings, and an ample water supply from reservoirs constructed in the clefts of the rocks. There are no garrisons in this fort. It contains several cisterns, which have been excavated in the rocks to provide for water storage. Outside the turreted ramparts is a ditch and a covered passage. The main turret on the east currently features a huge mural of the Indian Flag, facing east.

The Lower fort, (15.1453°N 76.9158°E wikimapia), located at the eastern base of the rock, is about 0.5 miles (0.80 km) in diameter. It probably had an arsenal and barracks in the past. The fort structure is encircled by ramparts with numerous bastions surrounded by a deep ditch and glacis. The lower fort has two entrance gates; one on the western end and the other on the eastern side. Just outside the eastern gate of the lower fort is a temple dedicated to Hanuman – the Kote Anjaneya Temple (Kote (ಕೋಟೆ) – fort in Kannada). In the past. the lower fort was inhabited by people who had flocked here seeking protection. During the British period, more buildings were added namely the Commissariat stores, the Protestant church, orphanage, Masonic lodge, post-office, and numerous private dwellings. At present, it houses a number of public buildings, offices, educational institutions, temples and churches.

The impressive fort is illuminated during Sundays and holidays of state and national importance.

== Access ==
The fort is well connected by road, rail and air transport facilities linking all parts of the country; all linked to the Bellary city where the fort is located.

National Highways (NH 13 & NH 63) and State Highway road networks provide an excellent net work of road communications in the district and to the town. It is located at 300 kilometres (190 mi) from Bangalore, the capital of Karnataka state. Distances to other important towns around Bellary are: Chennai – 304 kilometres (189 mi), Hadagali – 148 kilometres (92 mi), Hospet – 63 kilometres (39 mi), H.B.Halli – 100 kilometres (62 mi), Hampi – 75 kilometres (47 mi), Hyderabad – 367 kilometres (228 mi), Kudligi – 85 kilometres (53 mi), Pune – 336 kilometres (209 mi), Sandur – 63 kilometres (39 mi) and Siriguppa – 60 kilometres (37 mi).

The city has two railway stations, both built during the British rule – the City station (Bellary Junction) and the Cantonment station (Cantonment). Railway links available are the Hubli-Guntakal line and the extended Bellary-Rayadurgam-Chitradurga line and falls under the jurisdiction of South Western Railway. Bellary is also well connected by Rail to Bengaluru, Raichur, Anantapuram, Hindupuram, Tirupati, Hubballi, Guntakal, Vijayawada, Howrah etc. Guntakal is an important junction near Bellary from where trains to Delhi, Chennai, Mumbai and to most of the places in India are available. In the past, during British rule, the Southern Mahratta Railway passed through the town connecting to Madras (now Chennai) via Hubli on the west and Guntakal on the east.

The civilian Bellary Airport is located at the far end of the Cantonment area with regular flights operating from Bangalore and Goa. An air strip located at the Jindal Vijayanagar Steels complex, Toranagallu in Sandur taluk, 40 kilometres (25 mi) from Bellary, is used by private airlines to operate sightseeing charter flights to Hampi and Mysore since October 2002.

== Gallery ==
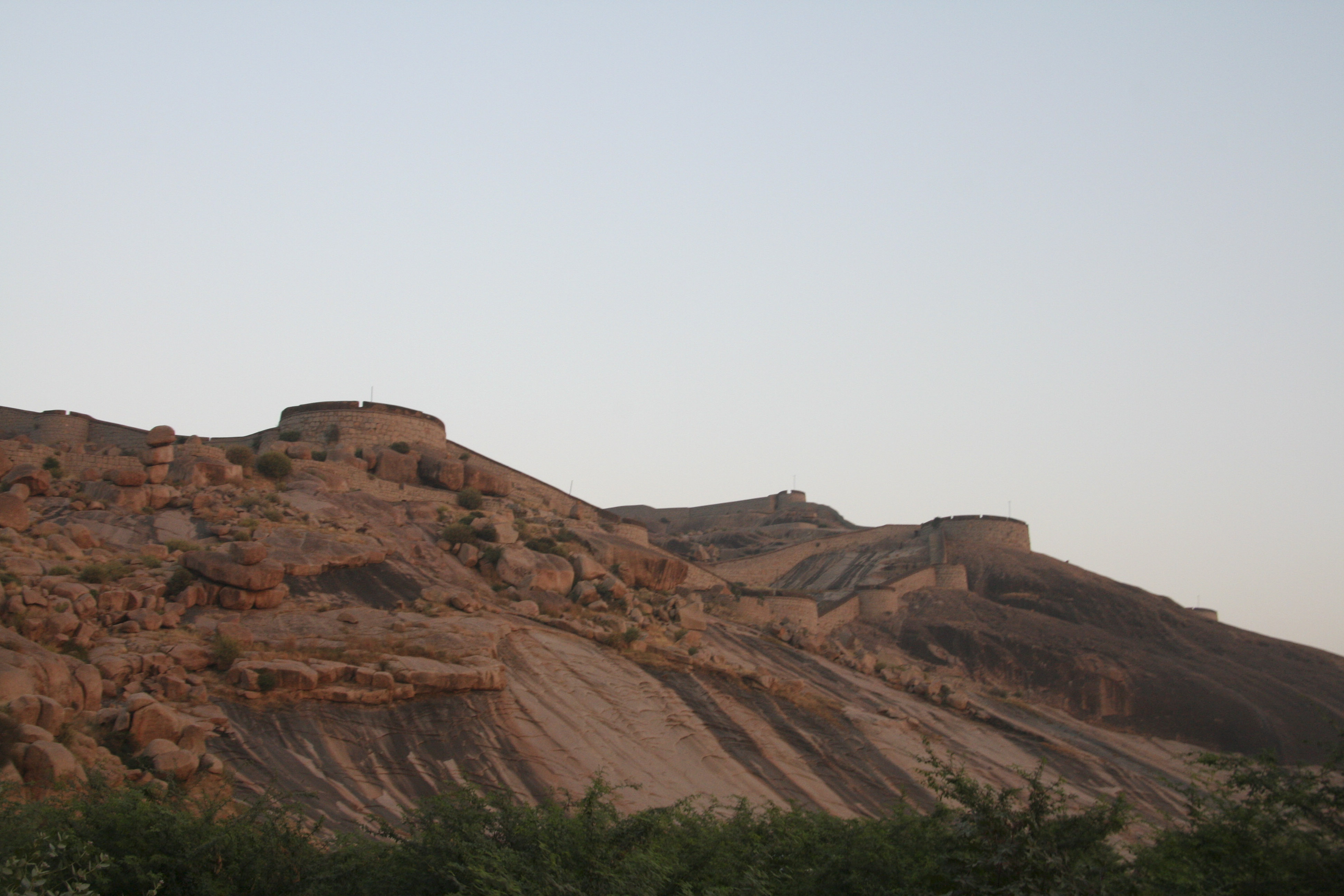
View of Bellary Fort

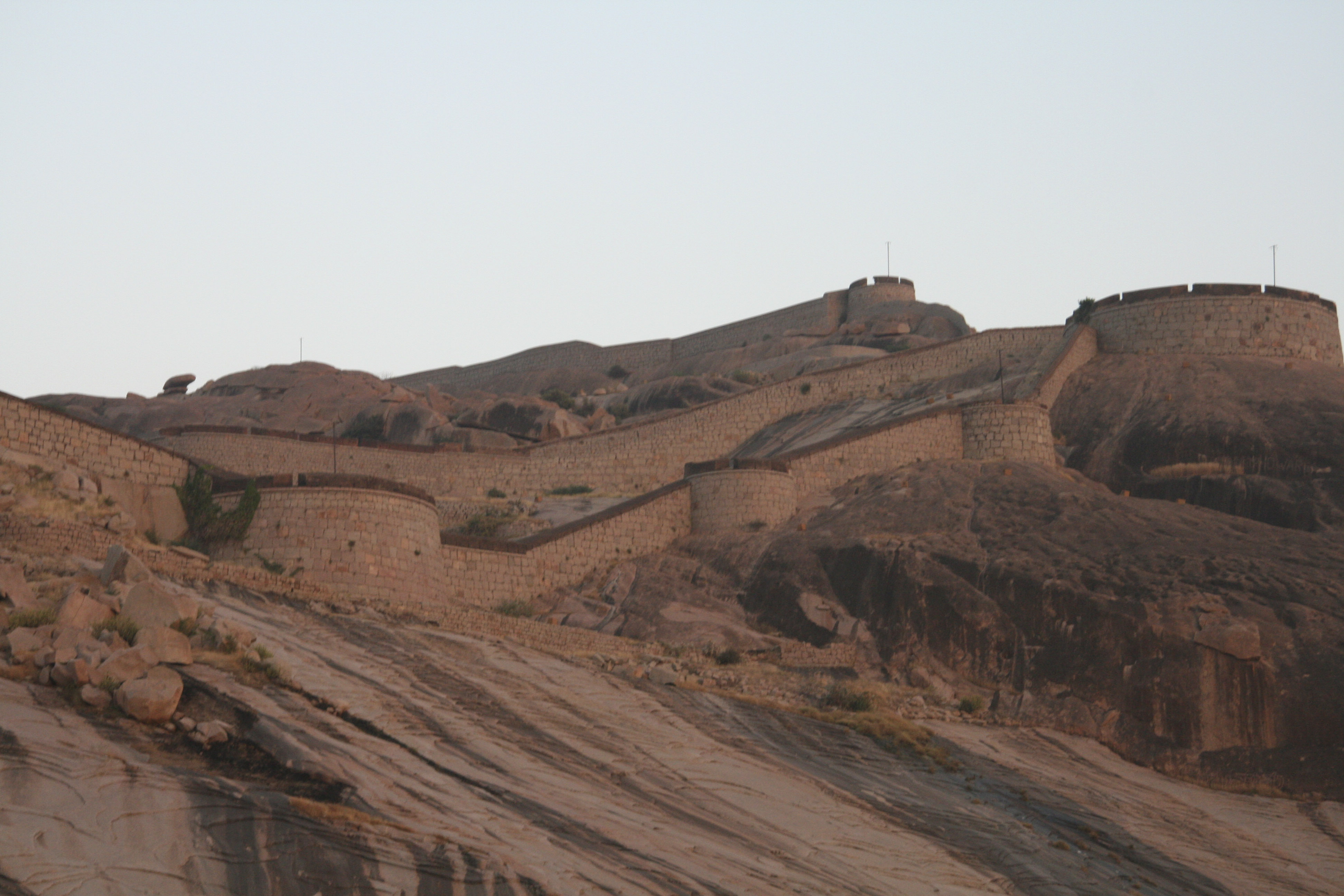
Another view of the Fort

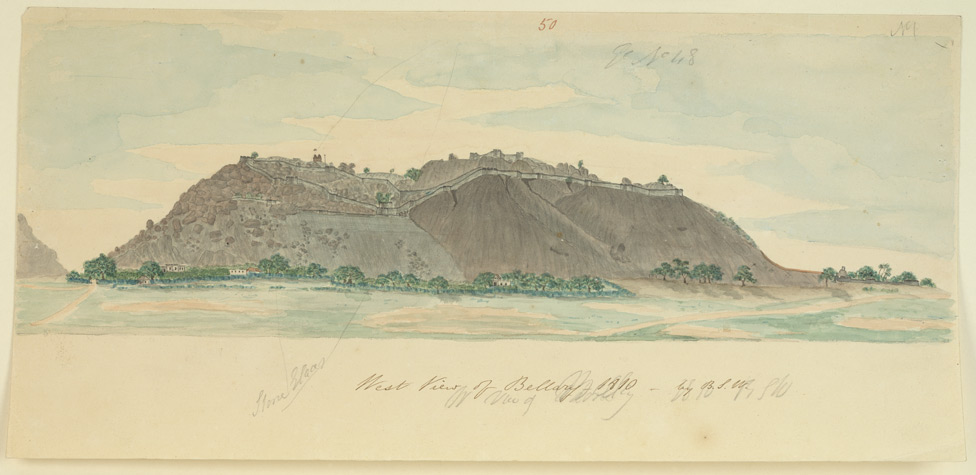
Artist's West View of the Fort

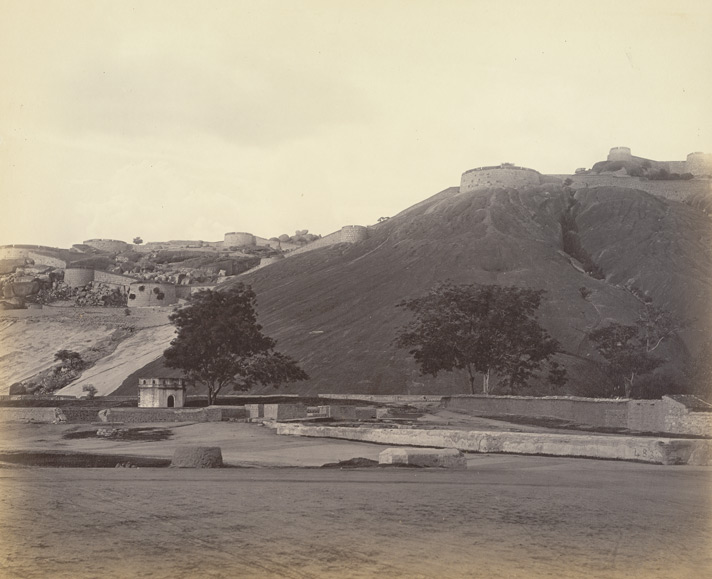
Bellary Rock and fort

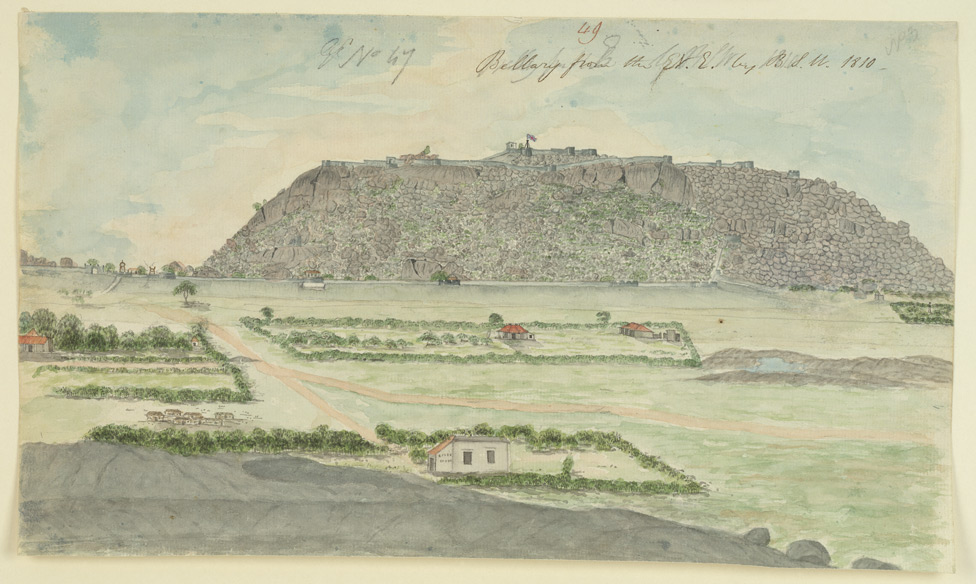
Artist's NE view of the Fort

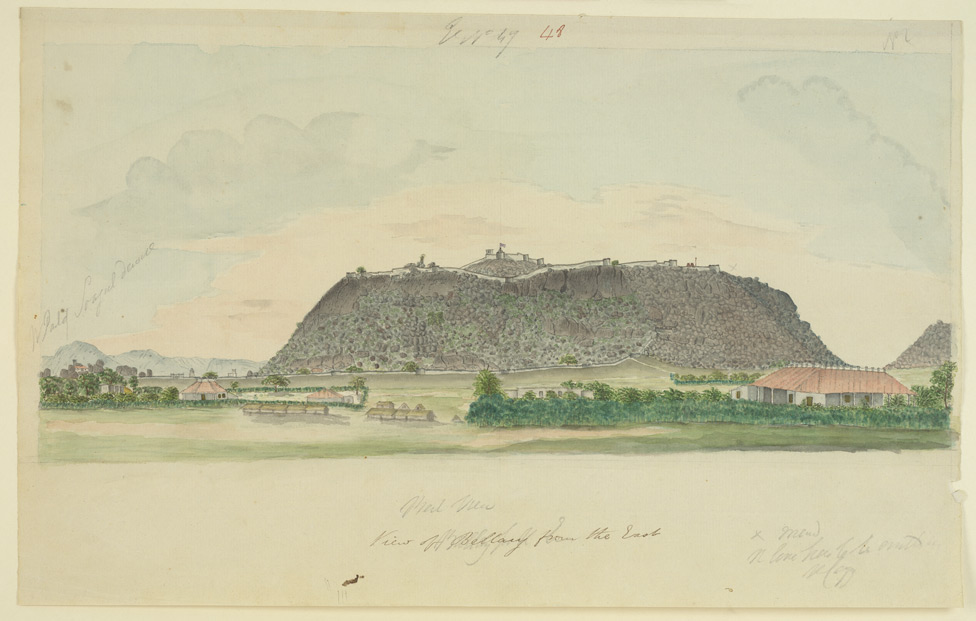
Artist's E view of the Fort

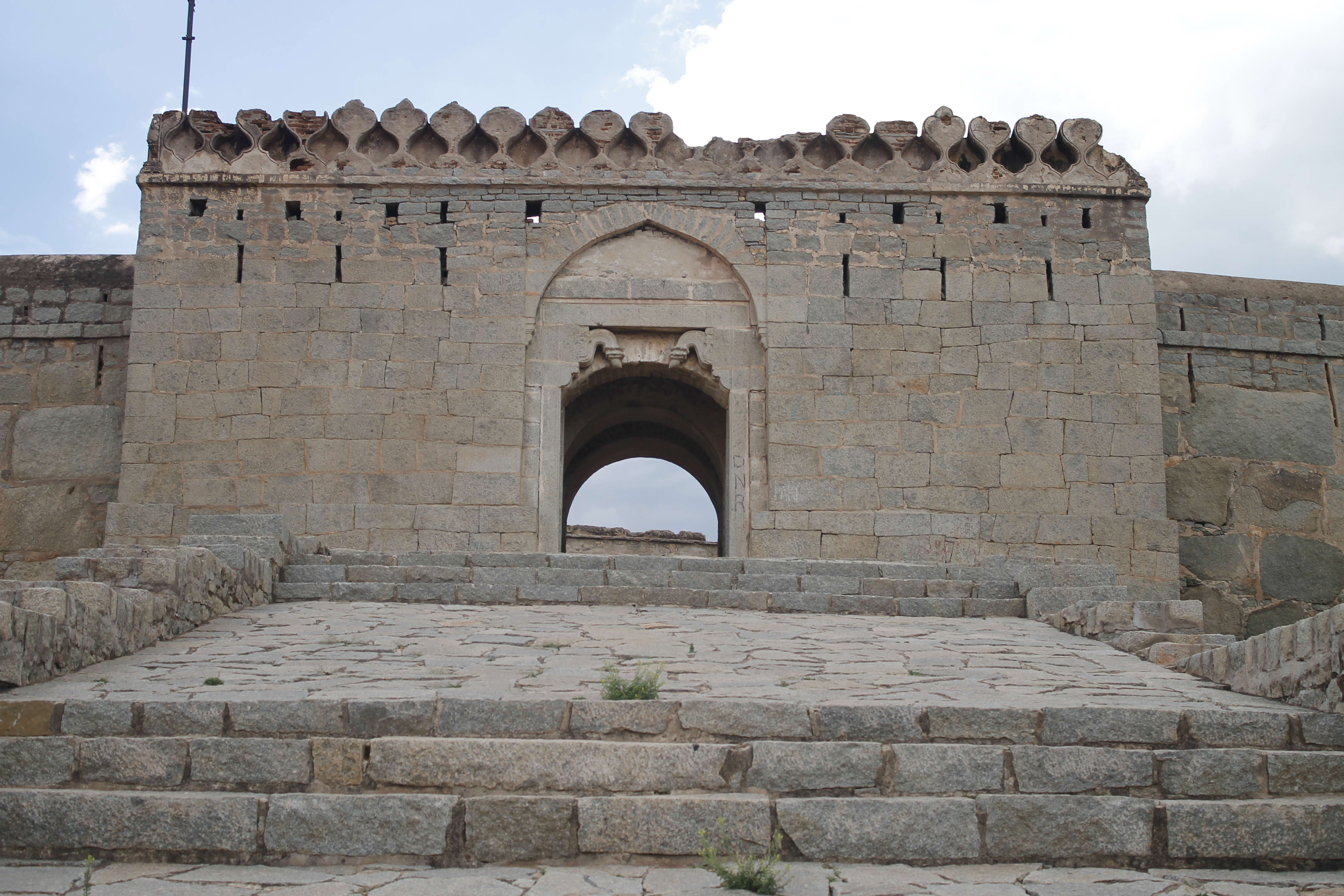
Entrance of Upper Fort

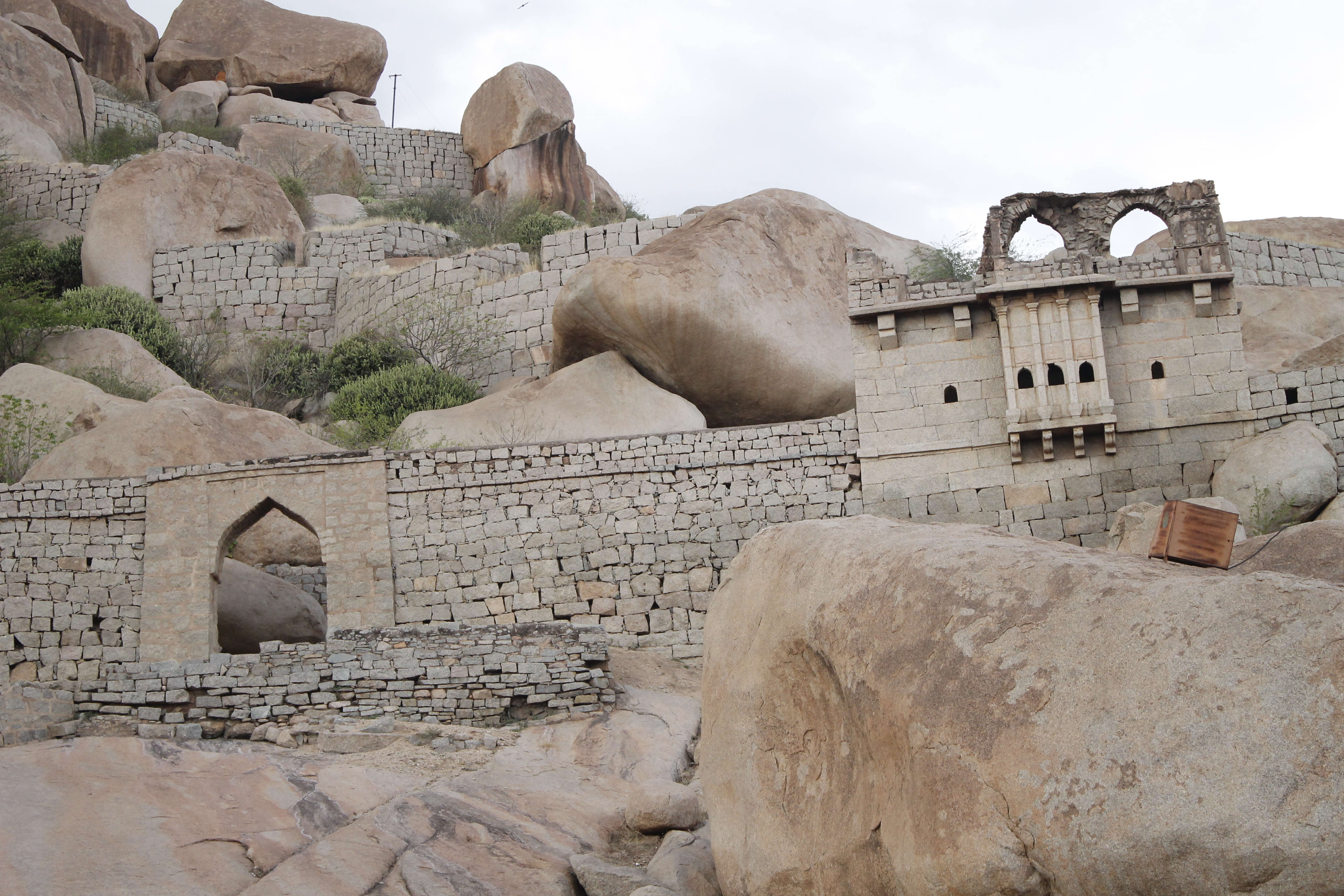
Ballari Fort

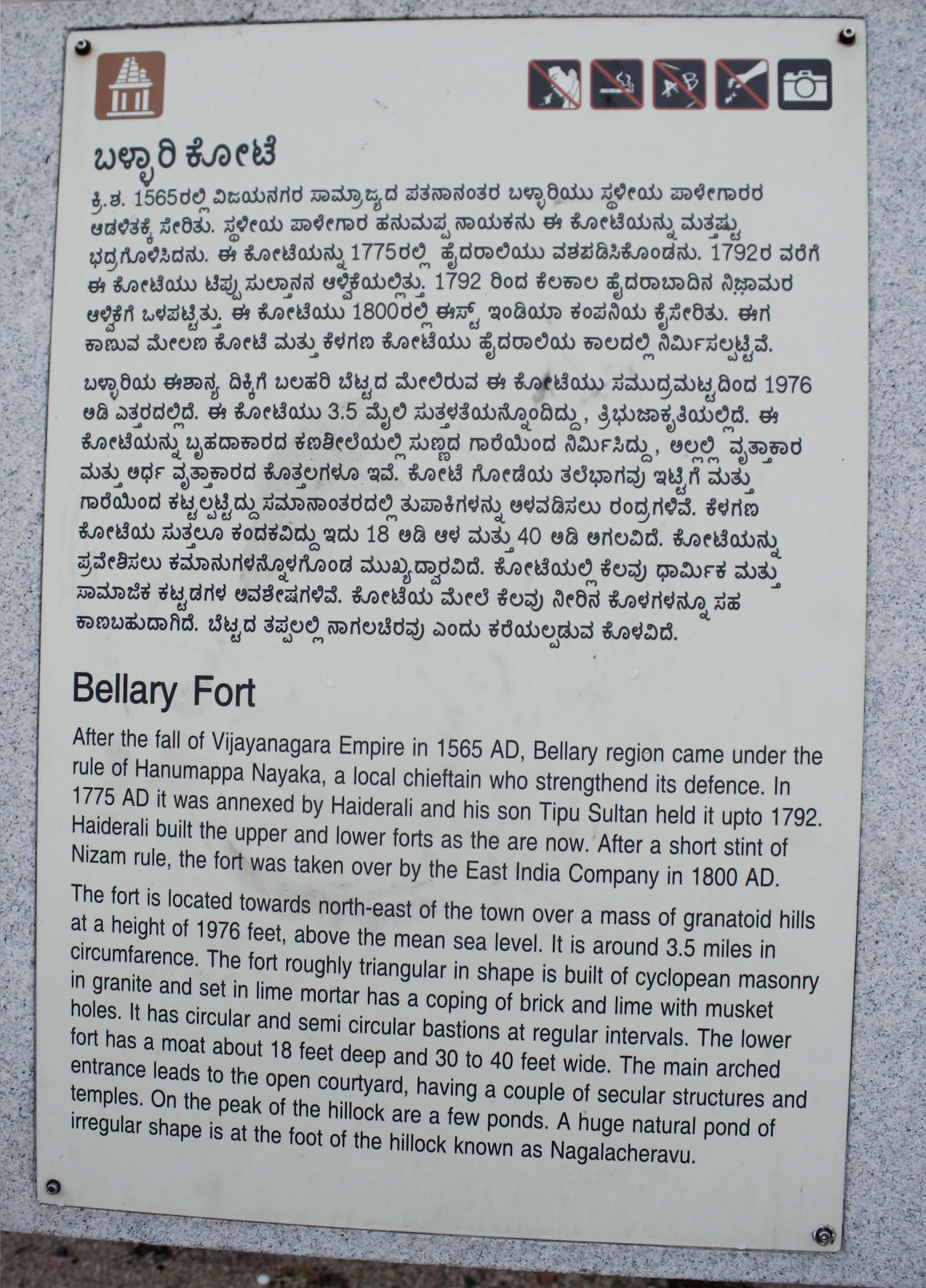
Details about Ballari Fort by Archaeological Survey of India
