= Vijayanagara Civil War (1542–1543) =

1542–1543 conflict in the Vijayanagara Empire

Vijaynagara Civil War
- Part of Aliya Rama Raya's Campaigns
Date	1542–1543
Location	Andhra Pradesh, Karnataka, India
Result	Rama Raya victory

Belligerents
Aliya Rama Raya's Faction	Salakamraju Pedda Tirumala's Faction; Supported by: Bijapur Sultanate

Commanders and leaders
Sadasiva Raya; Aliya Rama Raya; Tirumala Deva Raya; Hande Hanumappa Nayaka; Venkatadri; Pemmasani Ramalinga Nayudu; Pemmasani Erra Timmanayudu; Mesa Peddapa Nayaka; Ramaraju Tirumala; Akkaya Cina Timma Nayaka	Venkata I X Salakamraju Pedda Tirumala †; Salakamraju Chinna Tirumala †; Chintagunti Raghupati; Sanjar Khan; Ibrahim Adil Shah I Asad Khan

The Vijayanagar Civil War (1542–1543) was conflict between Rama Raya and Salakamraju Tirumala, when Salakaraju Tirumala usurped the throne by assassinating Venkata I son of Achyuta Deva Raya. In response, Rama Raya proclaimed the imprisoned Sadasiva Raya as the rightful emperor and led a war to install him to power. After defeating Tirumala in several battles, Rama Raya then defeated Salakamraju Chinna Tirumala at the Battle of the Tungabadhra on the banks of Tungabhadra River killing him. Salakamraju Pedda Tirumala committed suicide in the palace. Rama Raya then entered Vijayanagara and installed Sadasiva Raya as emperor.

== Background ==
The succession of Venkata I son of Achyuta Deva Raya entrusted to the care of his uncle, possibly Ranga, by his late father, Venkata was instead imprisoned by him, as the uncle sought to claim the throne. This usurpation attempt divided the nobility, with Rama Raya and his brothers supporting the uncle, while the Tirumala brothers advocated Venkata's rights as their sister's son. Backed by numerous nobles, the Tirumala brothers demanded Venkata's release and proposed the appointment of two ministers to govern as his regent. However, the uncle refused, fearing a complete loss of power.

The political turmoil in Vijayanagara deepened as many nobles, disillusioned by misrule, retreated to their provinces, assuming independent authority. Concerned for her son Venkata, Queen Mother Varadamba sought the help of Ibrahim Adil Shah I of Bijapur promising great wealth in return. While Ibrahim ostensibly aimed to restore Venkata, his true intention was to seize the kingdom. Encamping near Vijayanagara his advance forced a shift in loyalties among the nobles, who placed Achyuta's brother on the throne to unite against the common enemy. Rama Raya and his lieutenant, Hande Hanumappa Nayaka, successful in repelling Ibrahim's forces, with a substantial bribe from Achyuta's brother also contributing to Bijapur's retreat.

=== Salakam Tirumala conspires to seize power ===
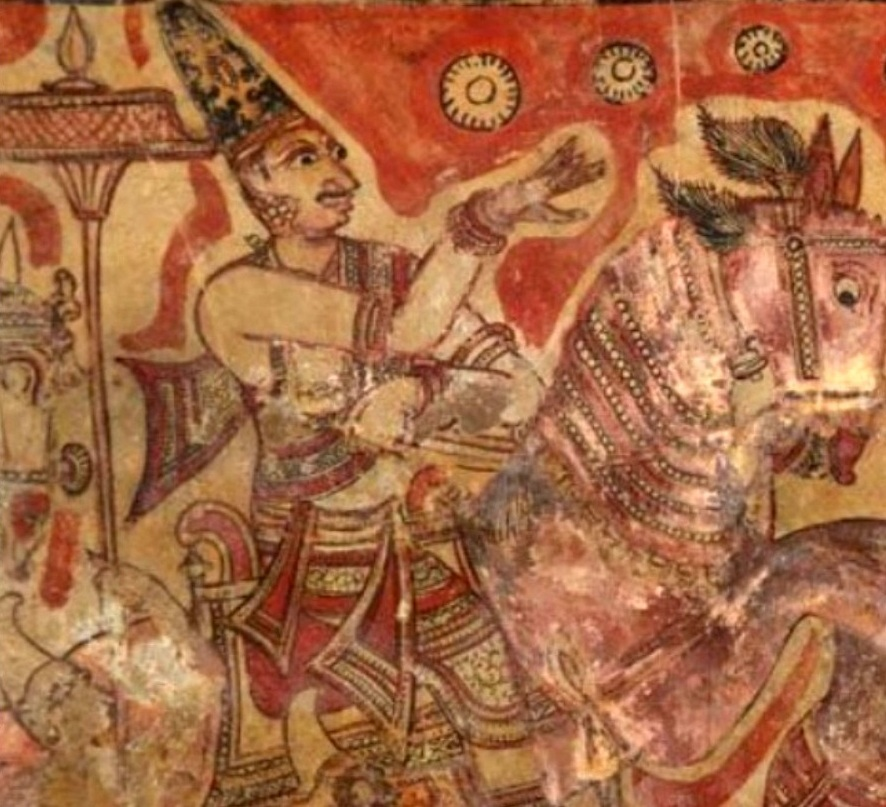
Salakaraju Tirumala depicted in the Tiruppudaimarudur murals, 1600s.

While leading a campaign in Malabar Rama Raya entrusted an agent with guarding the treasury and the imprisoned prince in Vijayanagar. After a successful expedition, Rama Raya faced resistance from a rebel chief near the capital. Prolonged efforts to subdue the fortress exhausted his supplies, prompting him to request funds from his agent. However, the agent, tempted by the treasury's riches, conspired with the Tirumala brothers to seize power. The agent released the imprisoned prince, Venkata, and won over the army with lavish gold, rallying discontented nobles to Venkata's cause. Hearing of these events, Rama Raya hastily made peace with his opponent and marched back to Vijayanagara.

=== Assassination of Venkata I ===
After the crisis subsided, Rama Raya retreated to his estate, waiting for better opportunities. However, Tirumala, driven by ambition, resumed his ruthless quest for power. He had his nephew and sovereign Venkata I strangled, followed by the murder of Achyuta's relatives. Fearing opposition from the nobles, he summoned them to court and blinded those who arrived first. Horrified by his tyranny, the remaining nobles fled to their provinces and sought the aid of Rama Raya and Ibrahim Adil Shah I to overthrow Tirumala and end his oppressive rule.

== War ==
=== Conference at Penukonda ===
Rama Raya seeking to consolidate support against Salaka Tirumala, dispatched royal summons to Hande Hanumappa Nayaka, Mesa Peddappa Nayaka, Majjahari Tulasipati and other jagirdars, commanding them to assemble with their troops. Responding to his call, the leaders, including Mesa Peddappa Nayaka, gathered at Penukonda. Rama Raya recounted Salaka Tirumala's misdeeds and urged their cooperation, promising substantial rewards and titles for their success in defeating the enemy. Mesa Peddappa Nayaka volunteered to gather intelligence on Salaka Timma's movements, deploying spies to secure critical information. Armed with this knowledge Rama Raya alongside the chiefs and their combined forces, rebelled against Salaka Tirumala.

=== Rama Raya captured forts In Rayala Seema ===
The three brothers Rama Raya, Tirumala Deva Raya and Venkatadri rallied the nobles of the kingdom to save the realm from chaos. Since their departure from the capital, their forces swelled as they captured various forts, including Penukonda, Adoni, Gooty, Gandikota, and Kurnool.

=== Battle of Komali ===
Rama Raya arrived with his army at Gandikota, requesting Pemmasani Erra Timmanayudu's support against Salaka Tirumala. Honoring his pledge of loyalty, Timma Nayudu sheltered Rama Raya despite pressure from Vijayanagar nobles, who arrived with large army demanding his surrender. Refusing to handover his guest, Timma Nayudu declared his resolve to fight and rallied an army with support from neighboring palegars. Leading this force alongside Rama Raya he confronted the enemy at Komali. In the ensuing battle, Timma Nayudu's forces decisively defeated the opposing troops, who fled in disarray.

=== Battles of Betamcherla and Juturu ===
Rama Raya's victorious army advanced northward into the Kandanavōlu (Kurnool) province, likely to confront enemy forces stationed in the strategic strongholds of Betamcharla and Juturu. Although the precise sequence of events remains unclear, significant battles occurred near Awuku, the capital of Rama Raja Tirumala, Rama Raya's uncle. Tirumala, credited with saving the kingdom from Salaka Timma's devastation, is believed to have commanded the army, using Awuku as a base for operations. Akkaya Cina Timma Nayaka, a cousin of the Gandikota captain, played a prominent role in the campaign, distinguishing himself in several engagements and contributing to the army's successes.

=== Battle of Bedagllu ===
Despite his defeat at Juturu, Salakaya retreated with his remaining forces to Bedagallu his jagir in the Adavani region. Determined to eliminate the threat, Rama Raya pursued him along the upper course of the Tungabhadra River. Salakaya forced to defend his territory gathered his troops at Bedagallu and prepared for battle. A fierce engagement ensued with both sides fighting valiantly. Ultimately Salakaya's forces were routed fleeing in disarray. Recognizing the futility of further resistance Salakaya likely withdrew to Vijayanagara to align himself with his master.

=== Siege of Adavani ===
Adavani, the last significant stronghold in the region still under Salakarāju Tirumala Raya's control, was entrusted to a skilled Muhammadan officer, Sanjar Khan, for its defense. However, Cina Timma Nayaka led a successful siege, defeating the Khan and his troops. With this victory, the fort fell into Rama Raya's hands consolidating his control over the region.

=== Salakam Tiruamla seeks aid from Ibrahim Adil Shah ===
As Rama Raya advanced toward Vijayanagar, Tirumala, fearing betrayal by his agent, executed him and seized power. Seeking support, Tirumala appealed to Ibrahim Adil Shah I offering vast sums of money and even pledging the empire as a tributary. Enthralled by these terms, Ibrahim marched to Vijayanagar with his general Asad Khan where Tirumala welcomed him lavishly and celebrated his arrival for seven days. Rama Raya avoided open conflict with combined army of Ibrahim Adil Shah I and Salakamraju Tirumala and resorted to diplomacy. Through persuasive letters, he expressed repentance and highlighted the dangers of inviting Muslim forces into their Empire including the defilement of temples and loss of sovereignty. Convinced by these arguments and Rama's pledge of loyalty, Tirumala dismissed the Bijapur forces after paying the promised subsidy of 50 lakhs of hoons and lavish gifts.

=== Battle of Thungabadra River ===
As sultan left the city Rama Raya broke his promise and advanced toward Vijayanagar to punish the salakam tirumala. One of the Tirumala brothers, likely the younger, marched out to confront him on the banks of Thungabadra River. However Chinna Tirumala's army deeming his cause unworthy defected to Rama Raya's side, leading to Chinna Tirumala's capture and execution. Upon hearing of Rama's victory the queens of Krishna Deva Raya ordered the city gates opened to welcome him. The remaining Pedda Tirumala, consumed by despair, inflicted havoc in his final moments blinding the royal elephants, mutilating the horses, and destroying the kingdom's priceless treasures. In a final act of desperation, he took his own life just as Rama's forces entered the palace, marking the end of his rule.

== Aftermath ==
Rama Raya entered Vijayanagar in triumph, reclaiming control of the administration and restoring stability to the kingdom. With the unanimous support of all factions, Sadasiva Raya the son of Achyuta's brother Ranga, was recognized as the rightful heir and ascended the throne of Vijayanagar Empire.

== See also ==
- Rama Raya
- Bijapur Sultanate
- Vijaynagar Empire
