= Kaliyani =

Village in Tamil Nadu, India

Kaliyani is a small village in Kadambur Panchayat, Tiruvadanai Taluk, Ramanathapuram District in the Indian state of Tamil Nadu.

Kaliyani is served by Karaikudi Junction Railway Station, Devakottai Road Railway Station, Madurai Airport, and Tiruchirappalli International Airport. All are Tamil Language speaking peoples. Most of the locals are working in abroad like Singapore, Malaysia, Dubai etc. for earning.

== Economy ==
Agriculture is the main profession.

== Infrastructure ==
Education, potable water, transport and electrical service are the main concern.

== Culture ==
All are Hindus and Multi Caste peoples are living together. Most of the peoples are Udaiyar caste. Their main worship is Adi Function and their local god is Arulmigu Sree Muthumariamman.

== Activities ==
Young peoples are gathered and doing lot of things to their Village. They are cleaning the Village and Planting the trees etc. https://kaliyaniyans.blogspot.com/ and https://greenvillage-kaliyani.blogspot.com/
