= Siege of Adavani =

1543 siege battle between Rama Raya's forces

- Part of Vijayanagar Civil War (1542-1543)
Date	1543
Location	Adoni, India
Result	Rama Raya victory

Belligerents
Aliya Rama Raya's Faction	Salakamraju Pedda Tirumala's Faction

Commanders and leaders
Sadasiva Raya; Aliya Rama Raya; Tirumala Deva Raya; Venkatadri; Pemmasani Erra Timmanayudu; Ramaraja Tirumala; Akkaya Cina Timma Nayaka	Salakamraju Tirumala; Sanjar khan

The siege of Adavani was a siege battle between Rama Raya's forces, led by Cina Timma Nayaka, and Salakamraju Tirumala's army under the command of Sanjar Khan. Cina Timma Nayaka launched an assault on the Adoni fort, overcoming its defenses After intense fighting, the Adoni fort was captured, and Sanjar Khan was defeated.

== Background ==
Salakaya attempted to halt Rama Raya's advancing army toward Kurnool by assembling his troops and offering battle at Bedagallu. Despite fighting bravely, Salakaya was defeated and retreated to Vijayanagara. With no further resistance, Rama Raya successfully reached Kurnool Rama Raya Following his victories in the region advanced to Adoni a key stronghold and strategic location under Salakamraju Tirumala's control.

== Siege ==
Adoni stood as the last major stronghold in the region still held by Salakamraju Tirumala, serving as a crucial base for his resistance. To secure its defense, he entrusted the fort to an enterprising and skilled Muslim officer named Sanjar Khan, who prepared to repel any assault. However, the fort soon came under siege by Cina Timma Nayaka, a trusted commander in Rama Raya’s forces. Timma Nayaka led a relentless attack, overcoming the fort's defenses with strategic precision. Sanjar Khan and his soldiers were scattered during the fierce engagement, and the fort ultimately fell to the besiegers. The capture of Adoni marked a decisive blow to Salakamraju Tirumala's hold on the region and solidified Rama Raya's dominance.

== Aftermath ==
After capturing the fortress of Adoni Rama Raya established it as his temporary capital, where he is said to have stayed for four months. During this time, he focused on consolidating his position by gathering troops from nearby regions such as Gadwal, Kurnool, and other locations. To fortify his hold, he undertook significant construction projects, including the building of a palace within the fort. Additionally, he strengthened the fortifications by erecting several towers at key points to enhance its defense. Rama Raya is also believed to have laid the foundations of Sukravarapupeta, a new suburb.

== See also ==
- Pemmasani Erra Timmanayudu
- Battle of Toppur
- Venkata II
