= Pemmasani Erra Timmanayudu =

Pemmasani Erra Timmanayudu, also known as Pedda Timmanayudu or Yara Timmanayudu, was a member of the Pemmasani Nayaks in the 16th century Vijayanagara Empire in South India. He is credited for the rise of Rama Raya to the throne of Vijayanagara, and he was the commandant of the Gandikota Fort. His brother was the notable Commander Pemmasani Ramalinga Nayudu.

== Biography ==
Erra Timmanayudu was born to Timmanayudu II and Machamma. According to kaifiyat of Tadipatri, he succeeded to the estates of his father during the reign of Achyutadevaraya. Like his father, Erra became the commandant of the Gandikota Fort, which at that time was an amaram of the Nandyala chiefs. Given the resources at his disposal as the Gandikota commandant, Erra was in a strong position to influence the affairs of Vijayanagara. Erra seems to have started his career during the reign of Achyutadevaraya, and he played a very active role in Vijayanagara politics following the death of Achyutadevaraya, especially in helping Rama Raya rise to power.

Erra espoused the cause of Rama Raya when the latter was "helpless" and in need of assistance. He helped Rama Raya with recruiting soldiers at Gandikota, and Rama Raya began his offensive against Salakaraju from Gandikota with the active assistance of Erra. Erra and his brothers, Chinna Timmanayudu I and Ramalinga Nayudu II, won many battles for Rama Raya, including the Battle of Juturu and Battle of Betamcherla. A historian, Y. Sriramamurthy, stated the following about the role played by Erra in assisting Rama Raya:

But for the assistance given by Yara [Erra] Timmanayudu, Ramaraya might not have succeeded in destroying Salakaraju Tirumala and enthroning his own nominee Sadasiva Raya. Indirectly, Yara [Erra] Timmanayudu contributed his [might] in laying the foundations for the meteoric rise of Ramaraya in particular and of the Araviti family in general.

Erra constructed a village and named it Timmanayudupeta. Since in the Vijayanagara Empire, the governors, commandants of forts, and amarnayakas could mint their own coins, Erra Timmanayudu did just that and circulated them in his fiefdom. He also made improvements to the Chintala Venkataramana Temple, which was built by his father, and added paintings using the large amount of money and jewels that he received from Rama Raya as gifts.

Sriramamurthy states that "most probably", Erra Timmanayudu may have died in the Battle of Talikota because the Kaifiyat of Tadipatri makes no mention of him after the battle. Erra Timmanayudu was succeeded by his son, Pemmasani Narasimhanayudu.

== Bibliography ==
- Murthy, N. S. Ramachandra (1996), Forts of Āndhra Pradesh: From the Earliest Times Upto 16th C. A.D, Bharatiya Kala Prakashan, ISBN 9788186050033
- Sriramamurty, Y. (1964), "History of the Pemmasani Family", Journal of the Andhra Historical Society, Volume 30, Parts 1-4, Andhra Historical Research Society, pp. 89–104
  - Sriramamurty, Y. (1973), "The Pemmasani Family" (PDF), Studies in the History of the Telugu country during the Vijayanagara period 1336 to 1650 A D, Karnatak University/Shodhganga, hdl:10603/107988
- Ramaswami, N. S. (1975), Temples of Tadpatri, Govt. of Andhra Pradesh
