= Sadasiva Raya =

Emperor of Vijayanagara from 1542 to 1570

- Rajadhiraja

Emperor of Vijayanagara
- Reign: c. 1542–1570
- Predecessor: Venkata I
- Successor: Tirumala Deva Raya
- Regent: Rama Raya
- Born: 1526; Vijayanagara, Vijayanagara Empire (modern day Hampi, Karnataka, India)
- Died: 1570 (aged 43–44)
- Dynasty: Tuluva
- Religion: Hinduism

Sadasiva Raya (reigned 1542–1570) was the last Emperor of Vijayanagara from the Tuluva dynasty, and reigned from 1542 until his death in 1570. During most of his reign, Rama Raya was the de facto ruler of the state, and created strategic alliances with the Deccan sultanates, who later formed an alliance against Vijayanagara and decisively defeated Rama Raya at the Battle of Talikota in 1565. After the defeat, the capital Vijayanagara, was burned down and Sadasiva Raya retreated to Penukonda, the new capital of the empire, where he died in 1570.

== Reign ==
When the Vijayanagara Emperor Achyuta Raya died in 1542, his son, Venkata I succeeded him. However, Venkata I was assassinated six months later. Sadasiva Raya, who was the nephew (sister-in-law's son) of Achyuta Raya, became the new Emperor in accordance with the Aliya succession laws prevalent among the Tuluvas. Sadasiva Raya, along with his Prime Minister Rama Raya, restored the Vijayanagara empire's power, which had diminished after the reign of Krishna Deva Raya. The strategy was to play the Turko-Persian Sultanates in the Deccan against each other by first allying with one and then the other.

Preceded by Achyuta Deva Raya	Vijayanagar empire 1542–1569	Succeeded by Rama Raya
