= Rama Raya =

Regent of Vijayanagara from 1542 to 1565

- Raja; Aliya; Sultan of the World

Regent of Vijayanagara
- Regent: 1542 – 23 January 1565
- Successor: Tirumala Deva Raya
- Born: Rama Raya; 1484
- Died: 23 January 1565 (aged 80–81); Talikota
- Spouse: Tirumalamba
- House: Aravidu
- Religion: Hinduism
- Occupation: General, regent, statesman

Rama Raya (1484 – 23 January 1565) was a statesman of the Vijayanagara Empire, the son-in-law of Emperor Krishna Deva Raya and the progenitor of the Aravidu dynasty of Vijayanagara Empire, the fourth and last dynasty of the empire. As a regent, he was the de facto ruler of the empire from 1542 to 1565, although legally the emperor during this period was Sadasiva Raya, who was merely a puppet ruler. Rama Raya was killed at the Battle of Talikota, after which the Vijayanagara Empire was fragmented into several semi-independent principalities paying only nominal allegiance to the empire.

== Early life and career ==
Rama Raya was born into a Telugu family. His mother, Abbaladevi, was the daughter of a chieftain in Nandyala. The Aravidu family, to which Rama Raya belonged, was native to South Andhra. Rama Raya and his younger brother, Tirumala Deva Raya, were sons-in-law of the great Vijayanagara emperor Krishna Deva Raya. In Kannada tradition, he is referred to as Aliya Rama Raya, where "Aliya" means "son-in-law" in the Kannada language.

Along with another brother, Venkatadri, the Aravidu brothers rose to prominence during Krishna Deva Raya's rule. Rama Raya distinguished himself as a successful army general, an able administrator, and a tactful diplomat, conducting many victorious campaigns under the emperor's leadership.

After Krishna Deva Raya's demise in 1529, his younger brother, Achyuta Deva Raya, ascended the throne. Rama Raya's influence grew significantly during this period, aided by his alliance with Pemmasani Erra Timmanayudu of the Pemmasani Nayaks. Following Achyuta Deva Raya's death in 1542, the throne passed to his nephew, Sadasiva Raya, who was then a minor. Rama Raya became the regent and effectively controlled the administration.

Although Sadasiva Raya eventually came of age, Rama Raya retained power by keeping him a virtual prisoner. During this time, Rama Raya became the de facto ruler of the Vijayanagara Empire. To consolidate his authority, he replaced many of the kingdom's loyal servants with officers loyal to him.

Rama Raya lacked royal lineage, and to legitimize his rule, he claimed a vicarious connection with two powerful medieval Indian empires—the Western Chalukya Empire and Despite his achievements, his tenure as regent left a mixed legacy for the Vijayanagara Empire.

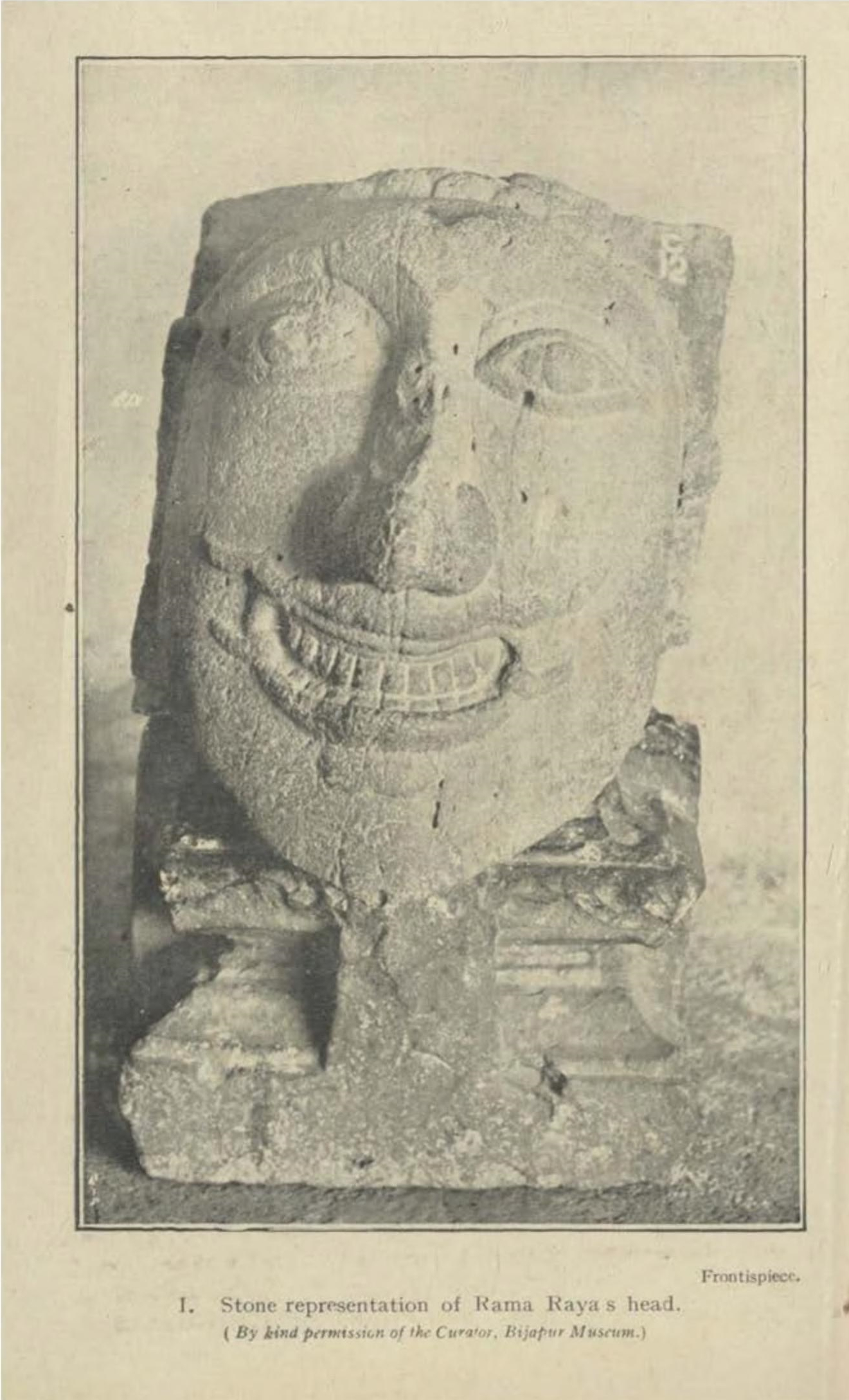
Stone representation of Rama Raya's head

== Sultanate affairs ==
During his rule, the Deccan Sultanates were constantly involved in internal fights and requested Rama Raya on more than one occasion to act as a mediator, enabling Rama Raya to push north of the Krishna river and expand his domains utilizing the disunity of the Deccan Sultans. Rama Raya had a lot of money at his disposal, which he generously spent, and often sought strategic alliances with the Deccan sultans, who he had intentionally kept divided. He also suppressed revolts of the chieftains of Travancore and Chandragiri. Some scholars have criticised Rama Raya for interfering in the affairs of the Sultans too much, but scholars like Dr. P. B. Desai have defended his political affairs, saying that Rama Raya did whatever he could to increase the prestige and importance of the Vijayanagara empire, ensuring no single Sultanate would rise above the others in power, hence preventing a difficult situation for Vijayanagara. Rama Raya interfered in many Sultanate affairs upon the insistence of one Sultan or the other, just the way the Sultans had acted as parleys between Rama Raya and Achyuta Raya in earlier years. When the Nizam of Ahmednagar and Qutbshah of Golconda sought Rama Raya's help against Bijapur, Rama Raya secured the Raichur doab for his benefactors. Later in 1549 when the Adilshah of Bijapur and Baridshah of Bidar declared war on Nizamshah of Ahmednagar, Ramaraya fought on behalf of the Ahmednagar ruler and secured the fort of Kalyana. In 1557 Ramaraya allied himself with Ali Adilshah of Bijapur and Baridshah of Bidar when the Sultan of Bijapur invaded Ahmednagar. The combined armies of the three kingdoms defeated the partnership between Nizamshah of Ahmednagar and the Qutbshah of Golconda.

The Vijayanagar ruler's constantly changing sides to improve his own position eventually prompted the Sultanates to form an alliance. Intermarriage among Sultanate families helped resolve internal differences of the Muslim rulers. The Battle of Talikota resulted from this consolidation of Muslim power in the northern Deccan, who had felt insulted by Ramaraya and formed a 'general league of the faithful.'

== Battle of Talikota ==
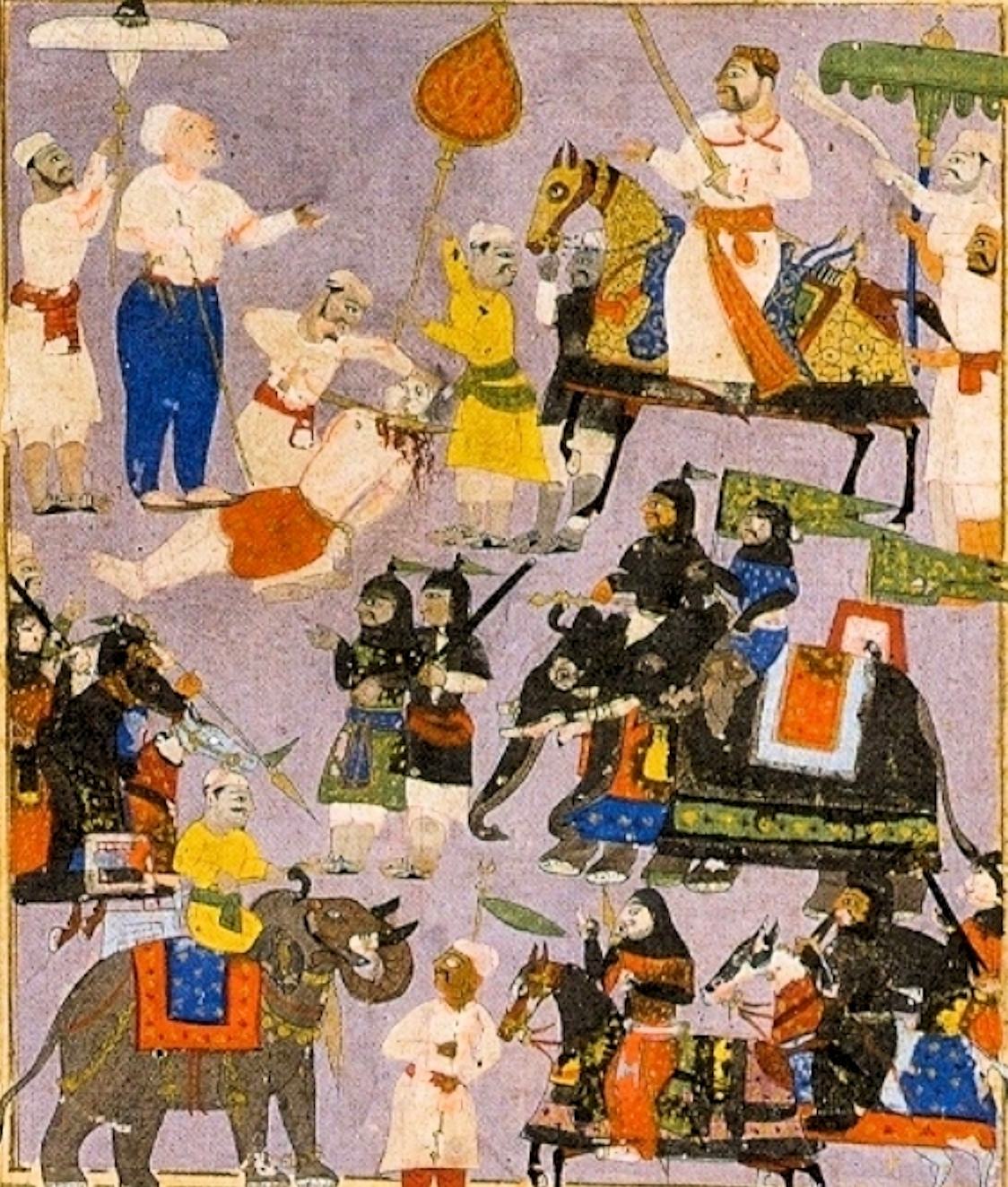
Husain Shah (riding a horse) orders the decapitation of Ramaraya (reigned 1542-65), the defeated ruler of Vijayanagara, in the Battle of Talikota. Ta'rif-i Husain Shahi (Chronicle of Husain Shah), 16th century.

Rama Raya remained loyal to the legitimate dynasty until it was finally extinguished by war, with the notable exception of imprisoning the appointed ruler Sadasiva Raya and ruling in his stead. In 1565, it was Rama Raya, as the pre-eminent general of the Vijayanagar army, who led the defense against the invading army of Deccan Sultans (i.e. Husain Nizam Shah, Ali Adil Shah and Ibrahim Qutb Shah) in the battle of Talikota.

Rama Raya was eventually beheaded either by Sultan Nizam Hussain himself or by someone else acting on his behest despite Adil Shah, who had friendly relations with Raya, intending against. The city of Vijayanagara was sacked by the invaders and the inhabitants were massacred. The imperial family was largely exterminated.

| Preceded by Achyuta Raya | Vijayanagar empire 1542–1565 | Succeeded by Tirumala Deva Raya |
