= Bahmani Tombs =

Necropolis in Bidar, India

Bahmani tombs
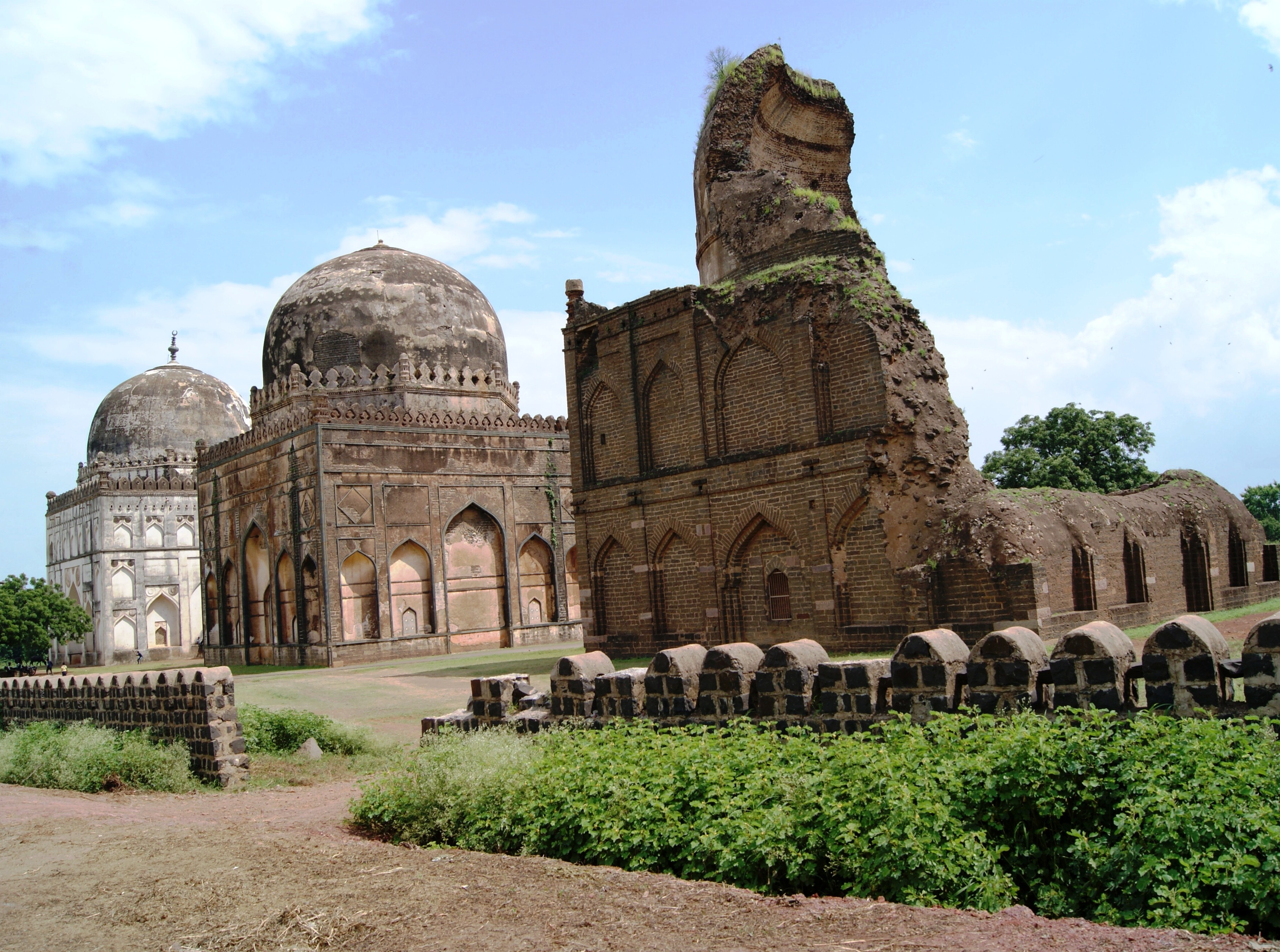
- The Bahmani tombs; The partially collapsed tomb of Humayun Shah is seen in the foreground
- Type: necropolis
- Location: Bidar, Karnataka
- Coordinates: 17.915°N 77.561°E
- Built: 15th and 16th century
- Architectural style(s): Indo-Islamic architecture

The Bahmani tombs complex at Bidar is the necropolis of the Bahmani dynasty, located in Bidar, in the Indian state of Karnataka.

Built during the 15th and 16th centuries, the tombs are an example of a distinct Indo-Islamic style of architecture unique to the Deccan, drawing heavily from Persian architecture, with considerable Hindu influences.

== History ==
The Bahmani Sultanate ruled the Deccan region in South India between the 14th and 16th centuries. The sultans and members of the ruling family were buried in elaborate tombs built in a unique Indo-Islamic style of architecture. The tombs of earlier rulers are found in the Haft Gumbaz complex at Gulbarga, which was the capital of the sultanate.

In 1432, Ahmad Shah I Wali shifted the capital from Gulbarga to Bidar, and consequently, the later sultans are buried here. The tombs were erected from 1436 to 1535, with the tomb of Ahmad Shah being the first.

The tombs of eight Bahmani sultans, as well as some queens and other family members, are located at the complex. The decline in size of the later tombs corresponds with the decline of the political influence of the Bahmanis.

In 1527, the Bahmani Sultanate split into five successor states, known as the Deccan Sultanates. Bidar came under the rule of the Barid Shahi dynasty, who are buried in the Barid Shahi tombs complex.

== Description ==
The architectural style is a regional variant of Indo-Islamic architecture unique to the Deccan, with considerable Persian influences such as the use of encaustic tiles, as well as influences from Hindu temple architecture. The Bahmani rulers generally employed Persian architects who would design the main featured of the buildings, while Hindu masons and craftsmen would supervise the construction and fill in the details.

There are eight tombs of the Bahmani rulers, as well as tombs of other family members. The tombs are square structures surmounted by bulbous domes, built of black trap masonry laid in lime. Some of the tombs had elaborate external tile decoration, in the form of floral motifs, Islamic geometric patterns, and calligraphy. The inscriptions of the tomb reveal the name of the king, his date of accession, and date of death. Persian poetry and Quranic verses are also inscribed.

=== Tomb of Ahmad Shah ===
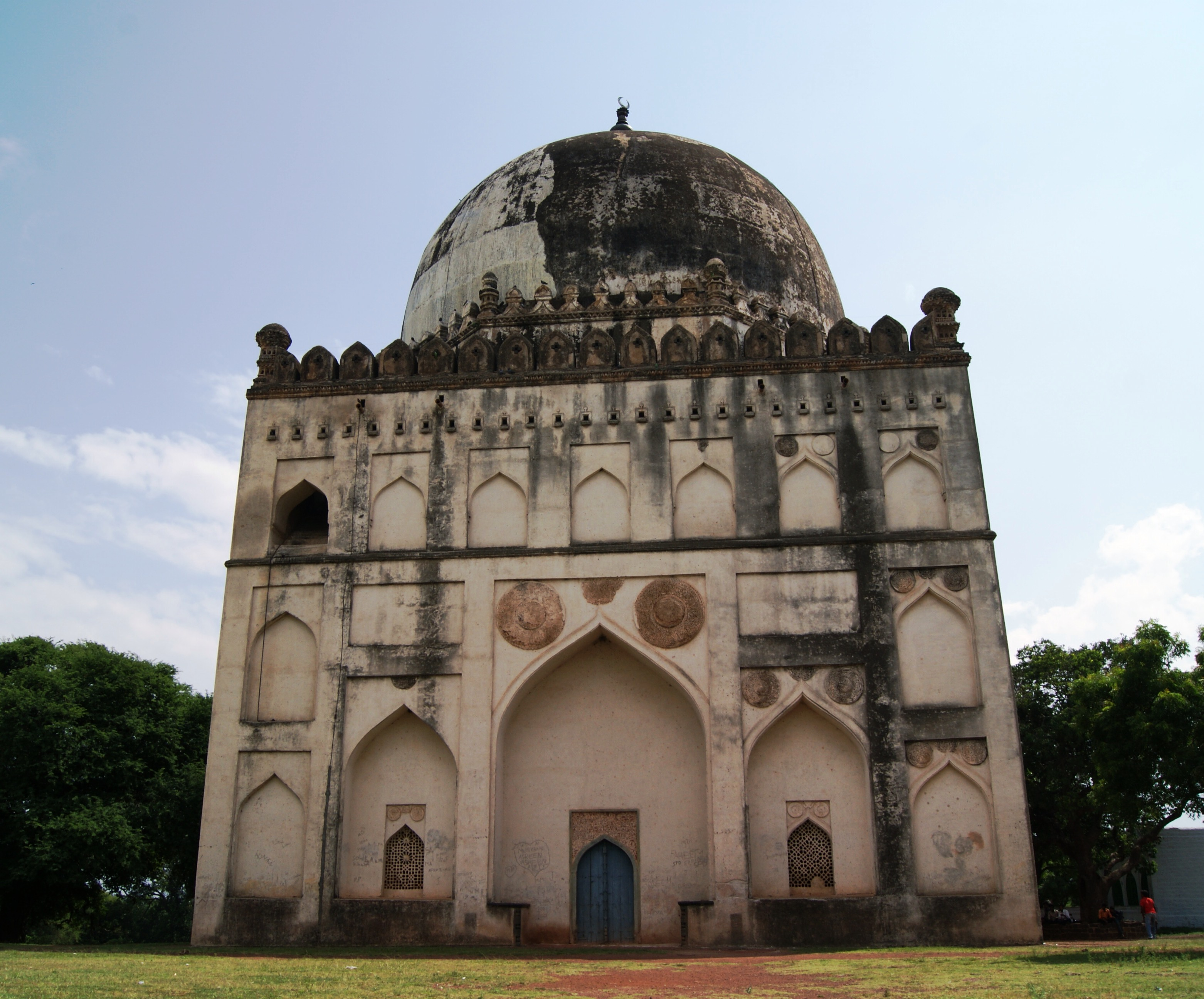
Tomb of Ahmad Shah

Ahmad Shah I Wali was the first sultan to be buried within the complex. His tomb is of a square design with arches on each face, crowned with a bulbous dome, which resembles Lodi domes in terms of design. The exterior is further embellished by a parapet wall of arch-heads above the walls, and ornate turrets at the corners. Several levels of arched niches adorn the exterior.

The interior of the tomb of Ahmad Shah is decorated with frescoes. The panels above the entrance arches contain religious texts in the Kufic script, and verses by Shah Nimatullah Wali in the Thuluth script. The ceiling is decorated with calligraphy of the names of Allah, Muhammad, Ali, and his descendants.

The tomb is venerated as a dargah by Muslims as well as Hindus of the lingayat sect, who take part in the Urs (death anniversary observance) of Ahmad Shah every year.

=== Tombs of Ahmad Shah's wife and son ===
To the east of Ahmad Shah's mausoleum is a tomb assigned to his wife. The tomb is of a similar style as Ahmad Sha's tomb, but smaller in size. There is no inscription within the tomb. There are five graves within the hall, of which the grave at the extreme left is considered that of the queen.

Another tomb to the south is considered to be the mausoleum of his son. Either his son Mahmud Khan or Daud Khan or both, may be buried within as the hall contains eight graves.

=== Tomb of Ala-ud-Din Shah ===
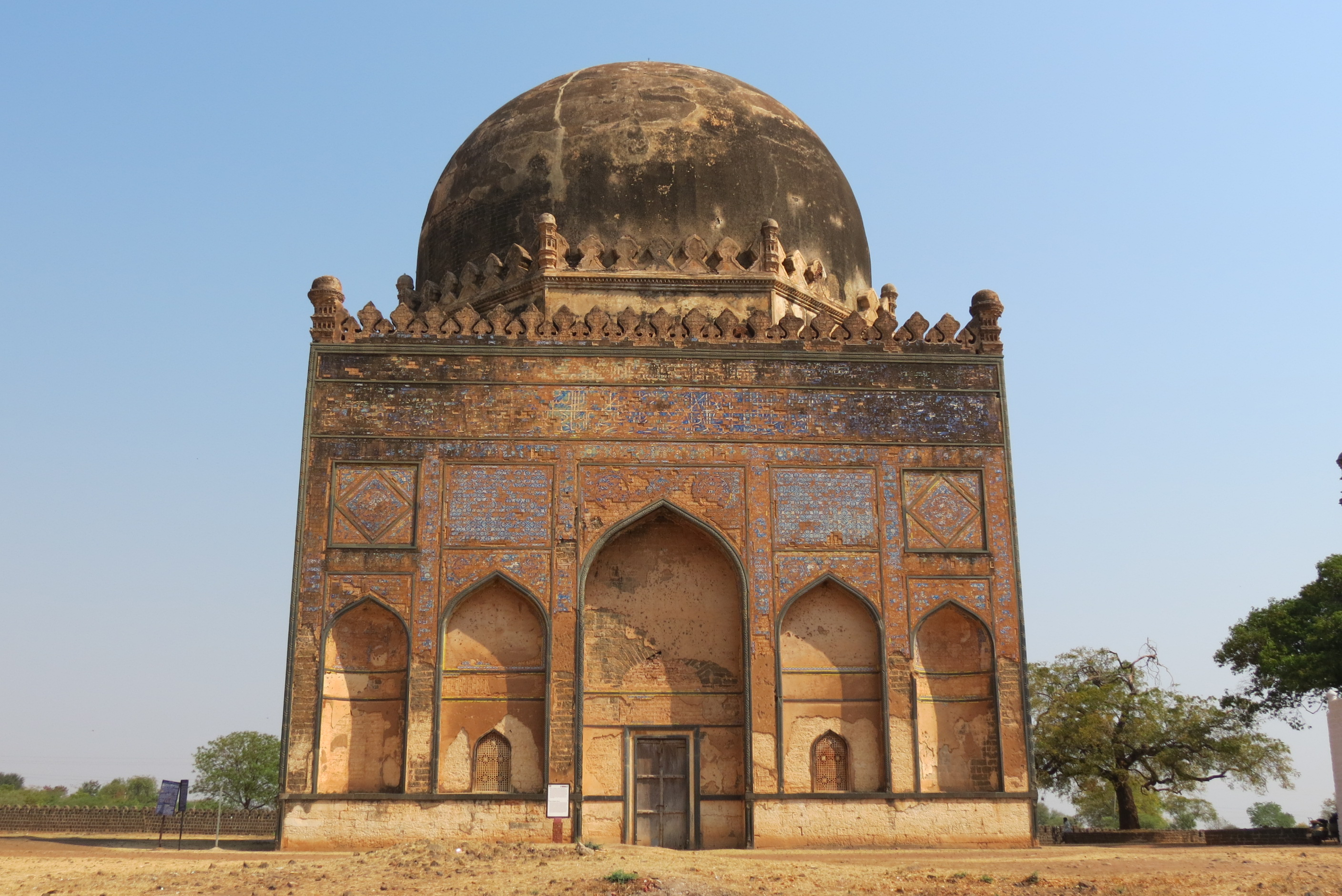
Tomb of Ala-ud-din Shah

Alau-ud-din Shah succeeded his father Ahmad Shah in 1436, and probably built the tomb during his lifetime. The square mausoleum has lofty entrance arches on three sides. Each entrance arch is flanked by a pair of smaller arches on either side. A trefoil-patterned parapet rises above the walls.

The facade of the tomb is covered in enamel tiles, most of which have been lost due to deterioration by the weather and vandalism. The tiles, Persian blue, green, and, yellow in colour, comprise calligraphic designs and floral motifs. The ceiling of the dome was originally painted, however, only a few fragments of paint survive.

=== Tomb of Humayun Shah ===
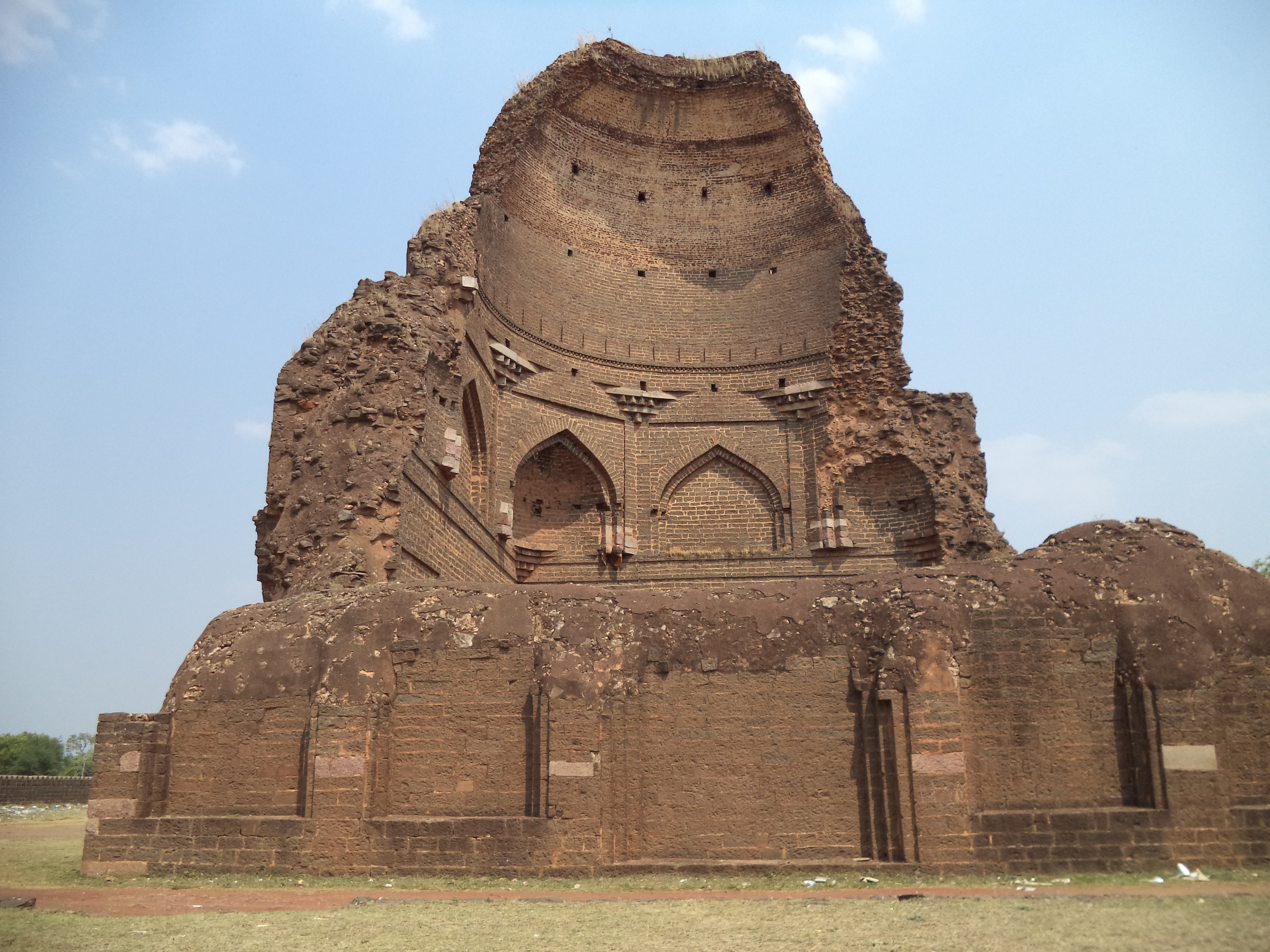
The partially collapsed tomb of Humayun Shah

Humayun Shah succeeded his father Ala-ud-din in 1458, and ruled until 1461. A large part of the tomb of Humayun Shah was destroyed by a lightning strike in the late 19th century. The distinctive features of the tomb include the unique shape of its arches, with a wide span and low imposts, and the trabeate style of niches, which is characteristic of Hindu temples in the Deccan. The upper courses of the dome are made up of light spongy bricks, similar to those used in Kakatiya temples.

=== Tomb of Malika-i-Jahan ===
Malika-i-Jahan (lit. Queen of the world) was the title of Humayun Shah's wife. Her tomb is situated to the south-west of her husband's tomb, and is smaller in dimensions. There are four graves within the vault and the second of these, which is in the middle of the hall is that of the queen.

=== Incomplete tombs of Nizam Shah and Muhammad Shah III ===
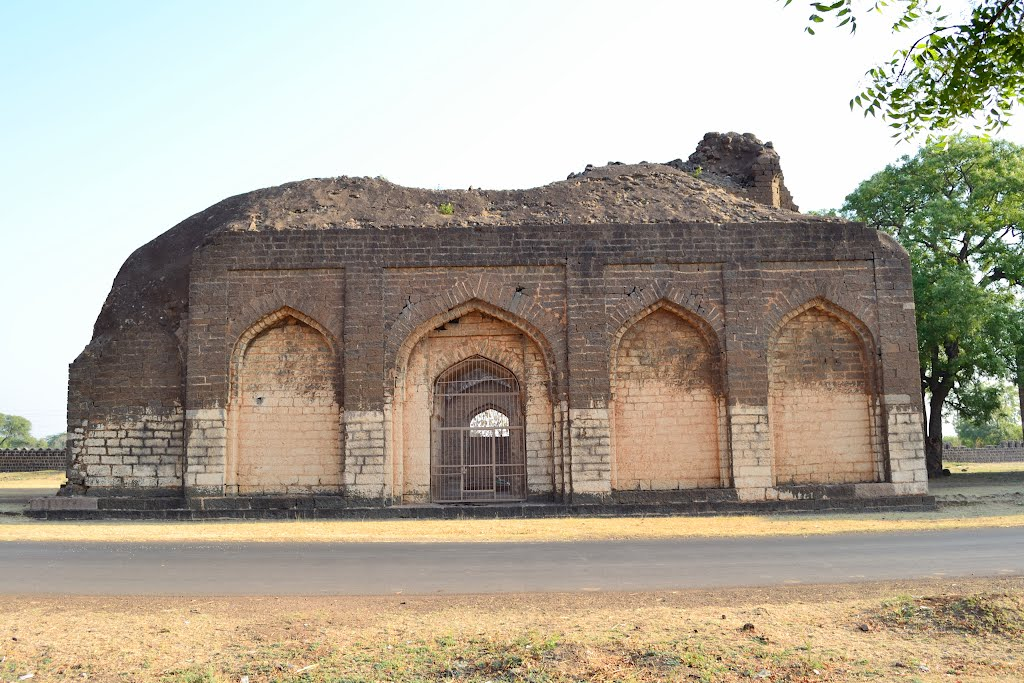
The incomplete tomb of Muhammad Shah III

Nizam Shah ascended the throne at the age of eight, and ruled for two years between 1461 and 1463. His tomb was probably intended to be similar in size to the earlier tombs, given the thickness of the walls. It is thought to have been commissioned by his mother Malika-i-Jahan, and remained unfinished on account of her death. The square hall contains five arches on each face. The entrance is through the southern side, and the interior of the western wall is in the form of a mihrab.

Muhammad Shah III Lashkari succeeded his brother, and ruled for nineteen years until his death in 1482. His tomb is also incomplete, and of a similar design to the tomb of Nizam Shah. There are three graves within the enclosure, the middle one of which is the grave of Muhammad Shah III.

=== Tomb of Mahmud Shah II ===
Mahmud Shah II ruled between 1482 and 1518, and probably constructed the tomb during his lifetime. His tomb is comparable to the earlier tombs in terms of size. However, neither is its exterior adorned with tiles, nor its interior decorated with frescoes. The only embellishment present is the parapet of arch-heads rising on top of the walls. Each face of the square tomb has a lofty arch in the middle, flanked by three-tiered smaller arches.

=== Two anonymous tombs ===
Two sepulchres are situated to the south of Mahmud Shah's tomb. One of them has a conical dome with eight facets. These may be the burial sites of Ahmad Shah II (r. 1518–1520) and Ala-ud-Din II (r. 1520–1522), who were puppet kings under the prime minister Amir Barid.

=== Tombs of Wali-ullah and Kalim-ullah ===
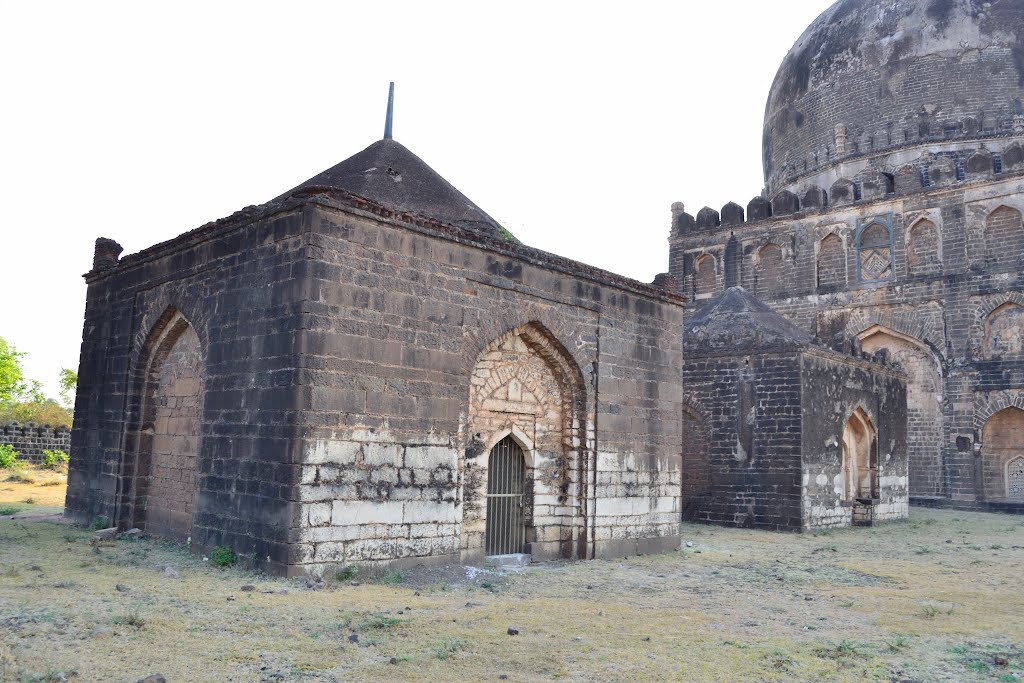
Tombs of Wali-ullah and Kalim-ullah with the tomb of Mahmud Shah in the background

Wali-ullah (r. 1522–1525) and Kalim-ullah (r. 1525–1527) were the last Bahmani rulers, both ruling as puppet monarchs under prime minister Amir Barid. Their tombs are small square structures with conical domes. The tomb of Kalim-ullah is slightly larger, and is crowned with a cylindrical pinnacle.

=== Tomb of Shah Rukh Khan ===
The tomb of Shah Rukh Khan is located to the north of Mahmud Shah's tomb. Historians believe he was a scion of the Bahmani dynasty, as only royal family members are buried here. The Ayat Al-Kursi is inscribed over the eastern doorway. There are two graves within the tomb.

=== Chaukhandi ===
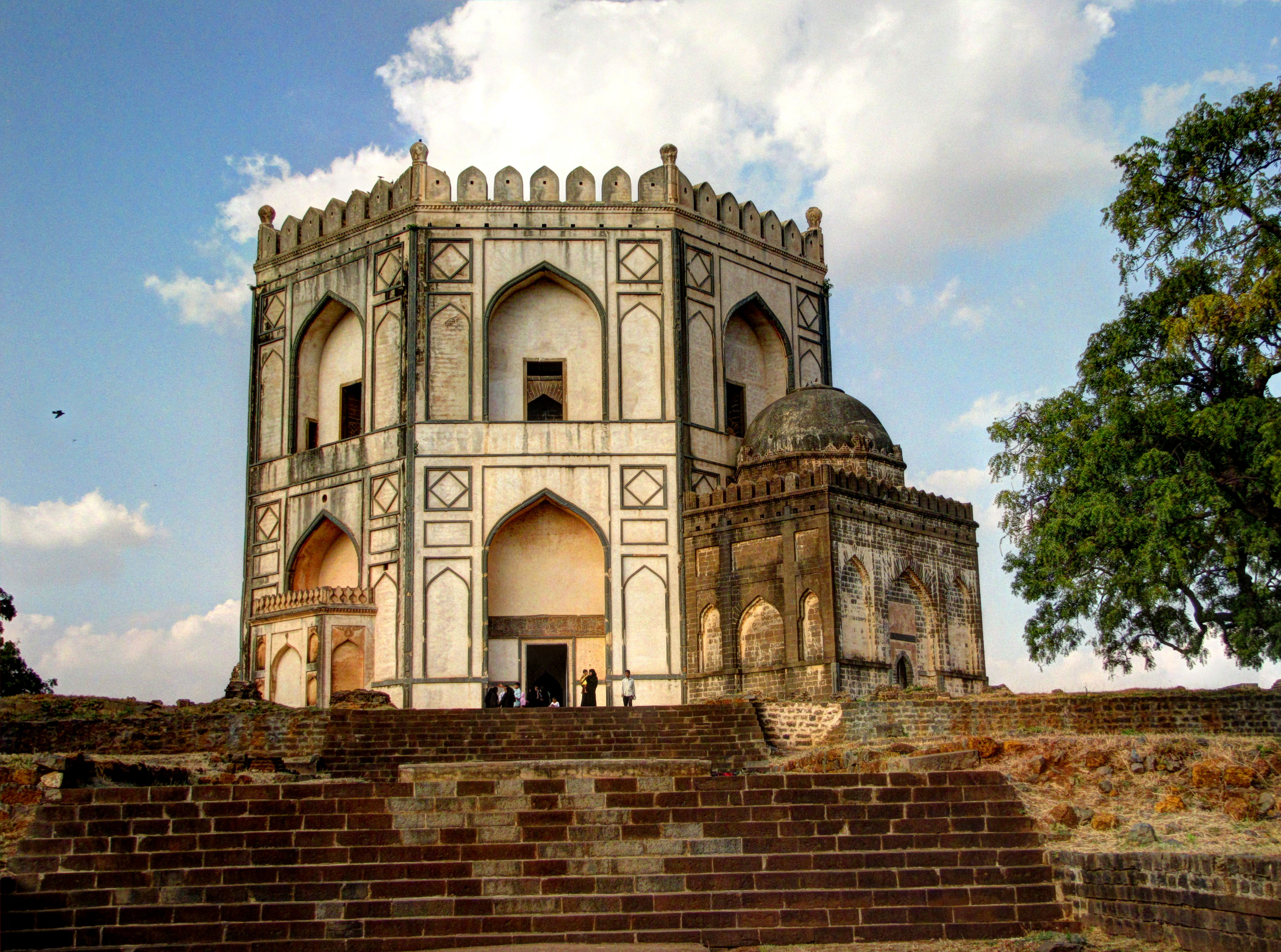
The Chaukhandi

The Chaukhandi (Note: Chaukhandi is a Hindi word meaning a four-storied building. The tomb of Khalil-ullah is two-storied, but is known as the chaukhandi as it is situated on a raised platform, accessible by several flights of steps.(Yazdani 1947, p. 141)) is situated about a kilometer west of the main necropolis. It is the tomb of Khalil-ullah Kirmani, a Sufi saint and spiritual advisor to Ahmad Shah. It is a double-storied octagonal structure, and is similar in style to the tomb of Ala-ud-din. It was decorated with encaustic tiles, of which only a few remain.

In later times, several vaults were built for the graves of Khalil-ullah's descendants, one of which is attached to the Chaukhandi. A small domed sepulchre is situated at the south-western face of the Chaukhandi. It is not known who was buried here.

=== Other tombs and structures ===
To the south-west of Kalim-ullah's tomb is a mosque, which was used to perform funerary prayers before interment. It is a small building with three arched openings. Another, smaller mosque is located between the tombs of Ahmad Shah and Ala-ud-din.

Other structures within the complex include a well, which was constructed much later in 1609, during the Barid Shahi period. The well contains inscriptions in Persian and Marathi.

Towards the south of the Chaukhandi, there are several tombs built on a platform under a Neem tree.

== Preservation ==
By the 20th century, the tombs had fallen into disrepair. The archeological department of Hyderabad State restored the tombs to some extent, and demolished houses which had been illegally constructed among the tombs.

The Archaeological Survey of India has listed the site as a monument of national importance. The complex, along with other sites in Bidar, Gulbarga, Bijapur, and Hyderabad is also listed on the tentative list of the World Heritage Sites.
