= Siege of Ahmednagar =

Siege of Ahmednagar may refer to:

- Siege of Ahmednagar (1543), conflict between Ahmednagar Sultanate and Vijaynagara Empire
- Siege of Ahmednagar (1558–1559), conflict between Ahmadnagar Sultanate and Vijayanagara Empire
- Siege of Ahmednagar (1561–1562), conflict between Ahmadnagar Sultanate and Vijayanagara Empire
- Siege of Ahmednagar (1803), conflict part of Second Anglo-Maratha War
