= Siege of Ahmednagar (1558–1559) =

Military engagement between Ahmadnagar Sultanate and Vijayanagara Empire

- Part of Deccani–Vijayanagar wars
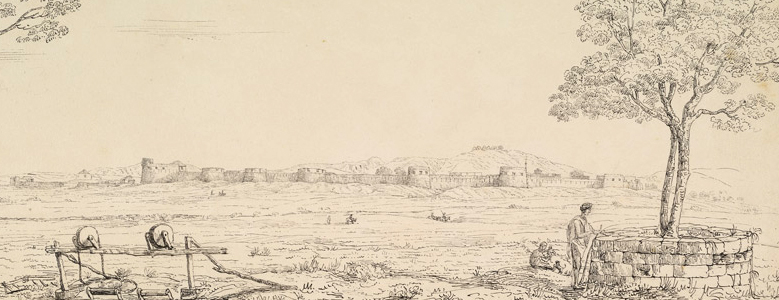
- Ahmednagar Fort
| Date | 1558–1559 A.D |
| Location | Ahmednagar, Maharashtra |
| Result | Peace treaty |
| Territorial changes | Fort of Kalyani ceded to Bijapur Sultanate by Hussain Nizam Shah I |

Belligerents
| Ahmednagar Sultanate; Supported by: Berar Sultanate; Khandesh Sultanate | Vijayanagara Empire; Supported by: Bijapur Sultanate; Qutub Shahi dynasty Bidar Sultanate |

Commanders and leaders
| Hussain Nizam Shah I Qasim Beigand; Sabaji Koli; Molla Inayut Oolla; Darya Imad Shah; Jahangir Khan (executed); Loofall Khan; Mubarak Khan Faroqi II | Rama Raya; Venkatadri; Timmaraja Wodeyar II; Ali Adil Shah I Kishwar Khan; Bin-ul-Mulk; Ibrahim Qutub Shah; Ali Barid Shah I |

Siege of Ahmednagar (1558–1559) was a military engagement between Ahmadnagar Sultanate and Vijayanagara Empire. In the 1558 Vijayanagara along with its allies Bijapur, Bidar and Golconda besieged the fort of Ahmednagar. The siege continued for more than 2 months but the imperialist weren't able to capture the fort. In the end Hussain Nizam Shah I sued for peace because even tho fort wasn't conquered they were struggling for resources. Rama Raya accepted the treaty thus Kalyani was ceded to Bijapur and peace was established.

== Background ==
=== Vijayanagara–Bijapur Alliance ===
Upon the death of Ibrahim Adil Shah, in 1557 CE, his son, Ali Adil Shah I, ascended the throne of Bijapur and brought Bijapur closer to the Vijayanagara Empire. Following the custom of the land, Ali Adil Shah sent envoys to Vijayanagar and Ahmadnagar to announce to their rulers that he had ascended the throne. The ambassadors to Vijayanagara were graciously received by Rama Raya, who sent one of his officers to accompany them back and convey his greetings. But Muhammad Hussain Siddiqui, the envoy to Ahmadnagar, was not extended similar consideration, given Sultan Hussain Nizam Shah I's unmistakable show of hostility.

To consolidate ties with Vijayanagar, Ali visited Rama Raya with 100 horsemen, expressing his condolences for the death of Rama Raya's son. Rama Raya, honored by him, persuaded him to terminate his mourning, and by means of symbolism, the wife of Rama Raya adopted him. Gift exchanges that introduced their alliance lasted for three days before Ali departed. During this period, the Nizam Shahi invasion collapsed when Hussain Nizam pulled back to Ahmadnagar after the withdrawal of his ally, Ibrahim Qutb, to Golconda.

== Siege ==
Therefore, Ali Adil Shah of Bijapur requested Nizam Shah Hussain to return Kalyani and Sholapur. When Hussain sent a very vague and dismissive reply, Ali Adil Shah declared war and appealed to Vijayanagara for support. Rama Raya agreed to help and persuaded Ibrahim Qutb Shah to join the concerted military operations, which the latter did after hesitating for a while to uphold their treaty.

Leading 100,000 cavalry and 50,000 infantry, Rama Raya and his allies invaded Kalyani and ravaged the lands of Nizam Shah. According to Firishta, a great extent of devastation was reported by the Vijayanagara army. Alarmed, Hussain fortified his capital but fled to Paithan and sought help from Berar, Khandesh, and Bidar. Escaping the clutches of the pursuers, he fled chest-deep in the flooded Godavari, and barely escaped.

Rama Raya, during the siege of Ahmadnagar, fought very closely, along with support from his allies, including Adil Shahi ruler Ali, and nearly captured the fort after two months of intense fighting. So secretive were the actions of one of their allies that his name brings about the intrigue. Ibrahim Qutb Shah of Golkonda openly purported to be an ally of the besiege, while he very secretly supported the defenses of Ahmadnagar. He proclaimed openly to be an ally of the besiegers, while he privately urged the besieged to maintain an additional hold on their fort and did allow supplies and artillery into the fort.

Although frustrated immediately, Rama Raya agreed to prolong the siege for induction into the district of Indgi after Ali Adil Shah promised to make him the king of that district. Ibrahim had, therefore, with his own stakes, drag out the artillery and supplies to move away from Indgi, as well as to ply bribery to the Vijayanagar nobles to stop the siege. When these attempts turned fruitless, Ibrahim threatened to withdraw the Golkonda forces from the siege unless it be lifted. However, reinforcement by Berar under Jehangir Khan struck communications leading to acute famine in the besieging camp. It became apparent to Rama Raya that he could not prolong the hope very long and that he would finally have to flee Ashti.

At Ashti, the allies meant to regroup for a renewed campaign, but negotiations with Hussain Nizam Shah of Ahmadnagar had led to the peace settlement-in which, in exchange, Ahmadnagar ceded the fort of Kalyani to Ali Adil Shah, executed Jehangir Khan for what he had done against the allies, and also agreed that, as a show of submission, Hussain Nizam Shah would visit Rama Raya and formally receive pan from him.

== Aftermath ==
=== Humiliation of Hussain Nizam Shah I ===
Having gained the victory, Hussain ordered the assassination of Jehangir Khan, who had been his supporter earlier. He next went into the camp of Rama Raya to receive betel and, however, insulted him by washing his hands after having shaken hands. Offended, Rama Raya declared that he would have punished Hussain if he were not his guest. Tensions were on the verge of being wrought into conflict.

Hussain gave Kalyani's keys to Rama Raya as a "gift," and Rama Raya immediately handed them to Ali Adil Shah. After having finished with the formalities, Hussain left without meeting with Ali Adil. The treaty was concluded, and the representatives went back to their respective capitals.

== See also ==
- Vijayanagara Empire
- Ahmednagar Sultanate
- Bijapur Sultanate
