= Siege of Ahmednagar (1561–1562) =

16th century conflict in Deccan

- Part of Deccani–Vijayanagar wars
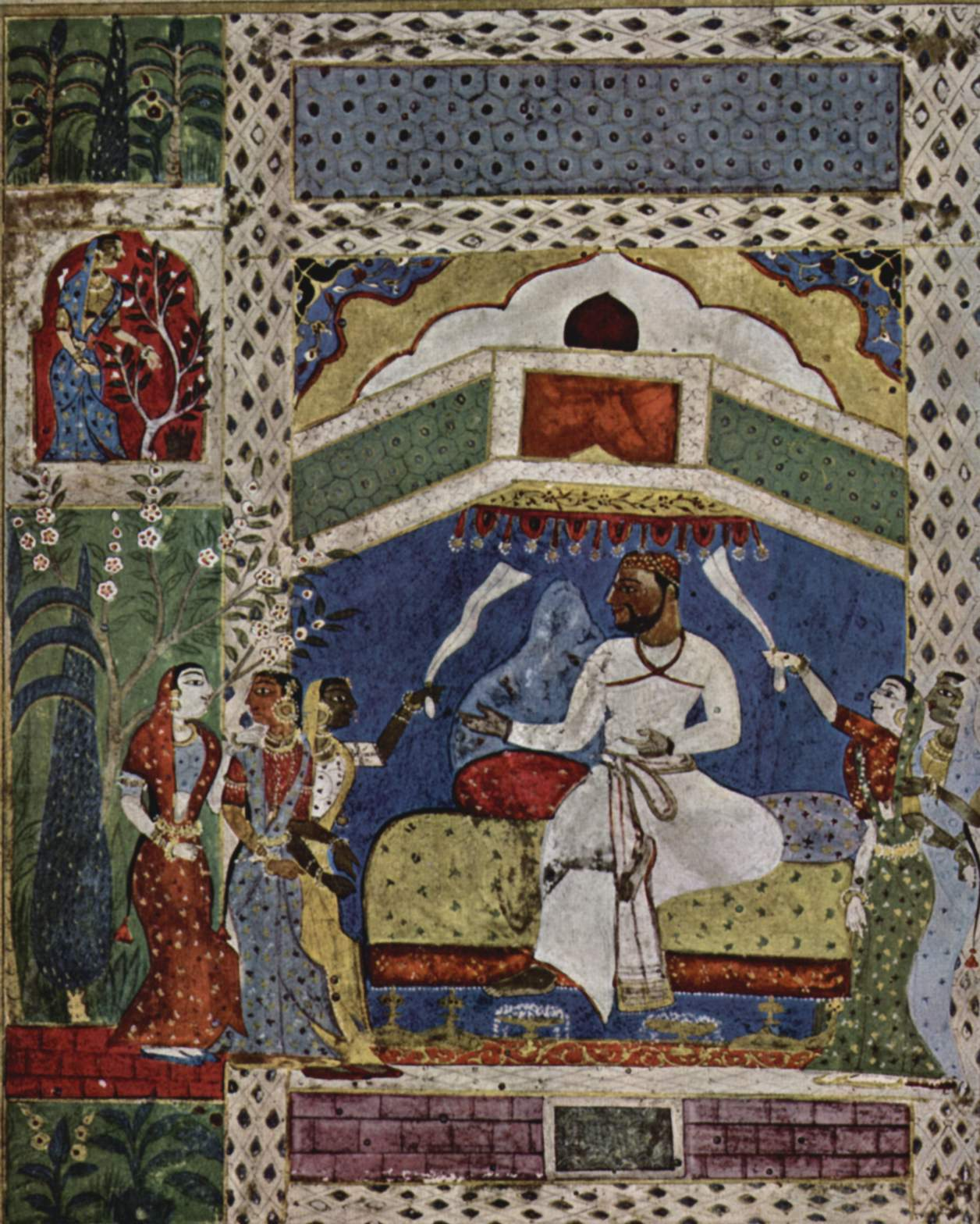
- Hussain Nizam Shah I of Ahmednagar Sultanate
Date	1561–1562 A.D
Location	Ahmednagar, Maharashtra
Result	Ahmednagar victory
Territorial changes	The allied forces failed to capture Ahmednagar Fort

Belligerents
Ahmednagar Sultanate; Supported by Qutub Shahi dynasty Berar Sultanate	Vijayanagara Empire; Supported by Bijapur Sultanate; Berar Sultanate; Bidar Sultanate

Commanders and leaders
Hussain Nizam Shah I Murtaza Nizam Shah I Sabaji Koli †; Hussain Rustam †; Ibrahim Qutub Shah; Darya Imad Shah	Rama Raya; Venkatadri; Ali Adil Shah I Alamshah †; Burhan Imad Shah; Ali Barid Shah I

Siege of Ahmednagar (1561–1562) was a military engagement between the Ahmadnagar Sultanate and Vijayanagara Empire. In the 1561 the allied forces of Vijayanagara, Bijapur, Berar and Bidar attacked Ahmednagar and Golconda and forced them to raise the Siege of Kalayani and retreat towards Ahmednagar. The imperialist besieged the fort for a year but finding no success the siege was raised in 1562 and the besiegers retreated to their capital.

== Prelude ==
In 1562, tensions flared up again after the peace established in 1559. Hussain Nizam Shah, grateful for Sultan Ibrahim Qutb Shah of Golconda's support during the Ahmadnagar siege, sent Moulana Inayatullah as an envoy to express his thanks and discuss a potential marriage alliance. Ibrahim Qutb Shah agreed to the proposal, which led to a meeting between the two rulers near Kalyani the following year. At this gathering, Hussain Nizam Shah's daughter, Bibi Jamal, was wed to Ibrahim Qutb Shah. After a month of festivities, the two kings jointly laid siege to Kalyani. In response, Ali Adil Shah once again reached out to Vijayanagar's ruler, Rama Raya, for help, sending envoys Kishwar Khan and Abu Turab. At the same time, Ali Barid Shah was invited to join the emerging alliance.

== Siege ==
Rama Raya first sent his brother, Venkatadri, along with Jagadeva Rao and Bin-ool-Mulk, leading a force of 15,000 cavalry and 30,000 infantry to invade the southern regions of the Qutb Shahi Sultanate. After they joined the Adil Shahi army on the banks of the Krishna River, he moved forward with the main Vijayanagar army, which included 50,000 cavalry and a significant number of infantry, toward Kalyani. Shortly after, the forces of Ali Barid and Burhan Imad Shah also allied with him and his troops. When Qutb Shah and Hussain learned of Venkatadri’s advances and Rama Raya’s approach, they consulted each other and, deciding to abandon the siege of Kalyani, retreated to their respective capitals.

As Qutub Shah's march aligned with the path of the allied forces, Hussain sent his son, Prince Murtaza Nizam Shah I, along with 3,000 cavalry to support him. However, Ibrahim was still pursued by the Adil Shahi troops. In the battle that followed, several of Qutub Shah's officers were captured, but he managed to reach his capital with great difficulty. Meanwhile, Hussain retreated towards Ahmadnagar with only 1,000 cavalry. Realizing that further pursuit was not needed, the allied forces decided to stop their chase and moved forward in stages. As they got closer, Hussain moved his family to Owsa and, after stocking up his capital with supplies, withdrew to the fortress of Junnar.

The allied forces once again laid siege to Ahmadnagar, sending out detachments to ravage the surrounding countryside.{During this campaign, troops from Vijayanagar were reported to have committed numerous acts of desecration and violence, such as stabling their horses in mosques, performing religious rituals inside them, and mistreating the local population. These actions deeply angered Ali Adil Shah, who, despite his disapproval, found himself unable to stop them. He suggested to Rama Raya that they lift the siege and instead pursue Hussain Nizam Shah to Junnar. In response, Hussain retreated to the nearby mountains and sent commanders Hussain Rushun Khan Deccani, Adham Khan, Hubshi, and Sabaji Koli to encircle the allied forces and cut off their supplies. Their strategies proved effective, significantly hindering the allies’ progress.

A battle broke out at the village of Connor between a detachment of the Bijapur army and the combined forces of the Nizam Shahi troops and Hussain Rustum. Although the latter initially had the advantage, Hussain Rustum ultimately lost his life on the battlefield along with 3,000 of his men. As the rainy season drew near, the allied forces renewed their siege of Ahmadnagar. Rama Raya's army set up camp to the south of the fort, alongside the Sena River. However, heavy rains in the nearby hills caused the river to rise dramatically overnight. This sudden flood resulted in the loss of 300 horses and a significant number of transport cattle, while at least 20 high-ranking officers and over 25,000 soldiers and personnel were swept away. In the wake of this calamity, Rama Raya decided to lift the siege and ordered a retreat. Following suit, Ali Adil Shah also pulled back and headed south.

== Aftermath ==
As Rama Raya passed through Sholapur, he expressed a wish to take control of the city. However, his ally, Ali Adil Shah, was concerned that Rama Raya might claim it for himself and extend his power over the surrounding areas. As a result, they decided to abandon the plan when they were just a few miles from the fort.

The forces then moved on to Hutgi, where they set up camp for six months. During this time, they launched raids into parts of Telangana, creating unrest throughout the Golconda Sultanate. The nearby Bijapur region also faced incursions from Vijayanagar, as Rama Raya, under the pretense of foraging, reportedly looted several districts belonging to his ally. Eventually, Rama Raya agreed to pull back south after Ali Adil Shah offered Yadagiri and Bagalkot in exchange for Vijayanagar's support in the recent conflict.

Upon arriving at Naldurg, the allied forces built extensive stone fortifications. After parting ways with Ali Adil Shah, Rama Raya returned to Vijayanagar. Meanwhile, Ali Adil Shah continued his campaign against the Nizam Shah. Clashes between their forces continued until Hussain Nizam Shah successfully resupplied Sholapur, thwarting its capture through starvation.

== See also ==
- Rama Raya
- Battle of Tallikota
- Ahmednagar Sultanate
