= Qasim Barid I =

Sultan of Bidar from 1489 to 1504

1st Sultan of Bidar
- Reign: 1489–1504
- Predecessor: Position established
- Successor: Amir Barid I
- Died: 1504
- Burial: Barid Shahi tombs, Bidar

Qasim Barid I (r. 1489–1504) was prime-minister of the Bahmani Sultanate and the founder of the Bidar Sultanate, one of the five late medieval Indian kingdoms together known as the Deccan sultanates.

== Biography ==
Qasim Barid was a Sunni Turk domiciled in Safavid Georgia. He entered the service of the Bahmani sultan Muhammad Shah III and later became the prime-minister of the Bahmani sultanate.

=== As Vizier ===
Qasim Barid I led one of the first revolts against the Bahmani Sultanate. He was able to get himself made vizier (chief of state) but had seriously undermined the stability of the kingdom. The Bahmani governors of Junnar, Bijapur and Berar refused to acknowledge the authority of Qasim Barid and declared independence. On 28 May 1490, Malik Ahmad Nizam-ul-Mulk, the governor of Junnar, founded the independent Ahmednagar Sultanate, followed by the foundation of the independent Bijapur Sultanate by Yusuf Adil Khan and the Berar Sultanate by Fathullah Imad-ul-Mulk in the same year. The founding of the dynasty occurred in 1492.

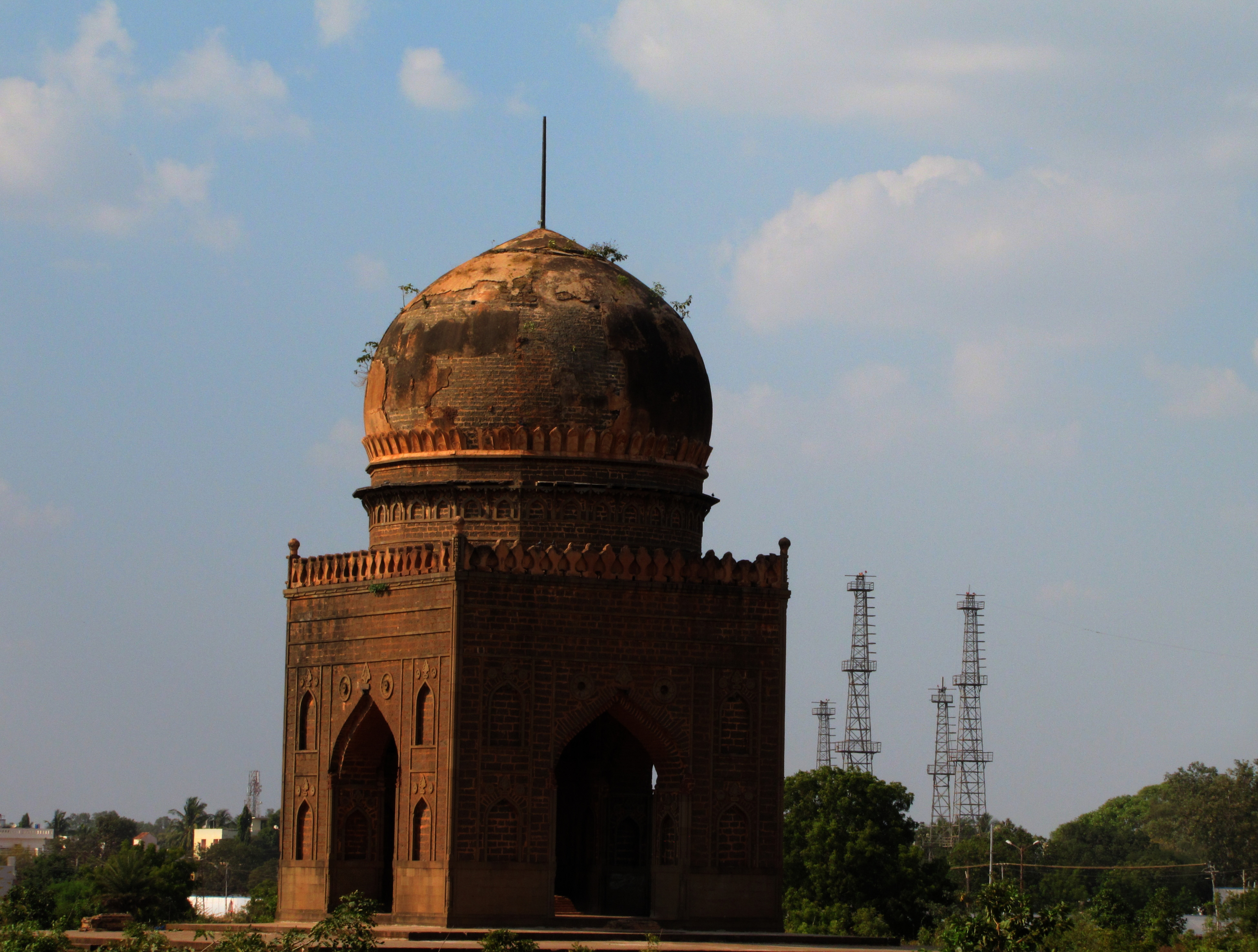
Tomb of Qasim Barid Shah of Bidar Sultanate.

Qasim Barid died in 1504 and was succeeded by his son Amir Barid I, as the prime minister of the Bahmani Sultanate who also became the de facto ruler like his father.
