= Amir Barid I =

Sultan of Bidar from 1504 to 1542

2nd Sultan of Bidar
- Reign: 1504–1542
- Predecessor: Qasim Barid I
- Successor: Ali Barid I
- Died: 1542; Daulatabad
- Burial: Barid Shahi tombs, Bidar
- House: Barid Shahi dynasty

Amir Barid I (reigned 1504–1542), also known as Amir Ali Barid, was the second ruling member of the Barid Shahi dynasty.

He initially ruled with members of the Bahmani dynasty on the throne; however, after the last Bahmani Sultan fled from Bidar, he was practically independent. However, he never assumed any royal titles, and ruled under the title of prime minister.

== Reign ==
He succeeded his father Qasim Barid I in 1504.

He proclaimed Alauddin Shah Bahmani II the king, who reigned from 1520 and 1523. Alauddin planned to assassinate Amir Barid on one of their monthly visits. However, when Amir Barid arrived, one of the assassins in the inner quarters of the house sneezed, alarming him and giving away the conspiracy. Alauddin was imprisoned and put to death in 1523.

He then proclaimed Wali-ullah the king, who had the nominal reign of three years. When Wali-ullah was also caught in a conspiracy against the Prime Minister, the latter put him to death. Amir Barid married his widow and proclaimed his brother Kalim-ullah the new Sultan. Kalim-ullah fled to Bijapur in 1527, and later to Ahmednagar, but was not welcomed by either of the Sultanates, and spent the rest of his life as a prisoner. (Note: The exact year of Kalim-ullah's death is not known, although coins struck in his name bearing the date 1545 CE have been found, suggesting he outlived Amir Barid. These coins were issued by Ali Barid Shah I.)

Amir Barid did not elect another puppet monarch, and continued to rule until 1542. However, he never assumed royal titles.

== Death and burial ==
He died in 1542 before his tomb could be completed, and is therefore buried in an unfinished tomb among the Barid Shahi tombs in Bidar. He was succeeded by his son Ali Barid Shah I.
