= Barid Shahi tombs =

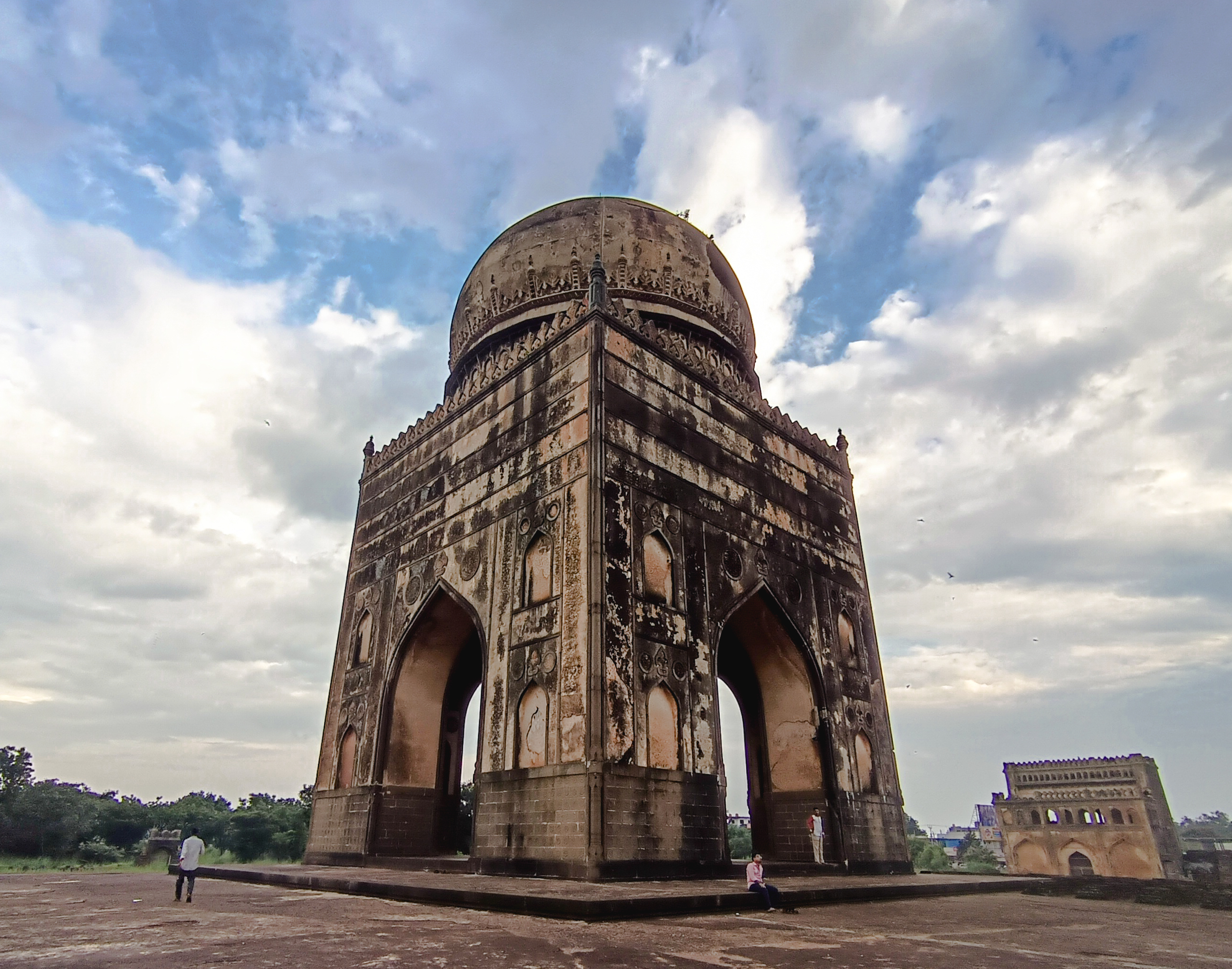
- Tomb of Ali Barid Shah
- Interactive map of Barid Shahi tombs
- Location: Bidar, Karnataka, India
- Coordinates: 17.919°N 77.504°E
- Built: 16th century
- Architectural style: Indo-Islamic architecture

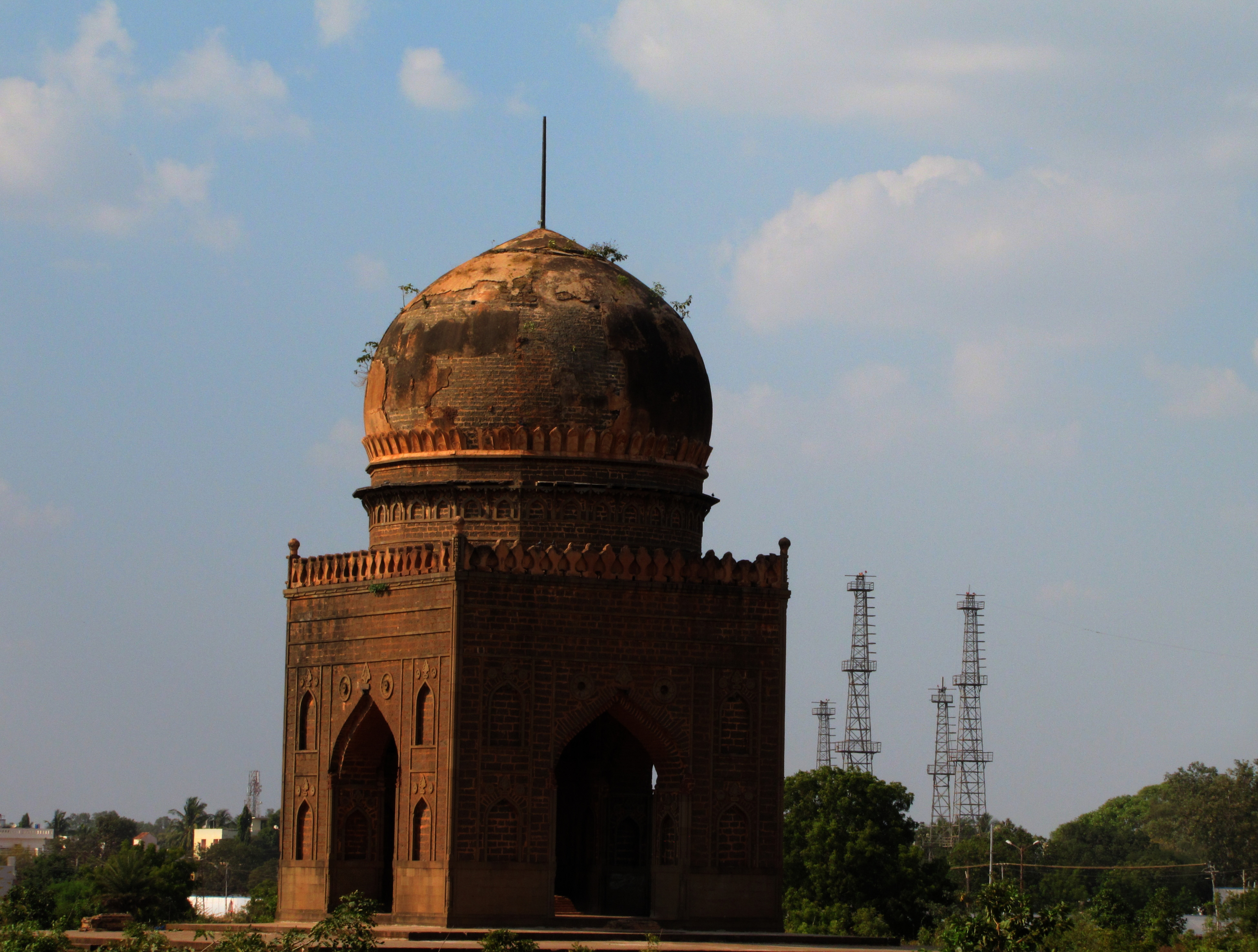
Tomb of Qasim Barid Shah I

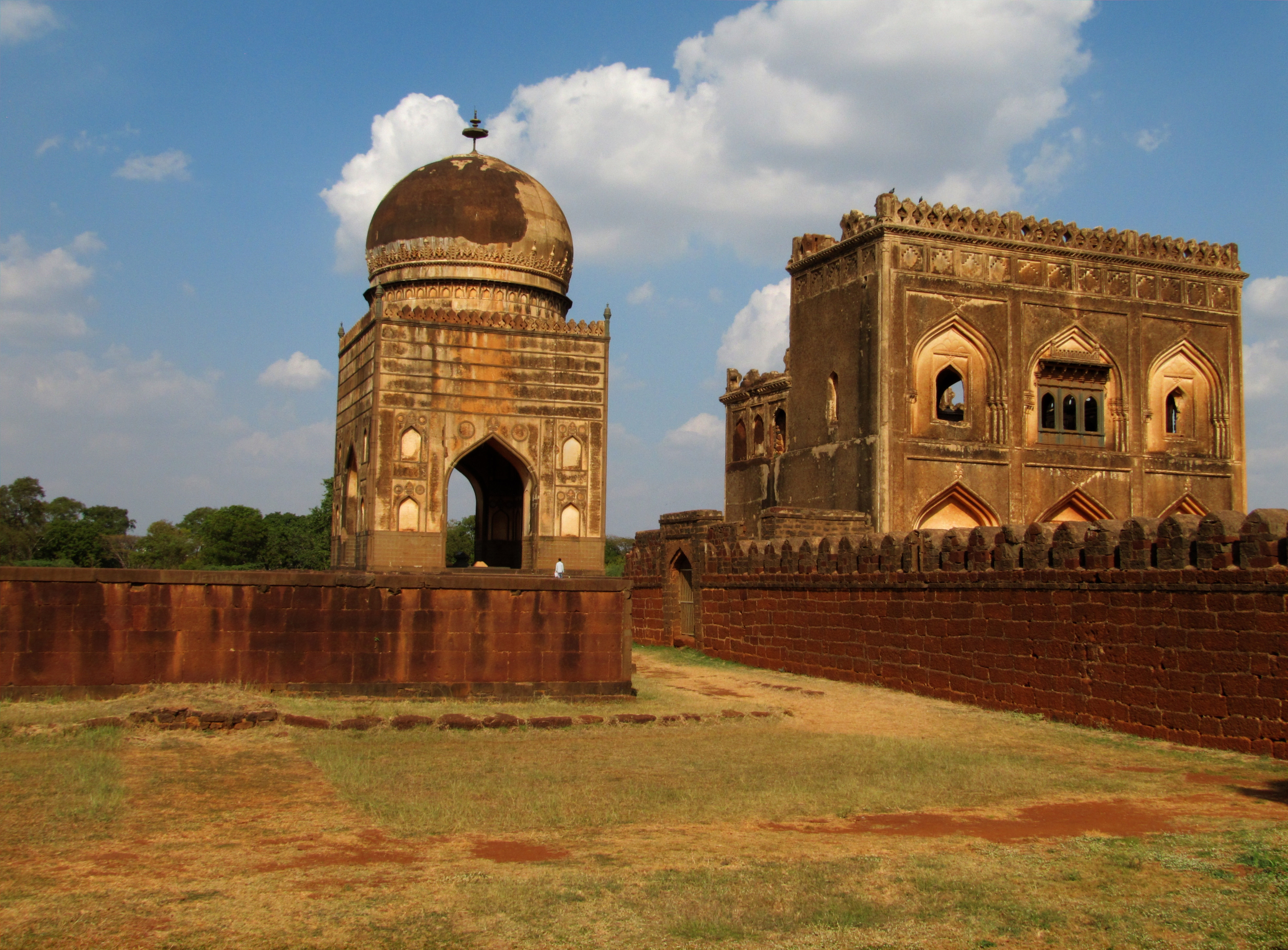
Tomb of Ali Barid Shah I along with the two-storied gateway

The Barid Shahi tombs are tombs of the Barid Shahi dynasty. They are located in Bidar in the Indian state of Karnataka.

== History ==
The Barid Shahi dynasty ruled between 1492 and 1695.

They were built during the medieval period in the 16th and 17th centuries.

== Architecture ==
The tombs were built in the Indo-Islamic style typical of the Deccan Sultanates. Similar necropolises include the Qutb Shahi tombs in Hyderabad. They are set in a garden, of which a few mango and tamarind trees still survive.

=== Tomb of Qasim Barid ===
The Tomb of Qasim Barid lies to the East of his son Amir Barid's unfinished tomb.

=== Tomb of Amir Barid ===
Amir Barid lies in an unfinished tomb. He began the construction of his tomb, however, he died in 1542 CE before the tomb could be completed.

=== Tomb of Ali Barid ===
The tomb of Ali Barid was completed in 984 Hijri (1576-1577 CE), three years before his death.

=== Tomb of Ibrahim Barid ===
The tomb of Ibrahim Barid is a replica of his father Ali Barid's tomb. The tomb is located on a raised platform 6 feet tall.

A two storied gateway leads to the tomb enclosure.

There are several graves within the enclosure, under the shade of mango trees.

=== Tomb of Qasim Barid II ===
The tomb is to the south of Ibrahim Barid's tomb.

Several other tombs are located on the platform.

=== Idgah ===
There is an idgah at the eastern end of Qasim Barid's tomb. The idgah might have been constructed during the Bahmani period.

== Preservation ==
The Archaeological Survey of India has listed the site as a monument of national importance. The complex, along with other sites in Bidar, Gulbarga, Bijapur, and Hyderabad is also listed on the tentative list of the World Heritage Sites.

== See also ==
- Chahartaq (architecture)
