= Ali Barid Shah I =

Sultan of Bidar from 1542 to 1580

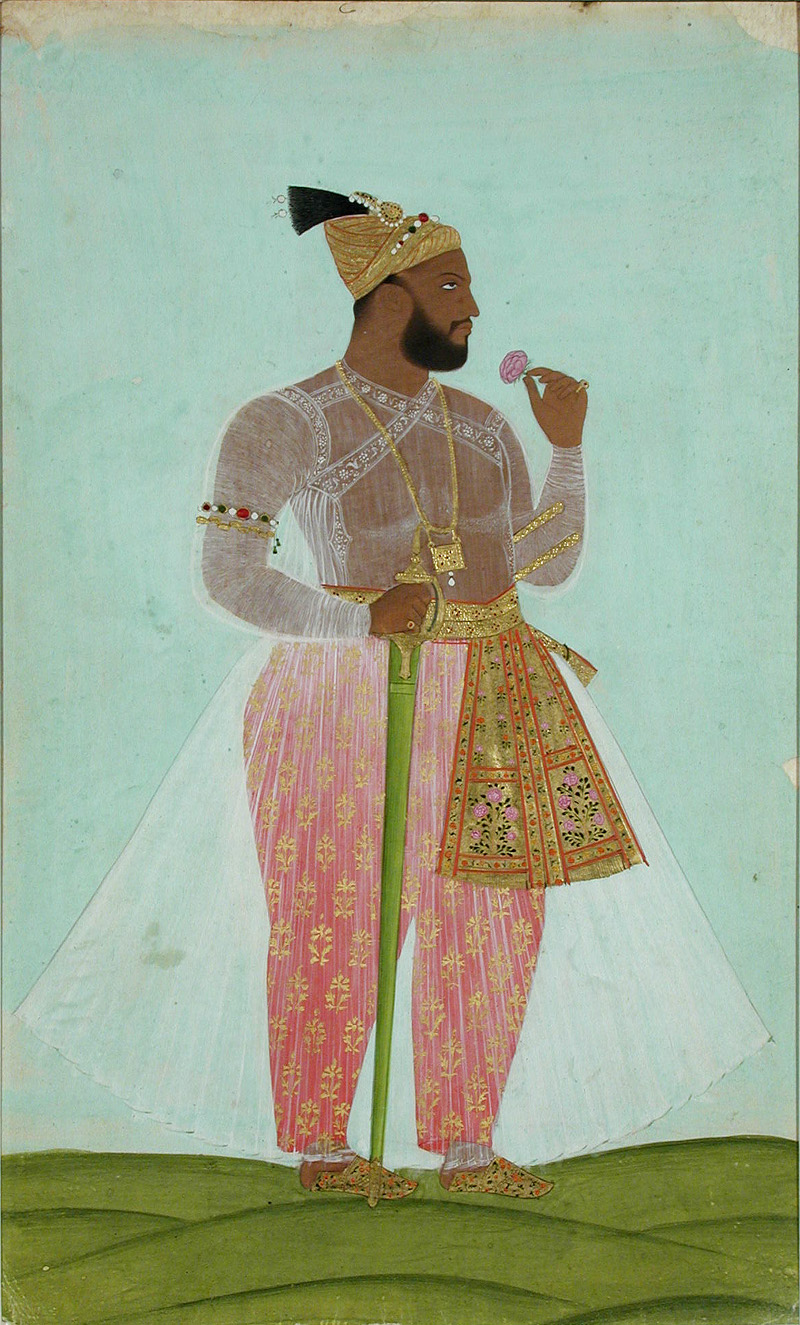
- Ali Barid Shah I of Bidar Sultanate

3rd Sultan of Bidar
- Reign: 1542–1580
- Predecessor: Amir Barid I
- Successor: Ibrahim Barid Shah
- Died: 1580
- Burial: Barid Shahi tombs, Bidar
- Father: Amir Barid I
- Religion: Islam

Ali Barid Shah I was the third ruler of the Barid Shahi dynasty at Bidar. He succeeded his father in 1540, and ruled until his death in 1580. He was considered a man of letters, and invited scholars and craftsmen from all over the Indian subcontinent to his capital. He is also known to have played a key logistical role in the Battle of Talikota.

== Reign ==
He was the third ruler of the Barid Shahi dynasty, but the first to assume royal titles.

During his reign, Bidar was attacked by Murtaza Nizam Shah, who intended to annex it as a jagir for his general Sahib Khan. The Nizam Shahi army was also reinforced by troops from the Golconda Sultanate. Ali Barid sought assistance from Ali Adil Shah I of Bijapur, who sent a thousand horsemen towards the cause. The Nizam Shahi army later returned to their capital in order to quell a rebellion.

Ali Barid was also in attendance at the Battle of Talikota, where the Deccan Sultanates united against the Vijayanagara Empire. He played a key logistical role in the battle.

He ordered the construction of his own tomb, which was completed in 1576. Another building commissioned by him was the Rangin Mahal within the Bidar Fort. Ali Barid died in 1579. (Note: Firishta's history and the inscriptions on Ali Barid's tomb mention the year of his demise to be 987 Hijri, which may correspond to 1579 or 1580 in the Gregorian calendar. The exact date or month of his death is not known. However, historians consider it to be 1580 as it is consistent with the fact that his successor Ibrahim Barid Shah ruled for seven years.)

== Gallery ==
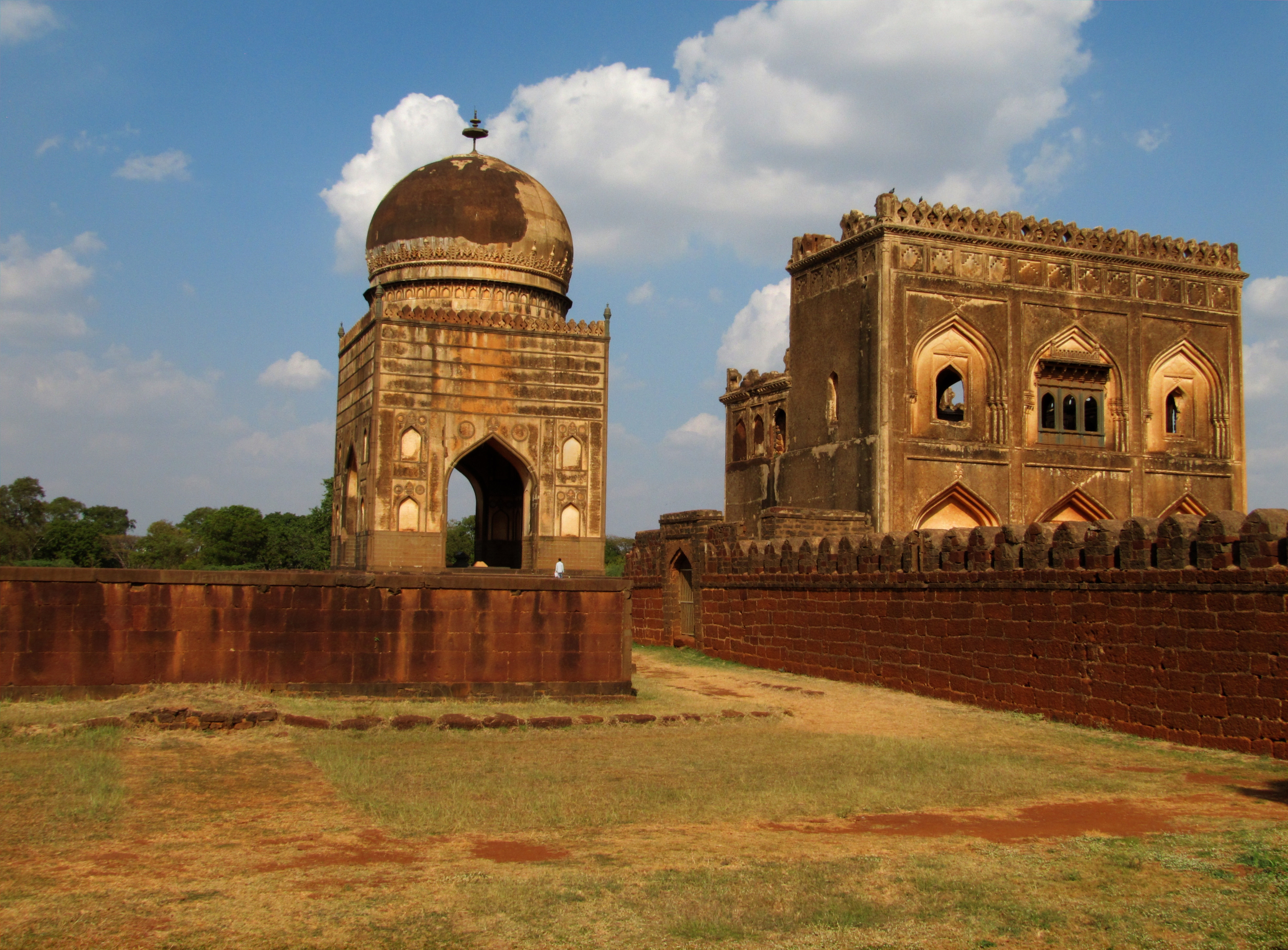
Tomb of Ali Barid Shah of Bidar Sultanate.

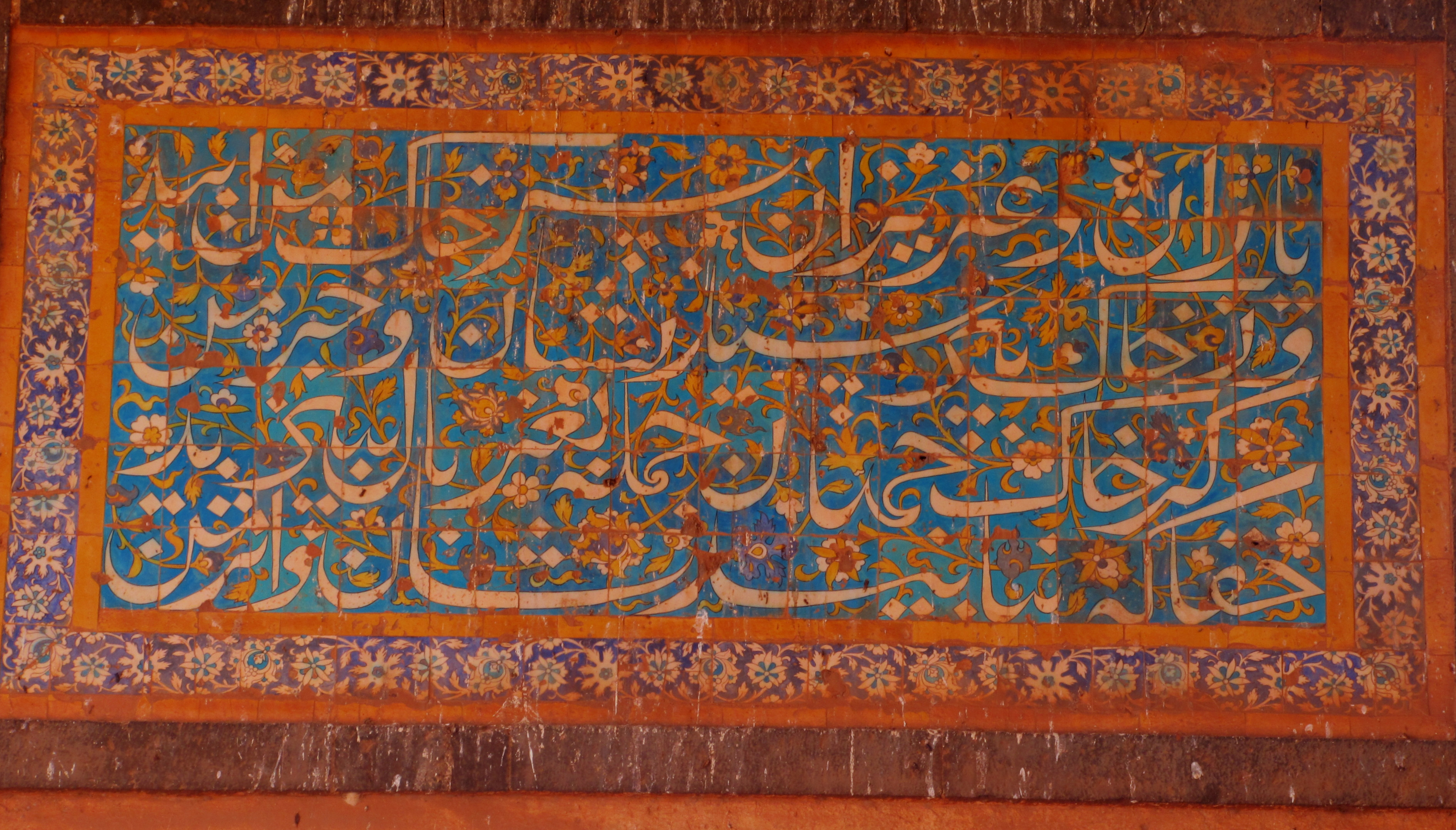
Frescoed calligraphy at wall of Tomb of Ali Barid Shah.

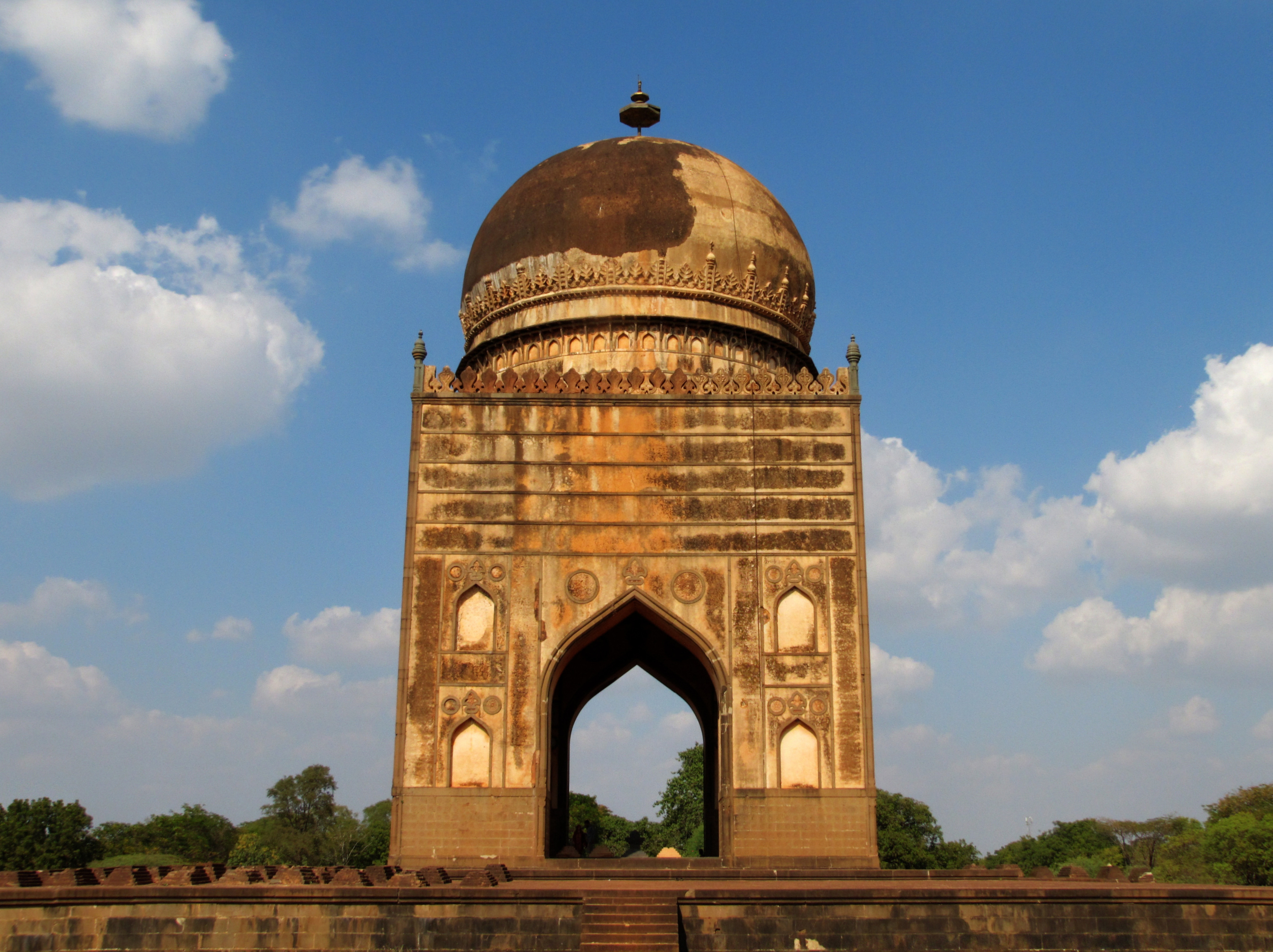
Tomb of Ali Barid Shah of Bidar Sultanate.

== See also ==
- Deccan sultanates
