= Sabaji Koli =

Commander-in-chief of the army of Ahmednagar Sultanate

Parvat Rai Shri Sabaji Koli Commander-In-Chief of Ahmednagar Army
- Nickname(s): Pratapraja
- Allegiance: Ahmadnagar Sultanate
- Service / branch: Army
- Rank: Commander-in-chief
- Battles / wars: Siege of Ahmednagar Fort

Sabaji Koli was the commander-in-chief of the army of Ahmednagar Sultanate. Sultan Burhan Nizam Shah of Ahmednagar conferred the title of Parvat Rai on Sabaji Koli. After the Sultan's death, Koli fought against the Vijayanagara Empire during the reign of the new Sultan Husain Nizam Shah. Burhan Nizam Shah also used to call Sabaji Koli Prataparaja, Parashurampratap and Narasimha Pratap.

After the death of Sultan Burhan Nizam Shah in 1533, the throne of the Sultanate of Ahmednagar was taken over by Sultan Hussain Nizam Shah. After the death of Hussain Nizam Shah in 1565, Sabaji Koli was commander under Murtaza Nizam Shah I.

== History ==
During the rule of Sultan Hussain Nizam Shah, Ali Adil Shah of Bijapur Sultanate fought against the Ahmednagar Sultanate allied with the Emperor Alia Ram Raya of the Vijayanagara Empire and attacked and surrounded the Ahmednagar Fort.

The Sultan of Bijapur Sultanate, Ali Adil Shah I, along with his Adilshahi army attacked the Ahmednagar army with reference to Vijayanagara. Sabaji Koli, along with some other comrades, clashed with the Bijapur army over the Ahmednagar army.

In battle, Sabaji Koli killed Ali Adil Shah's uncle. But later, Savaji Koli and 3000 other soldiers were also killed in this war.

== See also ==
- List of Koli people
- Bahadur Shah's invasion of Deccan
