= Bidar Sultanate =

Late mediaeval Indian kingdom (1492–1619)

- 1492–1619
- Bidar Sultanate in the 1525, with neighbouring polities.
- Capital: Bidar
- Common languages: Persian (official); Deccani Urdu
- Religion: State religion: Sunni Islam Other: Other religions in South Asia
- Government: Monarchy
- Sultan
  - 1489 – 1504: Qasim Barid I
  - 1609 – 1619: Amir Barid Shah III (last)
- History
  - Established: 1492
  - Disestablished: 1619
- Currency: Mohur
Preceded by	Succeeded by
Bahmani Sultanate	Bijapur Sultanate
- Today part of: India

The Bidar Sultanate (Note: Persian: برید شاهیان) was an early modern sultanate located in the central Deccan, ruled by the Barid Shahi dynasty. One of the five Deccan sultanates, its initial territory corresponded to that of one of the five provinces of the Bahmani Sultanate, and under the rule of Qasim Barid I in 1492 assumed de facto control of state affairs of the Bahmani Sultanate.

Leadership passed to his sons; Amir Barid I in 1504 and Ali Barid Shah I in 1542. Starting from the 1580s as a result of Ali's death, a wave of successions occurred in the rulership of the dynasty which ended in 1609 under the last sultan, Amir Barid III. He was eventually defeated in 1619 by Ibrahim Adil Shah II of the Bijapur Sultanate, who annexed the territory of the Bidar Sultanate into his realm.

== History ==
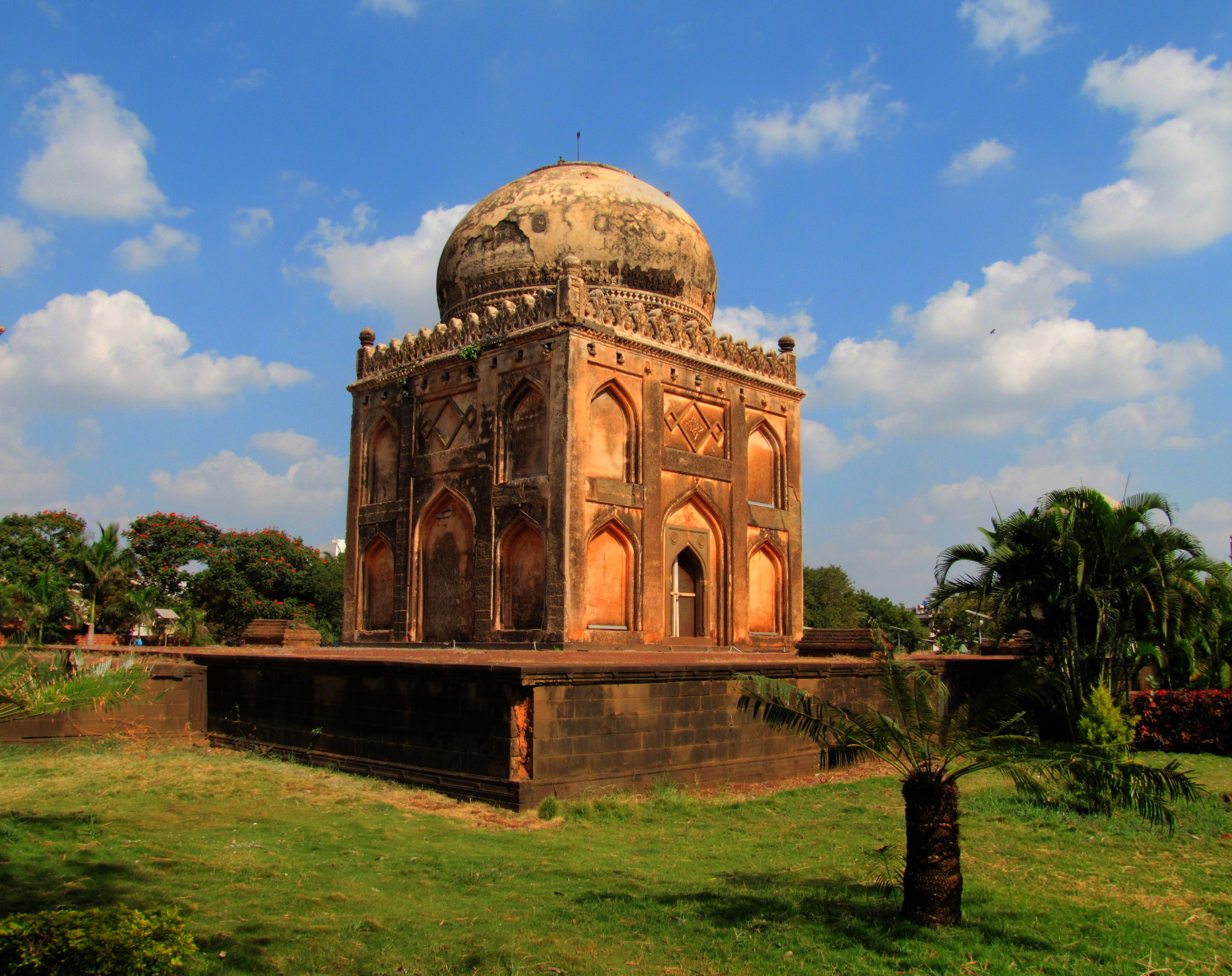
Tombs of the Bidar Shahi sultans at Barid Shahi Park in Bidar

=== Qasim Barid and Amir Barid ===
The sultanate was founded in 1492 by Qasim Barid I, who was a Turk. He joined the service of the Bahmani Sultan Muhammad Shah III. He started his career as a sar-naubat, and was made kotwal of Bidar by Nizam-ul-Mulk, for helping the Deccanis in the massacre of the foreign population at Bidar. However, he later became the mir-jumla (prime minister) of the Bahmani Sultanate. During the reign of Mahmood Shah Bahmani II (r. 1482 – 1518), he became the de facto ruler of the Bahmani Sultanate.

After the death of Mahmud Shah Bahmani in 1518, he was succeeded by four sultans, one after another, but they were mere puppets in the hands of Amir Barid.

When the last Bahmani ruler Kalimullah fled to Bidar in 1527, Amir Barid I became practically independent, as his de jure suzerain's state ceased to exist. However, he never assumed any royal title.

=== Ali Barid Shah ===
In 1542, Amir was succeeded by his son Ali Barid Shah I, who was the first to assume the royal title of Shah. Ali Barid joined the other Deccan sultans in the Battle of Talikota against the Vijayanagar Empire in January 1565.

=== Later rulers ===
After his death in 1580, Ali Barid was succeeded by his son Ibrahim Barid, who ruled for seven years until his death in 1587. He was succeeded by his younger brother Qasim Barid II. After his death in 1591, he was succeeded by his infant son Ali Barid II, who was soon dethroned by one of his relative, Amir Barid II. In 1601, he was also overthrown by one of his relative, Mirza Ali Barid.

In 1609, he was succeeded by the last ruler, Amir Barid III, who fought against the Mughals in 1616 under the leadership of Malik Ambar. In 1619, he was defeated by the Bijapur sultan Ibrahim Adil Shah II. Bidar was annexed to Bijapur sultanate. Amir Barid III and his sons were brought to Bijapur and kept "under surveillance".

== Culture ==
=== Architecture ===
The Bidar Sultanate made considerable additions to the Bidar Fort. Their tombs, the Barid Shahi tombs, were their main architectural pursuits, and are also located at Bidar. The rulers employed Hindu architects and engineers for the construction of these buildings, which resulted in amalgamation of some Hindu features within the architecture of this period.

== Rulers ==
Name	Reign
Qasim Barid I	1489 – 1504
Amir Barid I	1504 – 1542
Ali Barid Shah I	1542 – 1580
Ibrahim Barid Shah	1580 – 1587
Qasim Barid Shah II	1587 – 1591
Ali Barid Shah II	1591
Amir Barid Shah II	1591 – 1601
Ali Barid Shah III	1601 – 1609
Amir Barid Shah III	1609 – 1619

== Gallery ==
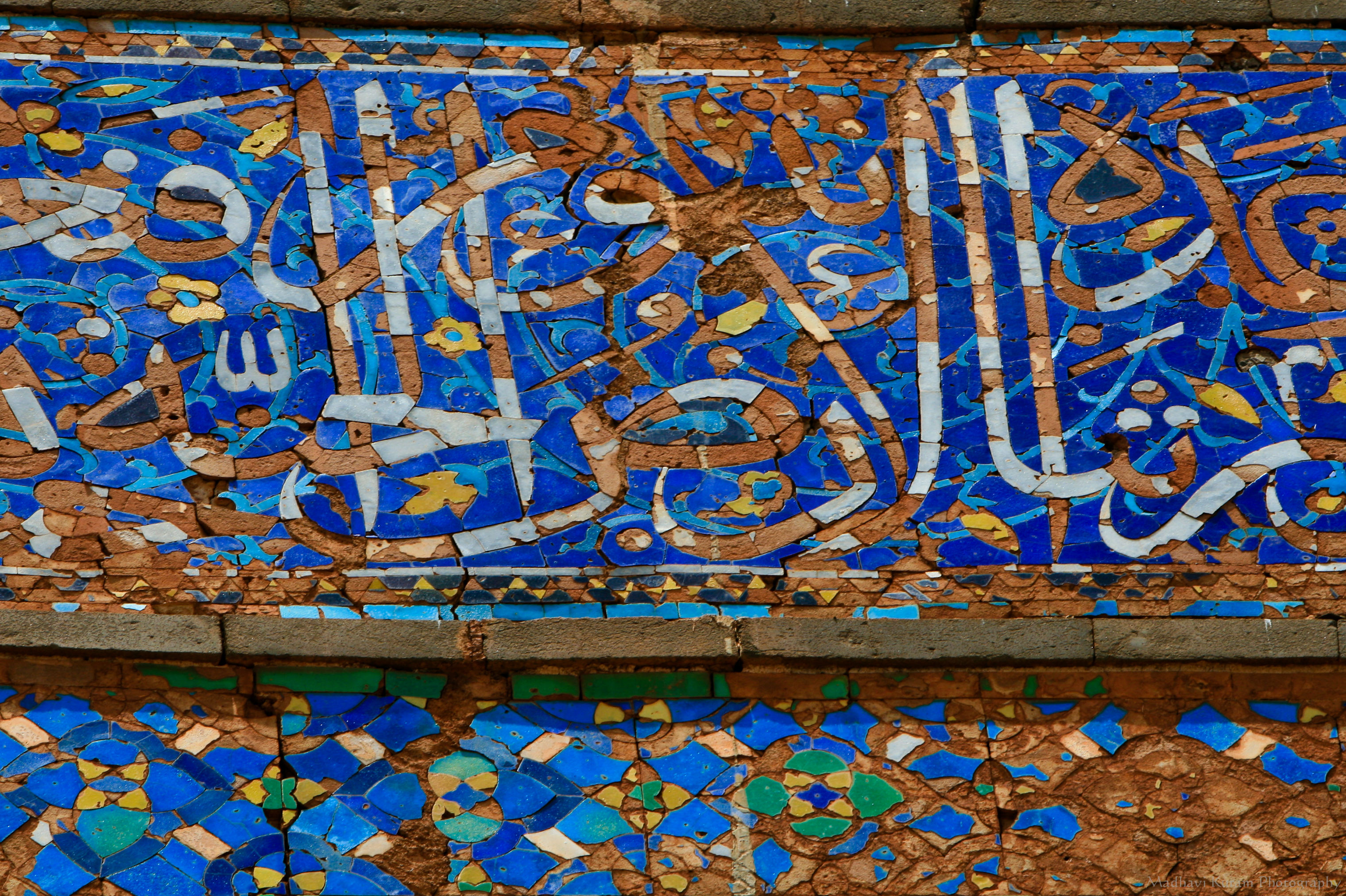
Calligraphy in coloured tiles

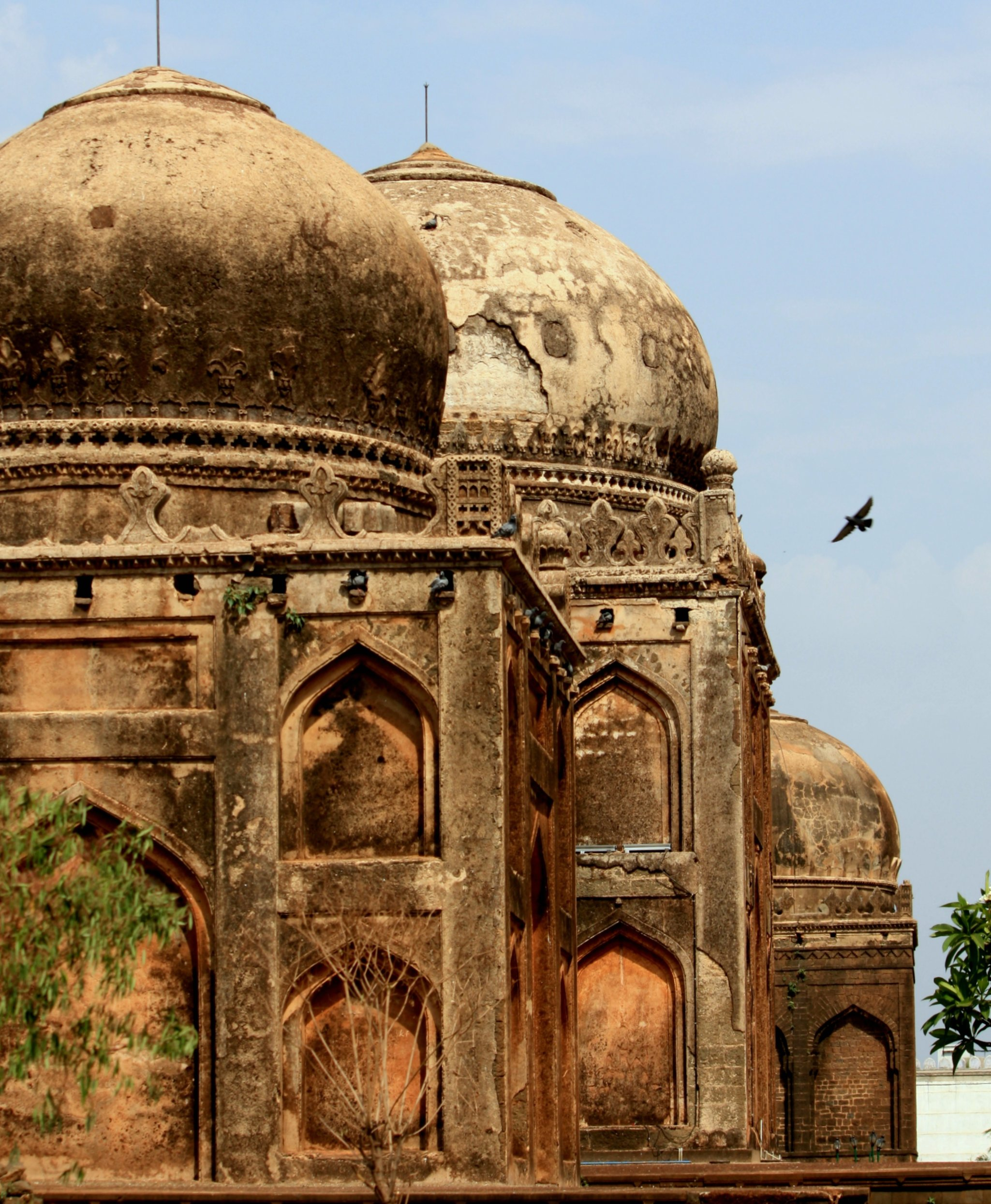
Ashtur Tombs

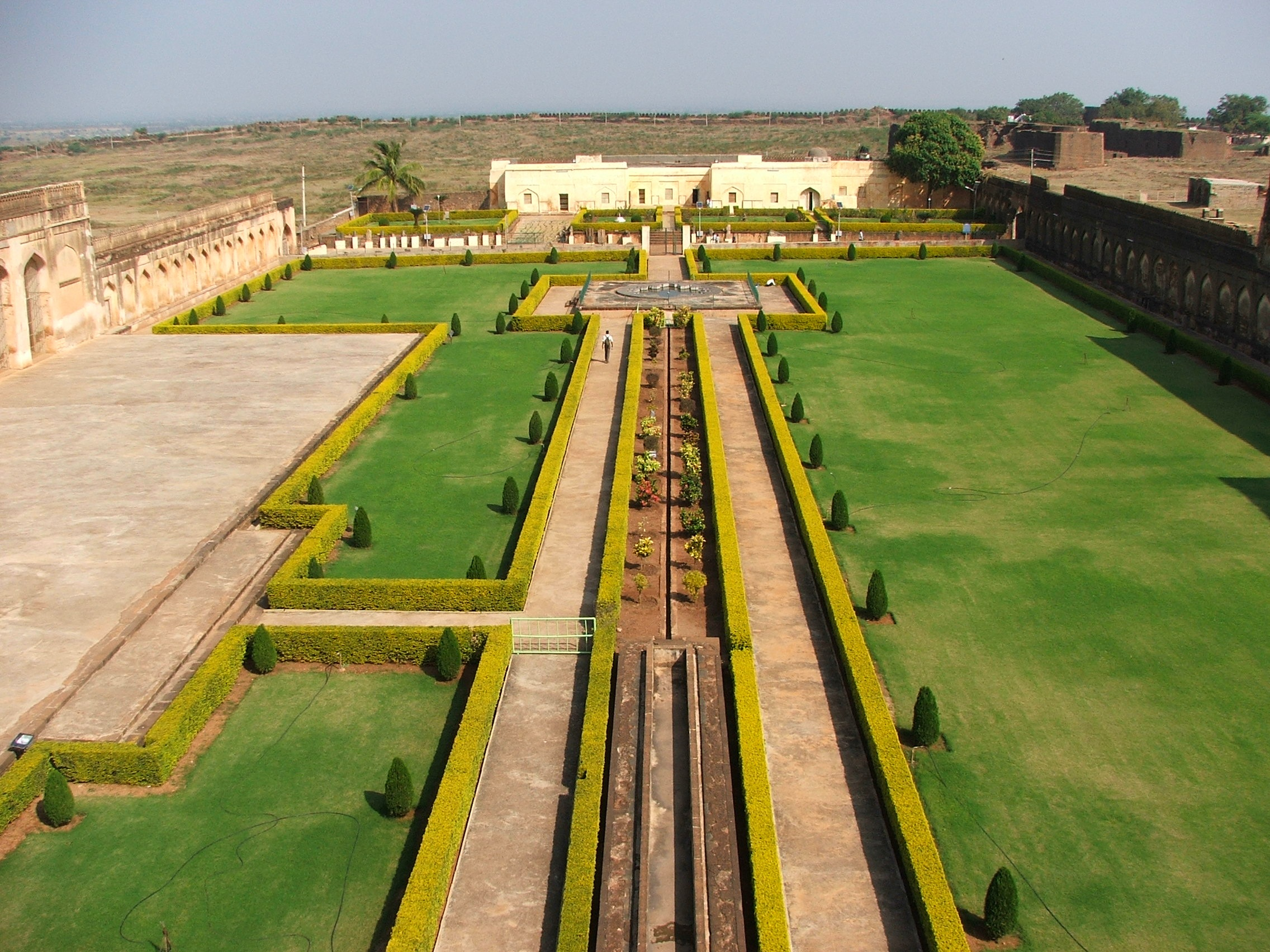
Bidar Fort (inside view garden)

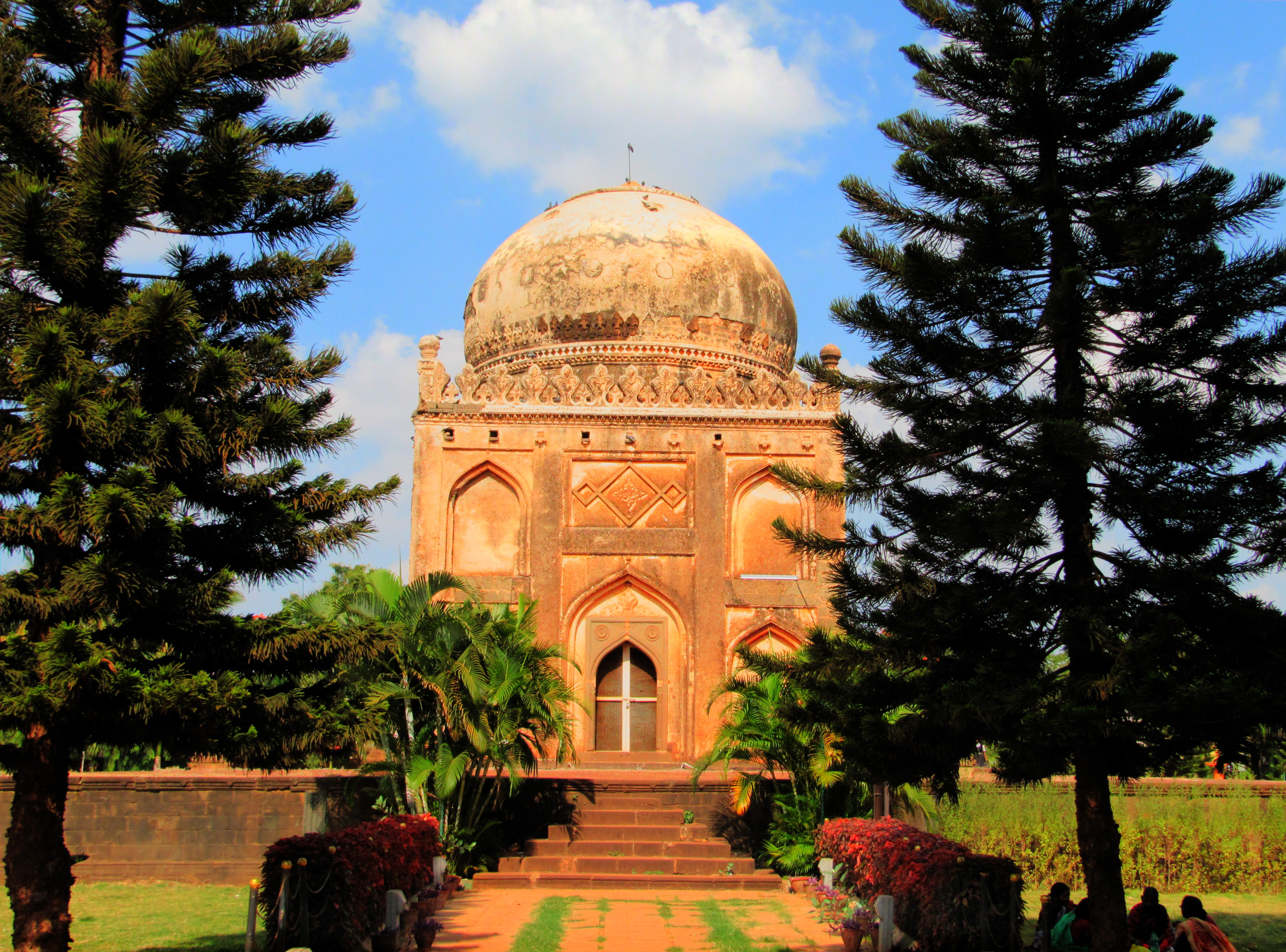
Tombs of Bidar Shahi kings at Barid Shahi Park in Bidar

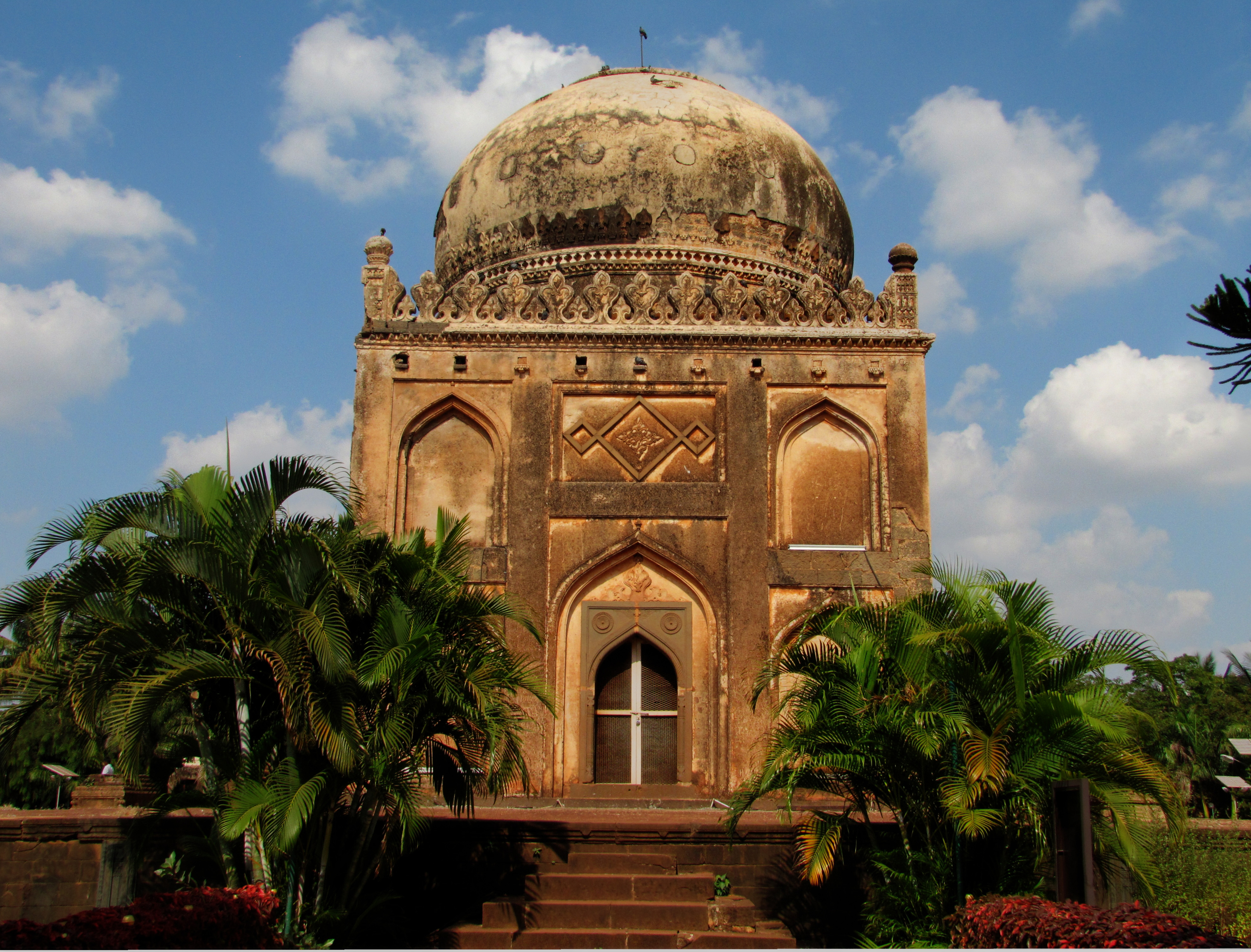
Tombs at Barid Shahi Park in Bidar

== See also ==
- List of Shi'a Muslims dynasties
- Battle of Talikota
