= Nayaka dynasties =

Dynasties that emerged in India

Nayakas
- Religions: Hinduism
- Languages: Telugu, Tamil, Kannada, Sinhala
- Country: India; Sri Lanka
- Populated states: Andhra Pradesh • Telangana • Tamil Nadu • Karnataka • Central Province
- Region: Southern India; Kandyan Highlands

The Nayaka dynasties refers to a group of Hindu dynasties who emerged during the Kakatiya dynasty and the Vijayanagara Empire period in South India. Many of these dynasties, such as the Madurai Nayaks and the Thanjavur Nayaks, were originally military governors under the Vijayanagara Empire, who, after the Battle of Talikota, declared themselves independent and established their own polities.

The foundations of Nayaka power were laid during the Kakatiya era, where the Nayankara system first organised military leaders into a cohesive political force. Following the fall of Orugallu, the Musunuri Nayakas of the 14th century led a confederacy against the Delhi Sultanate, reclaiming Orugallu in 1336 CE and establishing an independent sovereign state. Their emergence marked a significant phase of resistance against Muslim forces, and represented the first major indigenous movement to restore cultural and political autonomy in the region. This resistance was later strongly developed and institutionalised under the Vijayanagara Empire, which expanded the Nayaka role into a standardised administrative and military framework across South India.

== History ==
=== Origin ===
The roots of the Nayaka dynasties can be traced back to the Kakatiya dynasty, which ruled the Telugu region of Andhra Pradesh and Telangana, from the 12th to the early 14th century. The Kakatiya period was a formative era for Telugu society, witnessing the rise of a powerful warrior class that was drawn from communities of local peasants and pastoralists. These warriors, who would later be known as Nayakas, were integrated into the Kakatiya political network through an administrative system known as Nayankara. Under this system, the Kakatiya empire was divided into 77 Nayankaras, each under the control of a Nayaka who served as a military chief and provincial governor. These Nayakas belonged to various social groups, reflecting how the Kakatiya rulers actively built a military political coalition that deepened the state's reach into rural areas and created a new, mobile ruling elite of Telugu warriors. This social and political landscape, laid the essential groundwork for the emergence of the Nayakas as a powerful force in the Deccan and South India.

=== Musunuri Nayakas ===
The first major assertion of Nayaka power and influence emerged in the immediate aftermath of the Kakatiya fall. Prolaya Nayaka, a chieftain from Musunuru in present day Eluru district of Andhra Pradesh, emerged as a leader of resistance. Uniting 76 Nayakas clans, gaining crucial support from his three uncles Deva Nayaka, Kama Nayaka, and Raja Nayaka, as well as his cousin Kapaya Nayaka.The alliance was formed in response to the devastation inflicted upon the Telugu country and represented a resurgence aimed at re-establishing indigenous Hindu rule in the region. Recognising the Delhi Sultanate's superiority in conventional warfare, Prolaya Nayaka adopted guerrilla tactics, operating from a forest base at Rekapalle in the Bhadrachalam region. He successfully expelled Muslim forces from Rajahmundry and secured the Krishna Godavari delta, thereby reestablishing indigenous Hindu rule in the area. After Prolaya Nayaka, his cousin Kapaya Nayaka assumed leadership and continued the liberation campaign. He led the Nayaka confederation to a historic victory by driving the Delhi Sultanate out of Orugallu (Warangal), the former Kakatiya capital, effectively ending Sultanate's rule over the Telugu country by the 1330s. Kapaya Nayaka then established his own kingdom, ruling from Warangal and seeking to restore the political order that had existed under the Kakatiyas.

However, this success was soon challenged by the rising power of the Bahmani Sultanate. The situation worsened when their former allies, the Recherla Nayakas, eventually shifted their allegiance to the Bahmanis. In 1368, Kapaya Nayaka was defeated in a major battle against the combined Bahmani Recherla forces. The Recherla Nayakas subsequently annexed the Musunuri territories, ending the first significant Nayaka attempt at independent kingdom building in the post Kakatiya era. The Musunuri Nayaka revolt stands as one of the earliest moments in India and the first in South India of organised Hindu self rule resisting external domination.

=== Under the Vijayanagara Empire ===
Following the decline of the Musunuri Nayakas, the Vijayanagara Empire emerged as the dominant power in South India, and it was under that the Nayakas consolidated their prominence across South India. The empire's administrative system, relied heavily on the military governors known as Nayakas to oversee its provinces. These Nayakas, many of whom were Telugu warriors from Telugu social communities that had first risen to prominence under the Kakatiyas, were granted territories (nayankaras) in exchange for military service and tribute. Vijayanagara rulers, especially after Krishnadeva Raya's campaigns in the early 16th century, systematically expanded their control into the deep south, dividing the Tamil country into three major nayakships of Madurai, Thanjavur, and Gingee, and appointing their trusted Telugu commanders to govern them. This policy not only consolidated imperial control but also created a powerful class of regional lords who commanded their own armies, collected revenue, and established hereditary claims over their territories, all while maintaining nominal allegiance to the Vijayanagara throne.

The Vijayanagara Empire's dominance was shattered on 23 January 1565, at the Battle of Talikota, where a united alliance of the Deccan Sultanates, decisively defeated the imperial forces led by the powerful commander Rama Raya. The battle resulted in Rama Raya's capture and execution, and the victorious Sultanate armies proceeded to plunder the capital city of Vijayanagara, causing catastrophic damage. In the aftermath, Rama Raya's brother Tirumala Deva Raya established the Aravidu dynasty at Penukonda to carry forward the Vijayanagara legacy. The Pemmasani Nayaks played a pivotal role in this dynastic transition, helping the Aravidu kings ascend the throne during the power shift from the Tuluva dynasty. Aravidu dynasty rose to power following a civil war, largely because of the support of Pemmasani Erra Timmanayudu. Along with other influential Telugu clans such as the Ravella Nayaks and Sayapaneni Nayaks, the Pemmasanis provided crucial military support to the Aravidu rulers, helping them sustain resistance against the Deccan Sultanates for 90 years, ending with the capture of Gandikota in 1652 and the defeat of Pemmasani Timmanayudu by Mir Jumla.

The Madurai Nayaks, Thanjavur Nayaks, Nayaks of Gingee, Keladi Nayakas, and Nayakas of Kalahasti, among others, transformed their former governorships into sovereign kingdoms, establishing their own dynasties that would rule large parts of South India for the following 200 years. The Nayaka kingdoms became the new political reality of post Vijayanagara South India .

== Language ==
The Nayaka era is characterised by a unique multilingualism that bridged the linguistic divides of South India. While the ruling clans were of Telugu origin, their administrative and cultural reach necessitated a deep engagement with the local languages of the regions they governed.

Telugu: As the mother tongue of the majority of the Nayaka clans, the language experienced a "Golden Age" of creative revival. While these rulers were polyglots who governed in the local vernaculars of their subjects, Telugu remained the primary vehicle of their cultural identity and ancestral heritage. This linguistic bond was upheld across all major lineages of Telugu root, including the Musunuri Nayakas, Ravella Nayaks, Sayapaneni Nayaks, Recherla Nayakas, Pemmasani Nayaks and Suryadevara Nayaks clans of the Andhra heartland, as well as the Madurai Nayaks, Thanjavur Nayaks, Nayaks of Gingee, Nayaks of Vellore and Nayakas of Kalahasti of the Tamil region, and the Kandy Nayakars of Sri Lanka.

Tamil: In Tamil regions, the Madurai Nayaks, Thanjavur Nayaks, Nayaks of Gingee, Nayaks of Vellore and Nayakas of Kalahasti were significant patrons of Tamil literature and Shaivite/Vaishnavite devotional music. They successfully integrated Telugu political power with Tamil cultural identity by sponsoring the composition of Tamil literary works and the extensive renovation of major temples, including the Meenakshi Amman Temple, Ranganathaswamy Temple, Ramanathaswamy Temple, Brihadisvara Temple, and the Jambukeswarar Temple.

Kannada: The Nayakas of Keladi, Nayakas of Chitradurga, and Nayakas of Belur were instrumental in the preservation and promotion of Kannada literature and the Lingayat tradition.

Sinhala: With the establishment of the Nayaks of Kandy in Sri Lanka, the dynasty underwent a significant linguistic shift. To integrate with the local populace and the Buddhist clergy, the Nayakar kings became patrons of the Sinhala language and adopted Sinhala names. They were the final sovereign protectors of the Sinhala Buddhist tradition. But the Nayaka kings maintained the linguistic roots as they continued to speak Telugu within the "Antahpuram" (inner circles) and among their relatives.

== Major Nayaka kingdoms ==
The Nayaka kingdoms included the following:

- Musunuri Nayakas, 14th century warrior-kings from Andhra Pradesh and Telangana.
- Recherla Nayakas, 14th–15th century rulers from Telangana.
- Ravella Nayaks, 14th–17th century ruling clan from Andhra Pradesh.
- Sayapaneni Nayaks, 14th–17th century ruling clan from Andhra Pradesh.
- Pemmasani Nayaks, 14th–17th century ruling clan from Andhra Pradesh.
- Suryadevara Nayaks, 14th–16th century ruling clan from Andhra Pradesh.
- Madurai Nayaks, 16th–18th century Telugu rulers of Tamil Nadu.
- Thanjavur Nayaks, 16th–17th century Telugu rules of Thanjavur, Tamil Nadu.
- Nayaks of Gingee (Senji), 16th–17th century Telugu rulers from Tamil Nadu, previously governors of the Vijayanagara Empire.
- Nayakas of Belur, 15th–18th century rulers from Karnataka.
- Nayakas of Chitradurga, 16th–18th century from Karnataka, previously feudatory chiefs of Hoysala and Vijayanagara Empire.
- Nayakas of Keladi, 16th–18th century ruling dynasty from Keladi, Karnataka.
- Nayaks of Vellore, 16th century Telugu chieftains under the Vijayanagara Empire from Channapatna and Rayadurgam.
- Nayakas of Kalahasti, 17th–18th century rulers of Kalahasti and Vandavasi. (Note: The last name of the rulers is also found written as Nayak, Nayakudu, Nayudu, or Nayakkar, depending on the language and orientation of the writers. The first name (which is a family name) is also written as Damal, a simplified form.)
- Nayaks of Kandy, Telugu rulers of the Sri Lanka between 1739 and 1815.
- Nayakas of Shorapur, rulers of Shorapur, Karnataka (final ruler was the 19th century Raja Venkatappa).
- Hande Nayakas of Bellary, between the 15th to early 19th century, who were initially vassals of Vijayanagar, and then subsequently few became vassals to the Bijapur Sultanate.
- Channapatna Nayaka Dynasty, 16th to 17th century rulers of Channapatna from 1578 to 1669 CE.
