= Sayapaneni Nayaks =

Telugu Hindu clan, South India (16th to 19th century)

- 1509–1802
- Status: Dynasty
- Common languages: Telugu
- Religion: Hinduism
- Government: Governors under the Vijayanagara Empire; (Monarchy)
- Historical era: Medieval India
  - Established: 1509
  - Disestablished: 1802
Preceded by	Succeeded by
Kakatiya dynasty; Musunuri Nayakas	Golconda Sultanate
- Today part of: India

The Sayapaneni Nayaks were a prominent Telugu Hindu dynasty that significantly shaped the political and military landscape of South India from the early 16th to the early 19th century. Originating in the Andhra region, they belonged to the Kamma community and were one of the 37 major Kamma Nayak clans that emerged following the dissolution of the Kakatiya dynasty and gained influence, particularly under the Vijayanagara Empire.

Their rise commenced in the post Musunuri Nayakas period, with their prominence establishing itself in central Andhra, specifically in the Dupati Seema (Dupadu) region near Srisailam. This was initiated by a Jagir from Krishnadevaraya of Vijayanagara, who, around 1509 CE, granted administrative control of the Dupadu Region to Shayappanayadu, then a twenty year old from the family. Subsequent consolidation of this area by his descendants, including Vengala Nayudu and Venkatadri Nayudu, as detailed in the Dupadu Kaifiyat, is considered as a period of stable governance.

They consolidated a vast estate encompassing approximately 533 villages across what are now the Prakasam, Guntur, and Kurnool districts of Andhra Pradesh. They were instrumental in safeguarding the empire's northern frontier, often collaborating with other influential Kamma clans like the Pemmasani Nayaks and Ravella Nayaks. Venkatadri’s marriage to Venkatamba, the sister of Pemmasani Thimma Nayudu, strengthened their regional ties. Notable leaders such as Sayapaneni Venkatadri Nayudu and Sayapaneni Vengala Nayudu played crucial roles in repelling incursions from the Bahmani and later the Golconda Sultanates.

The decline of the Sayapaneni Nayaks began with the fall of the Vijayanagara Empire after the Battle of Talikota in 1565. While they, along with the Ravella and Pemmasani Nayaks, initially continued to resist the expanding Deccan Sultanates, particularly the Golconda Sultanate, this resistance gradually waned. A significant blow came in 1652 when Gandikota, the crucial stronghold of the Pemmasani Nayaks, fell to Mir Jumla, symbolising the establishment of Muslim rule in the region. Ultimately, the Dupadu principality, still under Sayapaneni control, was annexed by the British East India Company in 1802, thereby ending their political autonomy, though descendants of the family remained influential as zamindars and local elites under British rule.

== History ==
=== Origin ===
The Sayapaneni Nayaks, belonged to the Kamma social group, a prominent Telugu community in South India. After the fall of the Musunuri Nayakas around 1370 CE, several Kamma clans, including the Sayapanenis, migrated to the newly established Vijayanagara Empire. They quickly rose to prominence as key figures in the empire’s military and administrative hierarchy, serving under successive dynasties. The rise of the Sayapaneni Nayaks began when Krishnadevaraya granted a Jagir at Gudipadu (near Srisailam) to Shayappanayadu, then a twenty year old from the family, marking the foundation of their principality.

=== Extent ===
The Sayapaneni governed Dupatiseema, a strategically crucial area, in alliance with the Vijayanagara Empire. They maintained influence through successive dynasties, mainly Tuluva dynasty and Aravidu dynasty. Notable rulers included Gangayya Nayudu (reigned c. 1564) and Venkatadri Nayudu (reigned c. 1589), the latter also known as a poet who authored Sakalajanasajivanamu. Venkatadri’s marriage to Venkatamba, the sister of Pemmasani Thimma Nayudu, strengthened their regional ties. Vengala Nayudu and Venkatadri Nayudu, expanded their territory and consolidated control over the Dupadu Seema, an estate comprising approximately 533 villages spread across present day Prakasam, Guntur, and Kurnool districts.

=== Rule ===
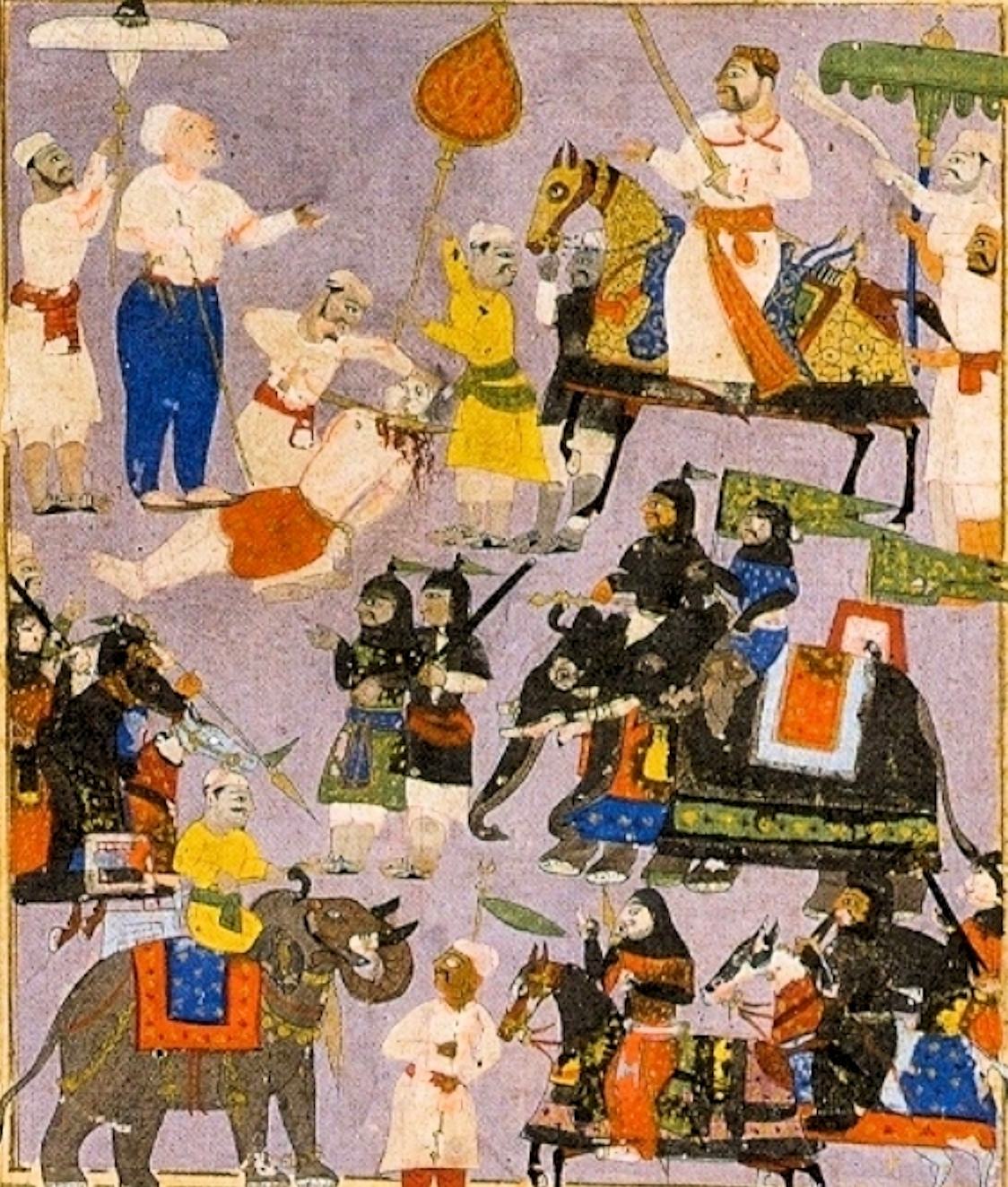
Battle of Talikota

The Sayapaneni Nayaks served as loyal military administrators and governors under the Vijayanagara Empire, particularly during its zenith and later phases of decline. The Sayapaneni Nayaks formally entered the service of the Vijayanagara Empire during the reign of Krishnadevaraya, when the emperor granted administrative control of the Dupadu region to a 20 year old noble named Sayappa Nayudu. According to the Dupati Kaifiyat, this transfer of authority marked the beginning of Sayapaneni political ascendancy. Sayappa Nayudu’s descendants, Vengala Nayudu and Venkatadri Nayudu, later expanded and consolidated this territory, establishing the Dupadu principality, which grew to encompass over 533 villages. Their rule is considered as a peaceful and culturally significant era in regional chronicles.

The Sayapanenis along with the Pemmasani and Ravella Nayaks, supported the Aravidu dynasty in the chaotic decades following the Battle of Talikota. Their local military efforts helped maintain resistance to the advancing Deccan Sultanates, particularly the Golconda Sultanate, throughout the late 16th and early 17th centuries. The Sayapaneni's real strength lied in their political pragmatism and adaptability. Guided in part by alliances with Niyogi Brahmins, they skilfully shifted allegiances to survive the region’s volatile power shifts. Initially loyal to the Vijayanagara Empire, they later aligned with the Qutb Shahi dynasty of Golconda and, subsequently, with the Asaf Jahi Nizams of Hyderabad after the fall of Vijayanagara. The principality remained under Sayapaneni control for over two centuries. The Sayapanenis managed to retain partial control of their Jagir by negotiating new allegiances with Muslim dynasties.

=== Decline ===
The decline of the Sayapaneni Nayaks began with the fall of the Vijayanagara Empire following the Battle of Talikota in 1565. Although they had made significant military and political contributions, the disintegration of the empire greatly weakened their influence. Alongside other Kamma warrior clans such as the Ravella and Pemmasani Nayaks, the Sayapanenis continued to resist the expanding power of the Deccan Sultanates, particularly the Golconda Sultanate. However, this resistance gradually diminished over time. A major blow came in 1652 when Gandikota, the key stronghold of the Pemmasani Nayaks, fell to Mir Jumla, symbolizing the consolidation of Muslim rule in the region. Eventually, in 1802, the Dupadu principality, under Sayapaneni control, was annexed by the British East India Company. This formally ended the Sayapaneni dynasty’s sovereign authority, though descendants of the family remained influential as zamindars and local elites under British rule.

== See also ==
- Musunuri Nayakas
- Pemmasani Nayaks
- Ravella Nayaks
- Nayaka dynasties
- Vijayanagara Empire
