= Siege of Penukonda (1576) =

- Part of Deccani–Vijayanagar wars
Date	1576
Location	Penukonda, Andhra Pradesh, India 14.0850°N 77.5960°E
Result	Vijaynagara-Golconda victory

Belligerents
Vijayanagara Empire; Golconda Sultanate	Bijapur Sultanate

Commanders and leaders
Sriranga I Savaram Chennappa Nayaka; Hande Timma Nayaka; Ibrahim Quli Qutb Shah Wali; Shah Muhammad anju Fazl khan	Ali Adil Shah I Mustafa Khan; Hande Timma Nayaka (AWOL)
- Location within South Asia

The Siege of Penukonda (1576) was military conflict fought between the forces of Ali Adil Shah I of Bijapur Sultanate and the Vijayanagara Empire under Sriranga I. Ali Adil Shah invaded Vijayanagara territory and laid siege to Penukonda, which was defended by the Savaram chief Chennappa Nayaka. The siege lasted for about three months, but the Bijapuri army failed to capture the fort due to the resistance of its defenders. Sriranga I sought assistance from Ibrahim Qutb Shah Wali of Golconda and also persuaded the Hande chief Timma Nayaka to abandon the Bijapuri side. On 21 December 1576, Chennappa Nayaka defeated the Bijapuri army in a sortie from the fort. After his defeat Ali Adil Shah I raised the siege and withdrew towards Bijapur.

== Background ==
Sriranga I, who succeeded his father Tirumala Deva Raya faced numerous problems in restoring the kingdom. Vijayanagara Empire had not yet recovered from the devastation caused by the Battle of Talikota. Many villages remained deserted, agricultural lands lay uncultivated, and temple worship had not been fully restored. At the same time, local chieftains and Polygars plundered the countryside and defied the authority of the Sriranga I.

Taking advantage of the weakened state of the Vijayanagara Empire, Ali Adil Shah I assembled a large army at Adoni and marched towards Penukonda at its head, accompanied by the Hande chief Timma Nayaka, who had defected to his side. His objective was to capture the city and its strategic fort. On learning of the approaching army Sriranga I entrusted the defence of his capital to the Savaram chief Chennappa Nayaka. He then withdrew to the fort of Chandragiri taking the royal treasury and other valuables with him.

== Siege ==
Ali Adil Shah I reached Penukonda and laid siege to the fort, besieging for three months. However, he was unable to capture it due to the resistance of Chennappa Nayaka. At the same time Sriranga I made strenuous efforts to relieve his capital and drive away the besieging Adil Shahi army. He sent an envoy to Golconda to seek military assistance from Ibrahim Qutb Shah Wali.

The envoy succeeded in securing Ibrahim Qutb Shah’s support for Sriranga I, largely owing to his hostility towards the Sultan of Bijapur. Ibrahim first dispatched his general Shah Muhammad Anju to raid the frontiers of the Bijapur Sultanate before advancing south with a large army to assist Sriranga I. At the same time, he sent one of his officers Fazl Khan to Chandragiri with instructions to conclude a pact with Sriranga I.

Fazl Khan successfully carried out his mission and persuaded Sriranga I to accompany him to the Golconda camp, where he personally concluded an alliance with Ibrahim Qutb Shah Wali.

Sriranga I did not rely solely on the assistance of the Qutb Shahi ruler to drive the Sultan of Bijapur from his territories. He also sought to create a rift between Ali Adil Shah I and the Hande chief Timma Nayaka. Sriranga I offered Timma a substantial bribe and persuaded him not only to abandon the Bijapuri side but also to harass the Sultan's camp. At the same time Chennappa Nayaka, who appears to have been closely observing the situation in the Adil Shahi camp sallied from the fort and defeated the Bijapur army on 21 December 1576.

== Aftermath ==
Following this defeat and the formation of an alliance between Sriranga I and Ibrahim Qutb Shah Wali, Ali Adil Shah I was compelled to raise the siege of Penukonda and withdraw towards his own territories.

== See also ==
- Babur
- Deva Raya I
- Kapilendra Deva
