= Battle of Ahobilam =

- Part of Deccani–Vijayanagar wars
Date	1579
Location	Ahobilam, Andhra Pradesh, India 15.1333°N 78.7167°E
Result	Vijaynagara victory

Belligerents
Vijayanagara Empire	Ibrahim Quli Qutb Shah Wali; Hande Nayaks

Commanders and leaders
Sriranga I Kondaraju Venkataraju; Kondaraju Tirumalaraju	Ibrahim Quli Qutb Shah Wali; Murari Rao; Malakappa Nayaka; Kadambaraya
- Location within South Asia

The Battle of Ahobilam was a military conflict fought between the Vijayanagara Empire and the Golconda Sultanate in the year 1579 A.D. Yatindra Mahadesikan the seventh Jiyar of the Ahobilam Mutt, accompanied the Vijayanagara commanders Kondaraju Venkataraju and Kondaraju Tirumala Raju and guided them in the expedition. Under his direction, the Vijayanagara army defeated the Golconda army and expelled it from the Ahobilam region. The victory restored Vijayanagara control over the area and allowed the Ahobilam temple to recover from the earlier Golconda Sultanate raid.

== Background ==
The expulsion of the Adil Shahi army in 1576 did not end the threat Deccan Sultanates invasion. In 1579, Ibrahim Qutb Shah Wali broke his recent alliance with Sriranga I and marched into the Vijayanagara Empire with a large army. Ibrahim's invasion was motivated by his desire to collect tribute owed to him by the chiefs Venkatadri, Kasturi Timmaraju, and Narsingh Rao. These chiefs were said to have agreed with Ibrahim's father, Quli Qutb Shah to pay an annual tribute of two lakhs of huns after he captured Kondavidu. However, they had failed to pay the tribute for several years.

Ibrahim Qutb Shah Wali was unable to enforce his claim until 1580, despite having several opportunities to bring the rebellious nobles under his control in the years following the Battle of Talikota. The main cause of the invasion was the political disorder prevailing in the Vijayanagara Empire. Many of the nobles were involved in a feud between the Sari and Matli families and they didn't united to face a Golconda Sultanate threat.

Ibrahim Qutb Shah Wali appears to have received promises of support from some of the Vijayanagara nobles, particularly members of the Hande family, who hoped to advance their family's interests. Seeing an opportunity to expand his territory, he decided to send an expedition into the Vijayanagara dominions and seize as much territory as possible.

The Golkonda army appears to have advanced into the northern districts of the Vijayanagara Empire in two major waves. In 1578–1579, an army commanded by Murari Rao crossed the Krishna River and devastated the eastern taluks of present-day Kurnool district with the assistance of the Hande chiefs Malakappa and Kadambaraya. These chiefs had rebelled against Sriranga I and allied themselves with the Golkonda army.

Murari Rao was a Brahmin by birth and a Maratha by nationality. He rose to great prominence in the service of Ibrahim Qutb Shah Wali and became one of the most powerful figures in the Golkonda Sultanate second only to the ruler himself. Although he was a Hindu by faith, he behaved worse than Muslims during the expedition.

Murari Rao attacked the famous Narasimha shrine at Ahobilam and reportedly seized its gold and silver idols, which were decorated with rubies. He also collected four lakhs of huns from the inhabitants of the region and sent the loot and money to Ibrahim Qutb Shah Wali. An inscription at Ahobilam supports this Incident, stating that Ibrahim Qutb Shah Wali after joining forces with the Hande chiefs plundered the district and sacked the shrine of Ahobalesvara. During the raid, the invaders carried away several gold and silver vessels that had survived the earlier plunder of 1565.

The invasion caused widespread unrest across the region, as villages were plundered and devastated. The conquered territory was subsequently annexed to Golconda Sultanate and placed under the control of the Hande chiefs as a reward for their alliance with the invaders.

== Battle ==
The Hande chiefs were unable to retain control of the conquered territory for long. The Jiyar of the Srivaishnava monastery at Ahobilam, Sri Satagopa Yatindra Mahadesikan, the seventh Jiyar of the Ahobila Mutt, travelled to Penugonda and appeared before Ranga Raya of Vijayanagara. He informed the king about the devastation caused by the Golconda invasion and requested him to reconquer the region and restore Ahobilam to its former glory.

Ranga Raya initially expressed his inability to act against the powerful Golconda Sultanate. However, the Jiyar reminded him of the long-standing association between the Vijayanagara Empire and the Ahobilam temple. The temple had suffered financially after its lands were seized by the invaders and the Jiyar argued that it was the Emperor's duty to restore these lands to the temple.

The Jiyar also urged Ranga Raya to abandon his policy of appeasement and expel the invaders, as his predecessors, including Saluva Narasimha Deva Raya, had done. His appeal persuaded and inspired the king. Ranga Raya subsequently resolved to personally lead an army into the Ahobilam region and drive out the Golkonda forces.

Ranga Raya was inspired by the Jiyar's appeal and offered to personally lead an army against the enemy in the Ahobilam region. The Jiyar told him that his direct intervention was unnecessary and that the expedition could be entrusted to his subordinates, Kondaraju Venkataraju and Kondaraju Tirumala Raju. According to the jiyar the deity of Ahobilam appeared to the Jiyar in a dream and identified the two chiefs as the most suitable commanders for the expedition.

Ranga Raya accepted what was presented as the divine will. He bestowed jewels and titles upon the two chiefs and ordered them to march against the enemy and recover the territory.

The Jiyar accompanied the Vijayanagara commanders and their troops, directing the attack and advising them on the deployment of their forces. The Vijayanagara army defeated the Golkonda army at Ahobilam and cleared the temple area of the invaders. The account states that the army of Ibrahim Qutb Shah Wali was captured during the battle. An inscription at the Ahobilam temple dated to 1584 A.D provides evidence to this event.

== See also ==
- Chandragiri
- Ahmednagar Sultanate
- Bengal Sultanate
