= Kamma (caste) =

Caste from South India

- Religions: Hinduism
- Languages: Telugu
- Country: India
- Region: Andhra Pradesh; Telangana; Tamil Nadu; Karnataka
- Status: Forward caste

Kamma is a largely Hindu caste from South India. The community of Kammas is believed to have originated from agriculturists of the Kammanadu region of the erstwhile Guntur district and Ongole division in Andhra Pradesh. Propelled by their military activity in the Vijayanagara Empire, Kammas are believed to have spread out from the region during the Vijayanagara period, followed by some in-migration during the British period and out-migration again during the twentieth century. Today they are regarded as the richest group in Andhra Pradesh and are a dominant caste from Coastal Andhra with socio-economic and political prominence throughout the Telugu-speaking regions of India (the states of Andhra Pradesh and Telangana).

They also have a notable, albeit smaller, presence in Tamil Nadu and Karnataka. In recent times, a sizeable number of Kammas have migrated to the United States.

== Origins ==
Kammanadu region

The modern community of Kammas is believed to have originated from agriculturists of the Kammanadu region in coastal Andhra Pradesh. The region, lying between the Gundlakamma River and the Krishna River in the erstwhile Guntur district (which included the three subdistricts later transferred to the Ongole district in 1970), had an identity dating back to ancient times.

=== Historical Epigraphy and Evolution ===
The administrative roots of Kammanadu trace back to the Satavahana period, during which the empire was divided into units known as Aharas and Rashtras. The lower Krishna valley, encompassing modern day Guntur and Prakasam, was organised as a Rashtra, a framework later inherited by the Ikshvakus and Pallavas. Historically, the agricultural wealth of this district is noted for fuelling the construction of the Amaravati Stupa, with the region eventually becoming known as Karma rashtra.

The identity of the Kammanadu region is well attested through a series of historical grants spanning over a millennium. The region was originally known in Sanskrit as Karma-rashtra, first appearing in 3rd-century Ikshvaku inscriptions at Jaggayyapeta. This was followed by the Mayidavolu Grant (c. early 4th century AD), issued by the Pallava prince Sivaskandavarman from Kanchipuram to his officials in Dhanyakataka (Amaravati). This grant is significant for establishing early Pallava sovereignty over the Guntur region, which they referred to at the time as Andhrapata.

Shortly thereafter, the Mattepad Grant of King Damodaravarman (Ananda Gotrikas dynasty) referred to the area as Kammaka-rattha, a Prakrit variation. Under the Pallava dynasty, the region's administrative status was solidified through charters such as the Chendalur Grant of Kumara Vishnu II and the Omgodu Grant of Vijaya Skandavarman II, both of which describe the Guntur-Ongole territory as Karmma-rashtra. Following the 7th century, under the influence of the Eastern Chalukyas and later the Telugu Chodas, the Sanskrit name transitioned into the local Telugu form, Kammanadu. This transition is finalised in 12th-century records, such as the Konidena inscriptions, which formally identify the region as Kammanadu with its capital at Katyadona (modern Konidena).

=== Etymology and Migration ===
The term "kamma" either referred to the two rivers that formed the boundaries of the region, or to the Buddhist monastic institutions called sanghakammas believed to have been once prevalent in the region.

As the people of the region migrated to other parts, they were often referred to as the Kamma community (kamma-kula). Terms such as kamma-brahmana, kamma-komati, kamma-sreshti and kamma-kapu are attested in inscriptions as descriptions of people. The migration was apparently quite extensive, and was made by possible by the Kammanadu's strategic location with access to the Deccan Plateau as well as to the regions in the south and southwest. By 1872, only one-fourth of their total population was living in the original region. But the migrants retained links to the homeland and returned to it whenever the situation was favourable.

== Medieval history ==
=== Post-Kakatiya period ===
The tradition holds that the Kammas, along with Velamas and Reddis, evolved out of the community of Kapus (cultivators) in the post-Kakatiya period. A popular legend collected by Edgar Thurston narrates that Kammas originated from the youngest son of a certain Belthi Reddi, who managed to recover his mother's ear-ornament (called "kamma" in Telugu) that had been appropriated by Emperor Prataparudra's minister. The other sons of Belthi Reddi are similarly said to have given rise to the other prominent caste communities of the Telugu people.

=== Vijayanagara period ===
Kammas served as ministers, military generals, and governors in the Vijayanagara Empire. During the reign of Krishnadevaraya, Kammas are said to have formed the bulwark of the Vijayanagara army. Their role in protecting the last great Hindu kingdom of India was significant. Krishnadevaraya's court had a significant presence of Kamma officers, and they entered into matrimonial alliances with the royal family. It's possible that the influence of Kamma generals led to the importance of the Telugu language in Vijayanagara and the rise of Telugu colonies in Tamil Nadu. Some of the notable Kamma Nayak clans of Vijayanagara include the Pemmasanis, Sayapanenis, and Ravellas.

Of the Pemmasani Nayaks, they controlled parts of Rayalaseema and had large mercenary armies that were the vanguard of the Vijayanagara Empire in the sixteenth century. Pemmasani Ramalinga Nayudu was a leading military commander under Krishnadevaraya, and Rama Raya and the Aravidus rose to power following a civil war largely because of the support of Pemmasani Erra Timmanayudu. Pemmasani Pedda Timmaraja was the minister of Sriranga I and later for Venkata II, the latter of whom oversaw the revival of the Vijayanagara Empire. It is also known that a Pemmasani Nayak, Timmanayudu, had court poets and ministers of his own, such as Channamaraju. Pemmasani Timmanayudu also assisted Venkata II in putting down a rebellion by the Nandyala Chiefs led by Krishnamaraja in 1580. The Pemmasani Nayaks are associated with Gandikota, where they started as commandants and later gained control of Gandikota Seema from the Nandyala Chiefs. Numerous Hindu temples, such as Bugga Ramalingeshwara Swamy Temple and Chintalarayaswamy Temple, were constructed and patronized by the Pemmasanis.

The Sayapaneni Nayaks started in service of Vijayanagara when Krishnadevaraya granted administrative control of the Dupadu Region to Shayappanayadu, a twenty-year old from the family. According to the Dupati kaifiyat, this area was consolidated by Vengala Nayudu and Venkatadri Nayudu, who are Shayappa Nayudu's descendants, and their rule is presented as a peaceful epoch. Although modest actors in the Deccan, their main strength lay in their ability to shift allegiances, facilitated by Niyogi Brahmins, as seen with their initial allegiance to the Vijayanagara Empire and later to the Qutb Shahis and the Nizams after Vijayanagara's demise.

The Ravella Nayaks were another prominent clan that served the Vijayanagara Empire militarily and administratively since the Sangama Dynasty, and they exercised control (on behalf of Vijayanagara) over Srisailam, Udayagiri, Podili, and Kochcherlakota Seemas (regions) at various periods. The exploits of this clan are described by the poet Ratnakaram Gopala Kavi in Sovgandhika Prasavapaharanamu, including mentions of defeating the Qutb Shahis, Gajapatis, and recapturing forts like Adoni. Noted individuals in the Ravella Nayaks include Ravella Linga II, who is surmised to be one of the chief generals of the Vijayanagara Army during the reign of Rama Raya.

When the Vijayanagara Empire was troubled after the Battle of Tallikota in 1565, the Pemmasani Nayaks, Ravella Nayaks and Sayapaneni Nayaks helped the Aravidu Dynasty in keeping the Muslims at bay. It took another 90 years to consolidate the Muslim power in Andhra country with the capture of Gandikota in 1652 and the defeat of Pemmasani Timmanayudu by Mir Jumla. Following the Battle of Talikota, many Kamma Nayaks either migrated to the dominions of the Madurai and Thanjavur Nayaks where they governed villages and supplied military officers or obtained favours from the Qutb Shahis and Mughals and settled in Telugu regions as local military chiefs.

=== Qutb Shahi and Nizam period ===
Kammas were also in service of the Qutb Shahis. Their roles included serving as the regional aristocracy, revenue officers and military commanders. During the reign of the Qutb Shahis and Nizams, the Sayapaneni Nayaks (1626–1802) ruled a block of territory between the Krishna River and Nellore as vassals. It was also in the Qutb Shahi period that the Vasireddy clan of Vasireddy Venkatadri Nayudu received the deshmukhi of the Nandigama pargana in 1670. Vasireddy Venkatadri Nayudu, a Kamma zamindar, controlled 551 towns and villages in the Guntur and Krishna Districts, had a retinue of several thousand men, and became known for his patronization of Hindu religious rituals, festivals, temples, and Brahmins. The Kamma Yarlagadda zamindars of Challapalli obtained their zamindari in 1596 and deshmukhi jurisdiction in 1640, and they assisted the Muslim rulers in their military expeditions and collection of land taxes. This conferred on the Yarlagaddas the privileges of maintaining their own military force and control over the inhabitants in their area.

Following Mughal Emperor Aurangzeb's reign, coastal Andhra witnessed a series of widespread rebellions against the local Mughal officials that enabled Kamma warrior chiefs to usurp administrative power over hundreds, if not thousands, of square miles of land. In the 1600–1800s, Kammas acquired land in the interior Deccan Plateau due to grants that were given by the Nizam of Hyderabad to encourage cultivation in uncultivated areas of Telangana. Moreover, in the Telangana region, Muslim rulers collected taxes through intermediaries from the dominant castes, such as the Kammas, who were given the title Chowdary.

=== British period ===
Although the 1802 Permanent Settlement by the British benefited the Kamma landed aristocracy by reinforcing the Zamindari system, most Kammas saw their landholdings consolidated, and their influence consequently increased, by the introduction of the ryotwari system as a replacement for the zamindari system in the 19th century. Akin to the jenmis of Kerala, there were also big Kamma ryotwari landlords in Andhra. Some Kammas also were in the Madras Army of the British East India Company. Among Telugu Hindus, the East India Company army initially recruited predominantly from the Kamma, Raju, and Velama castes and restricted recruitment from other castes.

In the 1872 census, the Kammas made up 40 per cent of the agricultural population of the Krishna district (which included the present Guntur district until 1904). Along with Brahmins, they formed the dominant community of the district. By 1921, their population in the district increased to 47 per cent, representing a large in-migration. Following Brahminical traditions, Kammas emulated the rituals of the Brahmins, and the literate Kammas learned the Vedas, wore the sacred threads, taught Sanskrit and even performed pujas for the lower-caste members, which is said to have generated controversies. Despite their attachment to Brahminical orthodoxy, the Kammas also related to the Kapus in a narrative. Kammas formed the Kamma Mahajana Sabha, a caste association, in 1910, which received encouragement from the political leaders. Ranga also started a Madras Kamma Association in 1919 and founded a journal Kamma Patrika, later renamed to Ryot Patrika. Kamma caste associations also spawned in Tamil Nadu in the 1920s, with two Kamma zamindars leading the Kamma Mahajana Sabha and the Dakshina Desa Kamma Mahasabha. Kammas constituted 6 per cent of the population in the Telugu-speaking areas of the Madras Presidency in 1921, a figure slightly higher than Brahmins, but lagging far behind the 'Kapu or Reddi'.

Construction of dams and barrages and establishment of an irrigation system in Godavari and Krishna River deltas by Arthur Cotton was a great boon to the Kamma farmers. Availability of water and the natural propensity for hard work made the Kammas wealthy and prosperous. The money was put to good use by establishing numerous schools and libraries and encouraging their children to take up modern education. In 1921, Kammas had the highest literacy rate among other dominant castes, such as Reddis and Kapus, though it was lower than Brahmins. The money was also invested into various companies, industries, such as food processing and transportation, and moneylending. The Kammas of Tamil Nadu, who speak Telugu at home, have also excelled in the cultivation of black cotton soils and later diversified into various industrial enterprises, particularly in Coimbatore and Kovilpatti. Coimbatore was known as the 'Manchester of South India' and its textile industry, which is the main economic sector in the city, is almost entirely controlled by affluent Kamma families that were the landed aristocracy of Kongu Nadu.

By the mid 20th century, many Kammas had benefited greatly from the numerous educational institutes that had proliferated throughout Coastal Andhra such as Andhra Christian College or Guntur Medical College. Many of these were high-fee private educational institutes also formed by wealthy members of the dominant castes who often gave preference to students from their community in admissions.

=== Today ===
Today they are regarded as the wealthiest group in Andhra Pradesh and an entrepreneurial community influential in various industries, such as information technology, real estate, media and Telugu cinema. They are a dominant caste from Coastal Andhra with socio-economic and political prominence throughout the Telugu-speaking regions of India (the states of Andhra Pradesh and Telangana). In united-Andhra Pradesh (including present-day Andhra Pradesh and Telangana), Kammas made up 4.8% of the total state population in the last census. Kammas also have a notable, albeit smaller, presence in Tamil Nadu and Karnataka.

==== Migration to US ====
In recent times, a sizeable number of Kammas have migrated to the United States. Starting in the 1950s, some members of the dominant castes from Andhra Pradesh had gone to the US for higher education. After the lifting of immigration quota system in 1965, the highly educated doctors, engineers and scientists started moving to US. Kammas, mainly from well-off families and having benefited from the spread of educational institutions in Coastal Andhra, took up the opportunity to move. After the IT boom in the 1990s, even more migrated to America. The success of those who migrated already incentivized more of their relatives and members of their network to migrate as well, and today having an "NRI child" is seen as a matter of pride for Kamma parents in coastal Andhra. For Kamma and other dominant caste women, although some have been sent by families for higher studies in America, many have moved to America due to marriage with NRI men.

== Classification ==
Classification of social groups in the Andhra region has changed frequently as the various communities jostle for status. During the British Raj, the Kammas were considered to be "upper Shudra"/"Sat Shudra", along with the Reddy and Velama castes, under the varna system.

Selig Harrison said in 1956 that

Kamma lore nurtures the image of a once-proud warrior clan reduced by Reddi chicanery to its present peasant status. Reddi duplicity, recounted by Kamma historian K. Bhavaiah Choudary, was first apparent in 1323 AD at the downfall of Andhra's Kakatiya dynasty. Reciting voluminous records to prove that Kammas dominated the Kakatiya court, Chaudary suggests that the Reddis, also influential militarists at the time, struck a deal at Kamma expense with the Moslem conquerors of the Kakatiya regime. The Kammas lost their noble rank and were forced into farming.

== Politics ==
Prior to the bifurcation of Andhra Pradesh, creating the new state of Telangana, the Kammas and the Reddys were politically and economically dominant in the state. From 1953 to 1983, many Kammas initially associated themselves with the Indian National Congress and offered the party financing and media support. During the 1980s, they played a key role in state and national politics with the inception of the Telugu Desam Party by its then President N. T. Rama Rao also called as NTR.

== Dynasties ==
- Musunuri Nayakas
- Pemmasani Nayaks
- Ravella Nayaks
- Sayapaneni Nayaks

== Notable people ==
=== Politics ===
- M. Venkaiah Naidu, former Vice President of India
- N. T. Rama Rao, former Chief Minister of Andhra Pradesh
- Nara Chandrababu Naidu, Chief Minister of Andhra Pradesh

=== Industry ===
- Cherukuri Ramoji Rao
- Mullapudi Harishchandra Prasad
- Galla Ramachandra Naidu
- Galla Jayadev
- Murali Divi
- Velagapudi Ramakrishna ICS, Founder-KCP group; First ICS officer and Industrialist from the community

=== Sciences ===
- G. D. Naidu, inventor

=== Sports ===
- Koneru Humpy
- Pullela Gopichand

=== Film ===
- Akkineni Nageswara Rao
- Akkineni Nagarjuna
- Akkineni Naga Chaitanya
- Ghattamaneni Krishna
- Ghattamaneni Mahesh Babu
- Ghanta Naveen Babu (Nani)
- K. Raghavendra Rao
- L. V. Prasad
- Nandamuri Taraka Rama Rao
- Nandamuri Balakrishna
- N. T. Rama Rao Jr.
- Prasad Devineni
- Shobu Yarlagadda
- Sobhan Babu
- S. S. Rajamouli
- K. Bhagyaraj

== Bibliography ==
- Benbabaali, Dalel (2018), "Caste Dominance and Territory in South India: Understanding Kammas' socio-spatial mobility", Modern Asian Studies, 52 (6): 1938–1976, doi:10.1017/S0026749X16000755, ISSN 0026-749X, S2CID 150042014
- Frykenberg, Robert Eric (2011), "Elite Groups in a South Indian District: 1788–1858", The Journal of Asian Studies, 24 (2): 261–281, doi:10.2307/2050565, ISSN 0021-9118, JSTOR 2050565, S2CID 153984852
- Hanumantha Rao, B. S. L. (1995). Socio-cultural history of ancient and medieval Andhra. Hyderabad: Telugu University. ISBN 9788186073087.
- Harrison, Selig S. (June 1956). "Caste and the Andhra Communists". The American Political Science Review. 50 (2): 378–404. doi:10.2307/1951675. JSTOR 1951675. S2CID 147317455.
- Keiko, Yamada (2008), "Politics and representation of caste identity in regional historiography: A case study of Kammas in Andhra", The Indian Economic and Social History Review, 45 (3): 353–380, doi:10.1177/001946460804500302, S2CID 145663799
