= Ravella Linga II =

Military General Raja of Ravella Nayaks
- Monarch: Sadasiva Raya

Personal details
- Parent: Ravella Tippa (father)

Military service
- Allegiance: Vijayanagara Empire
- Battles/wars: Siege of Adoni; Siege of Penugonda; Siege of Gandikota; Siege of Kurnool

Ravella Linga II was a military commander of the Vijayanagara Empire and a member of the Ravella Nayaks family. He served under the regent Rama Raya in the mid-16th century. The Sougandhika-prasavapaharanamu written by Gopala Kavi credits him with capturing the fort of Adoni and driving enemy forces from Penugonda while the Vasucharitramu and Ramarajiyamu mention these conquests during Rama Raya's campaigns. Linga II is described as one of the leading commanders of the Vijayanagara army during Rama Raya's regency.

== Origins ==
Ravella Linga II was the son of Ravella Tippa and his wife Peddamma. He was a member of the Ravella Nayaks family, a Telugu military clan that served the emperors of the Vijayanagara Empire.

== Military career ==
Ravella Linga II accompanied Rama Raya the regent of the Vijayanagara Empire during his military campaigns. he earned the admiration of Rama Raya's brother Venkatadri for his military service. He is credited with capturing the fort of Adoni and driving enemy forces out of Penugonda.

Ravella Linga II is associated with Vijayanagara's campaigns against Deccan Sultanates along the empire's northern frontier during Rama Raya's regency. Several historical works portray him as one of the empire's prominent military commanders. The Vasucharitramu and Ramarajiyamu record that Rama Raya captured the forts of Penugonda, Gandikota, Kurnool, and Adoni campaigns in which Ravella Linga II is said to have taken part.

== Family ==
Ravella Linga II and his wife Siddhamma had two sons Ravella Konda and Ravella Ayyappa.

== See also ==
- Rama Raya
- Deccan Sultanates
- Sayapaneni Nayaks
