= History of Pulicat =

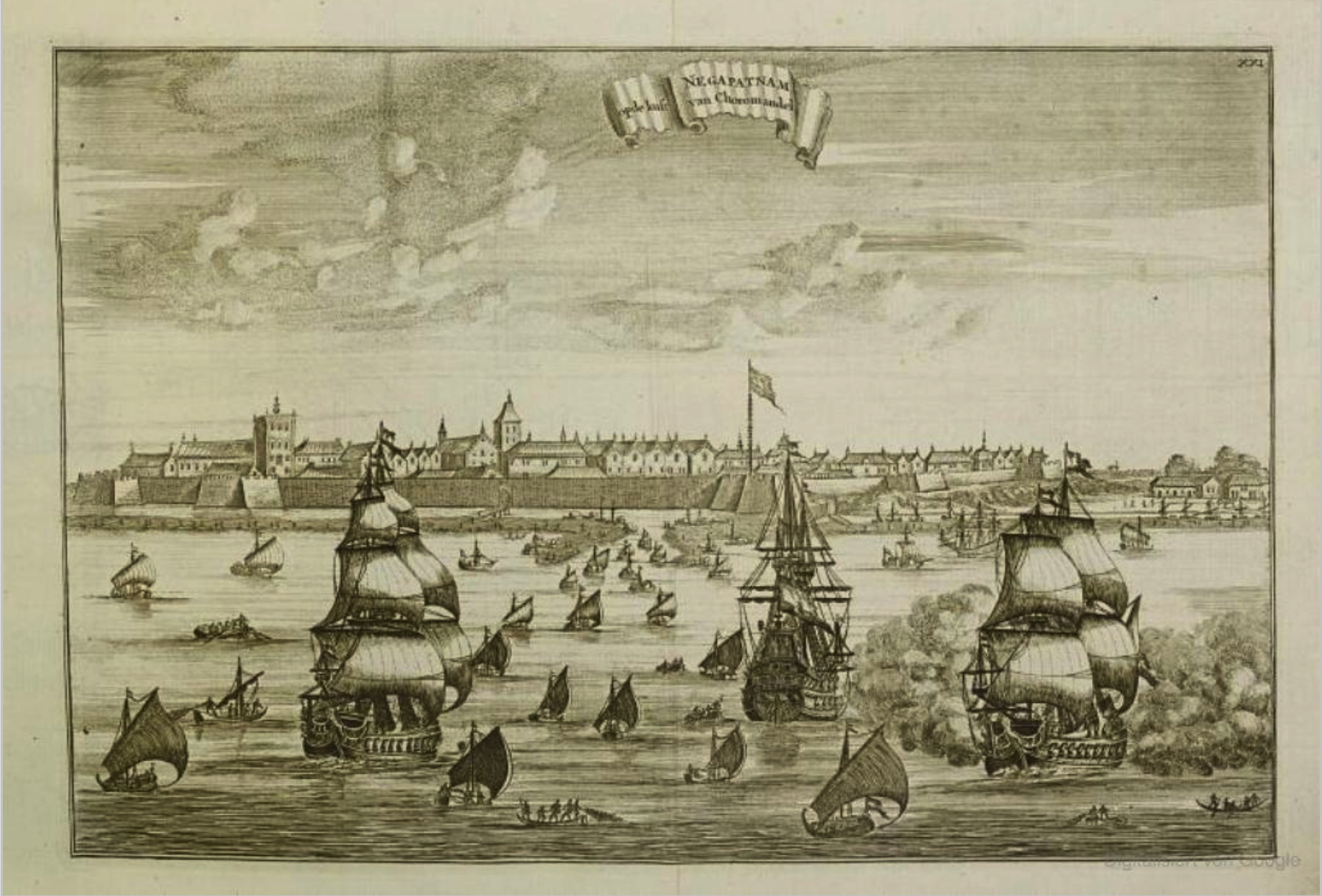
Dutch trading ships on the Coromandel Coast Circa 1680

The History of Pulicat revolves around the early role of Pulicat as a seaport in one of the few natural harbours on the Coromandel Coast of South India. Pulicat is in Tamil Nadu at the mouth of Pulicat lake. Worth a visit to AARDE Pulicat Museum located in Kottai Kuppam road at Pazhaverkadu will give the detailed account on the history of Pulicat.

== Summary ==
Described as a grand port, starting with early 300 BCE history till the 15th century, Pulicat figured prominently as Tamil, Telugu and Muslim rulers fought to garner benefits from rich port revenues. Thereafter, some Arabs and Portuguese, followed by the Dutch and the British dominated the port till 1825. In the early 16th century, it had a multi-cultural population exceeding 50,000 and was the most important Indian port on the Bay of Bengal. Later, it was a fishing village and a health resort under British rule.

In the 17th century, Dutch agents in Pulicat operated a large Slave trade along the Coromandel Coast. Between 1621 and 1665 alone, over 38,000 slaves were shipped from central Coromandel ports, including Pulicat, Madras, Nagapatnam and Devanampatnam.

The history of Pulicat is traced to eight periods of Indian kings and foreign colonialists between the 3rd century BCE and the present post independence period.

| Period | Kingdoms/Rulers |
|---|---|
| 3rd century BCE to 3rd century CE | Ancient Tamil kingdoms |
| 3rd to 10th century | The Pallava Period & first Arab settlement in the 9th century |
| 10th to 12th century | The Chola Period |
| 13th to 17th century | Vijayanagara Empire & Arab migrants |
| 1502 to 1606 | Vijayanagara Empire & Portuguese outpost |
| 1606 to 1825 | Dutch East India Company Trading center & Vijayanagara Empire |
| 1825 to 1947 | British Raj outpost |
| Post independence Period | Republic of India, fishing village |

== Early history (300 BCE – 1279 CE) ==
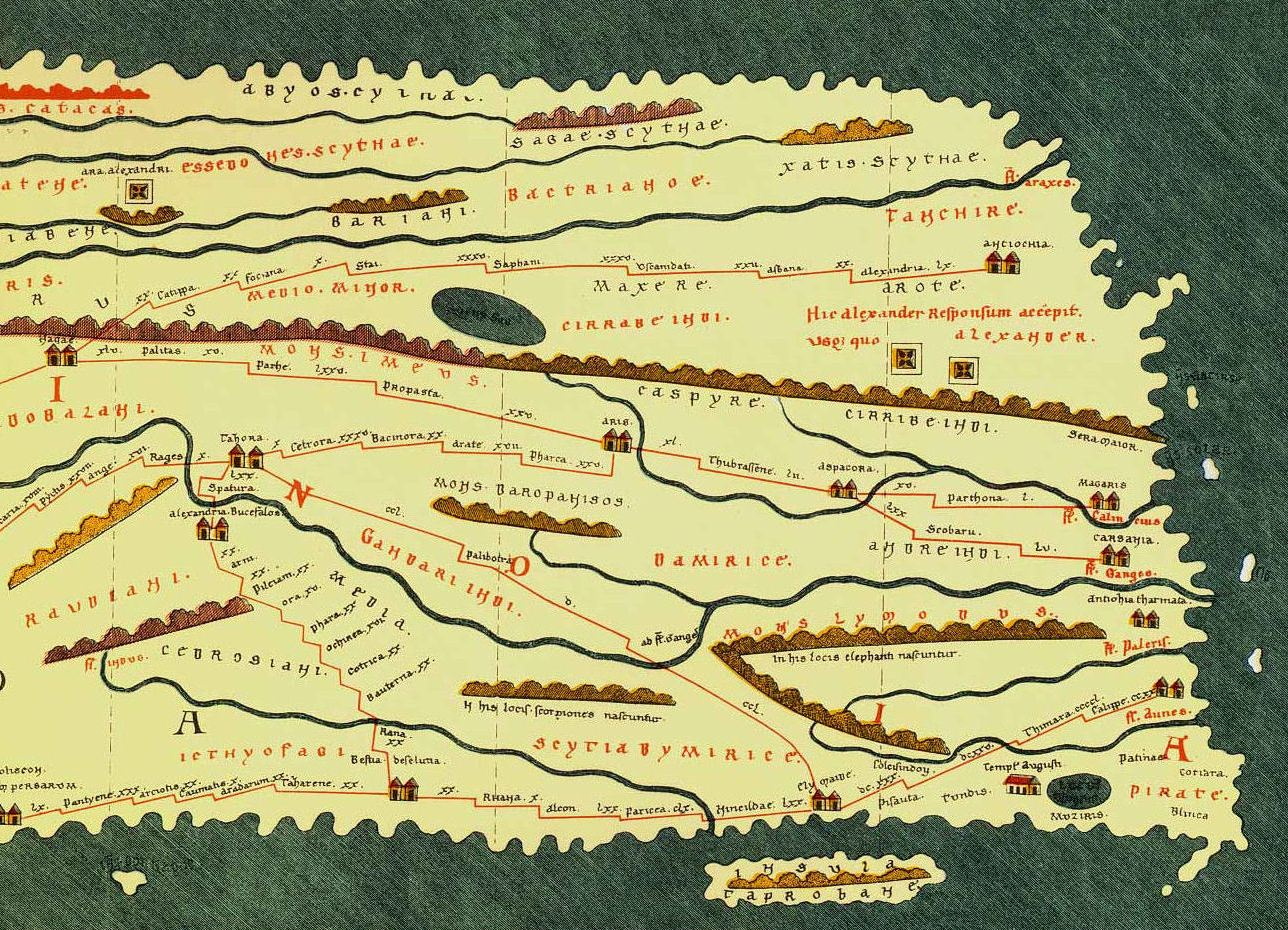
c. 250 CE map of South India following cartography of Ptolemy shows Tabrobane (Sri Lanka), at the bottom, Muziris (Musiri town), R. dunes (Kaveri river) below R. Palerif (Palar river) and the R. Ganges (Ganges river).

=== Ancient Tamil Kingdoms ===
From the 3rd century BCE to the 3rd century XE, Pulicat was a northern outpost of the Ancient Tamil kingdoms of the Early Cholas, the Early Pandyan Kingdom and the Sangam Cheras. In the 1st century, the anonymous mariner who wrote Periplus of the Erythraean Sea listed Podouke (Pulicat) as one of the three ports on the east coast of India. In the 2nd century, Ptolomey's list of ports on this coast included Podouke emporion.

=== Pallava and Chola periods ===
In the 3rd century, Pulicat came under the power of the Pallava kings to the north. In the 7th century, during the Pallava period, Pulicat was named Mamalla Pattinam indicating it was an important coastal city worthy enough to carry the coronation title of a King. In the 11th century, during the Golden Era of the Medieval Cholas an important Shiva Temple was built by Rajendra Chola on the Arani River, 4 kilometres (2.5 mi) southwest of the lake at Tirupalaivanam near Pulicat.

=== Arab migrants ===
In the 9th century, Pulicat contained settlements of Arab maritime traders. In the 13th century, A.H. 668 (1269 CE), Arabic Suni-Shafi Khadems from Medina migrated to the shores of this lake after they were banished from Mecca for refusing to pay tributes to a new Caliph. They adopted the Tamil language and became leading traders in the area. From 1225 to 1275, Arab ships transporting tin from Malaya to Die, Oman or Dhufar regularly stopped at Pulicat. In the 12th and 13th century, as a result of their trade links with Arabian Peninsula and Indian Ocean ports, Pulicat and other Coromandal port towns came to be identified as centers of formal Islam in South India. A significant number of their Tamil speaking community were classed as "permanent professing Muslims". In the early 16th century, a Muslim named Cajole was the Port Captain of Pulicat. Streets with dilapidated masonry houses, once occupied by these Arabian Muslims, are still found in the area. Some remaining resident families claim records in Arabic testifying their migration to this area.

== Vijayanagara Empire (1336–1646) ==
In 1336, at the beginning of the Vijayanagara Empire, during the reign of the early Sangama Dynasty kings Harihara Raya I and Bukka Raya I, the area now called Pulicat was known as Pralaya Kaveri. In 1422, at the beginning of the reign of Deva Raya II this port city was renamed Anandarayan Pattinam after the new governor Anandaraya. This name was retained till 1521, when it was changed to Palaverkadu during the reign of Krishnadevaraya.

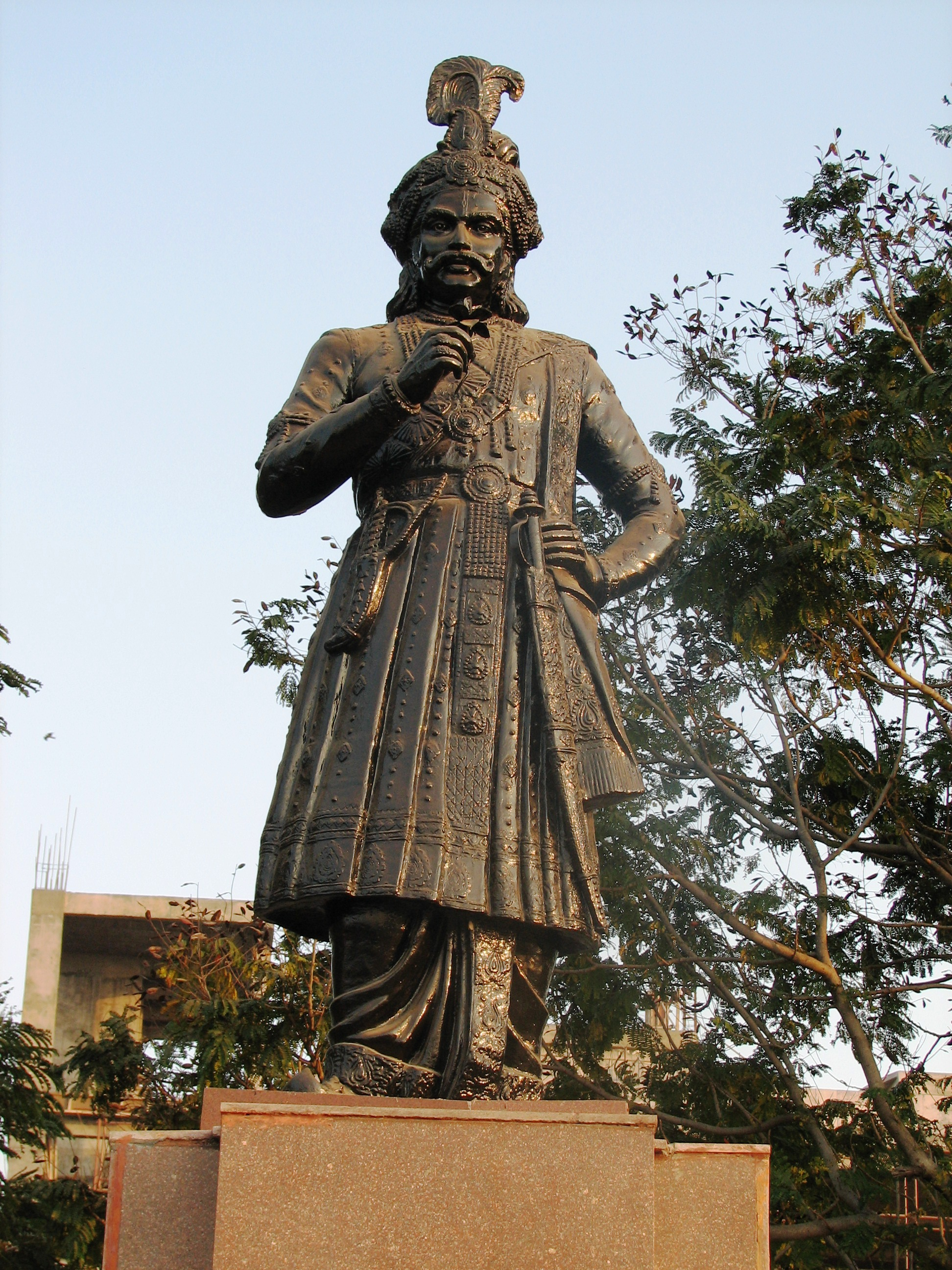
Krishnadevaraya ruled Pulicat 1509–1529

In the 15th and early 16th century, Pulicat rose to importance due to stabilization of the Vijayanagar empire and firm links, including a road, to the great imperial capital of Vijayanagara. In this period, Pulicat was the most important port in southeast India. It was a well-developed trading center thought to have a population exceeding 50,000. The Coromandal coast was a major producer of textiles and yarns for export to Melaka and Burma, and Anandarayan Pattinam was the port from which they were shipped. During this period, in Pulicat there was also a great industry for cutting and polishing precious stones as diamonds, sapphires and rubies procured from the Deccan, Ceylon and Pegu (Burma).

In 1505, Pulicat was stated to be the most active and richest port on the Coromandel Coast.From here there was a barter trade which included exchange of local colored cotton goods for precious rubies from Burma and elephants from Ceylon.The Pulicat Governor, appointed by the Raja of Vijayanagar, collected duties on these transactions. In 1532, it was recorded that property tax was levied in Pulicat on a graded scale and sales tax was levied on rice and paddy, oil and ghee, jaggery, pepper, turmeric, betal nut, gallnut, sugar, cumin, fenugreek, dry ginger and textiles. Import taxes on commodities and export taxes on cloth and corn were also levied.

After the 1556, Battle of Talikota resulted in a decline of the Vijayanagar Empire, Ibrahim Quli Qutub Shah Wali, the third ruler of the Kingdom of Golkonda took control of Palaverkadu. In 1570, the new king Tirumala Deva Raya divided the kingdom and allowed Sriranga Deva Raya to rule the area. Palaverkadu was renamed as Prelaya Kaveri.

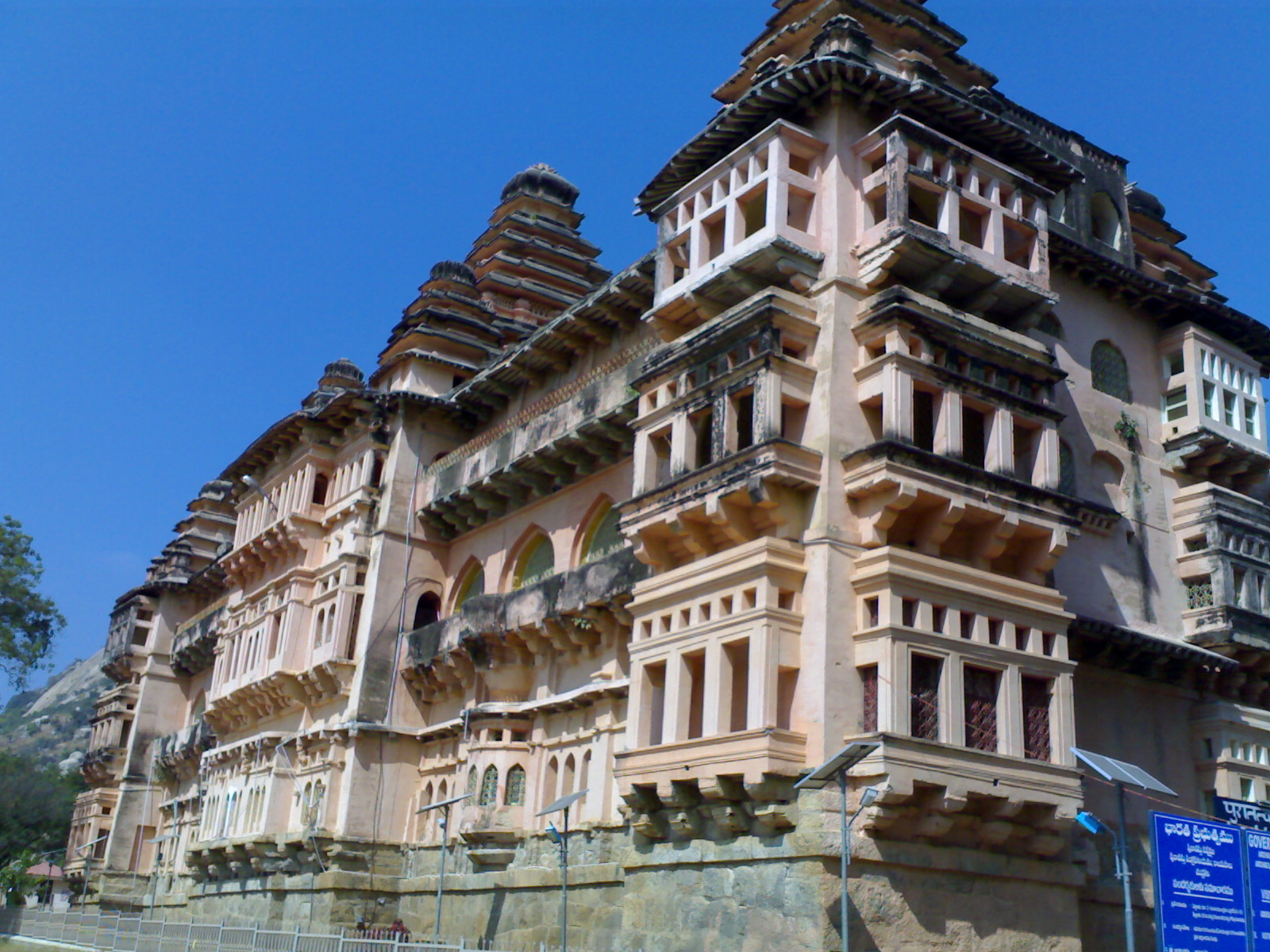
The Chandragiri Fort from where Venkatapati Deva Raya reigned and his wife Oboyoma ruled Pulicat

In 1586, Oboyoma, the favorite queen of Venkatapati Deva Raya, the Vijayanagaar emperor, now operating from the new capital at Chandragiri, was bequeathed Pulicat to rule. She gave aid to Portuguese Jesuits to build a residence at Pulicat.

After the death of Venkatapati Deva Raya in 1614 and a succession struggle, his son Ramadeva became king in 1617 and named his father in-law Ethiraja as master of Pulicat. At the time of his death, the King had no less than three large chests full of diamonds in his possession. In 1616, the Madurai Nayak ruler Muttu Virappa paid a tribute of 600,000 Pagodas to Venkatapati Deva Raya at Chandragiri.

== European trading outpost (1502–1825) ==
=== Portuguese trading outpost ===
In 1502, the Portuguese traders established a trading outpost here during the rule of Krishnadeva Raya and soon dominated the port until 1560. These private merchants were out of reach of the official authority in Goa and some were viewed as renegades, bandits and pirates. In 1515, they built a church dedicated to Nossa Senhora dos Prazeres (Our Lady of Joys) which was renamed to Our Lady of Glory. It is the oldest church in the present Madras-Mylapore Diocese and is still used, but in poor condition.

In 1520, there were 200 – 300 Portuguese inhabitants in Palaverkadu. By 1545, there were 600 – 700 families and from 1565 their population was in decline. By 1600, Pulicat had only two or three thousand residents.

=== Dutch trading center ===
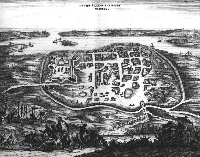
Aerial view of Pellacata Circa. 1656

In 1606, a Dutch ship stopped on the shores of the Karimanal Village, north of the mouth of the lake requesting water. Local Muslims offered food and help to the Dutch. They struck a trade partnership to procure and supply local merchandise to the Dutch for trade in the East Indies.

Queen Eraivi, a wife of King Venkata II, ruled Prelaya Kaveri and during her reign in 1608 the Dutch East India Company (Verenigde Oostindische Compagnie or (VOC), was given permission to build a fort and do trading. They built a fort named Geldria at Pulicat as a defense from local kings and the Portuguese, from where they soon monopolized the lucrative textiles trade with the East Indies and other countries in the region. Under pressure from the Dutch, an English trading post established in 1619 was disbanded in 1622. The Dutch establishment here met with early stiff resistance from the Portuguese, including several attacks on the harbor. In 1611, Venkatatapati turned against the Portuguese and the Jesuits were ordered to leave Chandragiri and the Dutch were permitted to build a fort at Pulicat.

In 1614, subsequent to the death of Venkatapati and taking advantage of a predicament in naming his successor, the Portuguese attacked the Dutch at Pulicat. In 1623, the Portuguese attacked the harbor and burned two ships. In 1633, the Portuguese again attacked the Dutch at Pulicat with a promise of land support from the Vijayanagar ruler which never materialized. After the Portuguese had withdrawn their fleet, the Vijayanagara King (Sri Ranga) residing at Ratnagiri then attacked the Dutch at Pulicat but was paid a handsome tribute by the Dutch. Thereafter, the Dutch were not troubled.

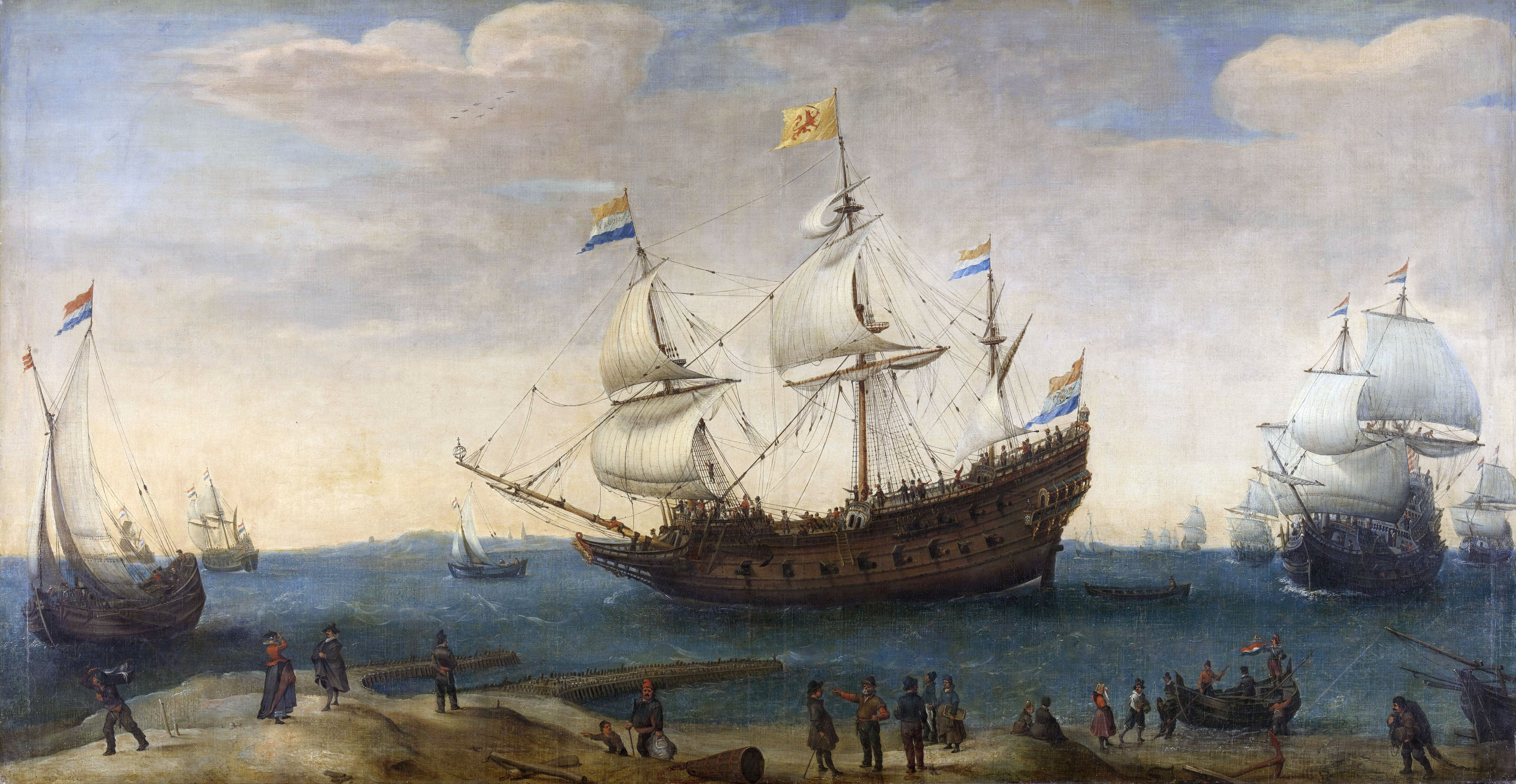
Dutch East-India trading ship 1600

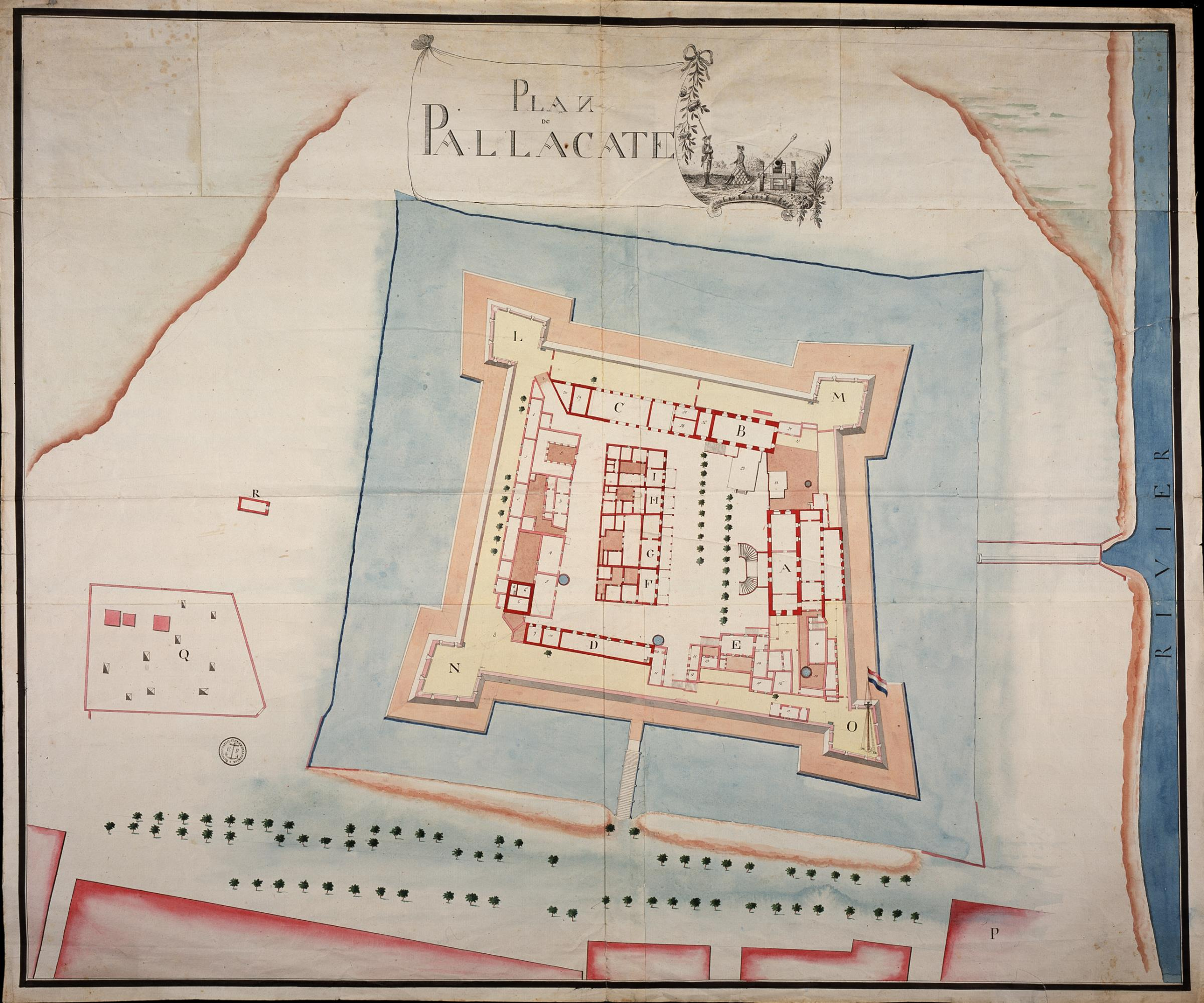
Map of the fort at Paliacatte

During the Dutch occupation Pulicat was known by the name Pallaicatta From 1616 to 1690, Pulicat was the official headquarters of Dutch Coromandel. It then shifted to Negapatnam but with ceding of Negapatnam to the British in 1784, the headquarters shifted back to Pulicat. The VOC was established to protect Dutch trade in the East Indies and fight their enemies from Europe who wished to enter east India trade. They held power for 200 years as the largest trading company. The trading involved spices including nutmeg, cloves, cinnamon, pepper, and tea, silk and Chinese porcelain.

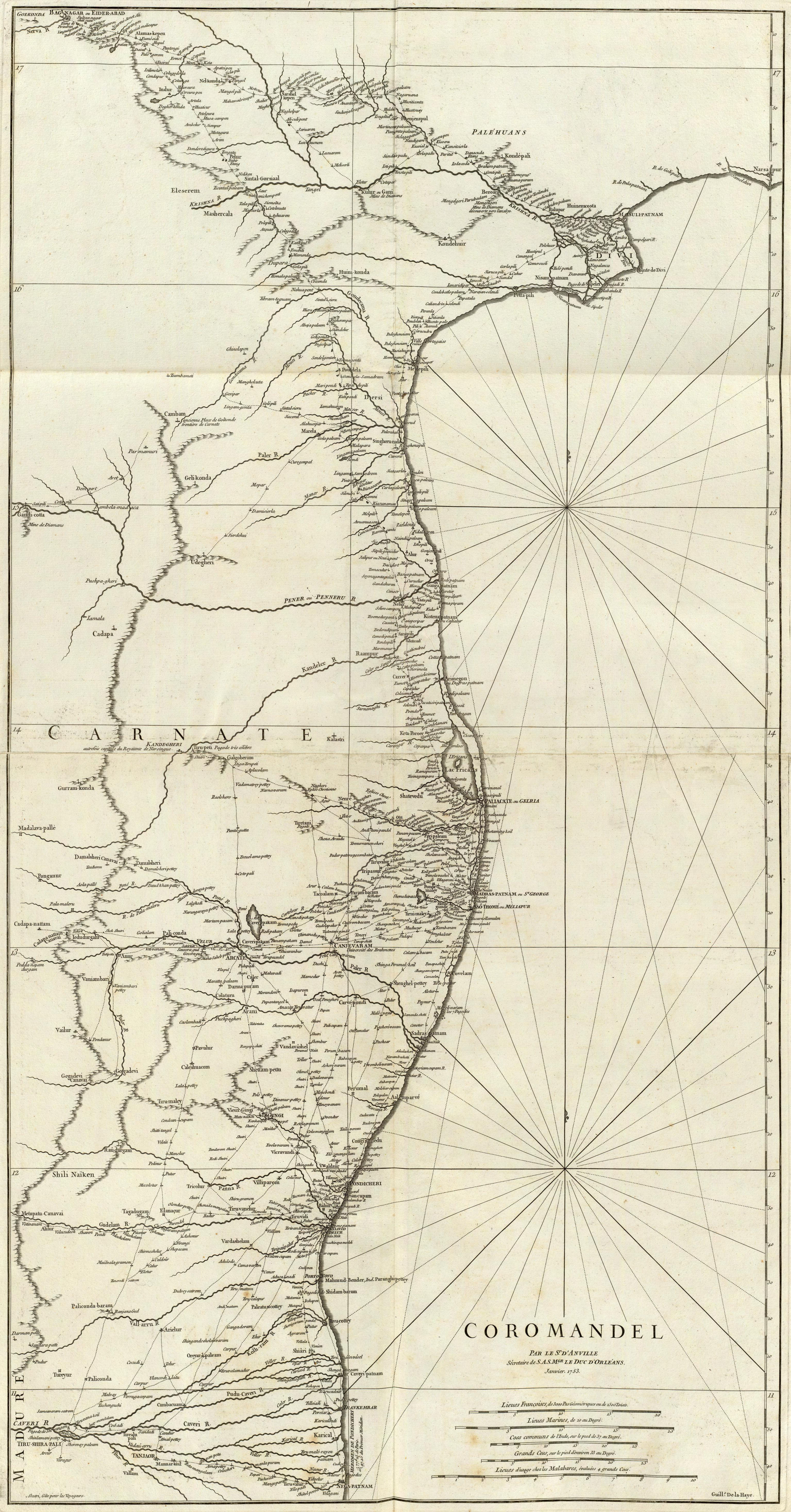
Coromandel coast showing Paliacate and the Buckingham Canal in 1753

Manufacture of cloth for export was the sole occupation of several indigenous groups in Pulicat and the hinterlands of Tamil, Telugu and Kannada territories, and it is likely that over 1,000 handlooms operated in Pulicat alone. In the 1620s, the Dutch East India Company established a gunpowder factory in Pulicat. Its output was so substantial that for several decades it was able to keep many of the major Dutch trading centers in the East Indies and homeward-bound fleets well supplied. In 1615, the first VOC mint in India was established in Fort Gelria where, initially, "Kas" copper coins with VOC monogram and a Sanskrit legend were minted. The Pulicat mint operated till 1674, when a new mint was established at Negapatanam. These coins were widely used in Ceylon.

Dutch's dominance in the coasts of India during the 16th century was partly attributed to the Hindu ruler, Zamorin. Zamorin welcomed the Portuguese and in turn prospered from the trade from the entry point ports he commanded.

Among the many trading voyages that departed from Pulicat, in 1658 the Dutch trading ship Avondster (captured as the Blessing from the British in 1653 and renamed) transported money and valuable cargo from Pulicat to Bengal.

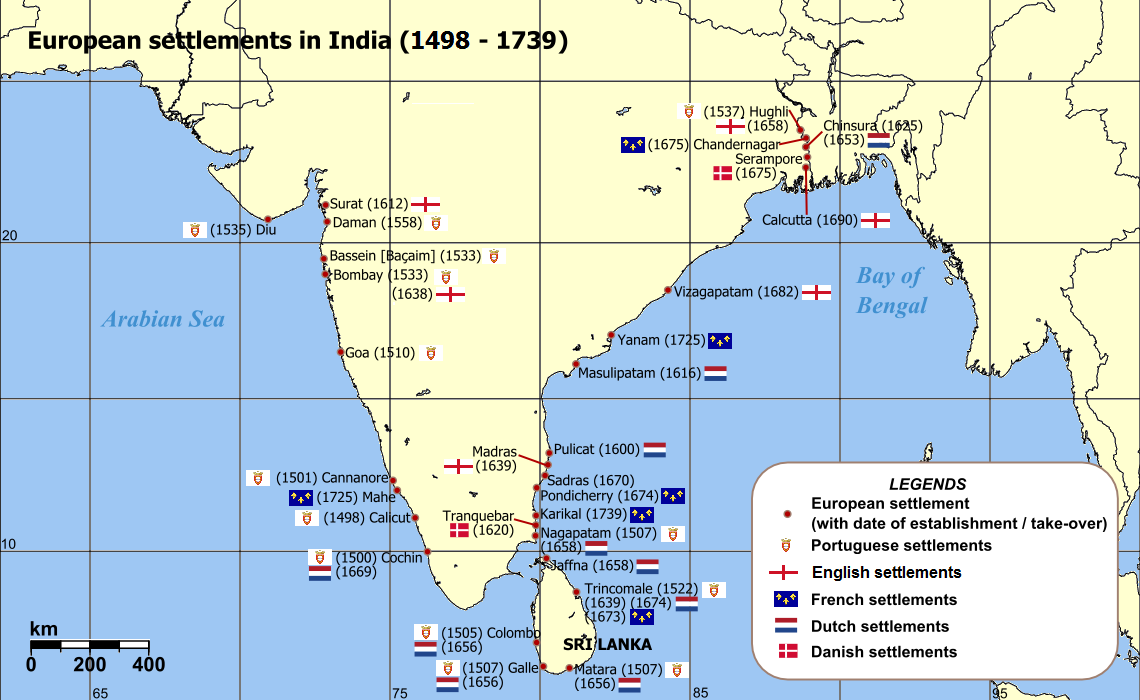
Dutch settlements shown at Masulipatnam, Pulicat, Negapatnam and Cochin

By the early 17th century, Pallaicatta's population has been estimated to have declined to just over 10,000. In 1746, the monsoon failed, resulting in a devastating famine. In the larger towns of Pulicat and Santhome alone the death toll was put at 15,000 and only one third of the textile weavers, painters and washers survived. Cloth prices increased 15% and little was available even at that price. An even more significant cause of the Dutch decline was conquest of the area by the Golconda forces commanded by Mir Jumla. Except for two short breaks, Dutch rule of Pulicat lasted for 214 years between 1606 and 1825 till the King of Arcot acceded Chingleput District (which included Pulicat village) to the British in 1825.

Pulicat today bears silent testimony to the Dutch, with the Dutch Fort dating back to 1609 in ruins, a Dutch Church and Cemetery with 22 protected tombs dating from 1631 to 1655 and another Dutch Cemetery with 76 tombs and mausoleums protected by the Archaeological Survey of India (ASI). Netherlands (Dutch) architects and scholars now intend to support efforts to restore this early Dutch settlements.

=== Chronology of Dutch rule in India (1608–1825) ===
| Description | Period (CE) |
|---|---|
| Dutch India settlement at Masulipatnam | 1605 |
| Pulicat a Dutch possession | 1610–1784 |
| Tuticorin a Dutch possession | 1658–1795 |
| Negapatnam a Dutch possession | 1658–1781 |
| Dutch Coromandel Coast settlements occupied by British Raj | 1780–1784 |
| British occupation of Dutch Malabar settlements | 1795–1817 |
| Dutch Coromandel coast settlements restored to Netherlands; Malabar annexed to British India | 1818 |
| Dutch Coromandel ceded to British Raj | 1825 |

== Slave trade ==
For most of the 16th and 17th centuries Europeans on the Coromandal coast were extensively involved in the trading, brokering and shipment of slaves from India to Ceylon and the West Indies. The Dutch were "the nexus of an enormous slave trade" and between 1621 and 1665 alone, used 131 ships to transport 38,441 Indian slaves obtained mostly from Pulicat brokers. In Pulicat, the price of a slave ranged from 27 to 40 guilders in "expensive years" to as little as 4 guilders in "cheap years".

Normally 150 – 400 slaves were shipped each year from central Coromandel ports, including Pulicat, Madras, Nagapatnam and Devanampatnam. This trade increased greatly during several famine periods. Between 1659 and 1661, eight to ten thousand slaves were shipped from central Coromandel ports including Pulicat. Domestic slavery was officially recognized by the English at Madras and run mainly by the Dutch at Pulicat.

Slave labour was a defining element of the high production levels and luxury standards of Dutch colonial settlements throughout the Indian Ocean. Slaves empowered the elite groups, and formed 25% – 66% of the total population of the major settlements, including Pulicat.

== British rule (1825–1947) ==
Though the Pulicot area was ceded to the English in 1760 as a Jagir (estate), and the town was finally captured by the English in 1795, Dutch control of Pulicat lasted till 1825 when it was annexed to Chingulput district, which had been taken from the French by the English in 1753. Thereafter it served as a fishing village and a British health resort.

In 1889, Pulicat had a population of about 5,000. The importance of Pulicat receded with the declining sea power of the Dutch and the increasing role of the Madras Presidency and the British port in Madras, 25 km (15.5 mi) to the south. It got relegated to a village level, with land access becoming difficult due to dense forest growth. Even the Lighthouse, which was rebuilt in 1895, served only to warn passing ships of the dangerous Pulicat shoals.

== Religious traditions ==
Pulicat was an atypical multi-religious community with a history of three prosperous religious traditions.

Hinduism flourished in Pulicat from early 300 BCE, when it was dominated by the Hindu ancient Tamil kingdoms. By 1825, there were several Hindu temples dedicated to the worship of Shiva, Vishnu, Murugan, Amman (mother goddess) and the Gramma Theyvathai (family goddesses). Unlike the Brahmin temples, the Amman temples were open to members of every Jāti.

The Muslim religious community began here in the 9th century with the arrival and settling of Arab maritime traders. After the Dutch fortification of Pulicat, two large mosques and some small places of worship and scripture reading were built by the Moslem traders in Pulicat proper. The mosques built earlier were then used by Moslem boat builders. The traders, descendants of the Khadems from Medina who were previously socially undifferentiated from the boat builders, became a distinct group of "nobility" called Labbay.

Two Amitābha Buddha statues dated to the late Chola period (12th-13th century) were excavated at the villages of Kollapattu and Kunthuru.

Christianity prospered here from the 16th century initiated by Portuguese traders and continued by the Roman Catholic Church they built. There was also a Roman Catholic church in the Christian hamlet of Pattanava, with a Roman Catholic priest appointed by the Madras Bishopric.

The arrival of the monotheistic religions of Islam and Christianity, combined with the breakdown of the earlier Hindu ruled kingdoms and imposition of colonial rule, evolved new forms of rank and communal affiliation among the areas' religious communities. South India was not always a strictly "orthodox" Hindu Society. To the contrary, Christianity, Islam and Brahmanical Hinduism were forces which all came to impinge on the warrior cultures of South India.
