= Kadiyala =

'Kadiyala' is the surname of those belonging to the Kamma caste. People belonging to the Kadiyala group are mostly from East Godavari district, West Godavari district, Chittoor district, the areas of Mustabad, Katuru, and Gudivada in the Krishna district and Guntur district of Andhra Pradesh.

Mustabada is a small farming village in Krishna District and is about 15 km from Vijayawada, the largest city in the Krishna district of Andhra Pradesh. The Kadiyalas were mostly a farming community with farm lands in and around the Krishna River basin and were prosperous in growing rice, tobacco and other crops.

The Kadiyala people originated from Mustabad in the Krishna District of Andhra Pradesh. There is also another view based on oral history that the Kadiyala people migrated from Guntur district to the villages of Katuru and Mustabad in Krishna district sometime in the 19th century. More specifically, Kadiyalas have settled in the area of Katuru, and may have been living there for more than a century.

There are many Kadiyala people that live in Kagupadu, West Godavari district that have been there from 300-plus years, hailing from Mustabad.

Apart from Kadiyalas from Kagupadu, Guntur, Katuru, and Mustabad, there are Kadiyalas from East Godavari district. They are all Brahmin Kadiyalas, hailing from Visweswarayapuram, having been there for over 700-plus years. Antarvedi, the place where the Godavari river merges with the Bay of Bengal, is 20 km away from this place.

There are around 100+ plus families with Kadiyala Surname living in the village named Yallamandaయలౢమ౦ద nearby Narasaraopet In Guntur Dt.
