= Ravella Nayaks =

Hindu dynasty

- 1364–1652
- Status: Dynasty
- Common languages: Telugu
- Religion: Hinduism
- Government: Governors under the Vijayanagara Empire; (Monarchy)
- Historical era: Medieval India
  - Established: 1364
  - Disestablished: 1652
Preceded by	Succeeded by
Kakatiya dynasty; Musunuri Nayakas	Golconda Sultanate
- Today part of: India

The Ravella Nayaks were a prominent Telugu Hindu dynasty who played a critical role in the military and political affairs of South India from the 14th century onward. They belonged to the Kamma community. Originating in the Andhra region after the decline of the Kakatiya and Musunuri dynasties, they rose to prominence as provincial governors by 1364 CE, under the Vijayanagara Empire.

The Ravella Nayaks controlled strategic regions such as Srisailam, Udayagiri, and Podili, and were vital to the Vijayanagara Empire’s frontier defence. Leaders like Ravella Linga II served as chief general under Aliya Rama Raya and played a key role during the turbulent period leading up to the Battle of Talikota (1565).

Their victories over the Qutb Shahis and Gajapatis, and the recapture of forts such as Adoni and Udayagiri, are celebrated in Sovgandhika Prasavapaharanamu, a Telugu epic by Ratnakaram Gopala Kavi. Among their most celebrated leaders was Ravella Veera Malla, who resisted Qutb Shahi incursions, helping to preserve Hindu autonomy in southern Andhra during the empire's decline. Following Krishnadevaraya’s death, the Ravellas, alongside the Pemmasani Nayaks and Sayapaneni Nayaks, were instrumental in supporting the Aravidu dynasty’s ascension after a civil war, and in sustaining imperial resistance against Islamic expansion. This resistance lasted nearly 90 years, ending with the capture of Gandikota in 1652 and the defeat of Pemmasani Timmanayudu by Mir Jumla.

After the empire's decline, a branch of the Ravella family, led by Ravella Veera Mallappa Naidu, migrated to Tamil Nadu and established the Ilaiyarasanendal Zamindari under the Madurai Nayak Kingdom.

== History ==
=== Origin ===
Ravella Nayaks, belonged to the Kamma social group, a prominent Telugu community in South India. They trace their origins to the post Musunuri Nayaka period in the 14th century. After the fall of the Musunuri Nayakas in 1370 CE, a significant number of Kamma clans, including the Ravella clan, migrated to the newly formed Vijayanagara Empire. The Ravella Nayaks quickly established themselves as key players in the empire's military and administrative structures, earning the trust of successive Vijayanagara rulers, including the Sangama, Saluva, Tuluva, and Aravidu dynasties.

=== Extent ===
The Ravella Nayaks controlled significant territories in the southern part of the Vijayanagara Empire, particularly in the region of Rayalseema, Andhra Pradesh. They ruled strategic regions such as Srisailam, Udayagiri, Podili, and Kochcherlakota Seemas. Their strongholds included key towns and forts such as Udayagiri, which was captured after 18 months and resulted in defeat for Prataparudra Deva of the Gajapatis.

=== Rule ===
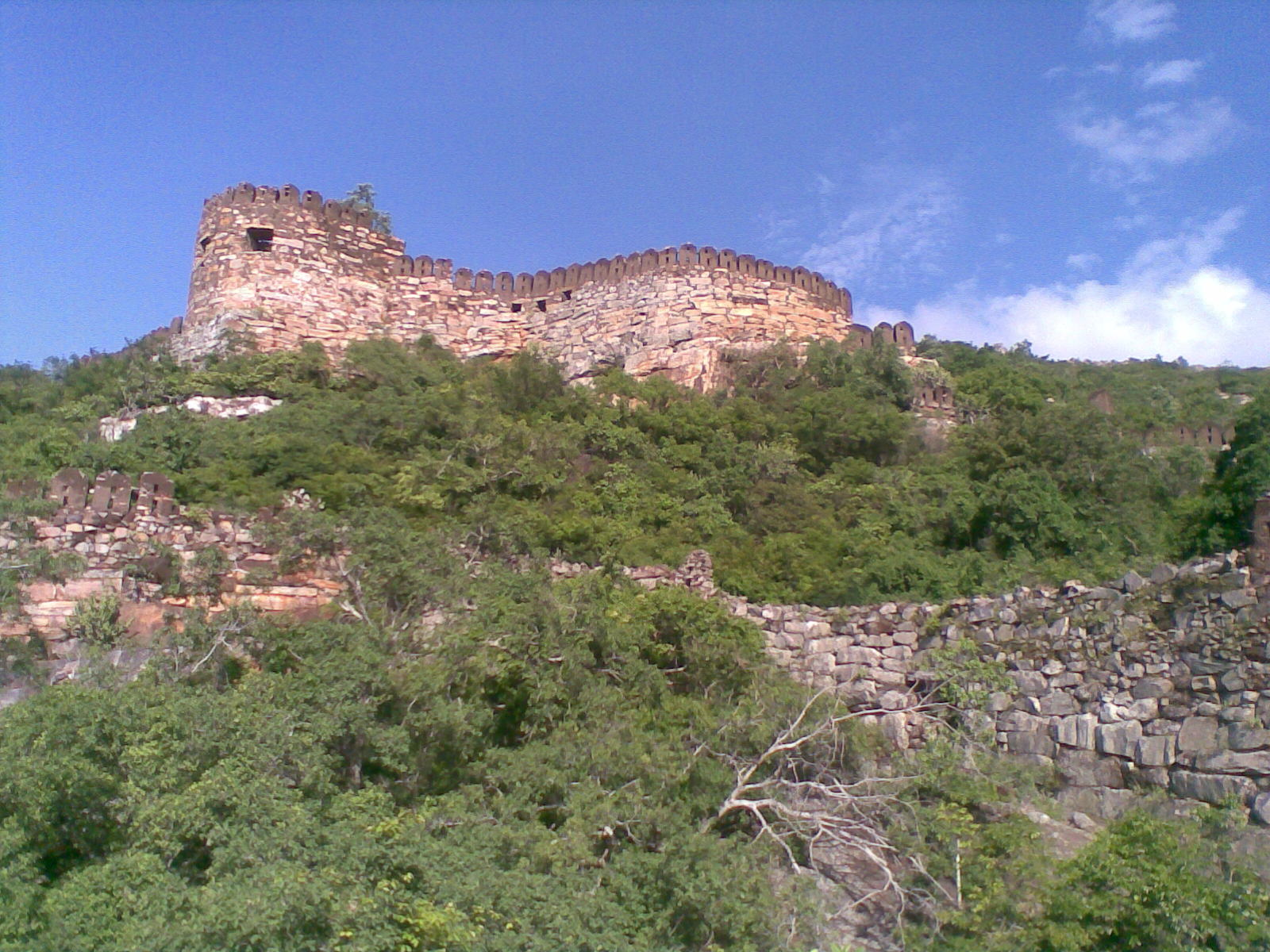
Udayagiri Fort

The Ravella Nayaks served as influential military leaders and provincial governors under the Vijayanagara Empire, particularly during its peak and subsequent decline. Entrusted with defending key frontier regions such as Udayagiri, Podili, and Kochcherlakota Seemas, they played a vital role in maintaining the empire’s territorial integrity. Their service spanned multiple dynasties, including the Sangama, Saluva, Tuluva, and Aravidu dynasty.

During the reign of Krishna Deva Raya, the Ravella Nayaks were prominent commanders in major military campaigns against the Bahmanis, Qutb Shahis, and Gajapatis. Among their most distinguished leaders was Ravella Veera Malla, who defended Gudipadu Fort against Qutb Shahi incursions. Malla’s efforts, along with those of allied Kamma Nayak families like the Pemmasanis and Sayapanenis, helped secure the empire’s northern frontiers and support the rise of the Aravidu dynasty.

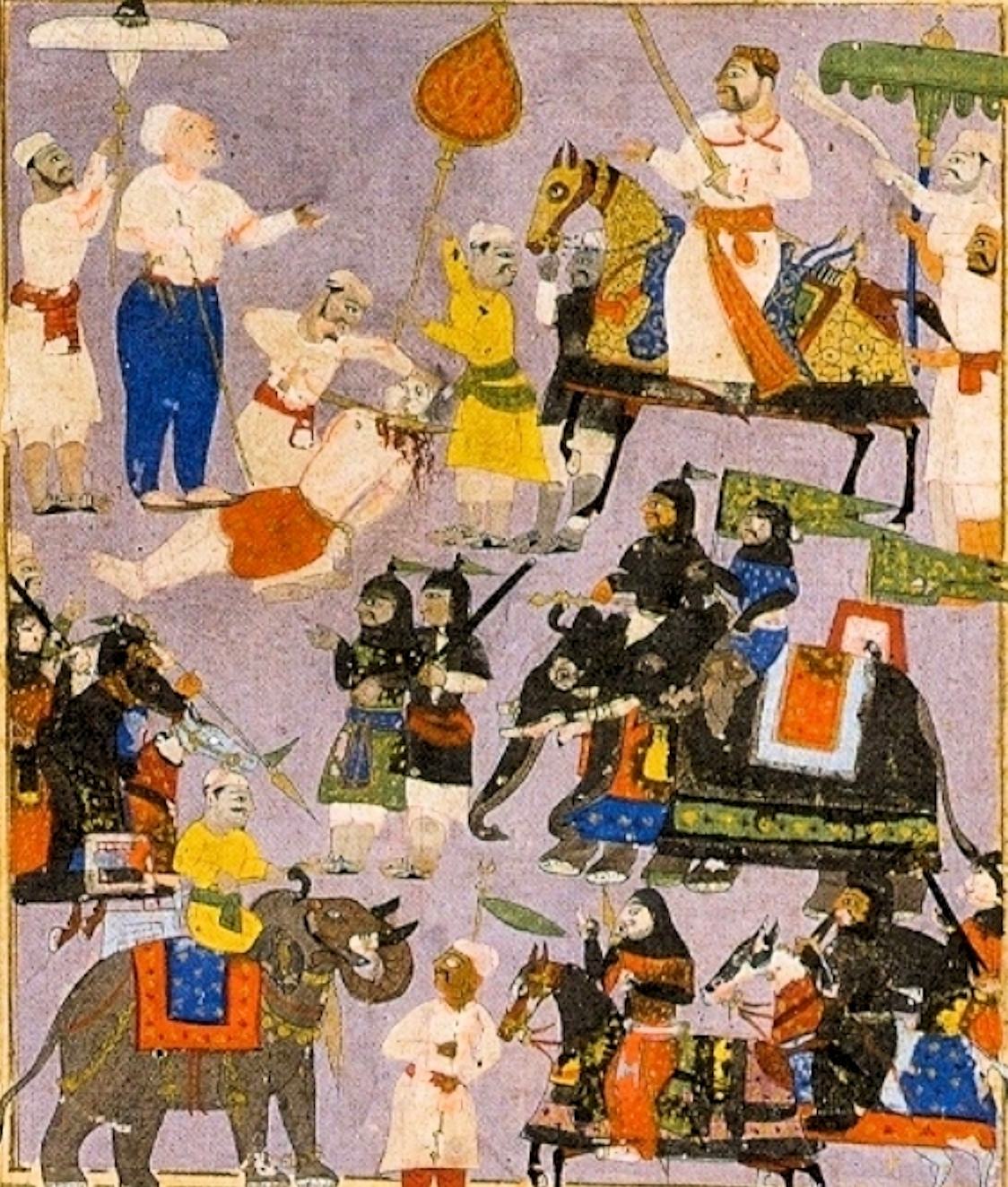
Battle of Talikota

His descendants continued this martial legacy. Tippa, son of Malla, fought the Gajapatis; Papa, Tippa’s son, captured Kandatidlu (Kurnool) from Muslim forces. Ayyappa, in the service of Aliya Rama Raya, earned the title Chenchumala Churakdra for his military excellence. Their campaigns are also corroborated in contemporary Telugu works like Vasucharitram and Balabhagavatam, particularly their capture of forts like Udayagiri, Adoni and Kandatidlu. Following Krishnadevaraya’s death, they were instrumental in supporting the Aravidu dynasty’s ascension after a civil war and in sustaining imperial resistance against Islamic expansion.

Ravella Linga II, another prominent figure, served as chief general under Aliya Rama Raya and led key campaigns to recapture Adoni and defend Penugonda. He played a crucial role in resisting Deccan Sultanate advances and is believed to have participated in several key battles in the empire’s final decades. His leadership during the volatile years leading up to the Battle of Talikota (1565) was instrumental in holding the empire together during internal strife and external threats.

=== Decline ===
The decline of the Ravella Nayaks' power began with the fall of the Vijayanagara Empire after the Battle of Talikota in 1565. Despite their strong military and political contributions, the empire’s fragmentation weakened their influence. The Ravella Nayaks, along with other Kamma warrior clans, continued to resist the growing influence of the Muslim Sultanates in the Deccan region, particularly the Golconda Sultanate. However, their resistance gradually diminished over time. One of the most significant blows to their power came in 1652, when Gandikota, the stronghold of the Pemmasani Nayaks, fell to Mir Jumla, marking the consolidation of Muslim rule in the region.

== Ilaiyarasanendal Zamindari ==
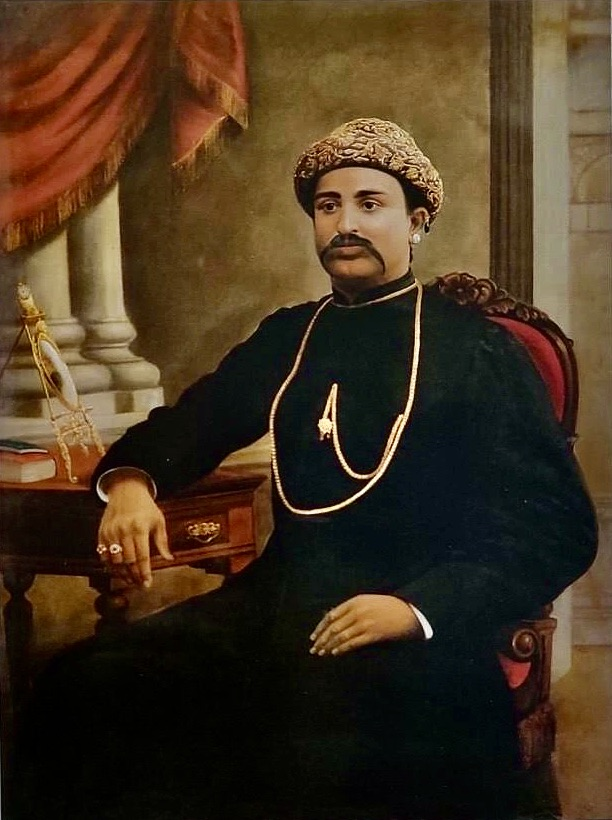
Raja Ravi Varma’s portrait of Maharaja Rajya Sri Ravella Kasturi Ranga Appaswamy Naidu of Ilayarasanendal.

In the aftermath of the Vijayanagara Empire’s decline, a branch of the Ravella family, led by Ravella Veera Mallappa Naidu, migrated to Tamil Nadu and established the Ilaiyarasanendal Zamindari under the Madurai Nayak Kingdom. This estate flourished until the abolition of the zamindari system in the 20th century. The family's legacy endured through figures like Ravella Kasturi Ranga Appaswamy Naidu, celebrated for his philanthropy and honored by British authorities. In 1884, Raja Ravi Varma, who painted only two Telugu royal families, immortalised Ravella Kasturi Ranga Appaswamy Naidu in a portrait, highlighting Ilaiyarasanendal as one of the two premier palayams of the Madurai Nayaks, alongside Kuruvikulam, ruled by the Pemmasani Nayaks.

== See also ==
- Musunuri Nayakas
- Pemmasani Nayaks
- Sayapaneni Nayaks
- Nayaka dynasties
- Vijayanagara Empire
