= Siege of Bankapur =

- Part of Deccani–Vijayanagar wars
Date	1573–1575
Location	Bankapura, Karnataka, India 14.9201°N 75.2625°E
Result	Bijapur victory

Belligerents
Vijayanagara Empire	Bijapur Sultanate

Commanders and leaders
Sriranga I Velappa Raya	Ali Adil Shah I Mustafa Khan

Strength
10,000 infantry 1000 cavalry	Unknown

Casualties and losses
	Heavy
- Location within South Asia

The Siege of Bankapur was military conflict fought between the Bijapur Sultanate under Ali Adil Shah I and Velappa Raya, a Vijayanagara chief. After the Battle of Talikota, Velappa Raya rebelled against Vijayanagara Empire and took shelter in Bankapur Fort. Ali Adil Shah I laid siege to the fort, while Velappa Raya asked the Vijayanagara emperor Sriranga I for help. Sriranga advised him to seek support from neighbouring chiefs and use attacks to disrupt the Bijapur army. Velappa Raya's son and his allies carried out repeated night attacks on the besieging forces. The siege lasted about fifteen months before Velappa Raya surrendered after the death of his son. He was allowed to leave Bankapur with his family.

== Background ==
In 1573, Ali Adil Shah I of Bijapur and Murtaza Nizam Shah I of Ahmednagar met on the borders of their kingdoms and reached an agreement to carry out their conquests in different directions. Murtaza Nizam Shah I was to have Berar, while Ali Adil Shah was free to conquer the territories of Vijayanagara without interference from Ahmadnagar.

Ali Adil Shah I first moved against the fortress of Turkal, which was held by Venkatayasu Raya. After defending the fort for seven months Venkatayasu Raya surrendered. The Sultan then marched against Dharwar one of the strongest forts in Karnataka. It was held by an officer of the late Rama Raya although he paid a small annual tribute to the Vijayanagara Empire had by then become very powerful. Dharwar resisted for six months before finally being captured.

== Siege ==
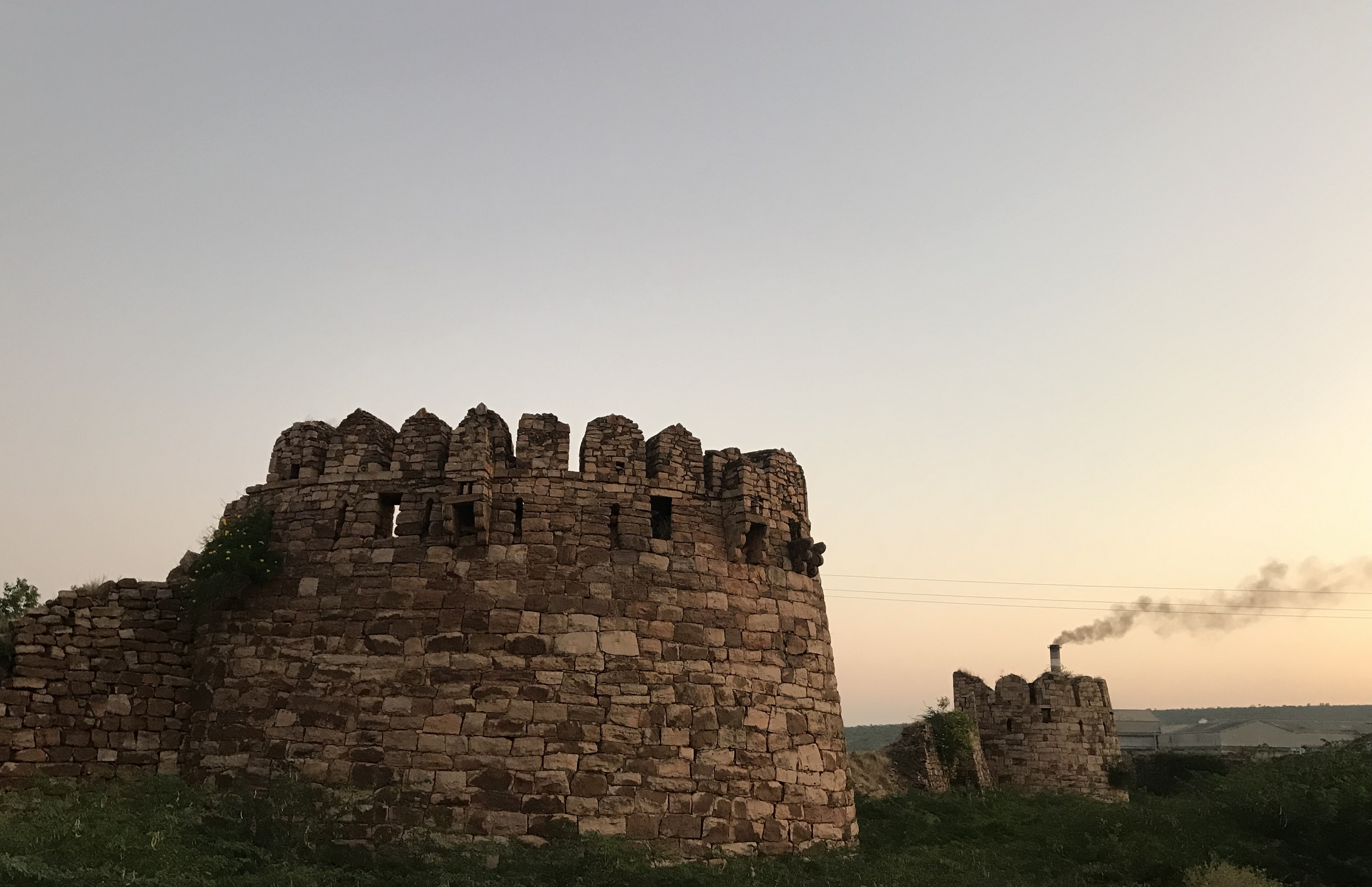
Torgal Fort

Ali Adil Shah I then turned his attention to Bankapur. Its ruler, Velappa Raya had rebelled against Vijayanagara after the Battle of Talikota and shut himself inside the fort. He sent his son with thousand cavalry and ten thousand infantry to occupy the surrounding forests and passes, harass the Bijapur army and cut off its supplies. At the same time, Velappa Raya appealed to Sriranga I for help. The emperor replied that Velappa Raya's own misconduct had caused many of his dependents to rebel and abandon their loyalty. Sriranga I replied that he himself could barely maintain his position at Penukonda and Chandragiri the only places left to him by the Deccan sultanates.

Sriranga I advised Velappa Raya to try to make terms with the Bijapur army by offering money or jewels. If that did not work he suggested that he seek the help of the neighbouring rulers and have them join his son in cutting off the Bijapur army's supplies and making attacks at night. Sriranga I also said that he would order his vassals to help him although he was not sure whether they would obey.

After taking Sriranga I's advice, Velappa Raya persuaded several chiefs to join his son. According to Ferishta the men cared little for their own lives. They went almost naked, covering their bodies with oil so that they could not easily be caught. At night, they entered the Bijapur camp and attacked the sleeping soldiers. Many soldiers were killed in these attacks, which caused fear and discontent among the Bijapur army and nearly forced the Sultan Ali Adil Shah I to lift the siege.

Mustafa Khan tactics put an end to these night attacks, restoring confidence among the Bijapur troops. The siege continued for another year and three months. Velappa Raya finally surrendered after the death of his son on the condition that he and his family would be allowed to leave safely.

== Aftermath ==
After Velappa Raya left the fort of Bankapur, the Bijapur army destroyed a large temple in the town that had stood for more than a century and built a mosque on its foundations.

== See also ==
- Bahamani Sultanate
- Asad Khan Lari
- Chand Bibi
