= Dupadu =

- village
- Interactive map of Dupadu
- Location in Andhra Pradesh, India Dupadu (India)
- Coordinates: 15°55′N 79°22′E
- Country: India
- State: Andhra Pradesh

Languages
  - Official: Telugu
- Time zone: UTC+5:30 (IST)

Dupadu is a major village in Tripuranthakam mandal, Markapuram district, Andhra Pradesh, India. Dupadu is situated on the Kurnool-Guntur state highway and it has an old sivalayam as per the latest reports, an ancient temple of the Hindu deity Lord Chandra Mouliswara(Shiva). Reportedly, the 200-year-old Shiva Temple was well-known decades ago.

== History ==
Its history stretches back to the days when it was ruled by the Mauryas from 250 B.C. The rise of the Satavahanas saw Buddhism flourish in the region. The Ikshvaku and Vijayanagar Kings, the Qutub Shahis and the Mughals later followed these rulers. Each of them left a distinct imprint on the cultural landscape of the district.
