= Ahobilam =

Village in Andhra Pradesh, India

Ahobilam 1st Nava Narasimha Temple
- Town
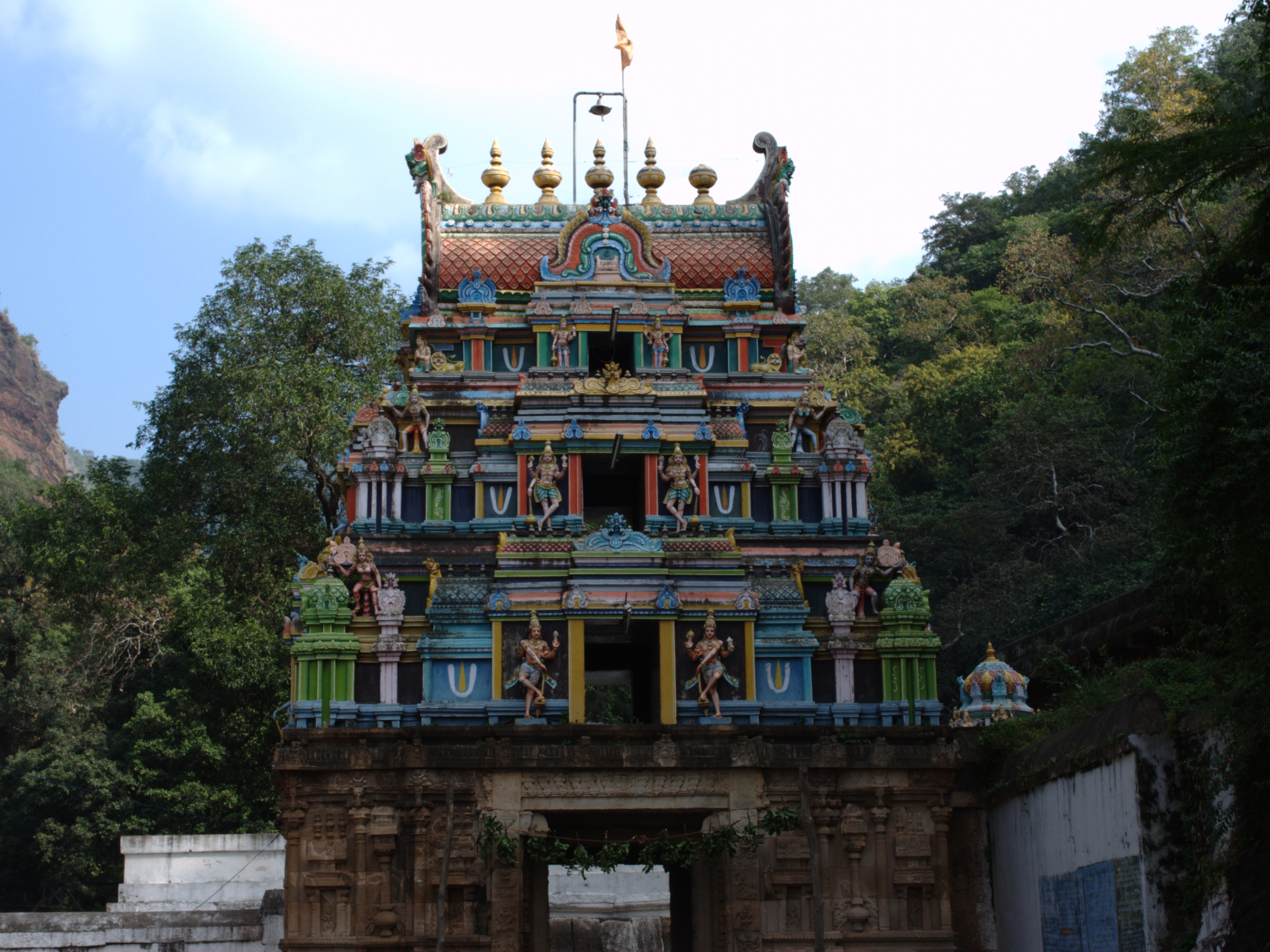
- Upper Ahobilam temple Gopuram

- Location in Andhra Pradesh, India
- Coordinates: 15.1333°N 78.7167°E
- Country: India
- State: Andhra Pradesh
- District: Nandyal
- Elevation: 327 m (1,073 ft)

Population
  - Total: 3,732

Languages
  - Official: Telugu
- Time zone: UTC+5:30 (IST)
- Vehicle registration: AP
- Website: http://ahobilamtemple.com

Ahobilam is a town and holy site in the Allagadda mandal of Nandyal district in the Indian state of Andhra Pradesh. It is surrounded by the Eastern Ghats with several mountain hills and gorges. It is the centre of worship of Narasimha, the lion-headed avatar of Vishnu, along with his consort Pratyangira, an avatar of Lakshmi. It is one of the nine Hindu temples and shrines dedicated to this deity. The main village and a temple complex are at Lower Ahobilam. Upper Ahobilam, about 8 kilometres to the east, has more temples in a steep gorge. The site has evidence of historical patronage from a number of regional dynasties, with the most significant being that of the Vijayanagara Kingdom.

== History ==
The history of Ahobilam before the 16th century is obscure. One of the earliest literary references to Ahobilam is in the 9th-century Tamil-language religious work Periyatirumoḻi written by Thirumangai Alvar, where it is eulogized; this led to it being codified as one of the 108 canonical Divya Desams. Ahobilam finds subsequent mention in several Sanskrit and Telugu-language texts between the 12th and 16th centuries.

Inscriptions and other material evidence indicate that the shrines of the town received patronage from the Kakatiya and Reddi dynasties during the 13th and 14th centuries. The historical record is more prominent during the Vijayanagara period. The site received significant patronage from rulers of the Vijayanagara kingdom, starting with the Saluva dynasty in the 15th century, and sustained by the Tuluva dynasty in the 16th century. Most inscriptions at the shrines date to the Tuluva period. The ruler Krishnadevaraya visited and patronised the town's shrines in the 16th century. The town is also the birthplace of the Ahobila Matha, a monastic institution founded during the medieval period; scholars have proposed the late 15th or early 16th century as the possible periods of origin.

Ahobilam lost imperial patronage with the decline of the Vijayanagara kingdom. The site faced a raid in 1579 by Murahari Rao, a commander of the Golconda Sultanate. Ahobilam's temple was sacked and its bejewelled idol presented to Golconda's sultan.

== Geography ==
Ahobilam is located at 15.1333°N 78.7167°E. It is located in Nallamala Forest, along the Eastern Ghats.

== Structure and shrines ==
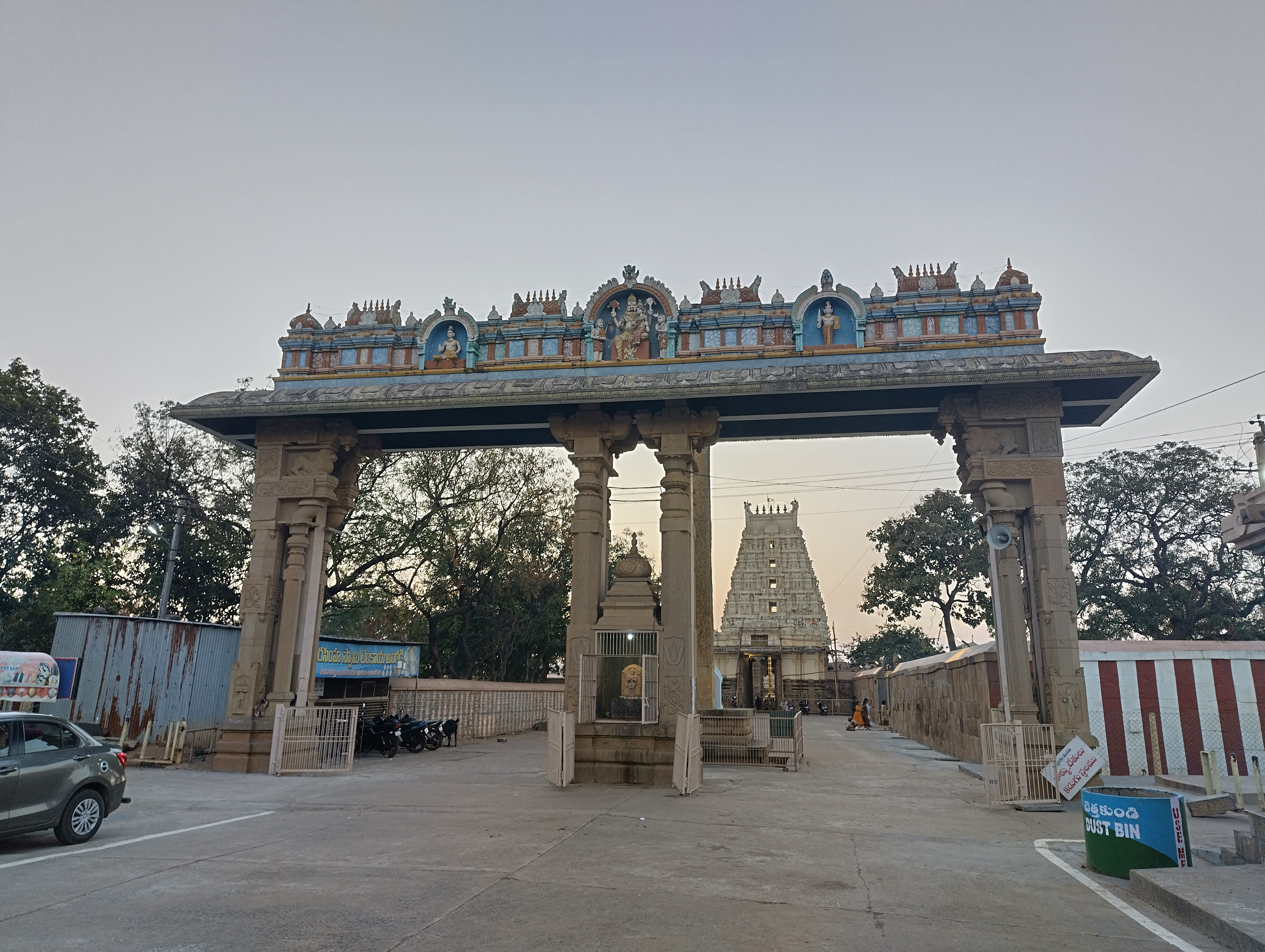
Entrance to the Prahladavarada temple

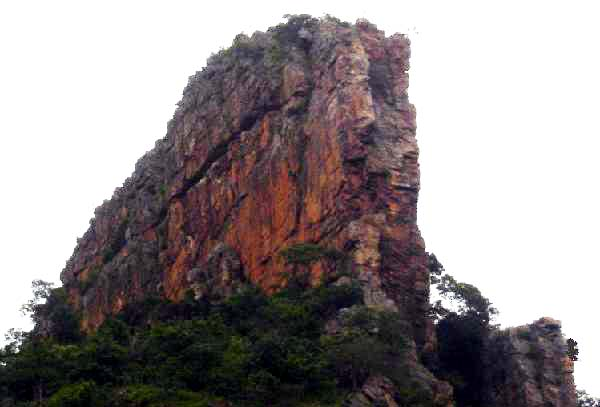
Close-up shot of Ugra stambham peak at Ahobilam, Nallamala Hills

The town of Ahobilam is home to ten shrines of Narasimha, the man-lion incarnation of the god Vishnu in Hinduism. The town can be divided into Lower and Upper Ahobilam, which are separated from each other by 8 km. Upper Ahobilam refers to a forested area that sprawls up a ravine. The area is marked by nine different shrines of Narasimha representing nine aspects of the deity, as follows:

- Ahobilanarasiṃha
- Bhārgavanarasiṃha
- Jvālānarasiṃha
- Yogānandanarasiṃha
- Chatravātanarasiṃha
- Karañjanarasiṃha
- Pāvananarasiṃha
- Mālolanarasiṃha
- Vārāhanarasiṃha

The shrine of Ahobilanarasimha is the earliest shrine of Ahobilam, and is dedicated to the ugra (ferocious) aspect of Narasimha.

Lower Ahobilam is contiguous with the populated area of the town, and hosts the town's main pilgrimage attraction, termed the Prahlādavarada temple. This shrine dates primarily to the 16th century; its construction may have begun during the reign of Saluva Narasimha Deva Raya, first member of the Saluva dynasty, around the 15th/16th century. It is the last of the shrines built at Ahobilam. It is dedicated to the saumya (mild) aspect of Narasimha. Most inscriptions at Ahobilam are found at this temple.
