= Tirumala Deva Raya =

Emperor of Vijayanagara from 1570 to 1572

- Emperor
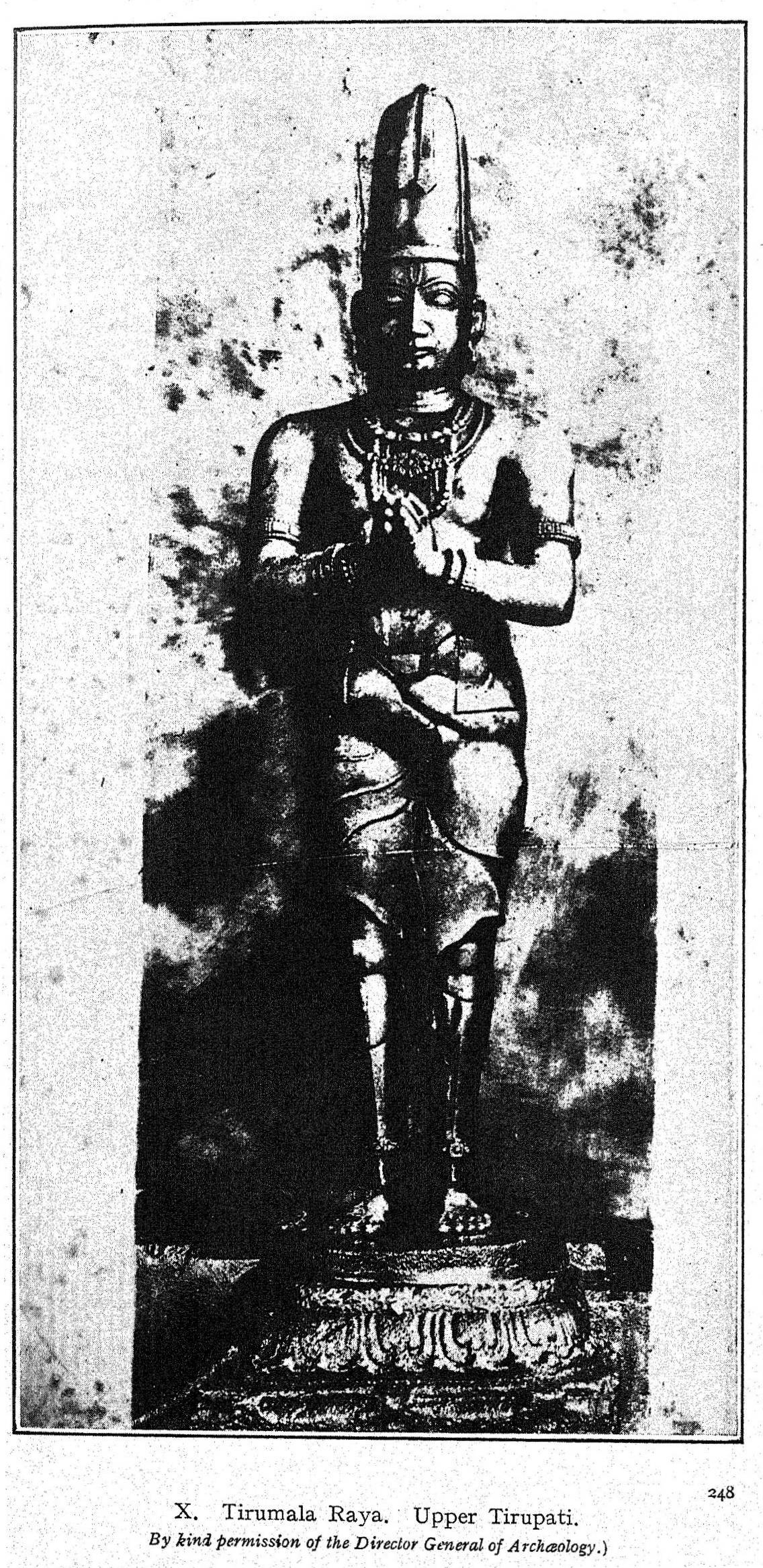

Emperor of Vijayanagara
- Reign: 1570–1572
- Predecessor: Sadasiva Raya
- Successor: Sriranga I
- Spouse: Vengalamba
- Issue: Sriranga Deva Raya; Venkatapati Deva Raya
- Dynasty: Aravidu
- Religion: Hinduism

Tirumala Deva Raya (reigned 1570–1572) was the first crowned Emperor of Vijayanagara from the Aravidu Dynasty. He was the younger brother of Rama Raya and the husband of Princess Vengalamba, making him the son-in-law of Emperor Krishna Deva Raya. Following the Battle of Talikota, he rescued the last Tuluva Emperor, Sadasiva Raya, and relocated the imperial capital to Penukonda. After Sadasiva's death in 1570 CE, he ascended as the Emperor of Vijayanagara. He was succeeded by his son, Sriranga I in 1572.

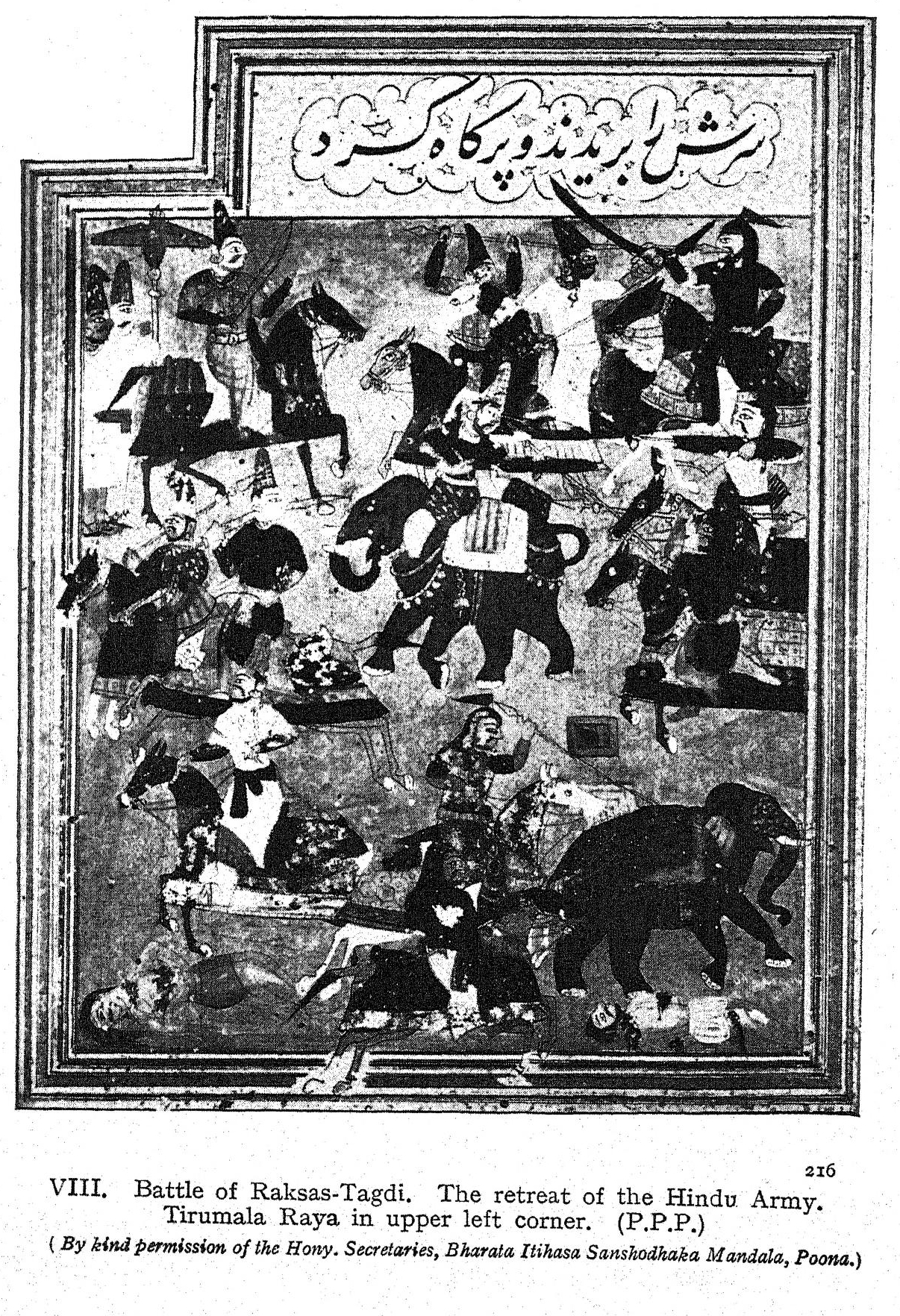

== Muslim Invasion of Penukonda ==
Tirumala Raya escaped the Battle of Talikota and afterwards shifted his capital to Penukonda. He later repulsed a Muslim invasion on Penukonda.

== Bibliography ==
- Rao, Velcheru Narayana; Shulman, David Dean; Subrahmanyam, Sanjay (1992), Symbols of substance: court and state in Nāyaka Period Tamilnadu, Oxford University Press, ISBN 978-0-19-563021-3
- Sastri, K. A. Nilakanta (1958), A History of South India: From Prehistoric Times to the Fall of Vijayanagar (Second ed.), Indian Branch, Oxford University Press
- Subrahmanyam, Sanjay; Shulman, David (2008), "The Men who would be King? The Politics of Expansion in Early Seventeenth-Century Northern Tamilnadu", Modern Asian Studies, 24 (2): 225–248, doi:10.1017/S0026749X00010301, ISSN 0026-749X, S2CID 146726950

Preceded by Rama Raya	Vijayanagar empire 1565–1572	Succeeded by Sriranga I
