= Telugu states =

Collective term for Andhra Pradesh and Telangana

Telugu states తెలుగు రాష్ట్రాలు (Telugu Rāṣṭrālu)
- Ethno Region
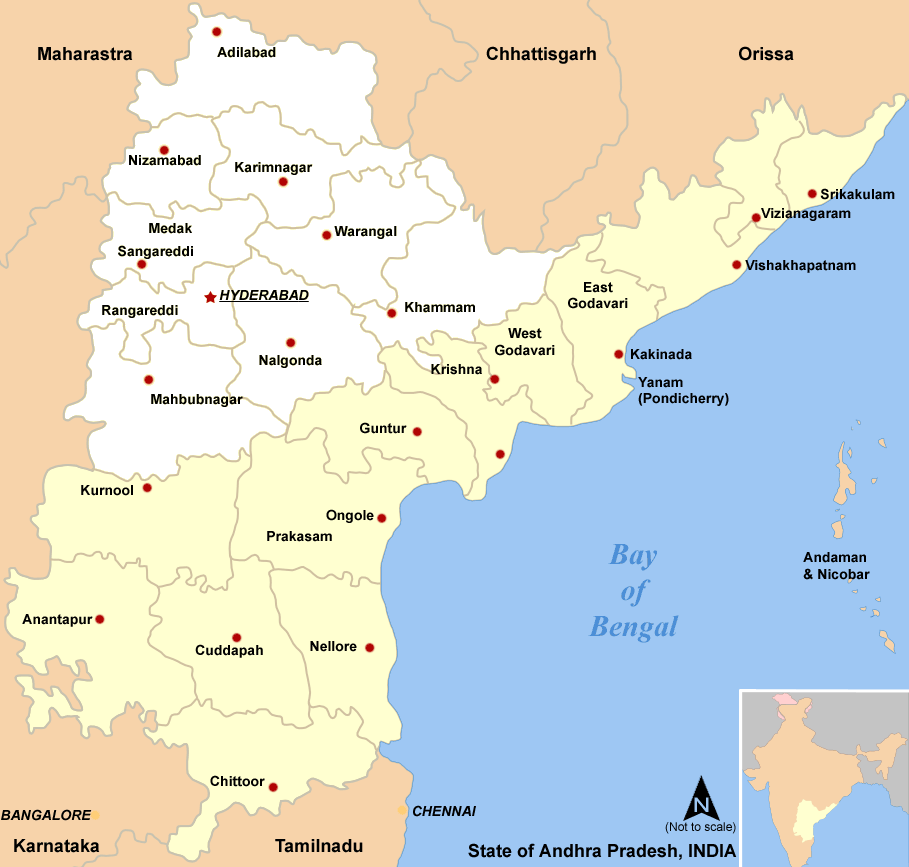
- Andhra Pradesh, Telangana and Yanam
- Country: India
- States: Andhra Pradesh; Telangana; Yanam
- Largest city: Hyderabad
- Major cities (2011 Census of India): Visakhapatnam; Vijayawada; Warangal; Guntur; Tirupati; Nellore

Area
  - Total: 275,052 km^{2} (106,198 sq mi)

Population (2011 Census of India)
  - Total: 84,580,777
  - Density: 307.508/km^{2} (796.443/sq mi)
- Time zone: UTC+5:30 (Indian Standard Time)
- Official languages: Telugu, Urdu (Official)

The Telugu states refer to the Indian states of Andhra Pradesh and Telangana where Telugu is spoken as the primary language. The predominant population of Telugu speaking Indians reside in these states. When put together, the region is bordered by Maharashtra to the north, Karnataka to the west, Odisha, Chhattisgarh to the northeast, Tamil Nadu to the south and the Bay of Bengal, Yanam district enclave of Puducherry to the east.

The unified state of Andhra Pradesh was established in 1956 through the merger of the Telugu-speaking Andhra State with the Telangana region of the former Hyderabad State under the States Reorganisation Act. The referential term of Telugu states has been in use ever since the bifurcation of Andhra Pradesh in 2014, into Andhra Pradesh and Telangana. Based on the 2023 population estimates, Telangana has a population of 38,272,000, and Andhra Pradesh has 53,340,000 bringing the combined population of the Telugu states to 91.62 million.

== History ==
Following the Independence of India in 1947, Telugu-speaking population was divided between Hyderabad State and Madras State. To gain an independent state based on linguistic identity and to protect the interests of the Telugu-speaking people of Madras State, Potti Sreeramulu fasted to death in 1952. The Telugu-speaking area of Andhra State was carved out of Madras state on 1 October 1953, with Kurnool as its capital city.

Vishalandhra was the term used in post-independence India for a united state for all Telugu speakers. On the basis of the Gentlemen's Agreement of 1956, the States reorganisation act created Andhra Pradesh by merging the neighbouring Telugu-speaking areas of the Hyderabad State with Hyderabad as the capital on 1 November 1956.

== Language ==
Telugu is spoken across the Telugu states. As of 2022, Urdu has also gained official status in both the states. Telugu stands alongside Hindi, Bengali and English as one of the few languages with primary official language status in more than one Indian state. It is one of eleven languages designated a classical language of India by the country's government.

== Culture ==
Given the proximity of the two states and the shared language, there are quite a few similarities between the states like cuisine (see Telugu cuisine, Andhra cuisine and Hyderabadi cuisine) and cinema (see Telugu cinema).
