= Sriranga Deva Raya =

Emperor of Vijayanagara from 1572 to 1586

- Emperor

Emperor of Vijayanagara
- Reign: 1572–1586
- Predecessor: Tirumala Deva Raya
- Successor: Venkata II
- Dynasty: Aravidu
- Father: Tirumala Deva Raya
- Mother: Vengalamba
- Religion: Hinduism

Sriranga Deva Raya (reigned 1572–1586), also known as Sriranga I, was the second Emperor of Vijayanagara from the Aravidu Dynasty. He reigned from the fortress of Penukonda. Sriranga succeeded his father, Emperor Tirumala Deva Raya. After the fall of Vijayanagara to the Turko-Persian Sultanates of Deccan, he carried out the restoration of the empire from Penukonda. His reign was marred by repeated invasions and subsequent losses of territory to his Turko-Persian Muslim neighbours.

In 1576, the Turko-Persian Sultan of Bijapur Ali Adil Shah I laid siege to Sriranga's capital fortress in Penukonda for three months, but at the end the emperor defeated the invading sultan which helped his general Savaram Chennappa defeat the Bijapur army.

In 1579, the Turko-Persian Sultan of Golconda raided and plundered the rich temple of Narasimha at Ahobilam. By 1580, the Kondaveedu province was lost to the same. Sriranga successfully recaptured Ahobilam.

He died in 1586, without an heir and was succeeded by his youngest brother Venkatapathi Raya, the governor of Chandragiri.

== Bibliography ==
- Rao, P. Raghunatha (1994), History And Culture Of Andhra Pradesh: From The Earliest Times To The Present Day, Sterling Publishers, ISBN 81-207-1719-8

Preceded by Tirumala Deva Raya	Vijayanagar empire 1572–1586	Succeeded by Venkata II
