= Aravidu dynasty =

Fourth and last dynasty of the Vijayanagara empire (c. 1542–1646 CE)

The Aravidu Dynasty was the fourth and last Hindu dynasty of the Vijayanagara Empire in South India. Its founder was Tirumala Deva Raya, whose brother Rama Raya had been the masterful regent of the last ruler of the previous dynasty. Rama Raya's death at the Battle of Talikota in 1565 led to the subsequent destruction of Vijayanagar by the combined forces of the Muslim states of the Deccan. The Aravidu family claimed to be Kshatriyas and were based in Andhra region. They claimed to belong to the Atreya gotra and traced their lineage to the Eastern Chalukya king Rajaraja Narendra.

The Aravidu dynasty, before the rise of Vijaynagara Empire, ruled as the Rajas of Kurnool under Kakatiya empire and later as Rajas of Anegondi under Vijayanagara empire. After Talikota, they re-established the Vijayanagara Empire

== List of rulers ==
The main rulers of the Aravidu dynasty were:

- Rama Raya (1542–1565 CE), first ruler
- Tirumala Deva Raya (1565–1572 CE)
- Sriranga Deva Raya (Sriranga I) (1572–1586 CE)
- Venkatapati Deva Raya (Venkata II) (1586–1614 CE)
- Sriranga II (1614–1617 CE)
- Rama Deva Raya (1617–1632 CE)
- Peda Venkata Raya (Venkata III) (1632–1642 CE)
- Sriranga III (1642–1652 CE), last ruler of dynasty and empire

== See also ==
- Vijayanagar Empire
- Battle of Toppur 1616 - 1617
- Aravidu Somadeva
