= Pemmasani Nayaks =

Clan in Andhra Pradesh, India

- 1368–1652
- Status: Dynasty
- Capital: Gandikota
- Common languages: Telugu
- Religion: Hinduism
- Government: Governors under the Vijayanagara Empire; (Monarchy)
- Historical era: Medieval India
  - Established: 1368
  - Disestablished: 1652
Preceded by	Succeeded by
Kakatiya dynasty; Musunuri Nayakas	Golconda Sultanate

The Pemmasani Nayaks were a prominent Telugu Hindu dynasty who rose to power in the 14th century, primarily controlling Rayalaseema in Andhra Pradesh. They belonged to the Kamma community. They initially served the Kakatiya dynasty and later aligned with the Vijayanagara Empire around 1370 CE, following the decline of the Musunuri Nayaks in Warangal.

They were instrumental in the defense and expansion of the Vijayanagara Empire. They commanded large mercenary armies that formed the vanguard of Vijayanagara’s forces during the 16th century. Their stronghold was Gandikota, on the Pennar River, significantly fortified by Pemmasani Thimma Nayudu, who transformed it into a key military bastion. Pemmasani Ramalinga Nayudu was a leading commander under Krishnadevaraya. The Pemmasanis played a critical role in the civil war following Krishnadevaraya’s death. Rama Raya and the Aravidu dynasty rose to power following a civil war, largely because of the support of Pemmasani Erra Timmanayudu. Pemmasani Pedda Timmaraja served as the minister for Sriranga I and later for Venkata II, the latter overseeing a revival of the Vijayanagara empire.

The Pemmasanis built and patronized significant Hindu temple construction, such as the Bugga Ramalingeshwara Swamy Temple and the Chintalarayaswami Temple, reinforcing their influence in religious and cultural spheres. Following the Battle of Talikota (1565) and the decline of Vijayanagara, a section of the Pemmasani family migrated south and established the Kuruvikulam Zamindari in Tamil Nadu, which thrived until 1949. Those who remained in Andhra were referred to as the "Gandikota Kammas," they ruled Gandikota and surrounding estates until the mid-17th century. Along with other influential clans the Ravella Nayaks and Sayapaneni Nayaks, they supported the Aravidu Dynasty in resisting Muslim advances. This resistance lasted nearly 90 years, ending with the capture of Gandikota in 1652 and the defeat of Pemmasani Timmanayudu by Mir Jumla.

== History ==
=== Origin ===
The Pemmasani Nayaks belonged to the Kamma social group, a prominent Telugu community in South India. Traditionally associated with agrarian and administrative roles, the Pemmasani clan, in particular, rose to prominence through their military leadership and governance of key territories.

According to Yadiki Kaifiat, Vijayanagara Emperor Phrauda Deva Raya granted Nayankarship of Yadiki to Pemmasani Timma Nayaka in 1424–1444 AD period marking the beginning of the rule of Pemmasani Nayaks. According to Tadipatri Kaifiat, Vijayanagara Emperor Sri Krishna Deva Raya granted Nayankarship of Tadipatri to Pemmasani Timma Nayaka between 1509 and 1529 AD period marking the beginning of the rule of Pemmasani Nayaks. After the collapse of Vijayanagara Empire in 1565 at the battle of Tallikota, Pemmasani Nayaks ruled Gandikota, Yadiki, Gutti and Tadipatri estates for over 100 years from 1565 to 1685.

=== Geography ===
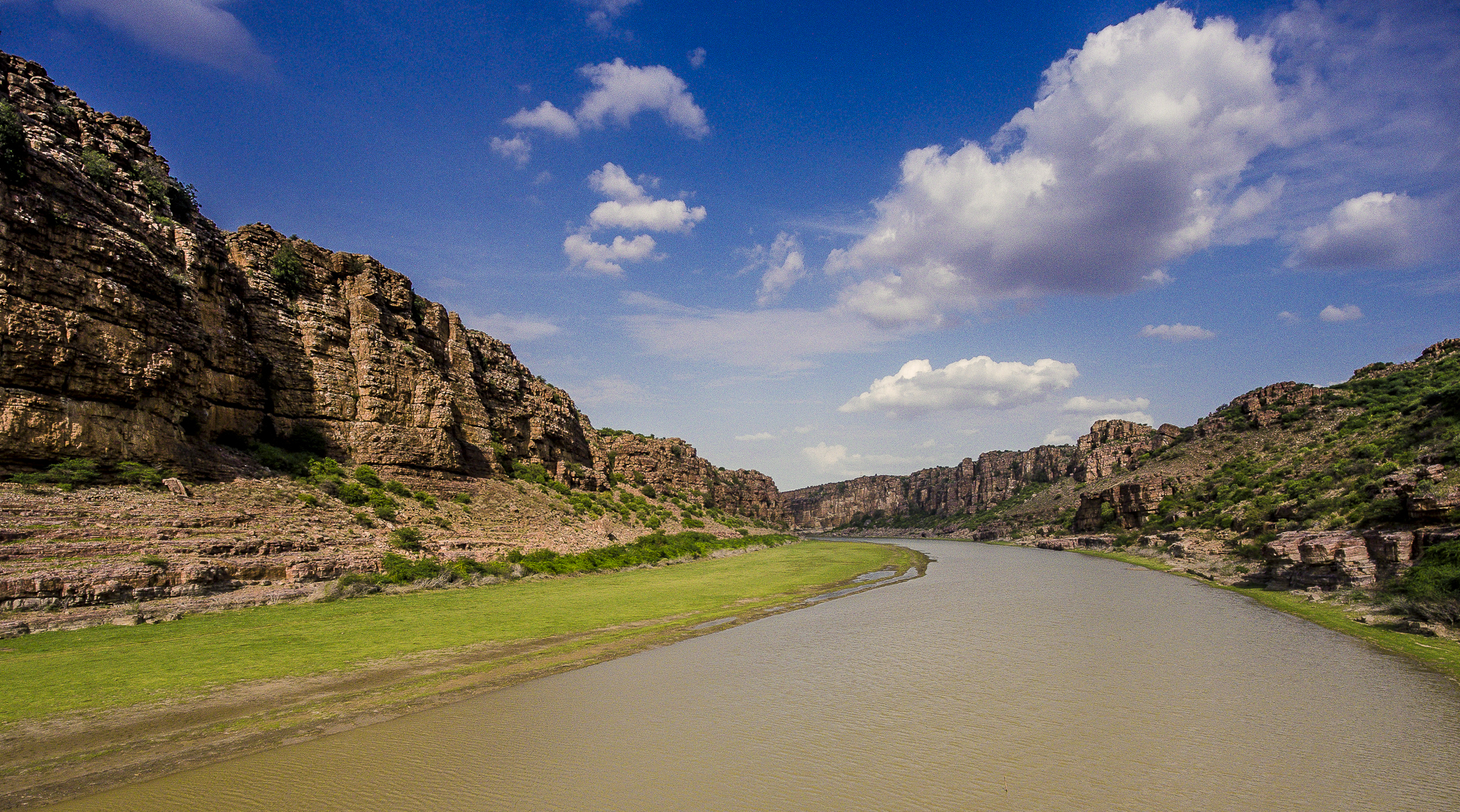
Gandikota on the banks of the Pennar River

Their stronghold was the Gandikota Fort, located on the banks of the Pennar River in Andhra Pradesh. Originally founded in 1123, the fort was significantly fortified and expanded under the Pemmasani Nayaks, particularly by Pemmasani Thimma Nayudu, enhancing its defenses and transforming it into a critical military bastion.

=== Extent ===
The Pemmasani Nayaks ruled Yadiki, Gooty, Tadipatri, and Gandikota. The maximum extent of Pemmasanis feudatorial influence ranged from Gandikota to Kondapalli during the reign of Pemmasani Ramalinga Nayaka which includes areas like Gooty, Kondaveedu, Bellamkonda, Kanchi, Tadipatri, Yadaki. Pemmasanis helped Araveeti kings to ascend the throne of great Vijayanagar Empire when there was power shift between Tuluva and Araveedu dynasties after the Battle of Tallikota in 1565 A. D. where the Vijayanagar empire under Tuluva dynasty rule faced huge defeat against combined forces of Deccan Sultanates. Pemmasanis played a crucial role in protecting the Vijayanagar empire. This is evident from the prime location of land that Vijayanagar kings have provided to Pemmasanis in Hampi as camp when they visited the city.

=== Rule and Military Contributions ===
The first ruler of Pemmasani clan was Pemmasani Timmanayudu who fought many a battle and won the trust of Bukka Raya.

Veera Thimma had a son by name Chennappa who had two sons Ramalinga Naidu and Peda Thimma Naidu. Ramalinga ruled Gandikota (1509-1530 CE) during the time of Krishna Deva Raya. Ramalinga had 80,000 soldiers under him and he played a crucial role in the victory of Krishna Deva Raya over the combined armies of Kalaburagi, Golkonda and Ahmednagar. His exploits in the battle were extolled by many Telugu poets. He was the most feared by the Generals of Bijapur, Ahmednagar and Golconda.

Thimma Naidu II participated in the expeditions of Krishna Deva Raya and captured Udayagiri, Addanki, Kondapalli, Rajahmundry and Katakam (Cuttack). He also played a crucial role in the conquest of Ummattur.

After the death of Krishna Deva Raya in 1529, his son-in-law Rama Raya took control of the kingdom. The Bahamani sultan colluded with Salakam Timmaraja and raided Vijayanagar. Ramaraya took refuge in Gandikota. Bangaru Thimma Naidu vanquished Bahamanis in a fierce battle at Komali, killed Salakam Timmaraja and restored the throne to Ramaraya.

=== Religious and Cultural Patronage ===
The Pemmasanis were significant patrons of Hindu temples. Notable constructions under their patronage include the Bugga Ramalingeshwara Swamy Temple and the Chintalarayaswami Temple.

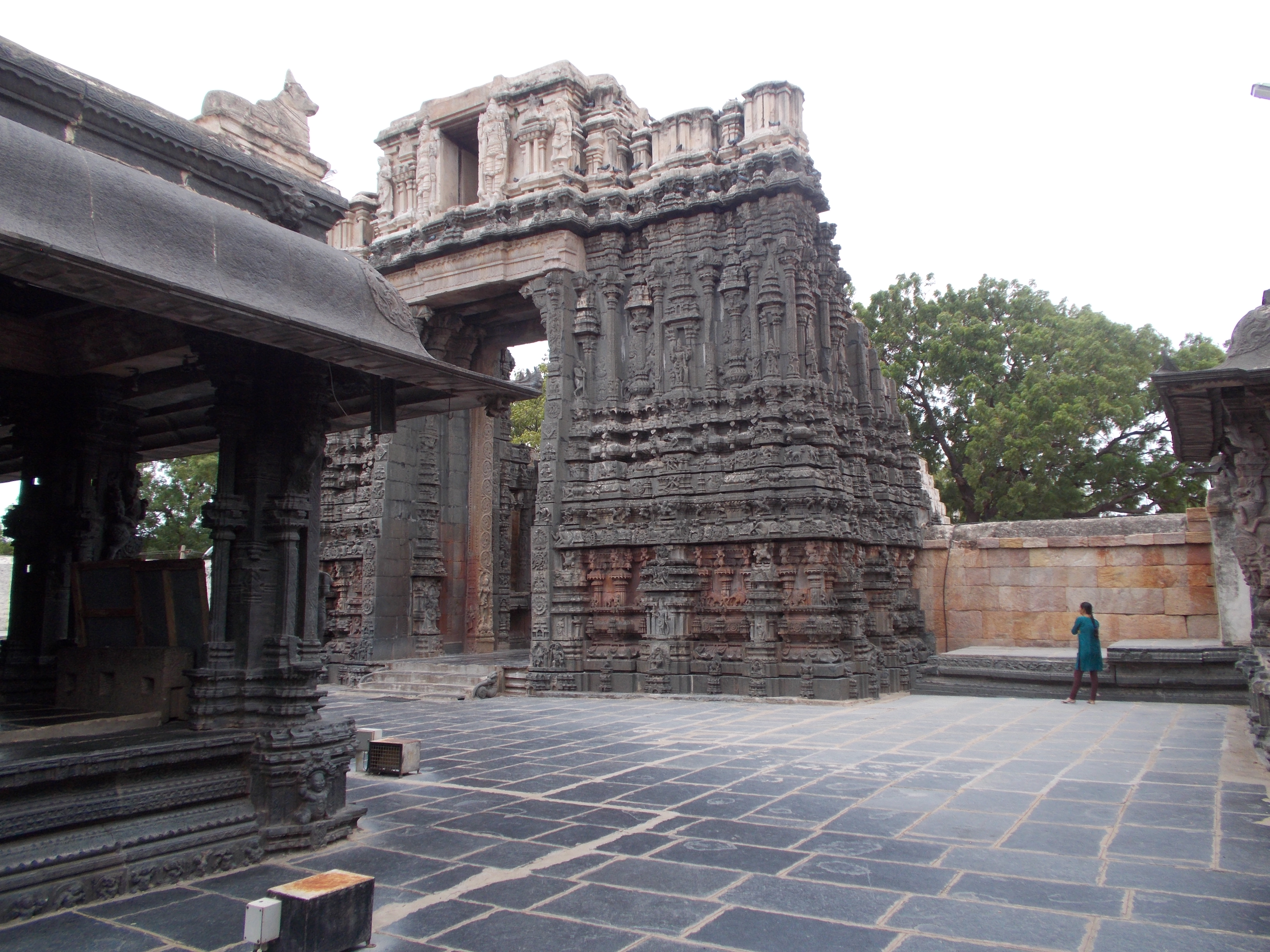
Musical pillars at Bugga Ramalingeswara Swamy Temple

Bugga Ramalingeswara Swamy Temple

Constructed between 1490 and 1509 CE by Pemmasani Ramalinga Nayudu I, this Shiva temple is situated on the southern bank of the Penna River in Tadipatri, Anantapur district, Andhra Pradesh. The temple is renowned for its unique architectural features, including seven musical pillars in front of the Vishnu shrine that produce the 'saptaswara' (seven musical notes) when struck. The temple's gopurams (gateway towers) remain unfinished and have been described by architectural historian James Anderson as "wonders".

Chintala Venkataramana Swamy Temple

Built in the mid-16th century by Pemmasani Timmanayudu II, a subordinate of Krishnadevaraya, this Vaishnavite temple is dedicated to Lord Venkateswara and is located in Tadipatri, Anantapur district. The temple is notable for its Dravidian architectural style, featuring intricate granite sculptures and a Garuda Mandapa designed as a chariot with rotating granite wheels. The temple's main deity, a 10-foot-high idol of Venkateswara, is uniquely illuminated by sun rays directly touching its feet during the Mukkoti Ekadasi festival.

=== Decline ===
The Pemmasani Nayaks, along with Ravella and Sayapaneni Nayaks, played a pivotal role in supporting the Aravidu dynasty during a period of sustained resistance against the advancing Muslim sultanates in the Deccan. Their combined military efforts were instrumental in preserving the integrity of the Vijayanagara territories in Andhra for several decades following the Battle of Talikota in 1565. However, by the mid-17th century, the balance of power had shifted. The growing dominance of the Golconda Sultanate in the region led to a concerted campaign to subdue remaining Hindu strongholds. This culminated in the capture of Gandikota in 1652 and the decisive defeat of Pemmasani Timmanayudu by the Golconda general Mir Jumla. The fall of Gandikota marked the end of Pemmasani military and political influence in the Rayalaseema region and signified the final consolidation of Muslim power across much of coastal and interior Andhra.

== Kuruvikulam Zamindari ==
Following the Battle of Talikota, a branch of the Gandikota Pemmasani family migrated to Tamil Nadu and established the Kuruvikulam Zamindari. This estate, which included Kuruvikulam and Ilaiyarasanendal, became the most prominent Zamindari in Tamil Nadu and persisted from 1565 to 1949.

== Sources ==
Pemmasani Nayaks are known to be the feudatory rulers of Gandikota in the sixteenth century, serving under Aravidu dynasty (1542–1652), especially Rama Raya. The late sixteenth century Telugu text Rayavachakamu mentions Pemmasani Ramalinga Nayudu as a Kamma chief serving Krishnadeva Raya (r. 1509–1529). It is not known whether he served Krishnadeva Raya or some later ruler. Ramalinga Nayudu, the military commender of Gandikota Fort was in the court of Krishnadeva Raya as clearly mentioned in Rayavachakamu (Telugu).

== See also ==
- Gandikota
- Musunuri Nayakas
- Sayapaneni Nayaks
- Ravella Nayaks
- Nayaka dynasties

== Bibliography ==
- Wagoner, Phillip B. (1993), Tidings of the king: a translation and ethnohistorical analysis of the Rāyavācakamu, University of Hawaii Press, ISBN 978-0-8248-1495-3
- Ananda Kumar, P. 2025. Pemmasani Nayaks: Vanguard of Vijayanagara. Ananda Publications, Hyderabad, India.
