= Pemmasani Timmanayudu II =

Pemmasani Timmanayudu II was a member of the Pemmasani Nayaks. He was the son of Pemmasani Ramalinga I and a contemporary of Vira Narasimharaya and Krishnadevaraya. After the death of his father, Timmanayudu went to inform the Vijayanagara Emperor of the progress made in developing the Rayalaseema region. The emperor was so pleased with what he heard that he made Timmanayudu the commandant of the Gandikota Fort on behalf of Saluva Govindaraja, its governor. Then, Timmanayudu gave control of Yadiki and Tadipatri, which were previously controlled by his ancestors, to a relative and shifted to Gandikota.

Timmanayudu strengthened Gandikota Fort, and he administered Gandikota sima. The kaifiyat of Tadipatri states that the Madhwa teacher Vysaraja passed through the estates of Timmanayudu while on his pilgrimage to Rameswaram. Vysaraja appointed a Madhawa archaka in a temple near Tadipatri.

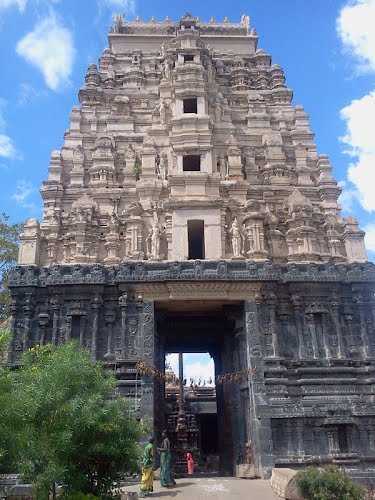
Entrance Chintala Venkatarama Swamy Temple, which was built by Timmanayudu II.

While Timmanayudu was at Gandikota, his deputies continued developing Tadipatri and Yadiki. Timmanayudu also was involved in Tadipatri. Timmanayudu built the Chintalarayaswami Temple (Sri Chintala Venkataramana Temple) in Tadipatri after Vishnu supposedly told Timmanayudu in a dream that a temple should be constructed for him. Timmanayudu appointed two archakas and a chief-priest, and he gifted lands to the temple. The Chintalarayaswami Temple is considered as one of the finest examples of Vijayanagara architecture.

Timmanayudu had three children: Pemmasani Ramalinga Nayudu II, Erra Timmanayudu (Pedda Timmanayudu), and Chinna Timmanayudu. All three brothers would become "famous" in Vijayanagara history.

== Bibliography ==
- Sriramamurty, Y. (1964), "History of the Pemmasani Family", Journal of the Andhra Historical Society, Volume 30, Parts 1-4, Andhra Historical Research Society, pp. 89–104
- Sriramamurty, Y. (1973), "The Pemmasani Family" (PDF), Studies in the History of the Telugu country during the Vijayanagara period 1336 to 1650 A D, Karnatak University/Shodhganga, hdl:10603/107988
- Ramaswami, N.S (1975), Temples of Tadpatri, Govt. of Andhra Pradesh
