= Pemmasani Ramalinga Nayudu I =

Pemmasani Ramalinga Nayudu I was a member of the Pemmasani Nayak clan in the 15th century Vijayanagara Empire in southern India. He developed the hamlet of Tallapalle, renaming it to Tadipatri upon orders of the Vijayanagara emperor. He built a fort in the town and the Bugga Ramalingeswara Temple. Another temple to Obaleswara in Kurnool District is also attributed to him.

Ramalinga Nayudu used a considerable amount of government funds to build irrigation projects to irrigate paddy and ragi fields. Though Ramalinga developed Tadipatri, he also developed his ancestral estate consisting of Yadiki and its adjoining territories, which were previously governed by his father.

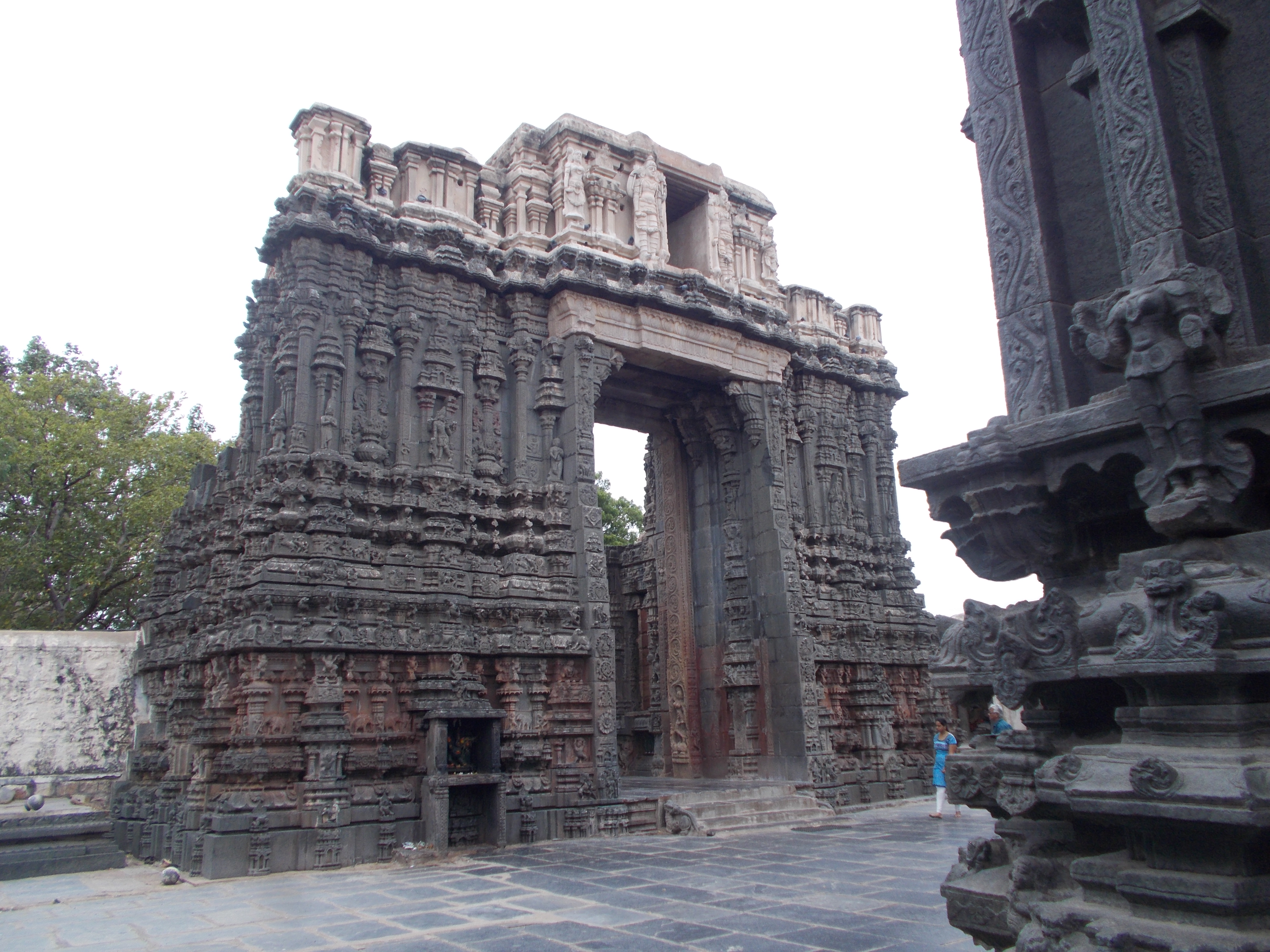
Temple Gopura of the Bugga Ramalingeswara Temple built by Pemmasani Ramalinga.

Ramalinga Nayudu was the son of Pemmasani Timma Nayudu. He had two daughters, Govindamma and Rajagopalamma, and a son, Timmanayudu II. His two daughters each constructed a village and temple. Govindamma built the town of Vatraketaya, and Rajagoplamma built Ramalinganayanipalle, which is named after Ramalinga. Timmanayudu II, Ramalinga's son, would succeed him after his death. The notable commander, Pemmasani Ramalinga Nayudu, is the grandson of Ramalinga I and the son of Timmanayudu II.

== Bibliography ==
- Sriramamurty, Y. (1964), "History of the Pemmasani Family", Journal of the Andhra Historical Society, Volume 30, Parts 1-4, Andhra Historical Research Society, pp. 89–104
  - Sriramamurty, Y. (1973), "The Pemmasani Family" (PDF), Studies in the History of the Telugu country during the Vijayanagara period 1336 to 1650 A D, Karnatak University/Shodhganga, hdl:10603/107988
- Ramaswami, N.S (1975), Temples of Tadpatri, Govt. of Andhra Pradesh
