= Pemmasani Timmanayudu I =

- Died: Yadiki
- Relatives: Pemmasani Ramalinga Nayudu Pemmasani Nayaks
- Military career
- Allegiance: Vijayanagara Empire

Pemmasani Timmanayudu I, also known as Thimma Nayudu, was the progenitor of the Pemmasani Nayaks, as per the kaifiyat of Tadipatri. The Pemmasani migrated from Telugu regions to serve the Vijayanagara Empire militarily.

Pemmasani Timmanayudu first entered into the service of the Vijayanagara Empire as the keeper of the royal pigeons. Praudha Devaraya (Devaraya II) sent Timmanayudu I to Yadiki, where Timmanayudu constructed a fort with four bastions. Moreover, Timmanayudu built one temple for Veerabhadra and one temple for Ganapati because their idols were found during the construction of the Yadiki Fort.

Pemmasani Timmanayudu I administered Yadiki and its adjoining territory for sometime. He died there and was succeeded by his son, Ramalinganayudu I.

== See also ==
- Devaraya II
- Pemmasani Nayaks
- Pemmasani Ramalinga Nayudu

== Bibliography ==
- Sriramamurty, Y. (1964), "History of the Pemmasani Family", Journal of the Andhra Historical Society, Volume 30, Parts 1-4, Andhra Historical Research Society, pp. 89–104
  - Sriramamurty, Y. (1973), "The Pemmasani Family" (PDF), Studies in the History of the Telugu country during the Vijayanagara period 1336 to 1650 A D, Karnatak University/Shodhganga, hdl:10603/107988
- Wagoner, Phillip B. (1993), Tidings of the king: a translation and ethnohistorical analysis of the Rāyavācakamu, University of Hawaii Press, ISBN 978-0-8248-1495-3
