= Chintalarayaswami Temple =

- శ్రీ చింతల వెంకటరమణ దేవాలయం
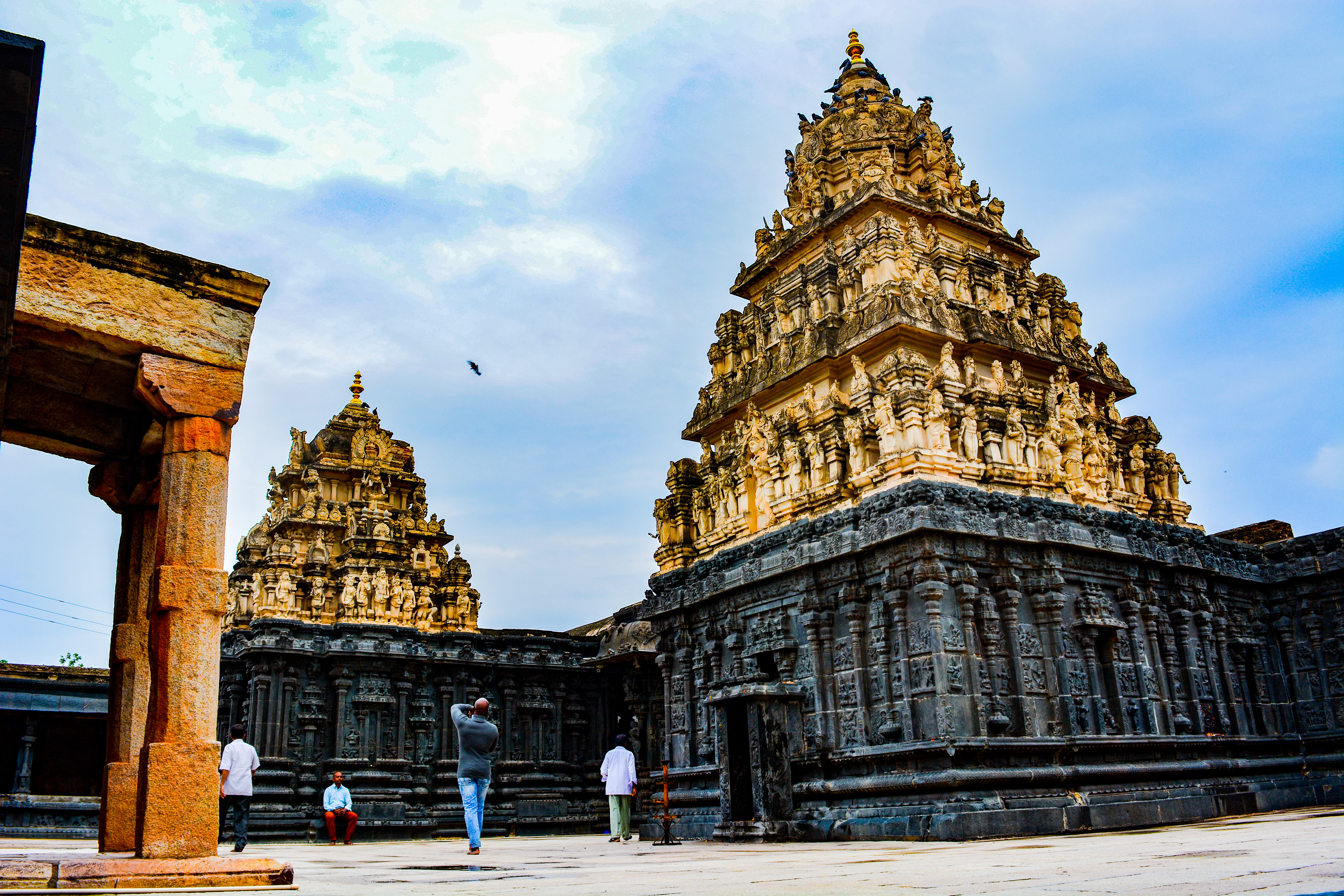

Religion
- Affiliation: Hinduism
- District: Anantapur District
- Deity: Lord Venkateswara

Location
- Location: Tadipatri
- State: Andhra Pradesh
- Country: India
- Interactive map of Chintalarayaswami Temple

Chintalarayaswamy Temple or Sri Chintala Venkataramana Temple is a Hindu Vaishnavite temple situated in Tadipatri, a town in the Anantapur District of Andhra Pradesh, India. The Temple is dedicated to Venkateswara, a form of Vishnu, who is referred to as Chintala Venkataramana. The temple was built by Pemmasani Timmanayudu II of the Pemmasani Nayaks. It is situated on the bank of the Penna River, which passes through the town. The temple has granite sculptures and is classified as one of the Monuments of National Importance by Archaeological Survey of India (ASI). The temple has a Garuda Mandapa built as a chariot with rotating granite wheels, which is similar to the one found in the Vithala Temple of Hampi.

== Etymology ==
According to legend, the presiding deity Venkateswara was found in the Tamarind (Telugu: Chinta) tree and hence got the name Chintala Venkataramana.

== History ==
The Temple was built during the reign of Vijayanagara Empire in mid 16th Century by Pemmasani Timmanayudu II, a contemporary of Vira Narasimharaya and Krishnadevaraya. Timmanayudu built this temple after Vishnu is said to have told Timmanayudu in a dream that a temple should be constructed for him at Tadipatri. Timmanayudu appointed two archakas and a chief-priest, and he gifted lands to the temple. The Chintalarayaswamy Temple is considered one of the finest examples of Vijayanagara architecture. The initial structure may belong to the Saluva dynasty, but the entrance towers belongs to the Tuluva dynasty.

The temple was built in the Dravidian style.

== Gallery ==
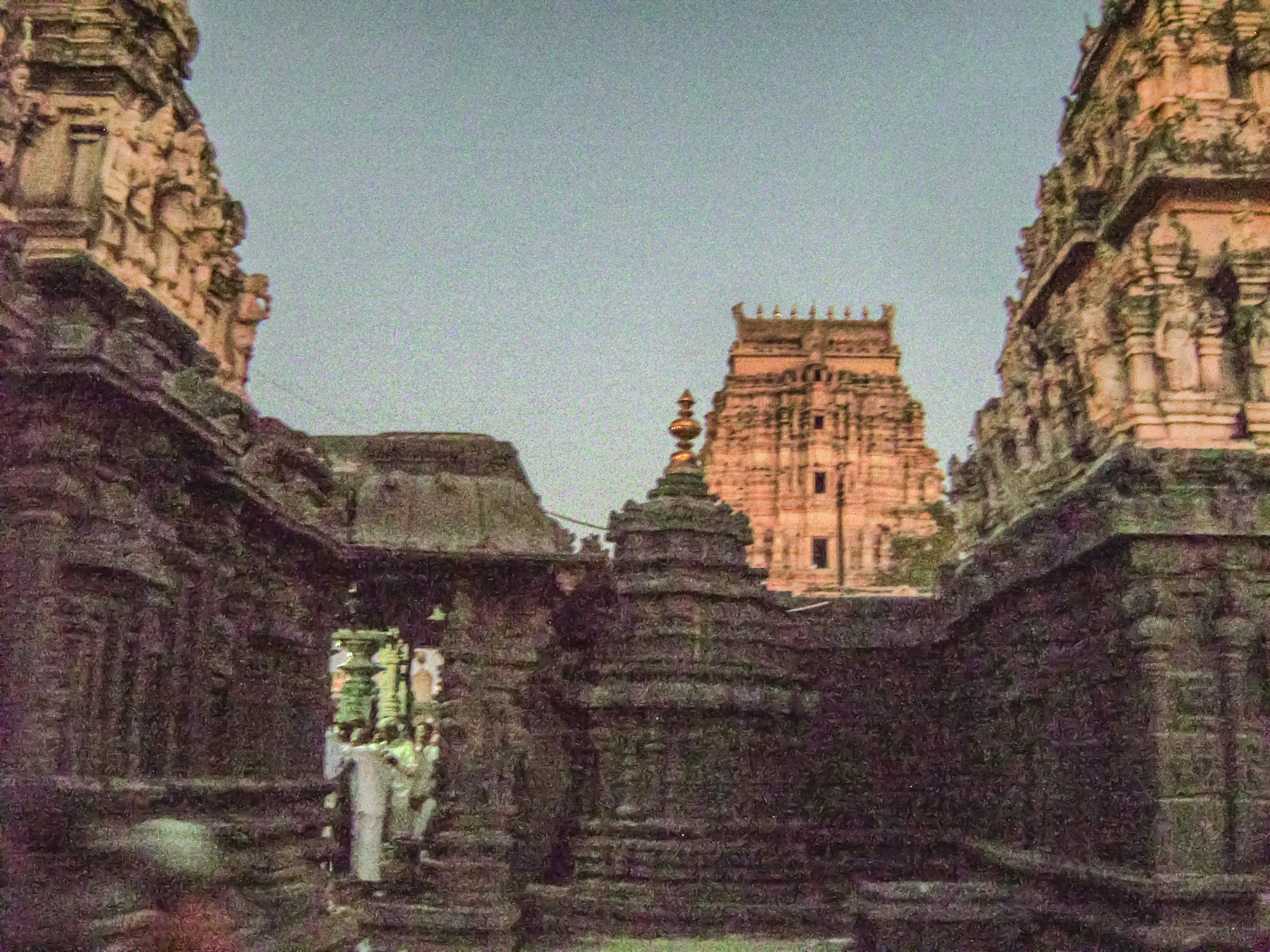
Chintalaraya Temple with Vimanams

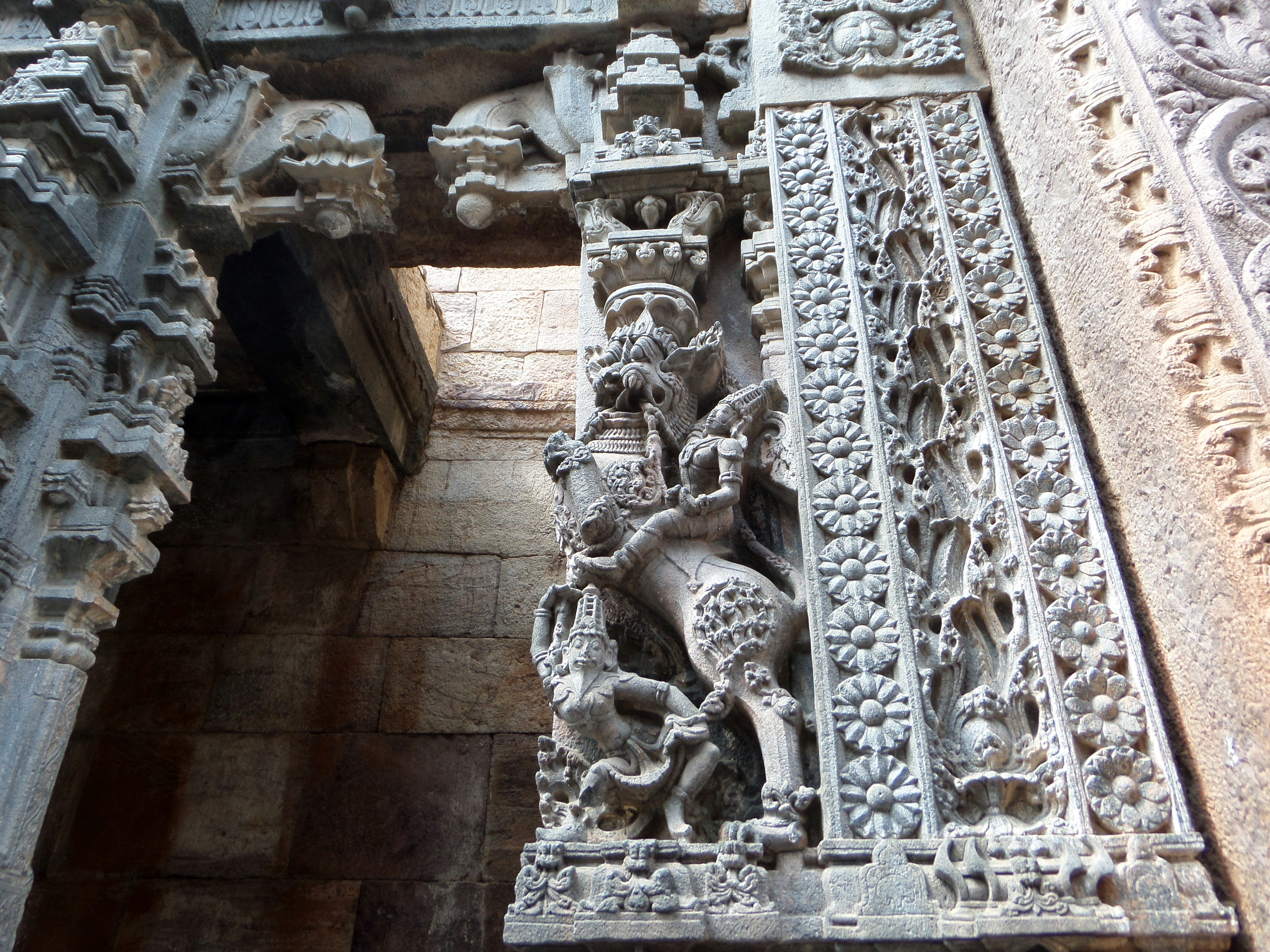
A huge pillar with a person riding the Yali

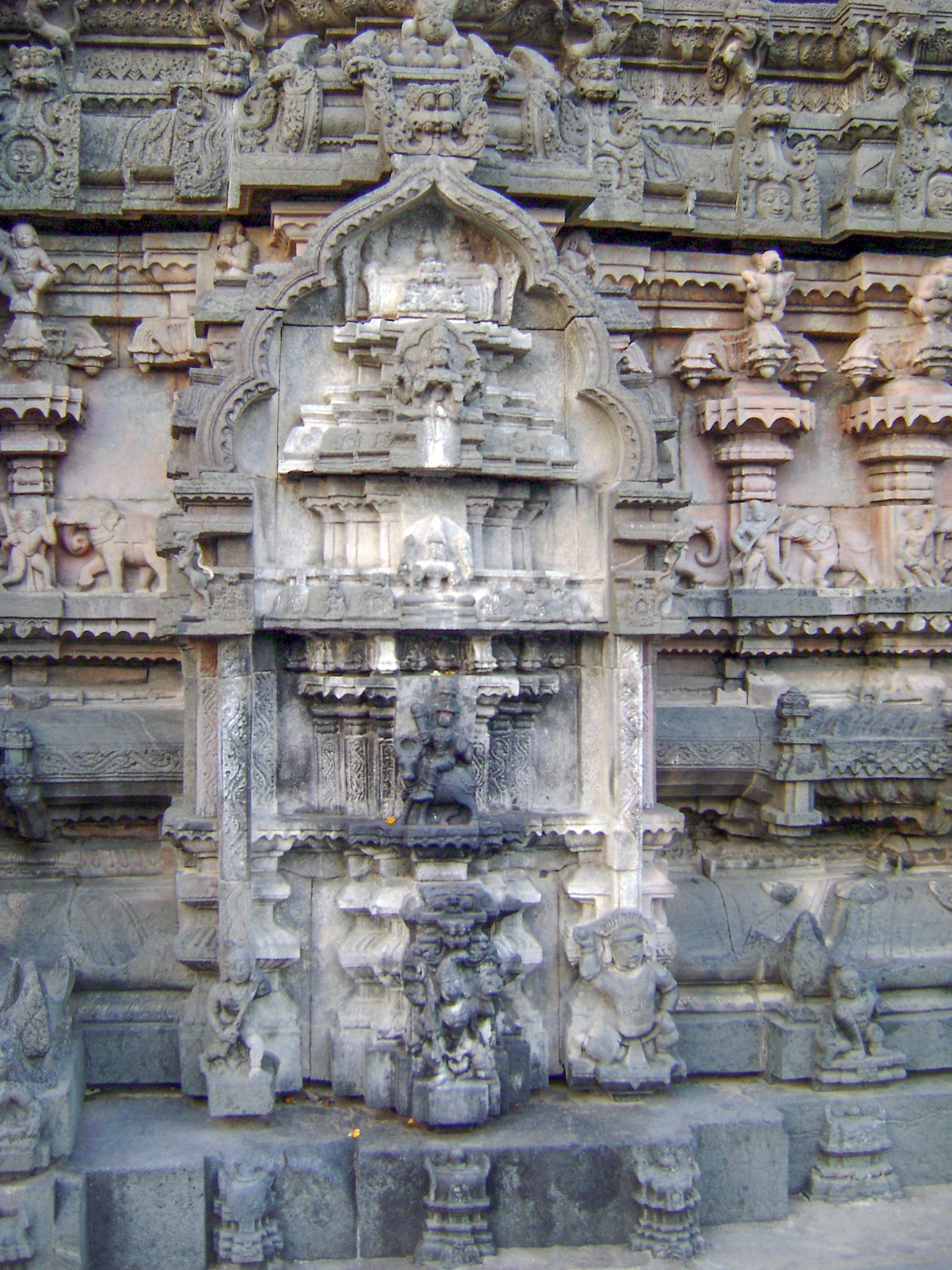
A wall with sculptures

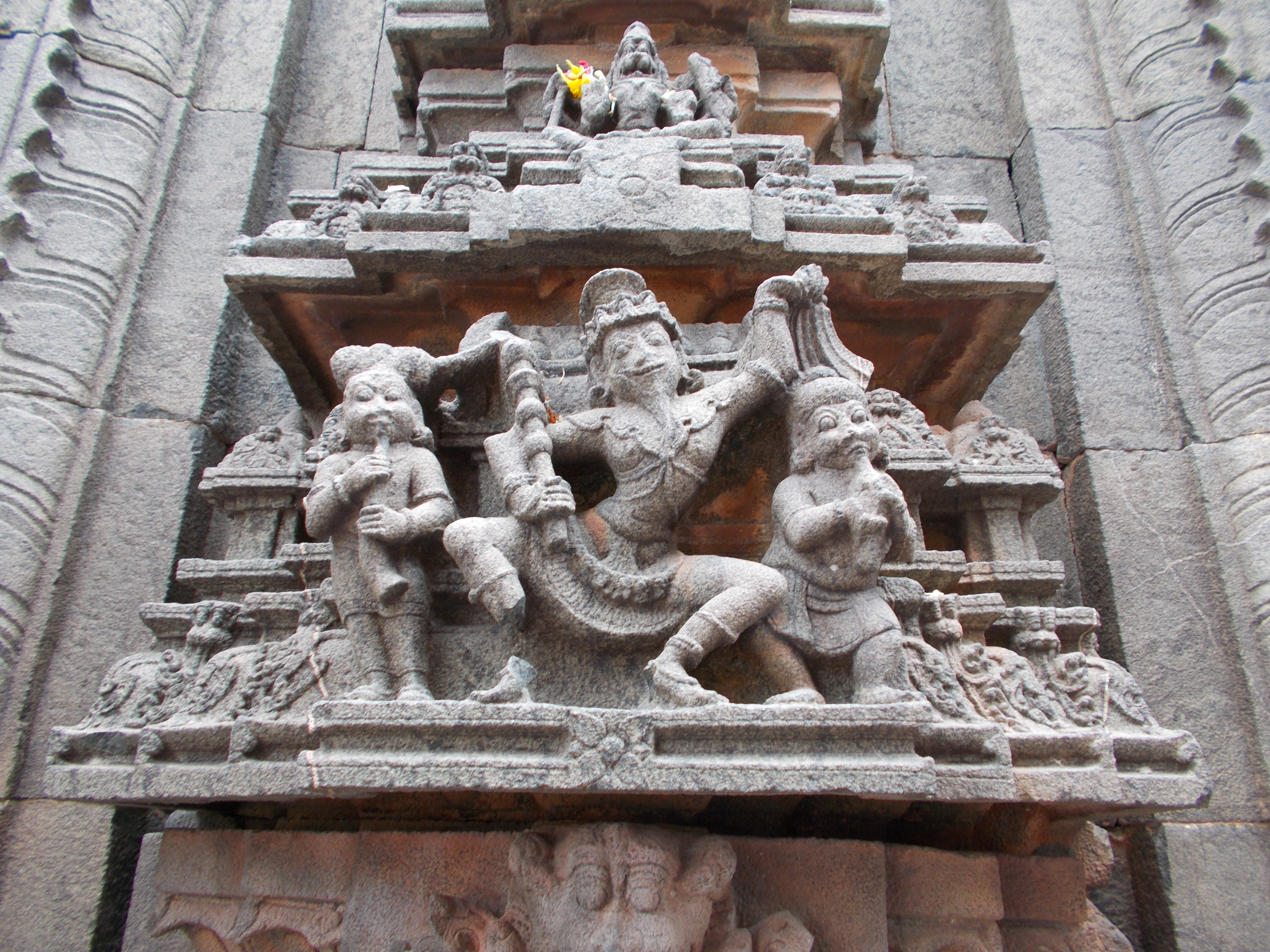
Nartaka Mudra

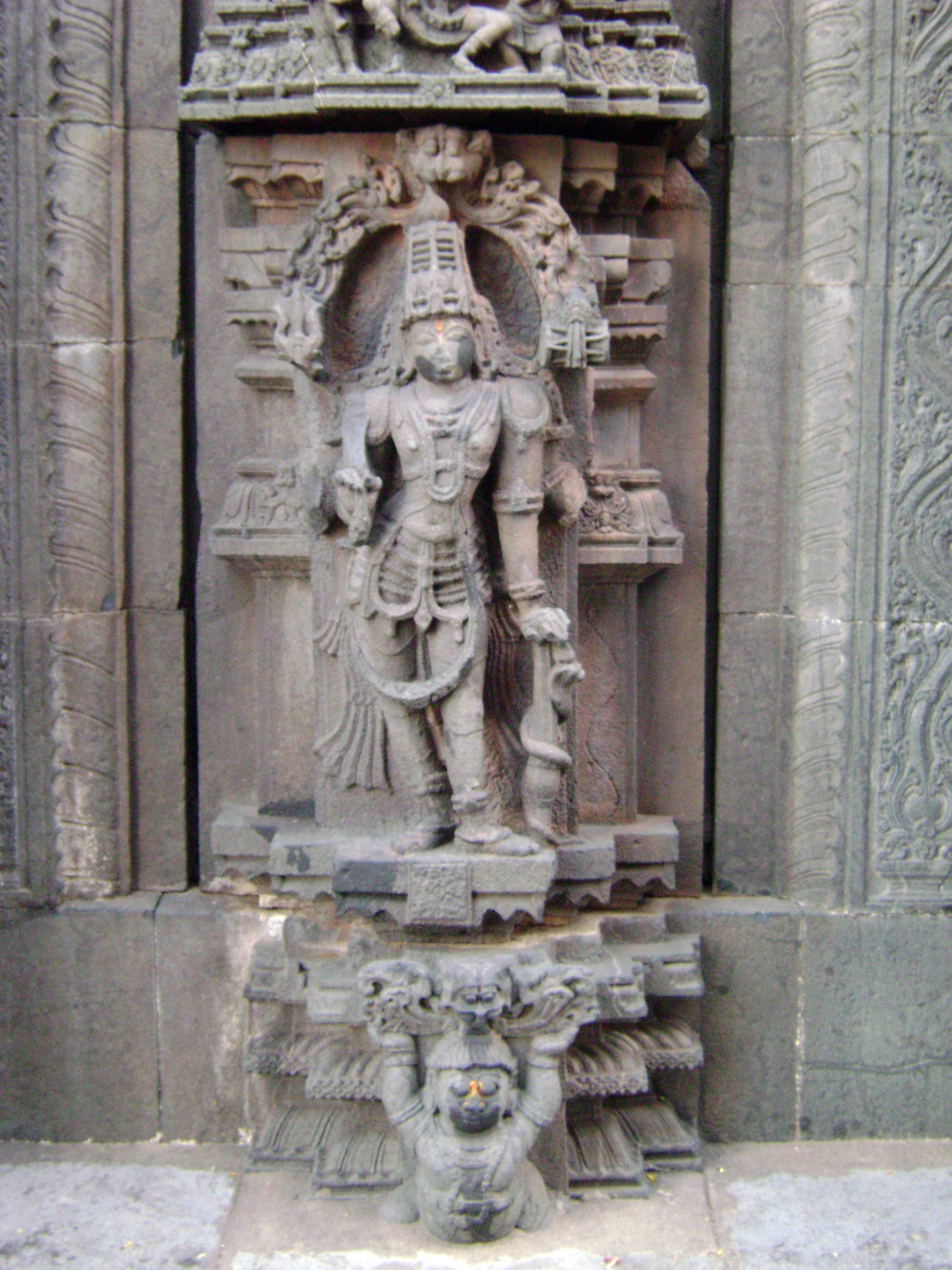
A idol depicting deity

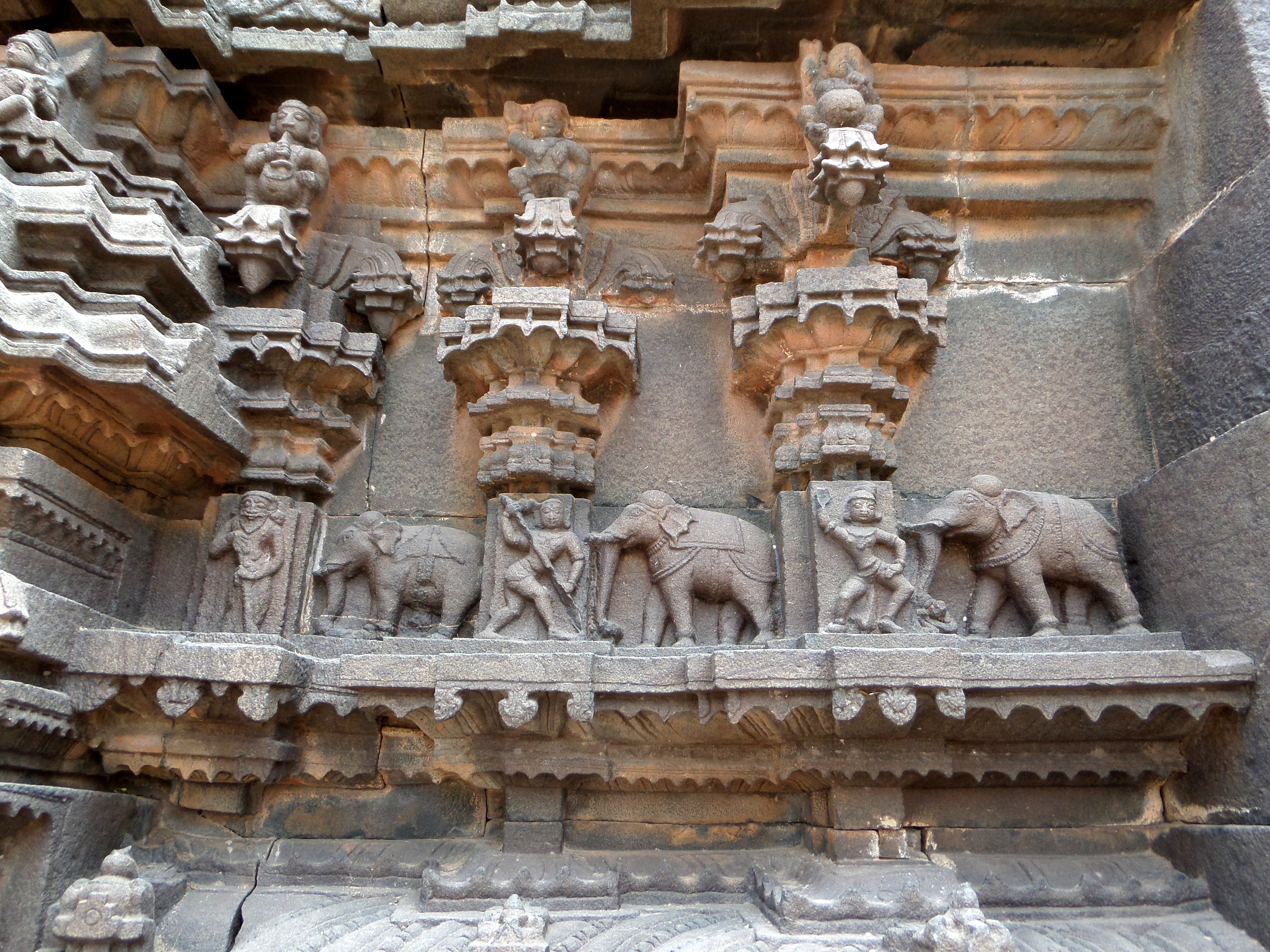
Elephants

== See also ==
- Bugga Ramalingeswara Swamy temple
- Temples of Andhra Pradesh
