= Tadipatri mandal =

Mandal in Andhra Pradesh, India

- Mandal
- Interactive Map Outlining mandal
- Location in Andhra Pradesh, India
- Coordinates: 14.9069°N 78.0098°E
- Country: India
- State: Andhra Pradesh
- District: Anantapur
- Headquarters: Tadipatri

Area
  - Total: 116.85 km^{2} (45.12 sq mi)

Population (2011)
  - Total: 165,872
  - Density: 1,419.5/km^{2} (3,676.6/sq mi)

Languages
  - Official: Telugu
- Time zone: UTC+5:30 (IST)

Tadipatri mandal or Tadpatri mandal is one of the 31 mandals in Anantapur district of the state of Andhra Pradesh in India. It is under the administration of Ananthapuramu revenue division and the headquarters are located at Tadipatri town.

== Demographics ==
As of the 2011 Census of India, Tadipatri mandal comprises 39,970 households. The total population is 1,65,872, with 83,197 males and 82,675 females. The child population is 18,440. Scheduled Castes constitute 22,861 of the population, while Scheduled Tribes account for 2,653 individuals. The number of literate individuals stands at 1,00,094. The workforce in Tadipatri mandal includes 73,119 workers.

== Villages ==
List of villages/settlements in Tadipatri mandal

1. Alur
2. Bhogasamudram
3. Bodaipalle
4. Bondaladinne
5. Brahmanapalle
6. Challavaripalle
7. Chinnapolamada
8. Chukkalur
9. Diguvapalle
10. Gangadevipalle
11. Husenapuram
12. Igudur
13. Jambulapadu
14. Kaverisamudram
15. Komali
16. Nandalapadu (R)
17. Peddapolamada
18. Puliproddatur
19. Sajjaladinne
20. Seetharampuram
21. Tadipatri (R)
22. Talaricheruvu
23. Uruchinthala
24. Vanganur
25. Veerapuram
26. Velamakur
27. Venkatampalle
