= Kuruvikulam =

- panchayat Taulk
- Location in Tamil Nadu, India Kuruvikulam (India)
- Coordinates: 9.18°N 77.67°E
- Country: India
- State: Tamil Nadu
- District: Tenkasi

Languages
  - Official: Tamil
- Time zone: UTC+5:30 (IST)

Kuruvikulam is a panchayat in Kuruvikulam Block, Thiruvenkatam taluk, Tenkasi district in southern Tamil Nadu.
