= Pemmasani Ramalinga Nayudu =

- Born: Gandikota
- Relatives: Pemmasani Nayaks
- Military career
- Allegiance: Vijayanagara Empire
- Rank: Amara Nayaka
- Conflicts: Battle with the Turks (1509–10); Battle of Raichur; Battle of Krishna River; Capture of Pangal; Capture of Ganpura; Siege of Gulbarga; Battle of Juturu; Battle of Bedkalluu; Battle of Betamcherla; Battle of Adoni

Pemmasani Ramalinga Nayudu was a vassal and military commander in the service of the Vijayanagara Empire. An inscription dated to 1544 CE, discovered in Tallaproddatur, indicates that Ramalinga Nayudu held the nayankara (feudal jurisdiction) over that village.

Historical sources suggest that Ramalinga Nayudu belonged to the prominent Pemmasani family, which played a significant role in governing the region of Gandikota during the 16th century. The 17th-century Telugu text Rayavachakamu, analyzed by historian Phillip B. Wagoner, references Ramalinga Nayudu but does not clarify whether he served under Krishnadevaraya or a subsequent ruler from the Aravidu dynasty.

Ramalinga was named as a commander and 'chief general' of the Vijayanagara emperor Krishnadevaraya (r. 1509–1529) in Rayavachakamu, and a later poetic rendition Krishnarajavijayam. According to Rayavachakamu, he was an army commander of a Vijayanagara military unit comprising nearly 80,000 soldiers. He was mentioned as a commander for the Vijayanagara king Krishnadevaraya at a certain 'Battle with the Turks'. Historian Venkataramanayya identified the battle as the one fought at Devni or Dewani (unidentified) in 1509–1510, within a year of Krishnadevaraya's accession. But some elements of the narrative are also reminiscent of the Battle of Raichur in 1520. Ramalinga is said to have played a crucial role in winning the battle against combined armies of Kalburgie, Golconda and Ahmednagar for Krishnadevaraya. Krishnadevaraya honoured him with gold threaded clothes and jewels following this victory.

He was the son of Pemmasani Timmanayudu II and Machamma. The Pemmasani Nayaks were a martial clan. During the Aravidu Dynasty of the Vijayanagara Empire, the Pemmasanis were in prominence as the chieftains of Gandikota sima and ministers at the Vijayanagara court. Burton Stein relays that the Pemmasanis controlled numerous small villages and many large towns and had large mercenary armies that were the vanguard of the Vijayanagara Empire in the sixteenth century.

Ramalinga and his brother, Erra Timmanayudu, fought and won various battles for Rama Raya, including the Battle of Juturu, Battle of Betamcherla, Battle of Bedakallu, and Battle of Adoni. It was mainly with their cooperation that Rama Raya won the succession conflict following the death of Achyuta Devaraya against Salakaraju Tirumala.

== See also ==
- Pemmasani Nayaks
- Pemmasani Timma Nayaka
- Battle of Raichur

== Bibliography ==
- Stein, Burton (1989), The New Cambridge History of India: Vijayanagara, Cambridge University Press, ISBN 978-0-521-26693-2
- Sriramamurty, Y. (1964), "History of the Pemmasani Family", Journal of the Andhra Historical Society, Volume 30, Parts 1-4, Andhra Historical Research Society, pp. 89–104
  - Sriramamurty, Y. (1973), "The Pemmasani Family" (PDF), Studies in the History of the Telugu country during the Vijayanagara period 1336 to 1650 A D, Karnatak University/Shodhganga, hdl:10603/107988
- Wagoner, Phillip B. (1993), Tidings of the king: a translation and ethnohistorical analysis of the Rāyavācakamu, University of Hawaii Press, ISBN 978-0-8248-1495-3
