= Bugga Ramalingeswara Swamy Temple =

Hindu temple in India

Coordinates: 14.9184°N 78.0101°E

- బుగ్గరామలింగేశ్వర స్వామి ఆలయం
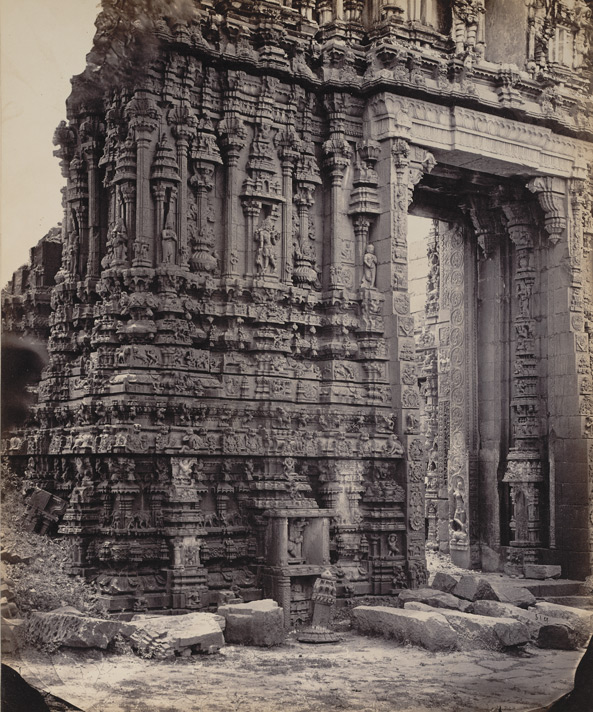
- Bugga Ramalingeswara Temple, photographed c. 1868 by Edmund David Lyon

- Location within Andhra Pradesh

Religion
- Affiliation: Hinduism
- District: Anantapur district
- Deity: Lord Shiva

Location
- Location: Tadipatri
- State: Andhra Pradesh
- Country: India
- Interactive map of Bugga Ramalingeswara Swamy Temple

Architecture
- Completed: Between 1490 and 1525

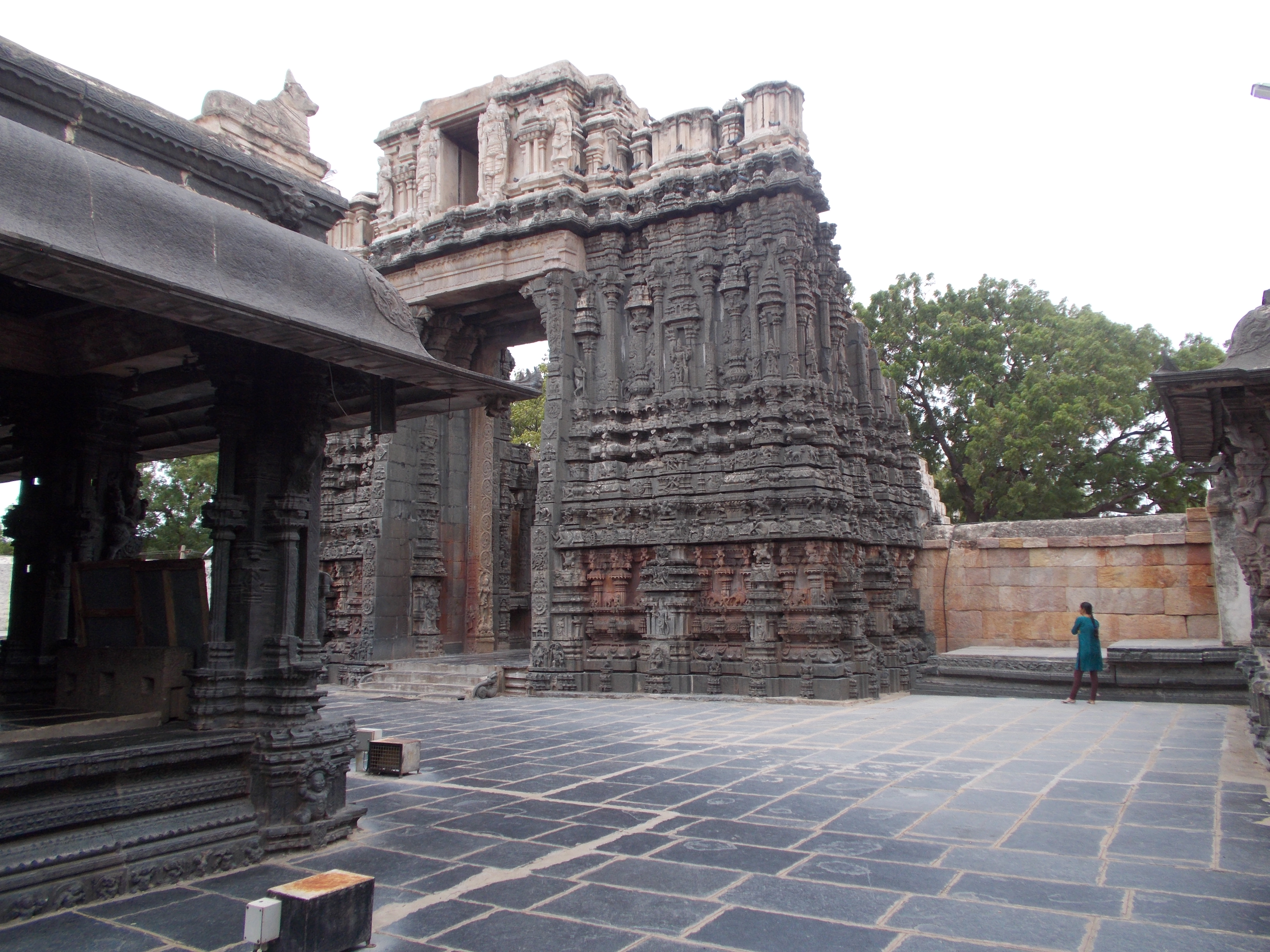
Musical pillars and the main unfinished gopuram

Bugga Ramalingeswara Swamy Temple (Telugu: బుగ్గరామలింగేశ్వర స్వామి ఆలయం) is a Shiva shrine situated on the southern bank of the Penna River in Tadipatri, Anantapur district of Andhra Pradesh, India. It was built between 1490 and 1509 by Pemmasani Ramalinga Nayudu I, a chieftain of the Gutti-Gandikota region during the reign of the Vijayanagara Empire.

The presiding deity is a linga, considered to be ‘swayambhu’ (naturally occurring or self originated). The temple has seven small independent pillars in front of the Vishnu shrine and when struck they produce 'saptaswara' (the seven musical notes). The gopurams of the temple are unfinished and were described by architectural historian James Anderson as ‘wonders’.

== Description ==
The Bugga Ramalingeswara Swamy Temple is 4 km (2.5 mi) from Tadipatri railway station. It was probably built between 1490 and 1509 under the area of the Vijayanagara Empire. As per the Tadipatri kaifiyat collected by Colin Mackenzie in 1802, the temple was built by Ramalinga Nayudu, a chieftain of the Gutti-Gandikota rule in Vijayanagara Empire.

The temple consists of a sanctum, ardhmandapa, and mukhamandapa in an axial line. The temple contains bas relief structures illustrating episodes from Ramayana and Mahabharata. The presiding deity (linga) being a ‘swayambhu’ (naturally occurring or self originated). Unlike other Hindu temples where the deities are east-facing, in this temple the Shiva linga faces west. When struck, the seven pillars in front of the Vishnu shrine produce 'saptaswara' (a musical scale).

The architectural historian James Anderson described the gopurams of this temple as ‘wonders’.

== Gallery ==
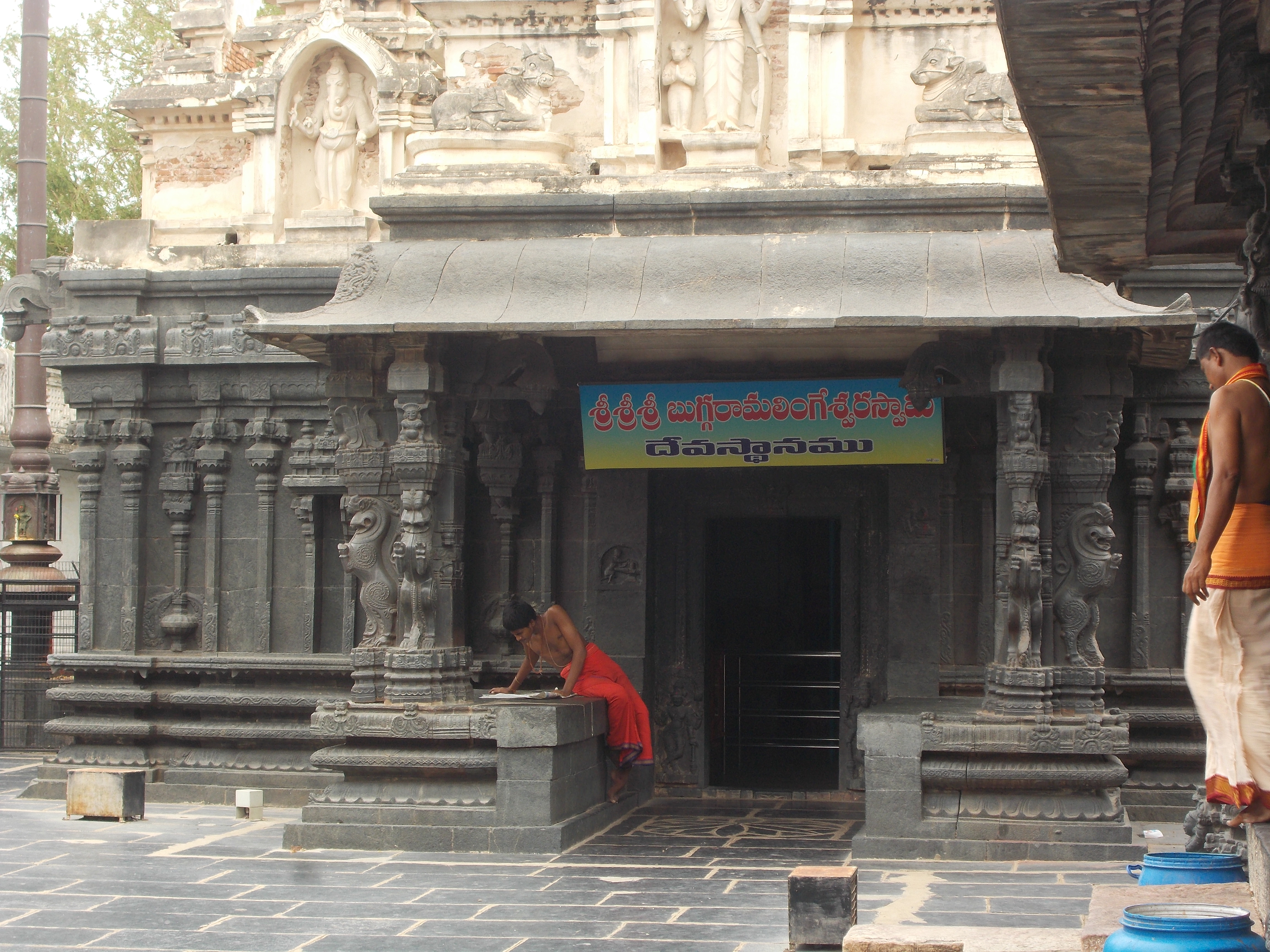
Entrance to Garbhagudi

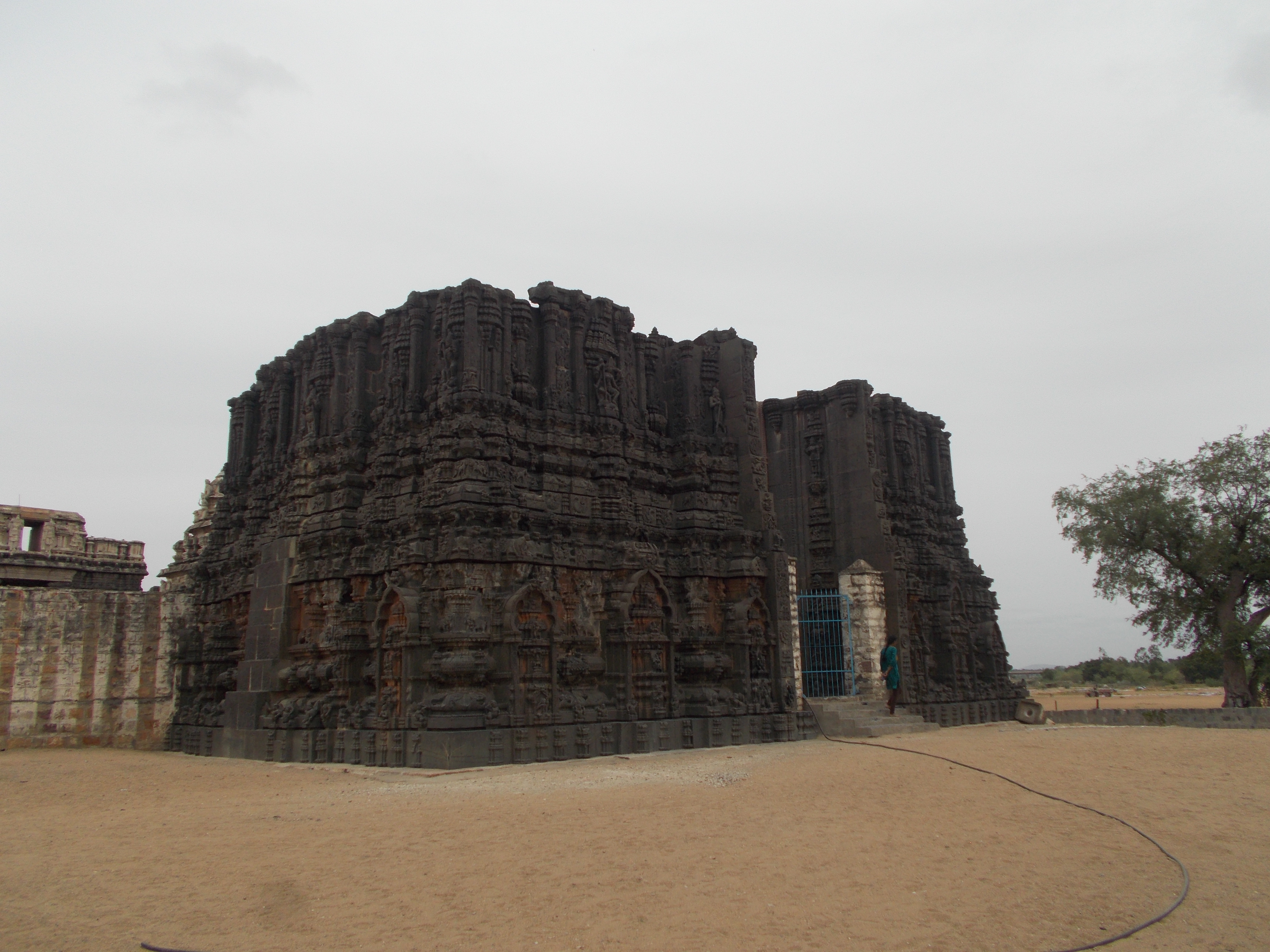
Unfinished gopuram

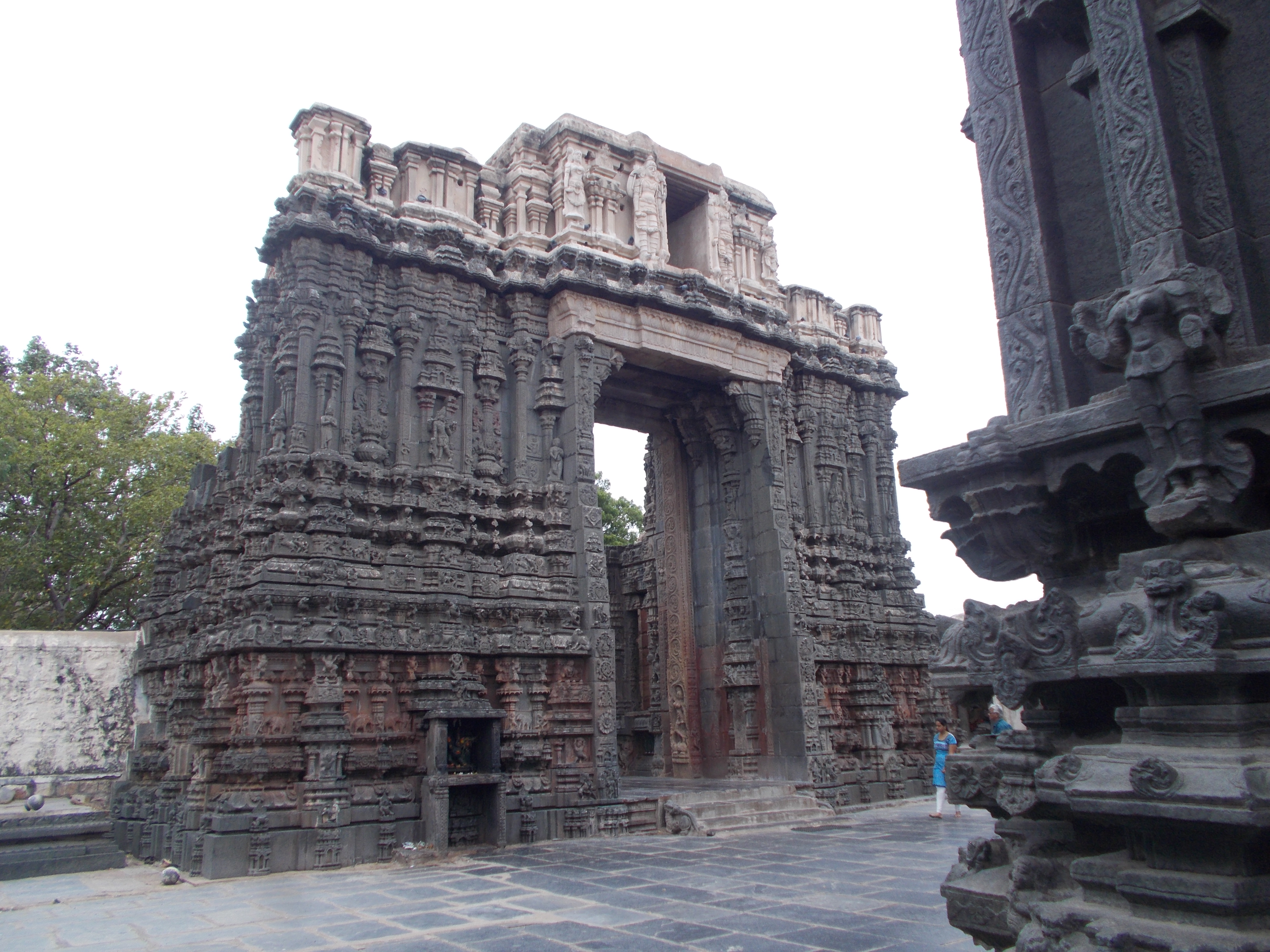
Unfinished gopuram

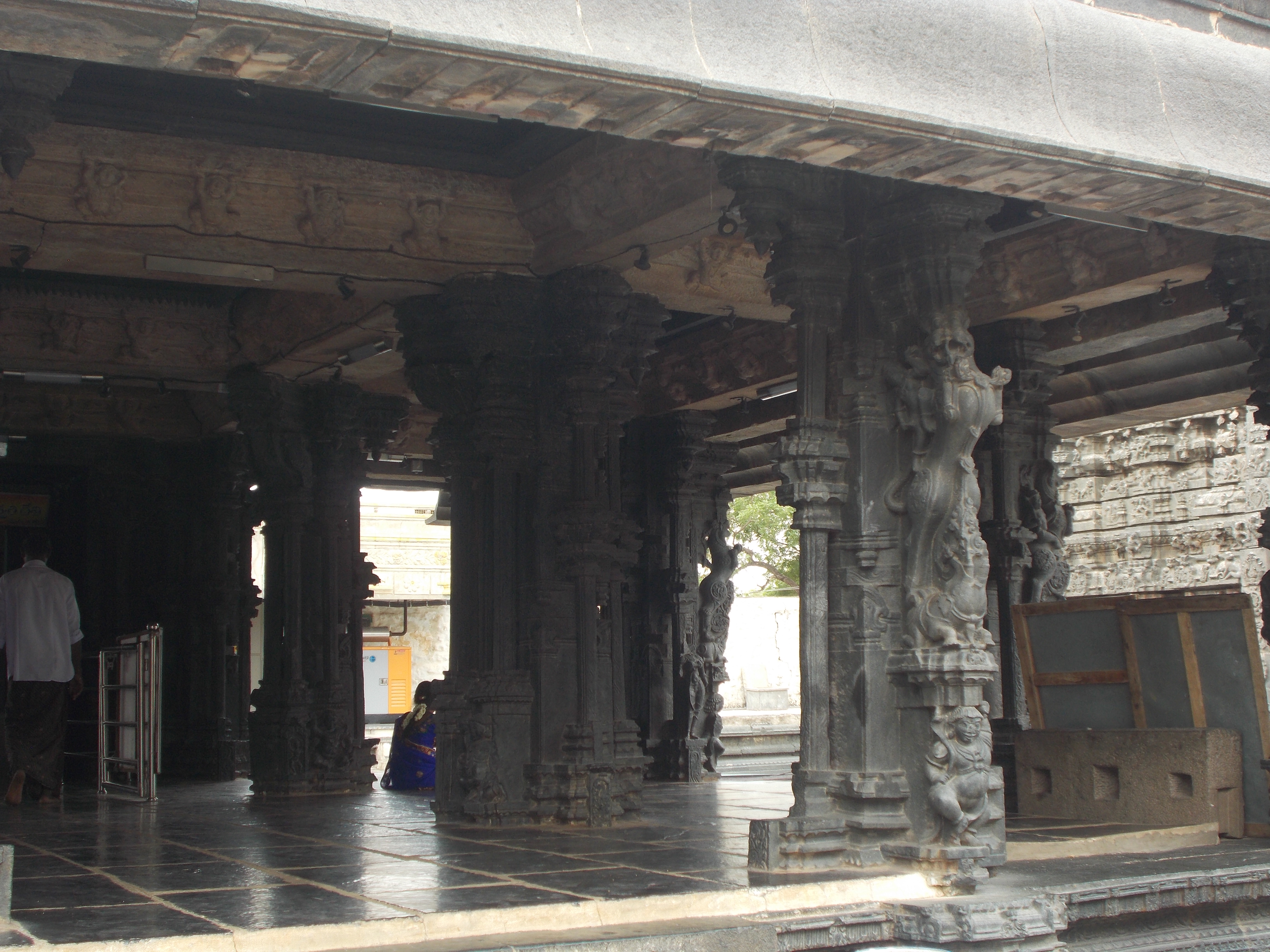
Musical pillars

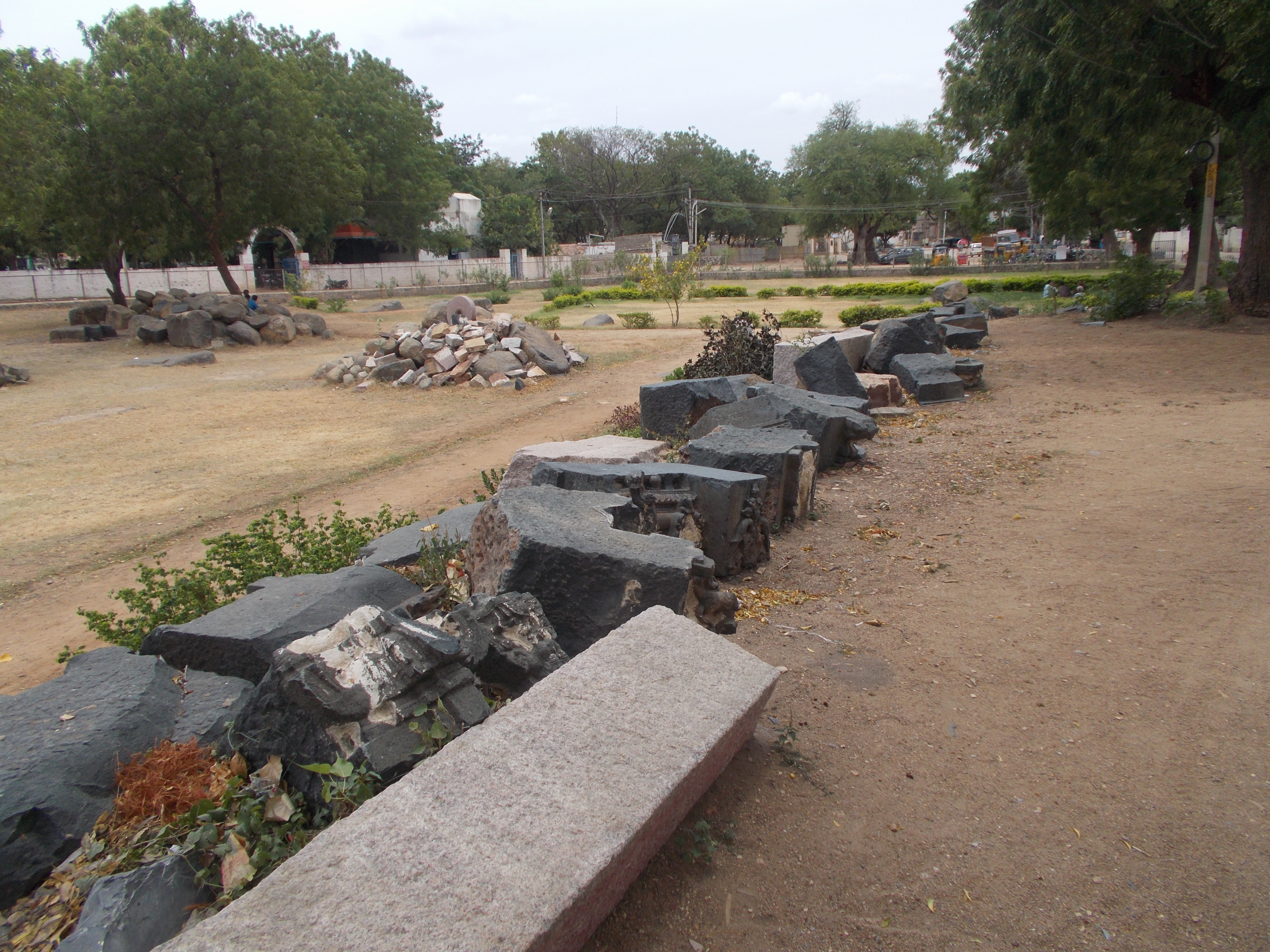
Rocks used for construction

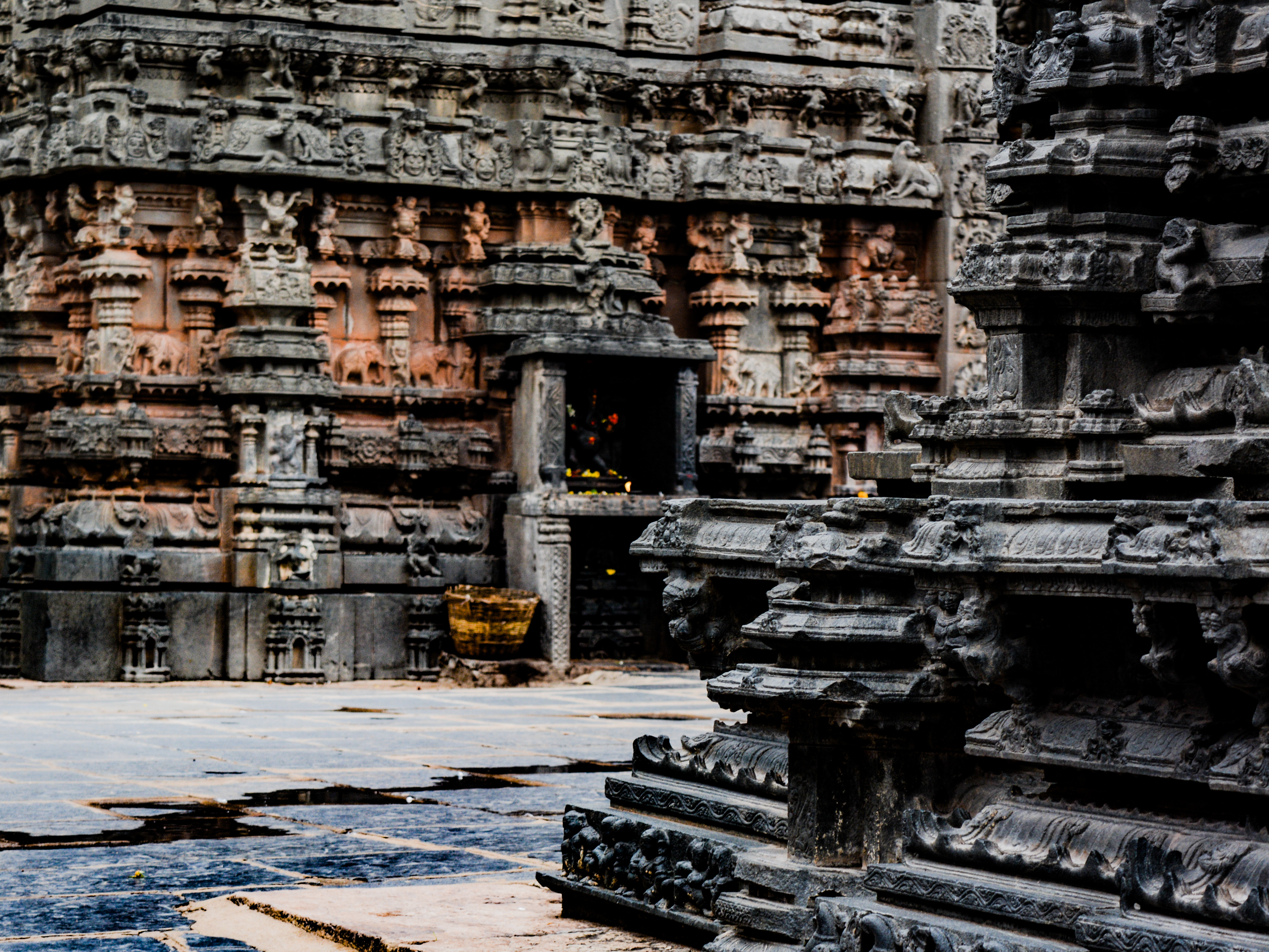
Inside the temple

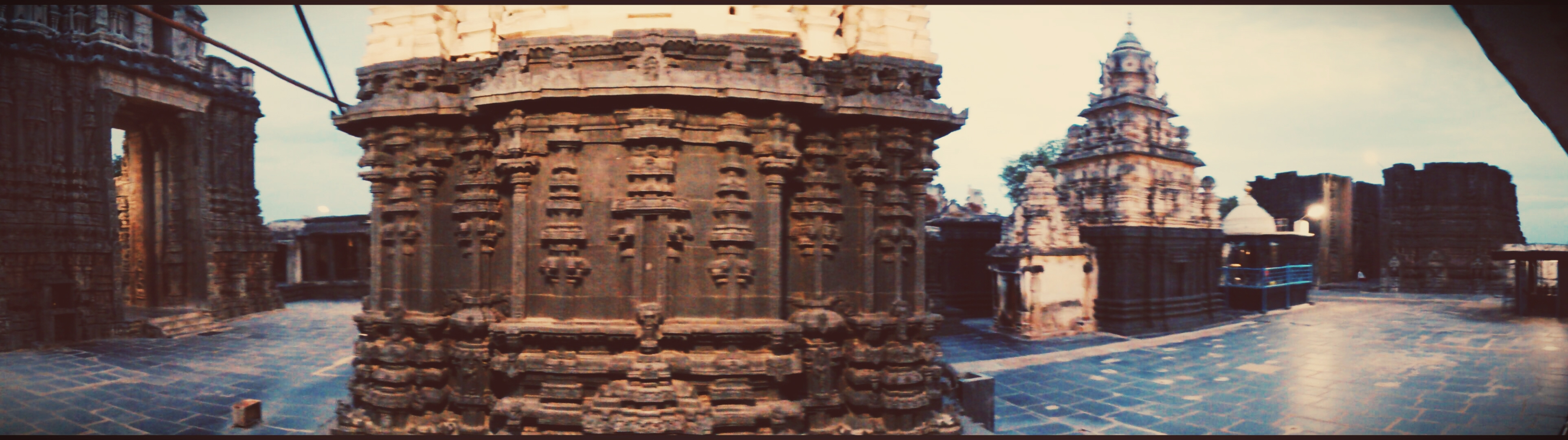
Panoramic view of the temple

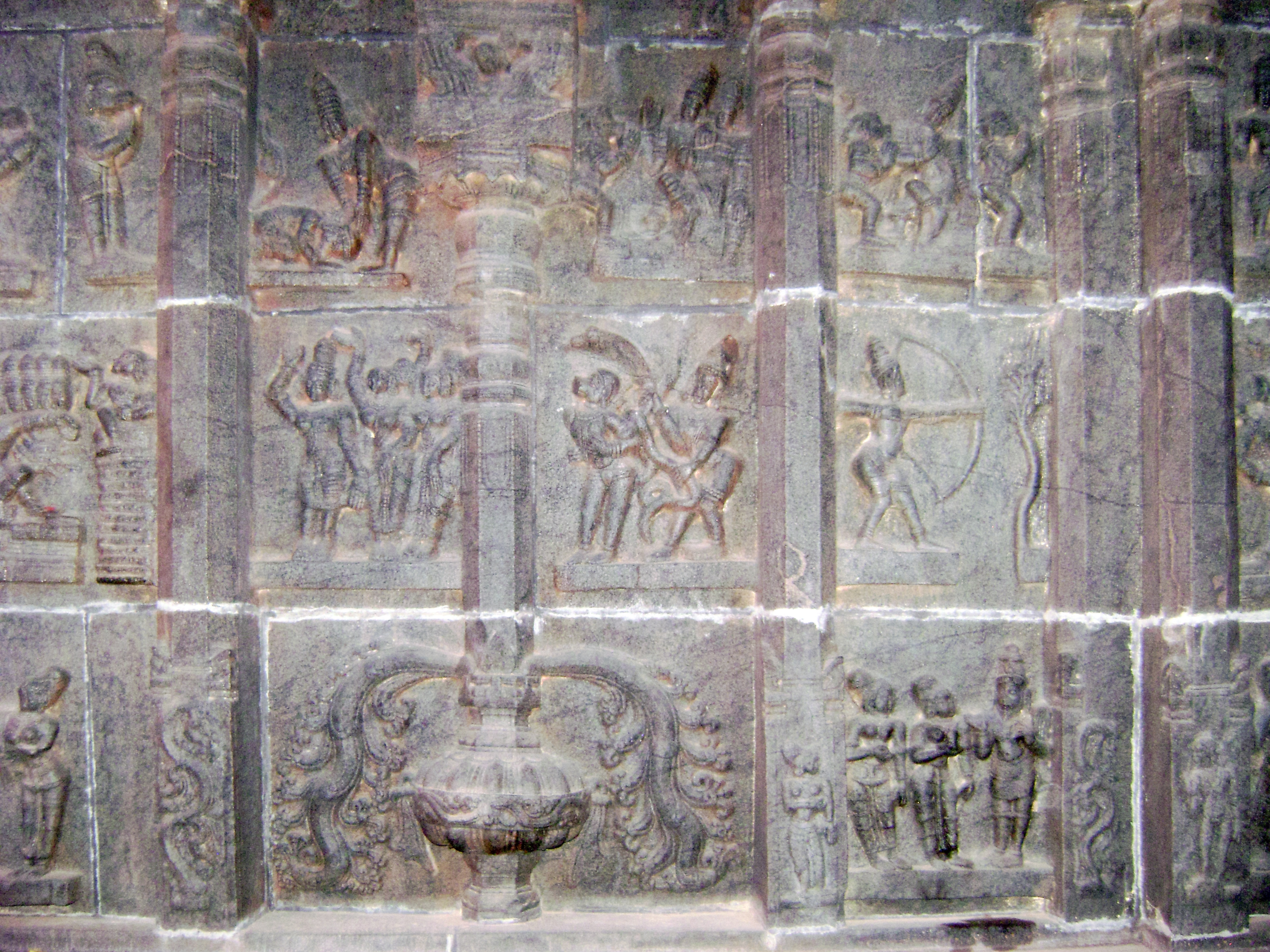
Temple carvings
