= Tadipatri =

- Town
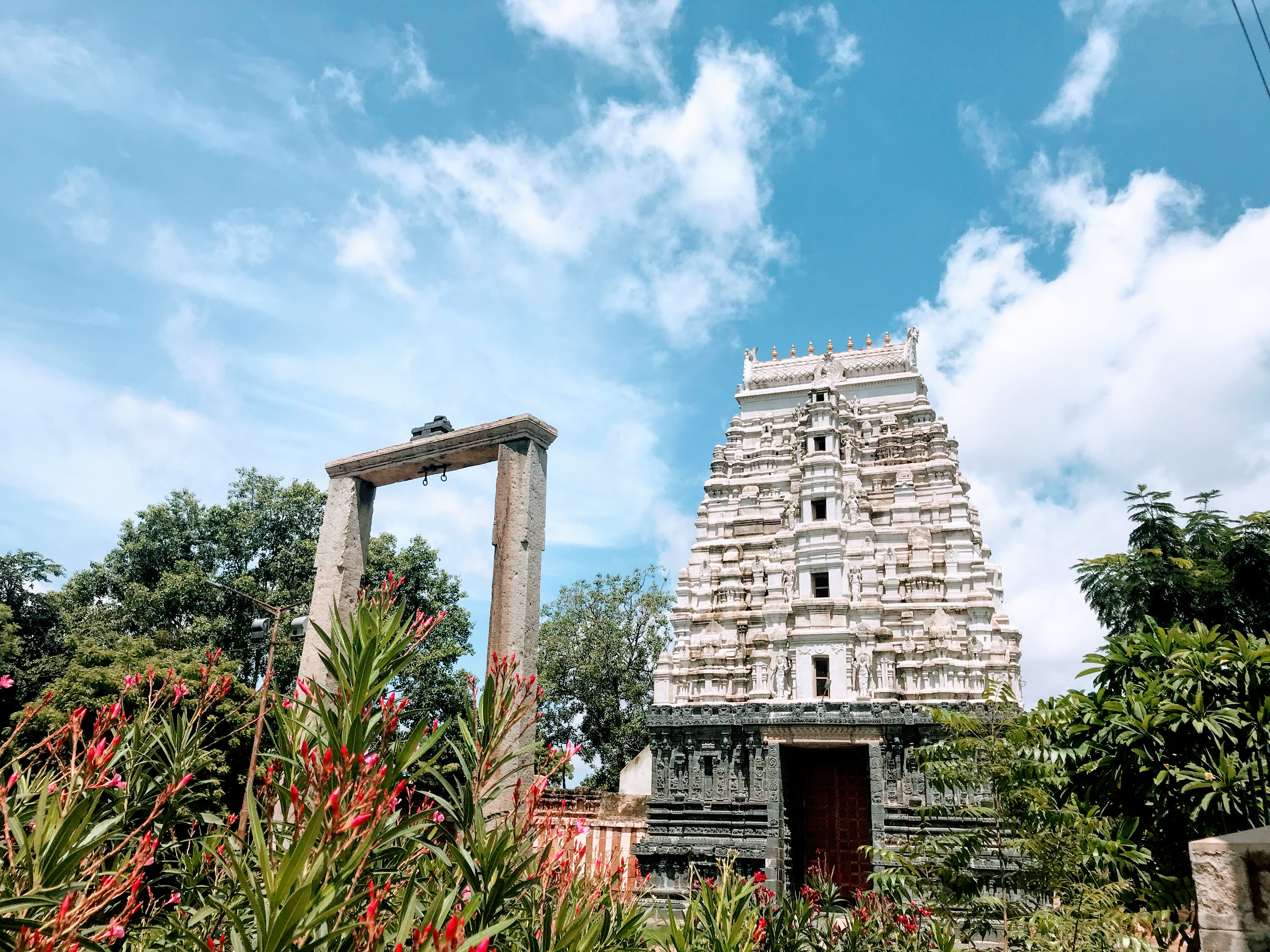
- Tadipatri - Sri Chintala Venkataramana Temple
- Nickname: Tadpatri
- Location in Andhra Pradesh, India
- Coordinates: 14.92°N 78.02°E
- Country: India
- State: Andhra Pradesh
- District: Anantapur

Area
  - Total: 7.46 km^{2} (2.88 sq mi)
  - Rank: 28
- Elevation: 229 m (751 ft)

Population (2021)
  - Total: 178,171
  - Rank: 28
  - Density: 23,900/km^{2} (61,900/sq mi)

Languages
  - Official: Telugu
- Time zone: UTC+5:30 (IST)
- PIN: 515411
- ISO 3166 code: IN-AP
- Vehicle registration: AP - 02
- Website: tadipatri.cdma.ap.gov.in/en

Tadipatri is a town in Anantapur district of the Indian state of Andhra Pradesh at the border of Nandyala district and Kadapa district. It is a Selection Grade Municipality City Council. Tadipatri is a headquarters of Tadipatri mandal in Ananthapuramu revenue division. The Chintala Venkataramana Temple is located on a five-acre site in Tadipatri. The Bugga Ramalingeswara Temple is located one kilometer from the city, overlooking the Penna River.

== Etymology ==
Tadipatri city’s name originated from Tallapalle. It was developed and renamed as Tadipatri by Pemmasani Ramalinga Nayudu I of the Pemmasani Nayaks, who made this city his seat of government and later developed as a major city in Anantapur district.

== Geography ==
Tadipatri is located at 14.92°N 78.02°E. Its average elevation is 223 metres or 731 feet. Tadipatri lies on the southern bank of Pennar River. Due to Mid Pennar Dam constructed upstream, the section of river in Tadipatri is usually dry throughout the year. Tadipatri is rich in cement grade limestone deposits. The limestone reserves are extending in a triangle from Tadipatri in Anantapur district to Kamalapuram in Kadapa district and Bethamcherla in Kurnool district.

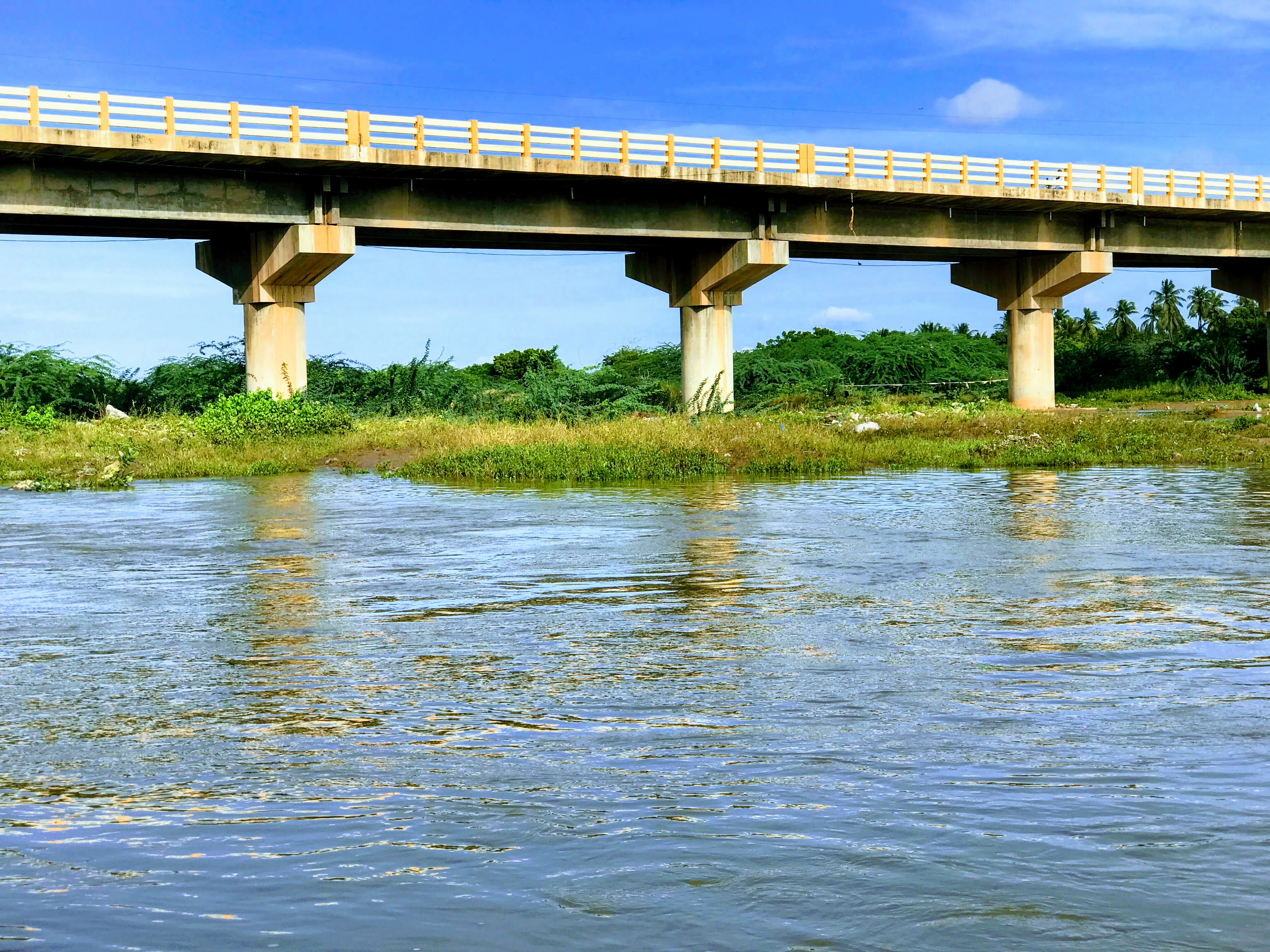
Penna River - Tadipatri

The rocks in Tadipatri area are part of the Lower Cuddapah Supergroup. It consists of dolomite, limestone and shale.

== Demographics ==
As of 2011 Census of India, Tadpatri had a population of 108,171.

== Governance ==
=== Civic Administration ===
New Municipal Office of Tadipatri

Tadipatri municipality is the civic body of the city. It is a so-called first-grade municipality, constituted in 1920. It is spread over an area of 7.46 km^{2} (2.88 mi^{2}) and has 36 election wards.

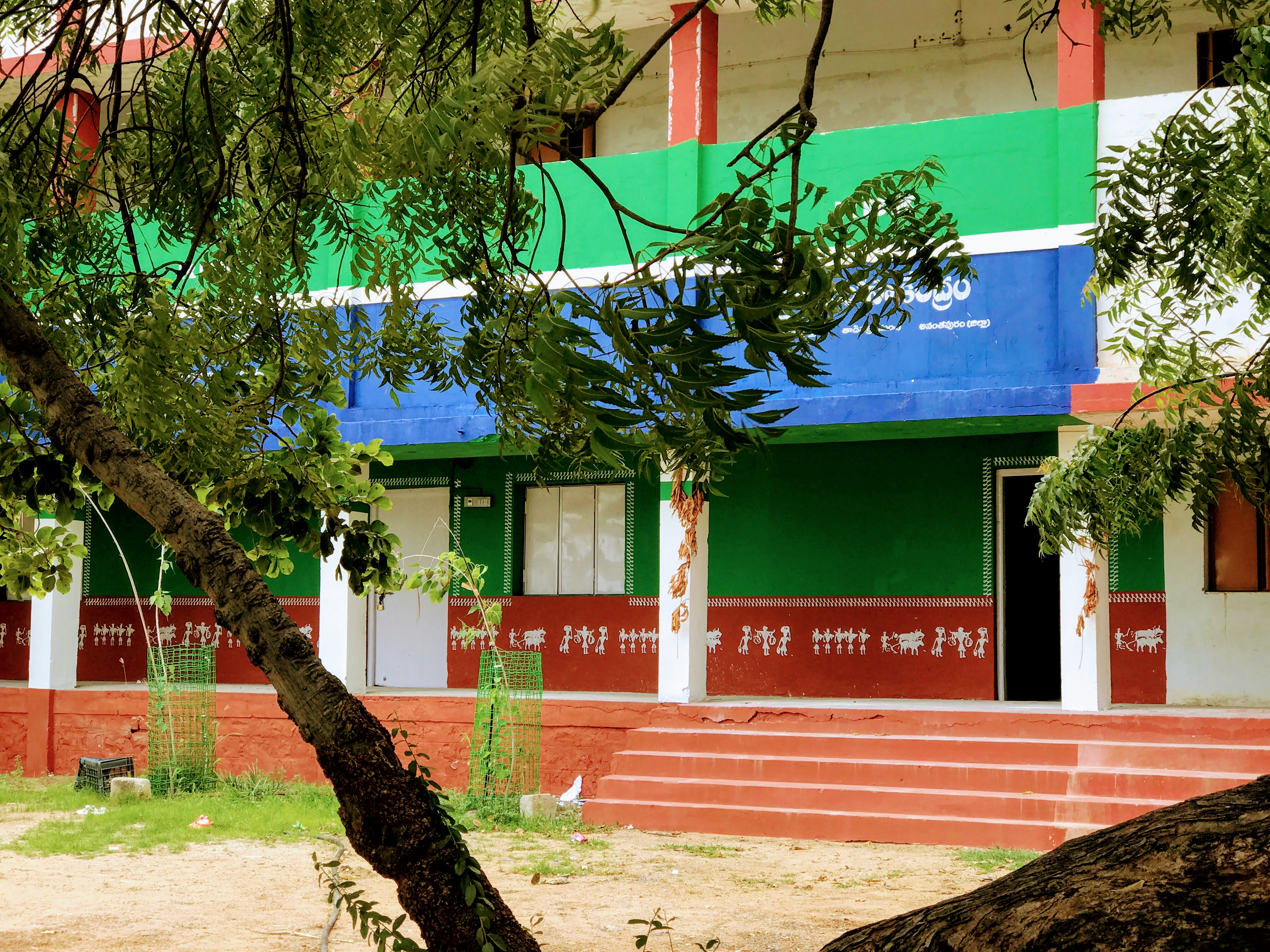
Tadipatri-Ward-Sachivalayam

The municipality of the city oversees the civic needs like, water supply, sewage, garbage collection etc. It also implements strict ban on the use of plastic. In 2015, S.Shiva Ram Krishna was awarded Green Leaf Awards 2015 in the category of Best Municipal Commissioner, which was organised by Revanth Nagaruru.

=== Population ===
As of the 2001 India census, Tadipatri had a population of 86,641. Males constitute 51% of the population and females 49%. Tadipatri has an average literacy rate of 56%, lower than the national average of 59.5%: male literacy is 67%, and female literacy is 44%. In Tadipatri, 13% of the population is under 6 years of age.

== Economy ==
On 10 September 1976, an industrial estate was established under APIIC in 9.09 acres (3.68 ha).

== Transport ==
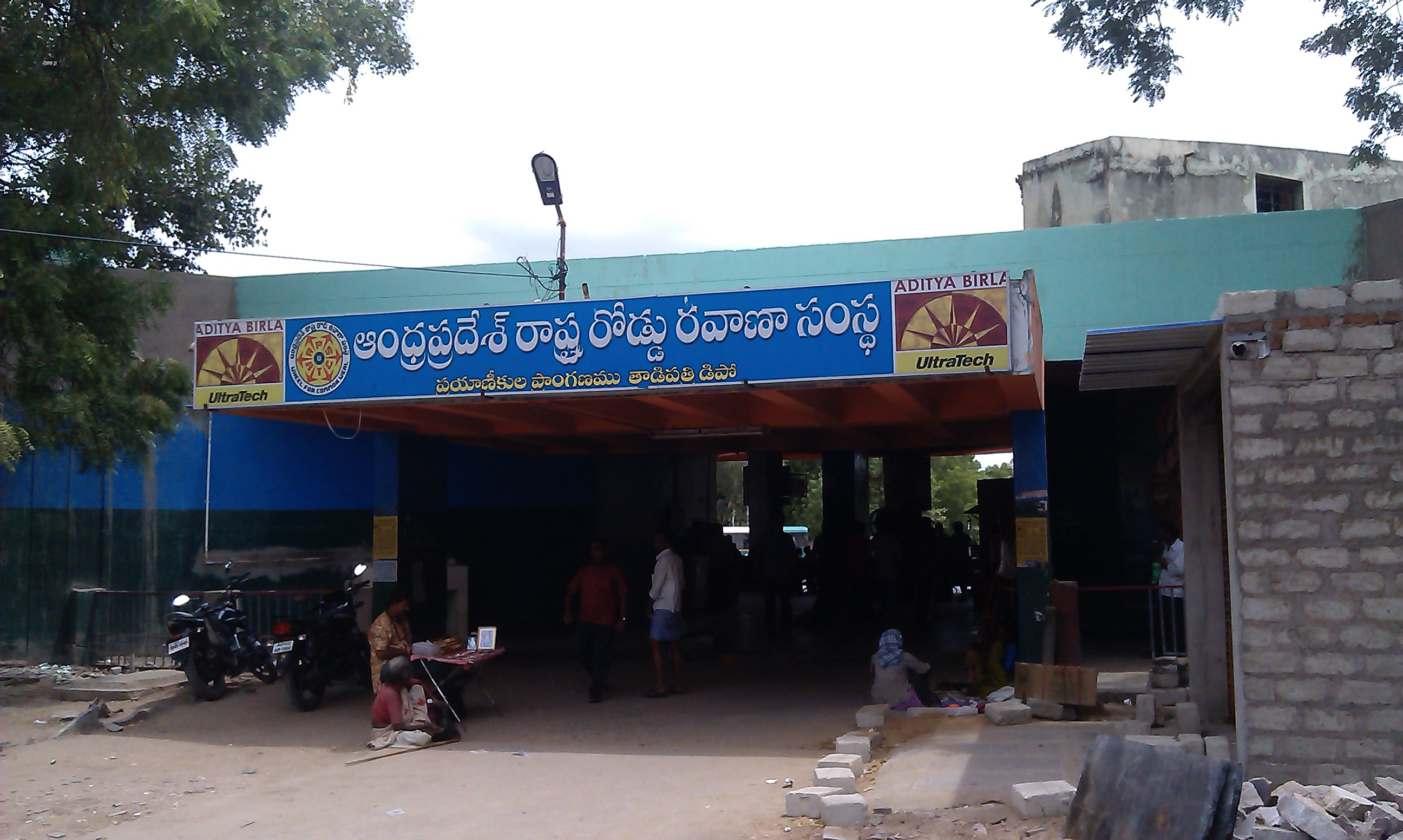
Tadipatri Bus Depot

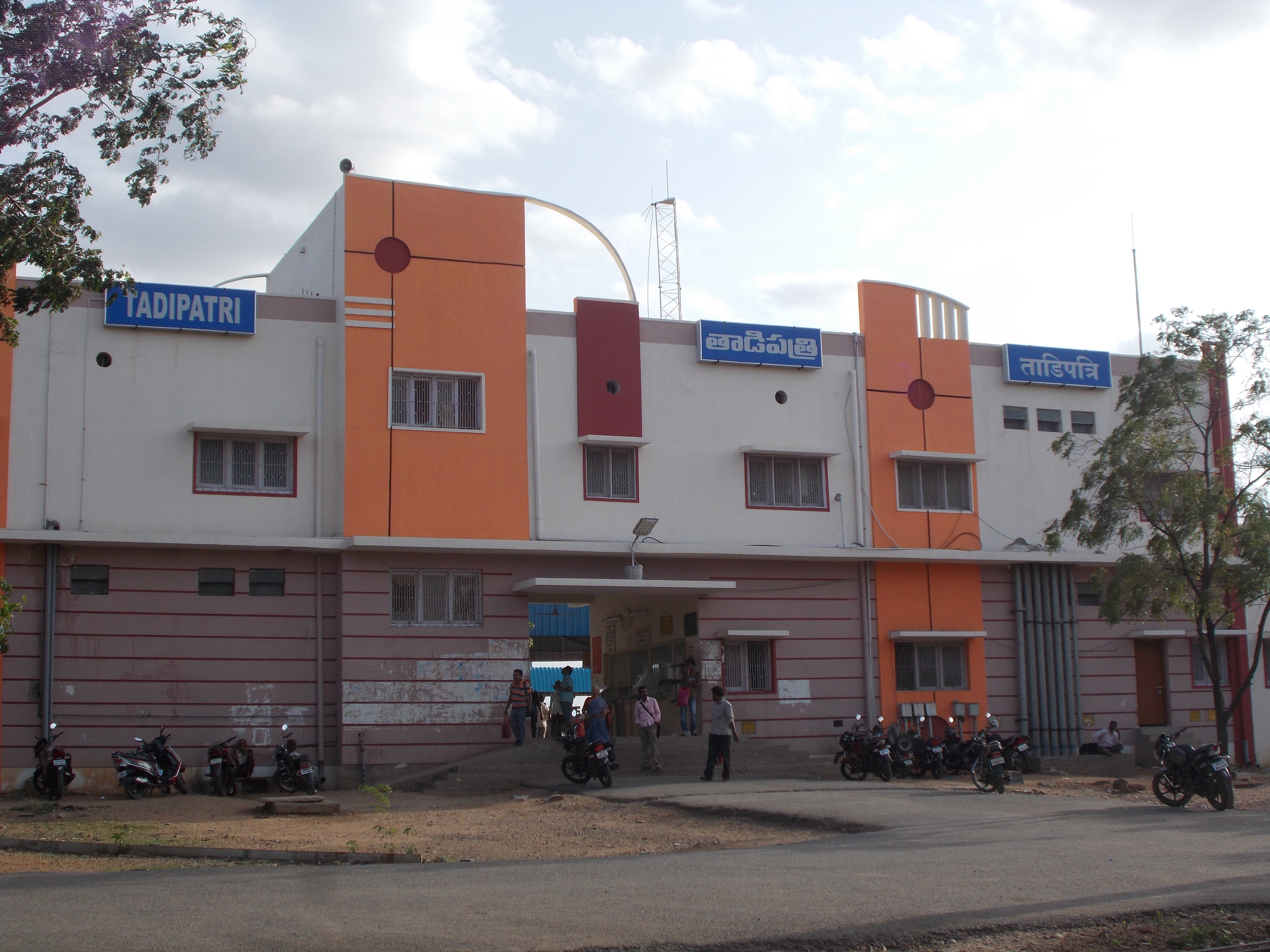
Tadipatri Railway Station

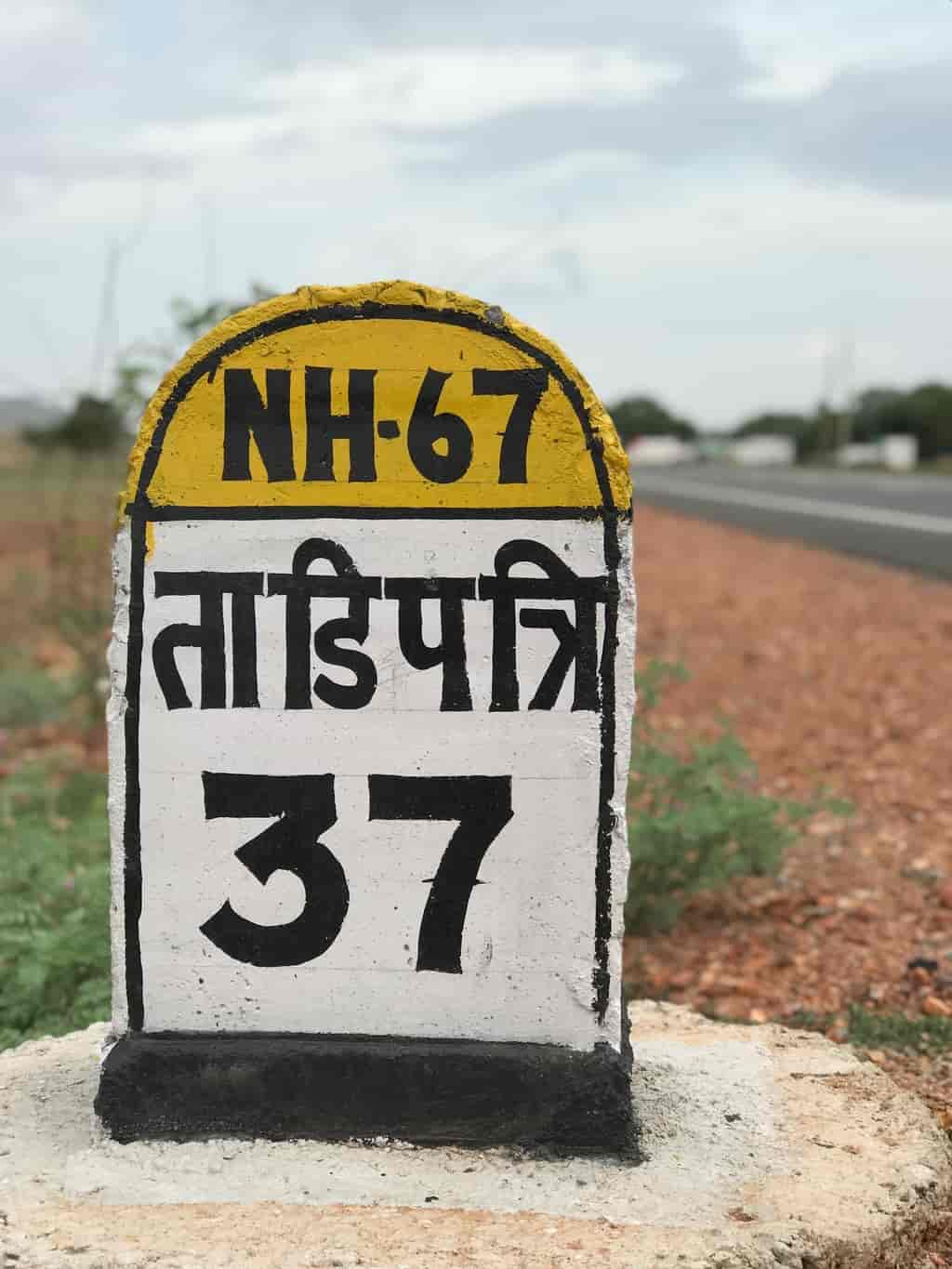
NH 67 - Road from Gooty to Tadipatri

The Andhra Pradesh State Road Transport Corporation operates bus services from Tadipatri bus station. State Highway 30 passes through Tadipatri, which connects Anantapur and Bugga. Tadipatri railway station is classified as a C–category station in the Guntakal railway division of South Central Railway zone.

== Culture ==
Art and architecture

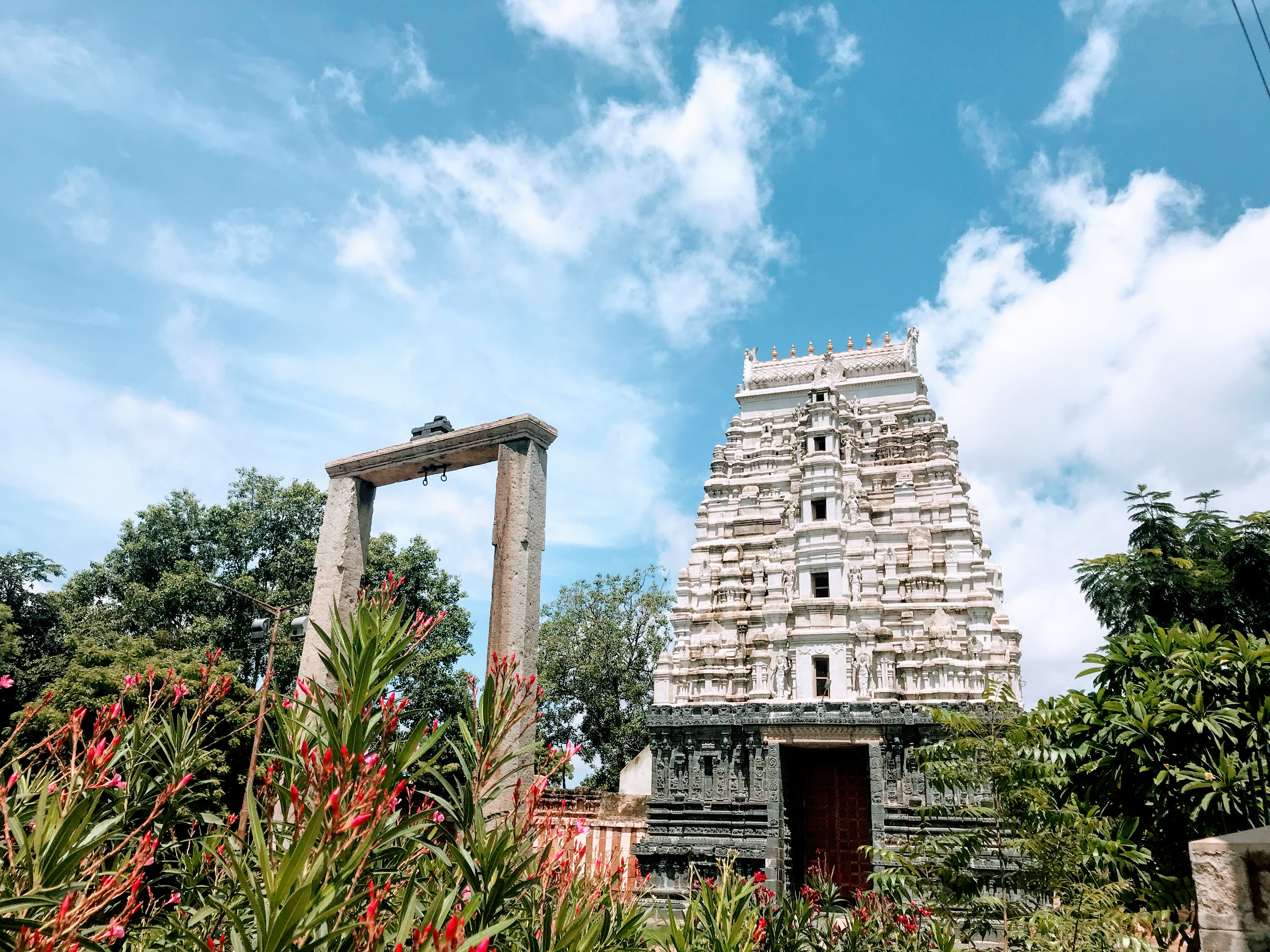
Tadipatri - Sri Chintala Venkataramana Temple

Some of the finest carvings of the early Vijayanagara period are from Tadipatri, a treasure-house of fine Vijayanagara sculpture.

== Education ==
The primary and secondary school education is imparted by government, aided and private schools, under the School Education Department of the state. The medium of instruction followed by different schools are English, Telugu

== Notable personalities ==
- Moola Narayana Swamy – He founded Vauhini Studios, which was a large cine studio during the 1940s.

== See also ==
- List of cities in Andhra Pradesh
