= Yadiki =

Yadiki vedukapuram
- Village
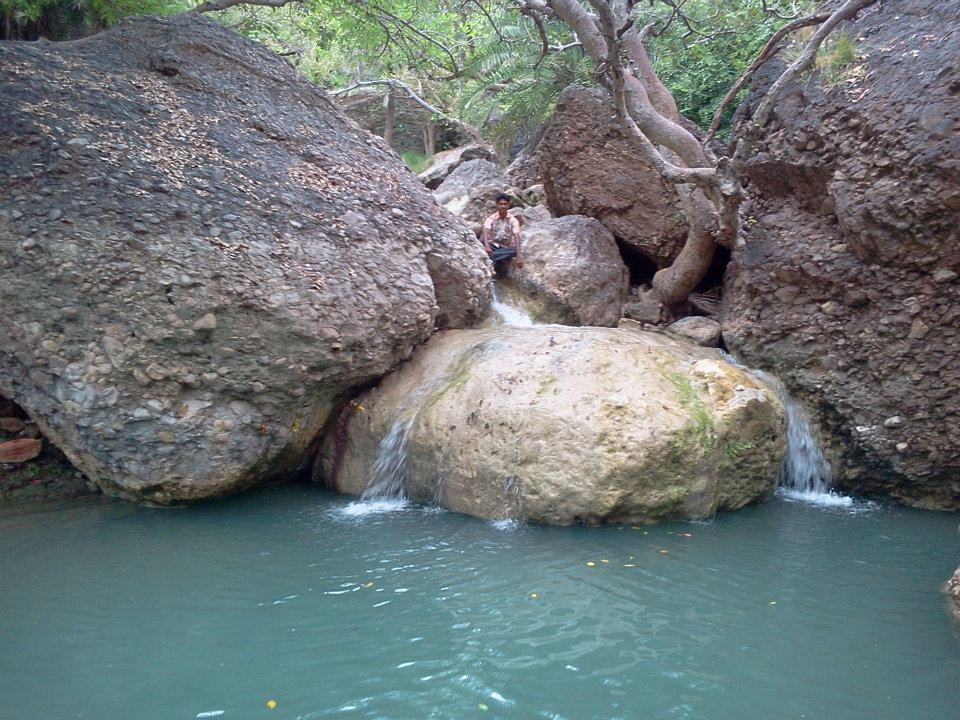
- Aluru kona is near to Yadiki
- Interactive map of Yadiki
- Location in Andhra Pradesh, India Yadiki (India)
- Coordinates: 15.05°N 77.88°E
- Country: India
- State: Andhra Pradesh
- District: Anantapur
- Talukas: Yadiki

Languages
  - Official: Telugu
- Time zone: UTC+5:30 (IST)
- PIN: 515408
- Telephone code: +91–8558

Yadiki is a village in Anantapur district of the Indian state of Andhra Pradesh. It is the mandal headquarters of Yadiki mandal in Anantapur revenue division.

Yadiki Caves are located midway between Gooty and Tadipatri. The cave system is situated in the village of Konapulappadu which is 18 km from Yadiki village. The Geemanugavi cave stretches for 5 km in length and visitors can explore up to 2 km inside..

This village is also known for its silk saris. The village is a hub for silk clothing and notably, nearly 70% of the population is engaged in this occupation.
