= Kaifiyat =

Indian historical document

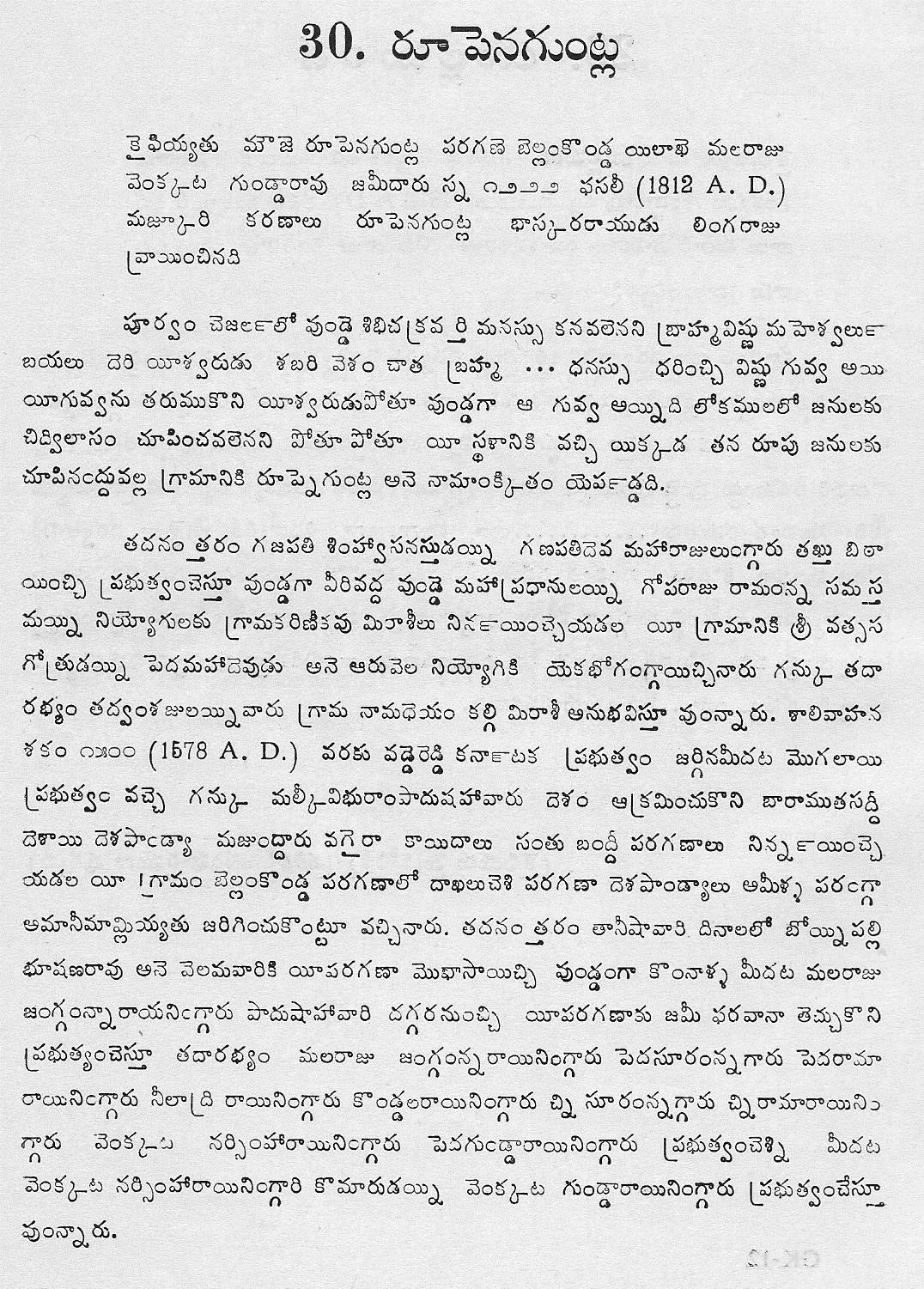
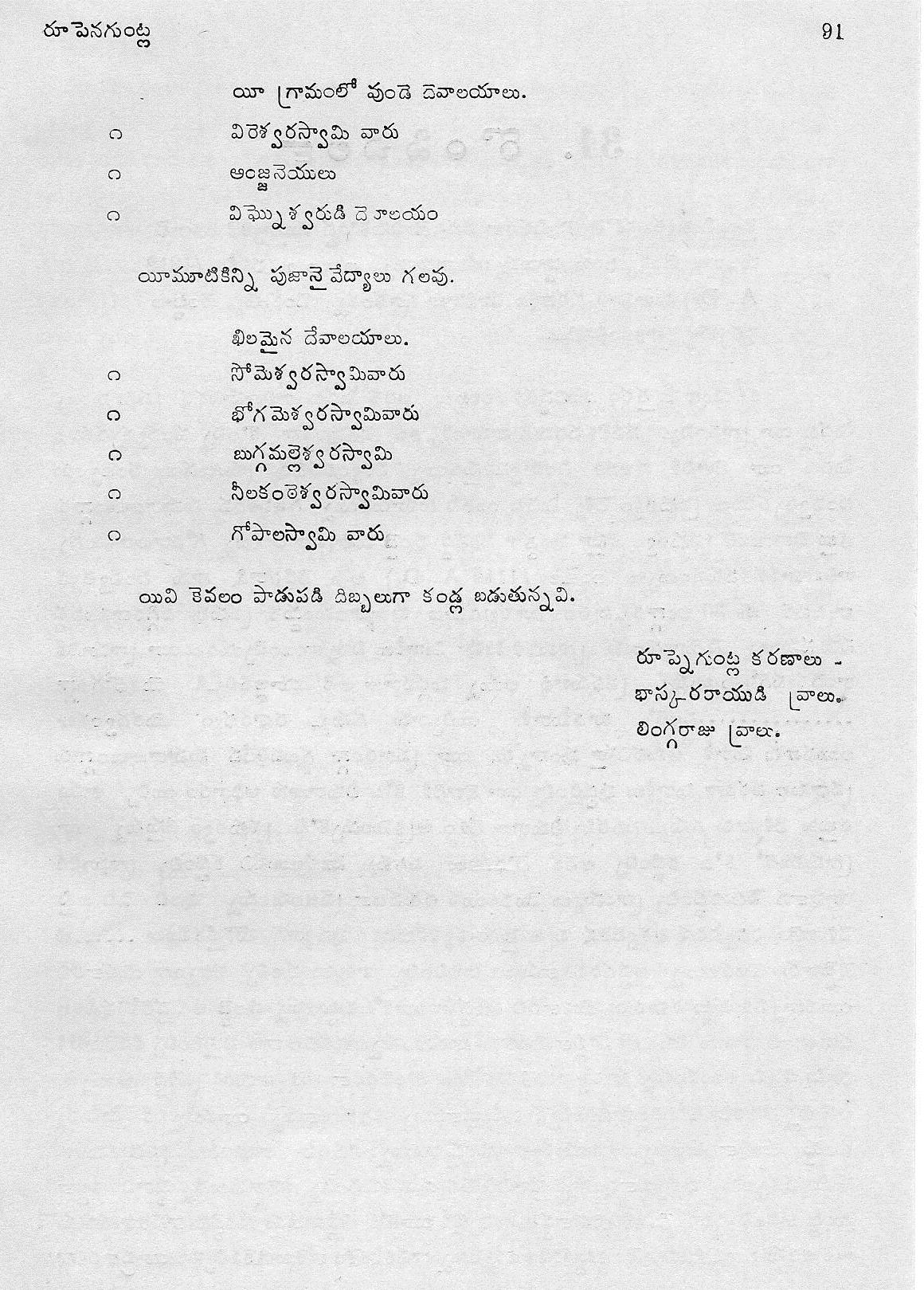
Telugu language kaifiyat of Rupenguntla village

A Kaifiyat is a historical record, especially about a village or a town, from the Deccan region of India. Compiled in 18th and 19th centuries by village accountants, based on earlier records, the kaifiyats are a valuable source of local history. Many of them are part of the Mackenzie Manuscripts compiled by Colin Mackenzie and his assistants during 1780-1820.

== Etymology ==
The word kaifiyat is of Arabic origin, and comes to India from Persian, which was the official language of the Deccan sultanates. Depending on the context, it has various meanings including "circumstances, account, statement, report, particulars, story, and news." By the late 18th century, the word had entered the Telugu vocabulary, and meant "village account". Among scholars, the term became popular when Colin Mackenzie's project to compile rural archives used it to describe the compiled village histories.

== History ==
The kaifiyats are written in multiple scripts and languages, including Telugu, Tamil, Kannada, Malayalam, Marathi, and Sanskrit. The largest number of the manuscripts are in Telugu.

Even before the kaifiyats were first compiled in the 18th century, the village officials of the Telugu-speaking region maintained chronicles called dandakavile or kavile. The Kakatiya rulers (1158–1323) had established the office of karanam, who maintained such records. The karanam was a village accountant, similar to the patwari of northern India. By the late 18th century, such officials had started compiling local records in form of kaifiyats, transmitting them from one generation to another.

The British East India Company officer Colin Mackenzie and his assistants came across the kaifiyats, and valued them as sources of local history. During 1780-1820, Mackenzie and his assistants collected kaifiyats from several villages, often encountering resistance and lack of cooperation from the village officers. Most of these kaifiyats were written down in the late 18th and early 19th century.

The colonial historians and the early historians of independent India preferred kaifiyats over other literary sources of history because of verifiable details about village economy and genealogy. However, they did not regard these documents as fully reliable because of the presence of mythical sections. Several later historians have analyzed kaifiyats as a source of history.

== Contents ==
The kaifiyats vary a lot from one another, and may contain both historical and mythical information:

- origin stories of the village, often mythological accounts tracing the lineage of important families to the origin
- list of main rulers of the region
- land use
- list of crops and other agricultural products
- list of animals (including wild animals in the adjoining forests)
- family histories and genealogies of important families
- list of land-owning families
- lists of inam (rent-free) lands
- accounts of prominent castes
- history of temple donations
- transcriptions of epigraphical records
