= Archaeological sites of Djerba =

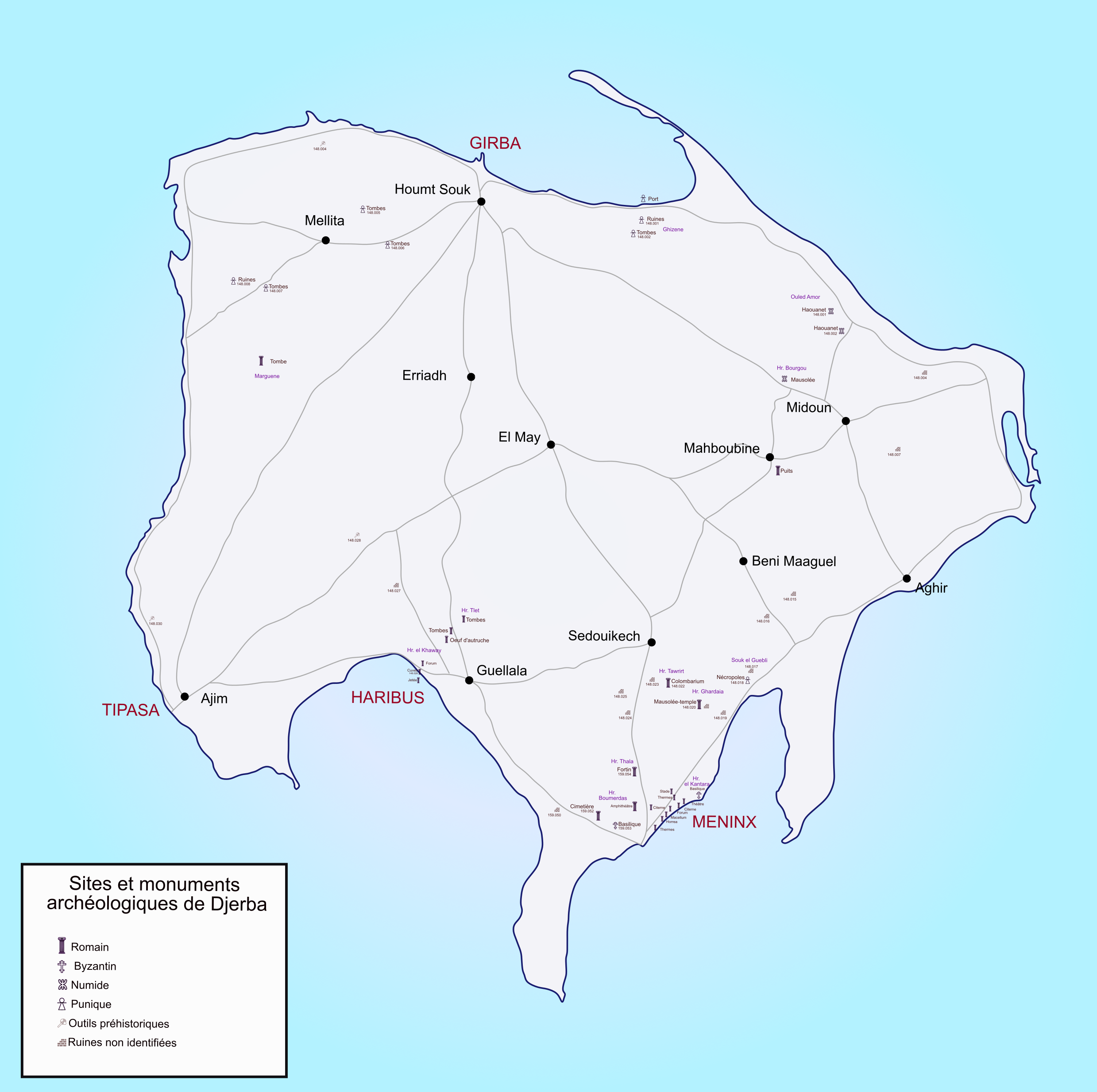
Archaeological map of Djerba.

The archaeological sites of Djerba form an ensemble of ancient remains located on the island of Djerba, in southeastern Tunisia. Testifying to several millennia of human occupation, these sites reflect the historical, cultural, and religious richness of an island that long served as a strategic crossroads in the Mediterranean Basin. From the Protohistoric period to the Roman era, through the Punic and Numidian periods, Djerba preserves remarkable traces of urban planning, cult practices, economic activities, and funerary traditions.

== History of research ==
=== Pre‑archaeological period ===
During this period, Djerba did not benefit from genuine archaeological research: contributions were limited mainly to the reuse of ancient written sources and textual descriptions, without excavations or systematic analyses.

==== 1853 ====
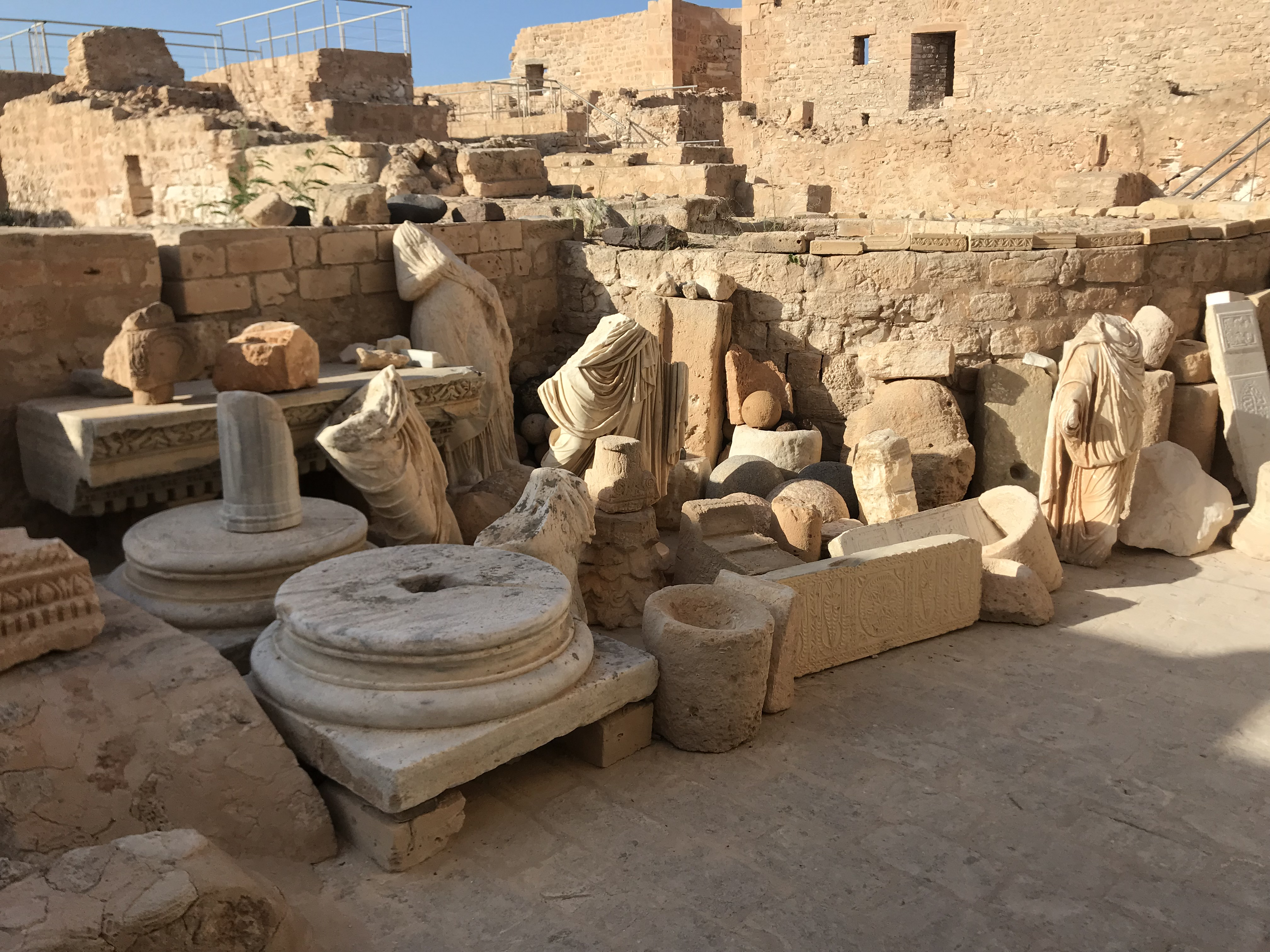
Archaeological artefacts (Borj Ghazi Mustapha).

Edmond Pellissier de Reynaud mentions Meninx and refers to the ruins located in the southeast of the island, which appear only as confused heaps of debris. Members of the Ben Ayed family undertook excavations there with the aim of extracting building materials for a house (now known as Ksar Ben Ayed). Several parts of a large structure were thus uncovered — whether a temple or a palace — where marble was used abundantly. Among the discoveries were column shafts, capitals, richly decorated friezes, marble revetment plaques, two colossal headless statues in white marble (those of an emperor and an empress), as well as an inscription engraved on a pedestal.

==== 1860 ====
Victor Guérin recounts the journey he undertook and reports several major archaeological discoveries. He mentions, among others, the remains of a square‑shaped monument in the gardens of Taorit, as well as the existence of an ancient village at a place called Thala. He also describes the remains of a vast city surrounded by an enclosure of about five kilometres in perimeter, including a fortified castle, cisterns, columns, and statues. Guérin further notes that English visitors were taking precious marbles from these sites, while the *kaïd* Saïd Ben Ayed used fine materials for the construction of his palace. Finally, he lists several fortified structures, including Bordj‑el‑Kantara, Bordj‑el‑Bab, Bordj‑Tarik‑el‑Djemal, Bordj‑Rhir (Aghir), and Bordj‑Kastil.

==== 1882 ====
Two notes were sent to the Académie des inscriptions et belles-lettres by Marie Henry Charles Hussenet, senior military physician residing in Djerba.

The first note reports that excavations carried out in the ruins of ancient Meninx by a detachment of the 78th infantry regiment, under the supervision of Lieutenant Le Hello, concerned a basilica located at the eastern end of the site, about 1500 m from a large temple. The building, entirely paved, was bordered by remarkable tombs. The investigations uncovered an inscription from a burial located beneath the first bay of the right-hand side aisle. This tomb was built of finely cut stone slabs; one of them, shaped as a truncated quadrangular pyramid and decorated with a Latin cross, formed part of the cover.

The second note mentions two Christian buildings of Gaul located at Girba (Meninx), which Hussenet attributes to the Roman or Byzantine period. This note was accompanied by two plans drawn by Lieutenant Le Hello.

==== 1884 ====
Charles-Joseph Tissot notes that the island of Djerba was the object of numerous visits and excavations. Among the archaeological discoveries were a large marble baptistery, statues in red sandstone, and a mosaic depicting four horses with plumed heads.

==== 1885 ====
Jean-Marie Brulard reports a legend according to which the name of Djerba derives from a highly venerated golden statue discovered in a now‑ruined church west of El‑Kantara, dating from the period when the region was occupied by the Greeks. He also describes the ruins of Meninx, where a few sections of the enclosure wall, a Roman *bordj*, remains of baths, and several well‑preserved cisterns survive, along with fragments of sacred and secular buildings. He mentions Henchir Borgo, reduced to a single standing wall; Rhabat Taorit, with a funerary monument featuring niches; and Thala, where a few remains of an ancient town survive and where inhabitants venerate a local marabout.

==== 1888 ====
Lieutenant Jean Servonnet and Dr Fernand Lafitte repeat the same earlier observations, adding that a large part of the antiquities of El‑Kantara, half‑buried in the sand, had recently been removed by the French aviso d’Estrées and transported to Tunis for the new Bardo Museum. Among these pieces were eight marble statues, including two monumental ones, all mutilated and missing their heads, hands, and feet. The inhabitants of Djerba reported that in 1862 or 1863 English officers had detached these parts to take them away. A Byzantine baptistery was transferred to La Goulette in 1884 by the gunboat *L’Étendard*. Deposited in bulk, the blocks remained on site for seven years before they could be transported to the Bardo.

==== 1892–1904 ====
Paul Gauckler was likely the first to undertake excavations at Meninx, notably the preliminary clearing of the two Christian basilicas. He published two plates of the churches: that of Henchir El Kanatara (Meninx) and that of Henchir Boumerdes.

==== 1908 ====
François Gendre reports the existence of imposing Roman ruins known as Henchir Rhardaia. They appear as a cubic mass of large ashlar blocks, about 3 m high and 12 m wide on each side. Inside are a well and two vaulted rooms, one of which has a collapsing vault. Traces of basins and conduits still visible on the terrace, as well as the remains of a circular channel that once surrounded the structure, suggest that it was a water tower.

Between the souk of Sedouikech and Henchir Rhardaia (Ghardaïa) lie the remains of an ancient mausoleum known locally as *Dar Rhoula* (Ghoula), “the house of the ogress.” Further north, the ruins of Henchir Thala, near the road to El‑Kantara, are accompanied by remains of conduits that once ran along this axis.

As for the ruins of ancient Meninx, they yield abundant marble fragments — capitals, cornices, columns, statues — as well as numerous cisterns, some reworked, traces of mosaics, and the remains of a basilica.

==== 1942 ====
Paul-Marie Duval resumed excavations and reported the absence of ramparts, as well as the presence of Punic hypogea located about one kilometre from the port of El‑Kantara in the direction of Guellala. He identified the remains of two bath complexes, an amphitheatre located 400 m from the city, two basilicas previously cleared in a rough manner by Gauckler, and a large esplanade probably connected to the forum. Duval notes that in 1901 eight sculpted pillars in pink limestone were transported to the Bardo Museum. The excavation uncovered, in addition to various architectonic fragments remarkable for their material, colours, and decoration, a row of twelve columns — six still standing — elements of two cornices, and five fragments depicting figures leaning against pillars, very likely representing “barbarians.”

=== Contemporary period ===
Several excavation campaigns have been carried out in Djerba, initiated by teams from the National Heritage Institute or conducted in collaboration with international institutions.

==== 1996–2000 ====
At the end of the 20th century, a major turning point was marked by the systematic survey conducted by a joint team from the University of Pennsylvania, the American Academy in Rome, and the INP. This mission, directed by Renata Holod, Elizabeth Fentress and Ali Drine, covered the entire island through regular transects, identified more than 400 sites, monuments, or artefacts, and offered for the first time a comprehensive view of human occupation on Djerba.

==== 2015 ====
A joint initiative between the Institute of Classical Archaeology of LMU Munich and the National Heritage Institute (Tunisia) led to the creation of an archaeological research programme dedicated to Meninx. Its main objective is to better understand the urban development of this ancient city. The first steps consisted of a large‑scale geophysical survey, which revealed the internal organisation of the city. Subsequently, two targeted excavation campaigns were carried out in 2017 and 2018. These investigations uncovered a wide variety of remains and artefacts, providing valuable insight into urban lifeways across the different historical phases of Meninx, from the Punic period to Late Antiquity, that is, from the 4th century BC to the 7th century AD.

In addition to terrestrial research, underwater explorations were undertaken for the first time, offering new perspectives on the city's harbour infrastructure — once renowned for its production of purple dye and its major commercial role in the Mediterranean Basin.

== Meninx ==
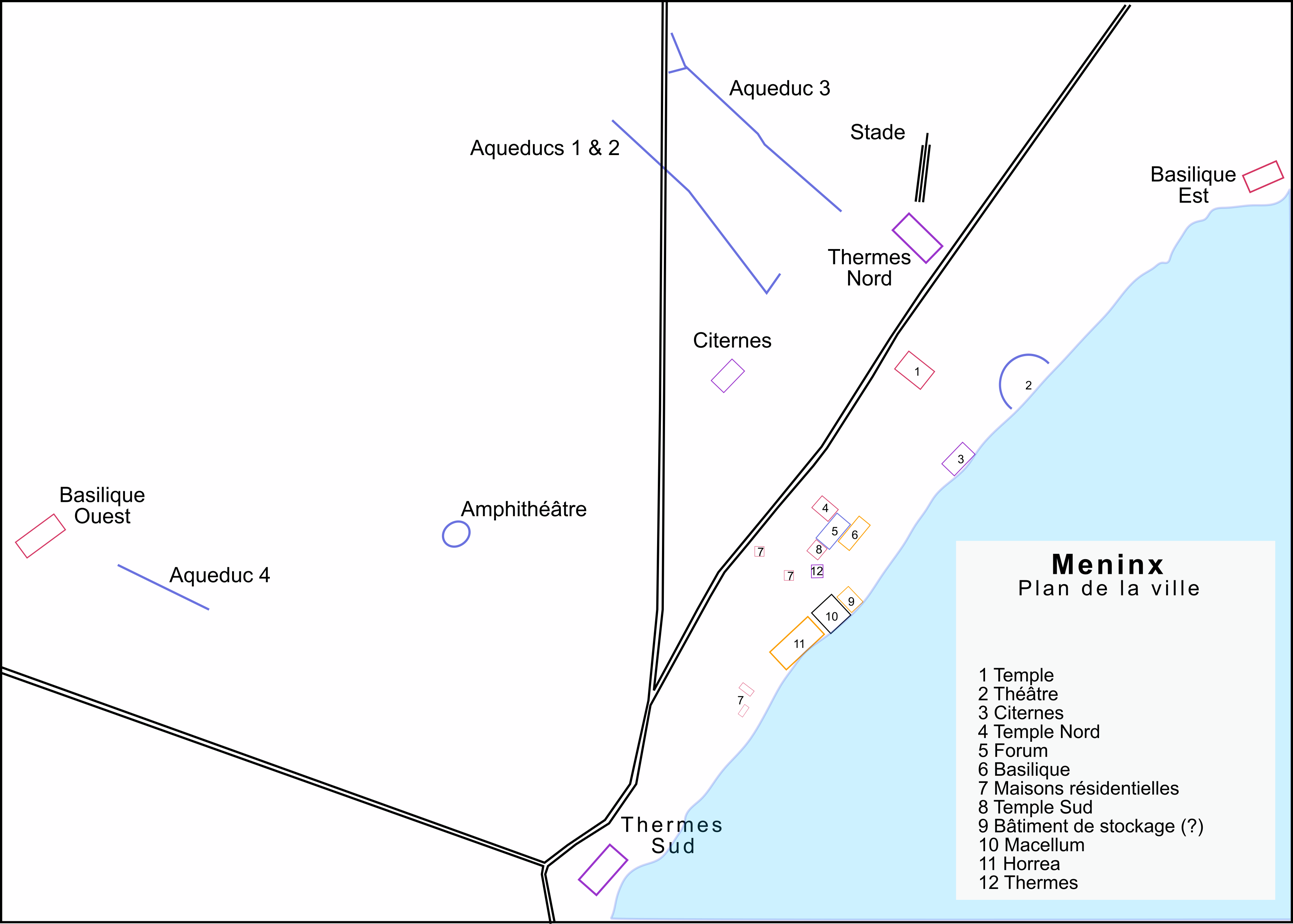
Plan of Meninx.

Located in the southeast of Djerba, near El Kantara, Meninx is one of the largest and richest archaeological sites on the island. Founded as a Phoenician trading post, it later became a flourishing Roman metropolis.

=== Market (macellum) ===
The macellum of Meninx, situated immediately south of the forum, is one of the best‑preserved and most characteristic buildings of the city. Built between the late Ist century and the early IInd century, it follows a square plan of about 60 m per side, organised around a large paved courtyard. At its centre stood a circular rotunda, probably intended for the sale of valuable goods. Around it, a series of shops opened onto a major circulation axis, reflecting intense commercial activity. The complex illustrates the prosperity of Meninx, based notably on purple dye and maritime products.

=== Warehouses (horrea) ===
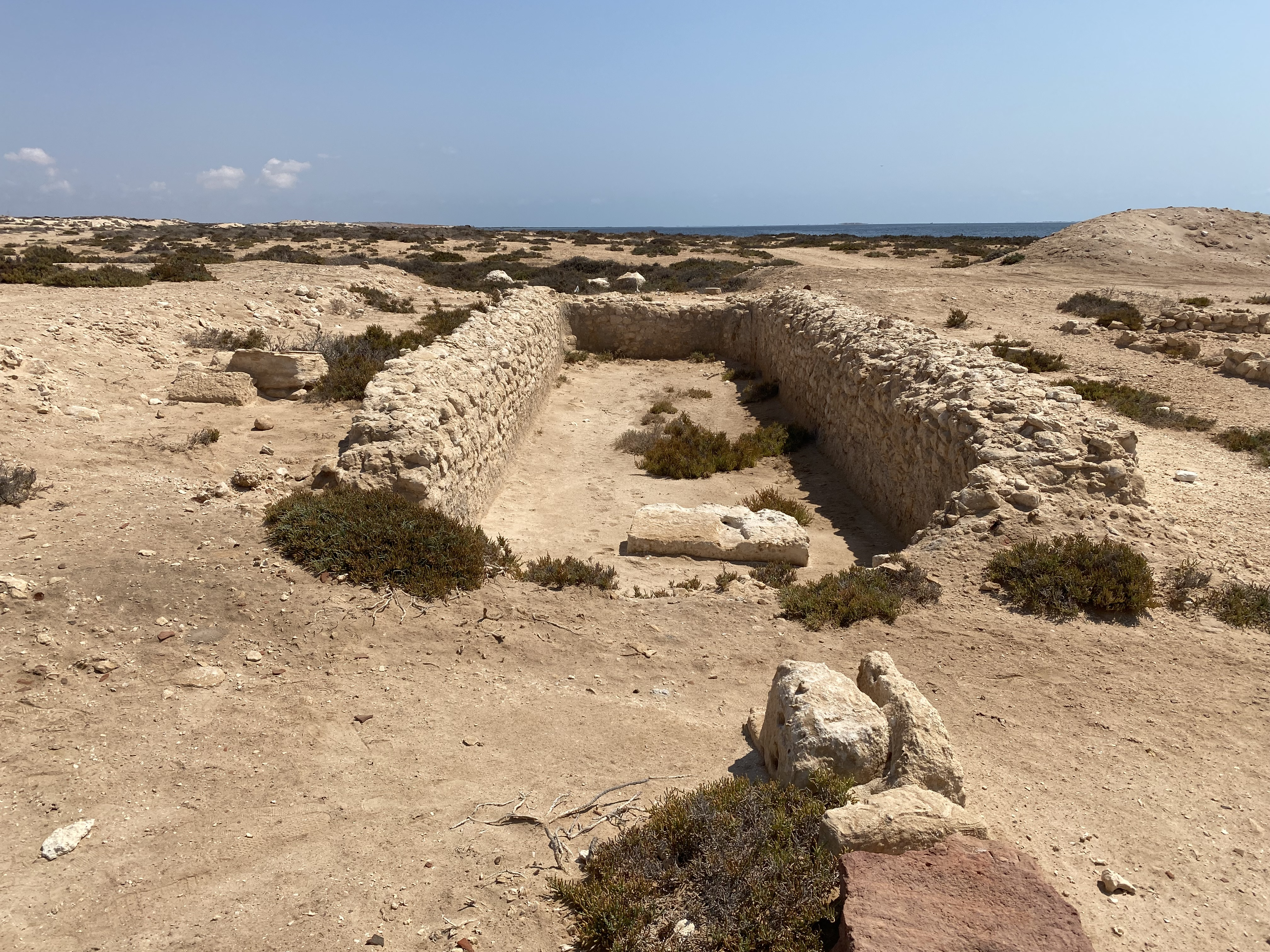
Horrea of Meninx.

South of the macellum, directly along the shoreline, extends a vast warehouse complex covering more than 2800 m2. These horrea consist of long rows of rectangular rooms, porticoes, vats, and cisterns. Their organisation suggests multiple functions: storage of salted products, garum, purple dye, but also wine and other goods. The proximity of the shoreline confirms the port and commercial role of Meninx, one of the major economic centres of the region.

=== Forum ===
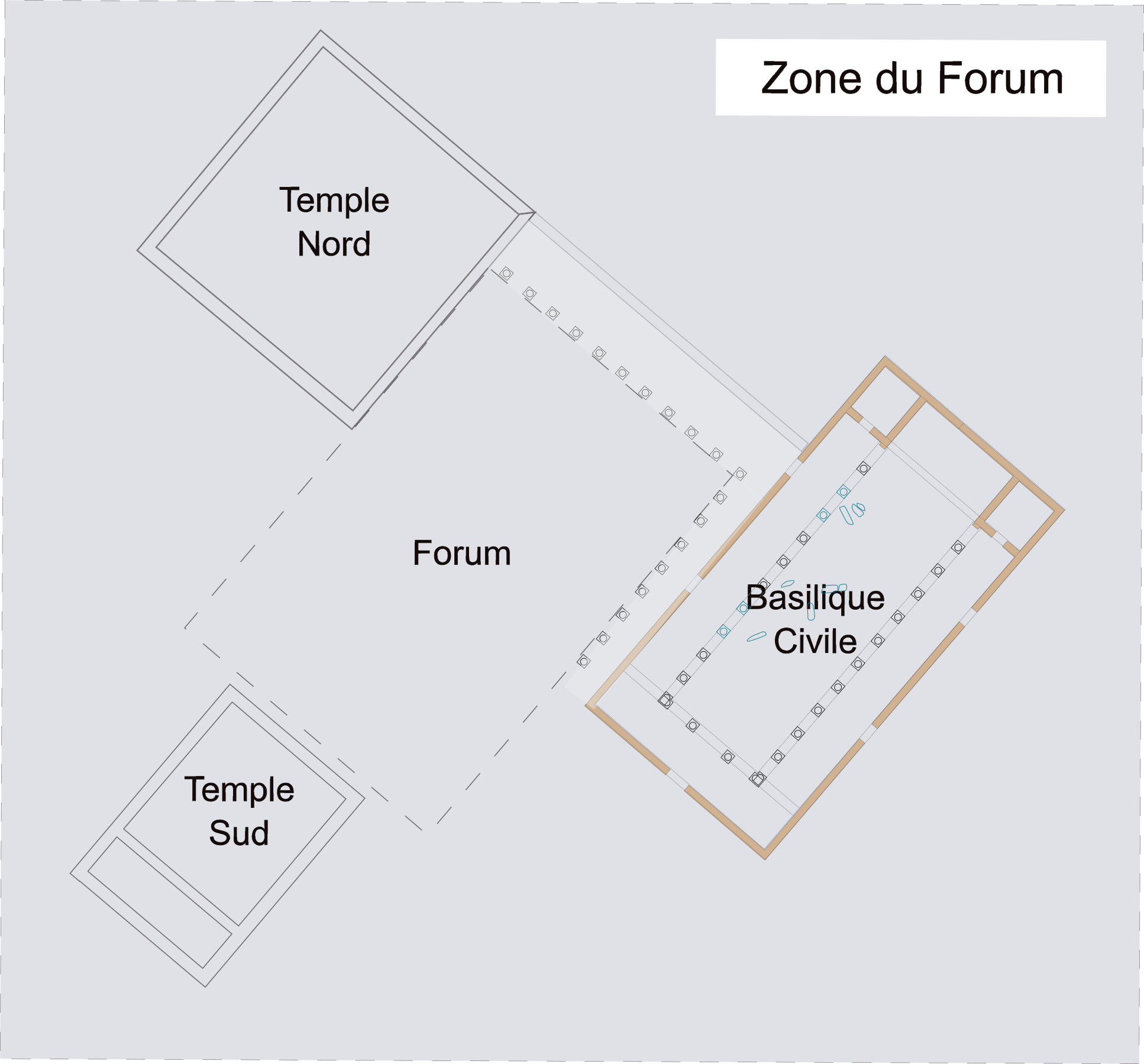
Forum of Meninx.

The forum, the civic heart of the city, is more modest in size than one might expect for such an active metropolis. It is nevertheless bordered by two porticoes, a civil basilica, and two temples. Excavations have yielded remarkable sculptural material, including a head of Antoninus Pius and fragments associated with the cult of Sarapis. This ensemble reflects the integration of Meninx into Roman urban models while preserving local specificities.

=== Basilicas ===
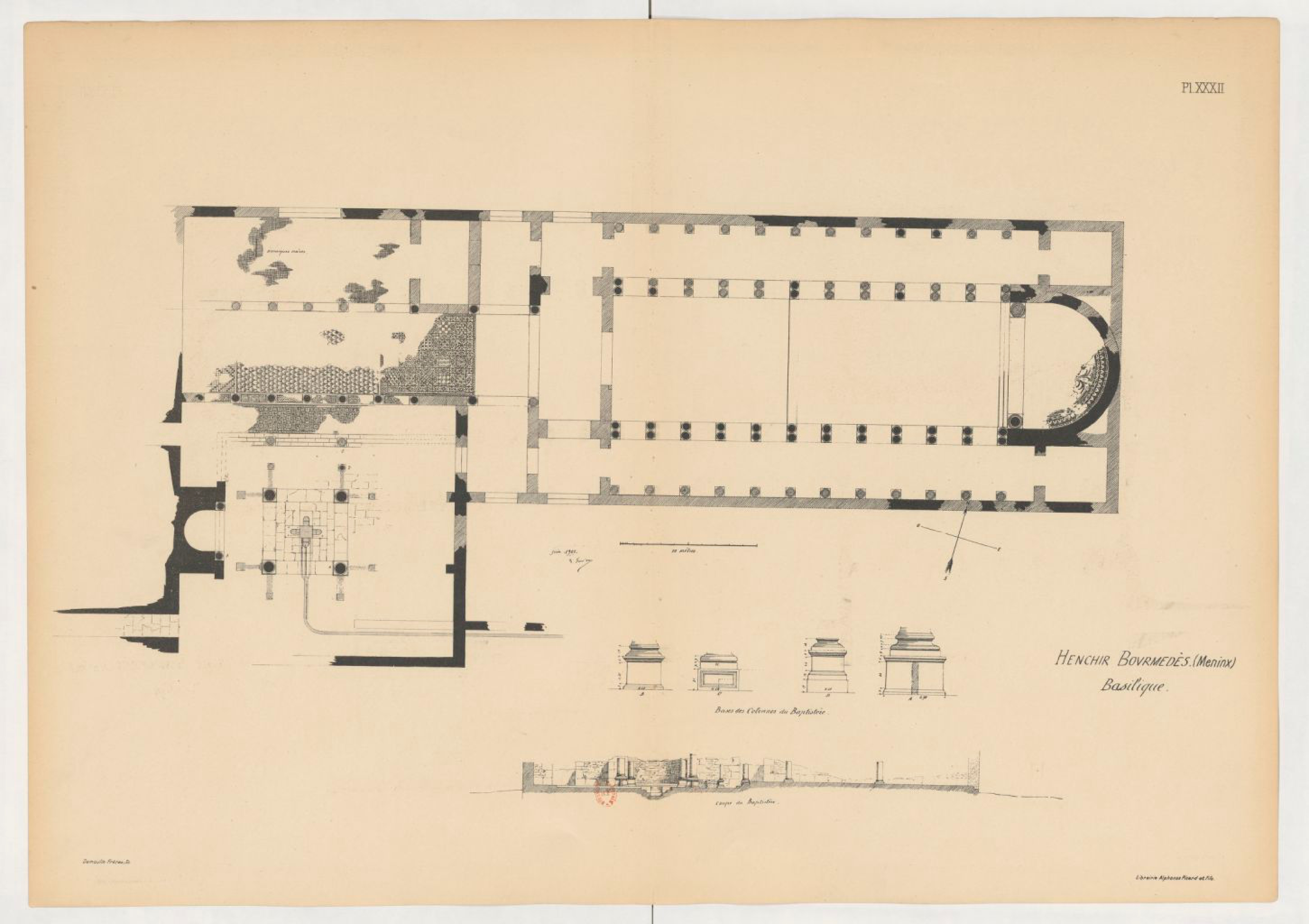
Plan of the western basilica.

Three basilicas have been identified: the civil basilica, the eastern basilica, and the western basilica. They display plans with colonnaded naves, monumental apses, mosaic floors, and liturgical or administrative installations. Their architectural diversity reflects the evolution of civic and religious functions in the city between the High Empire and Late Antiquity.

=== Sanctuaries ===
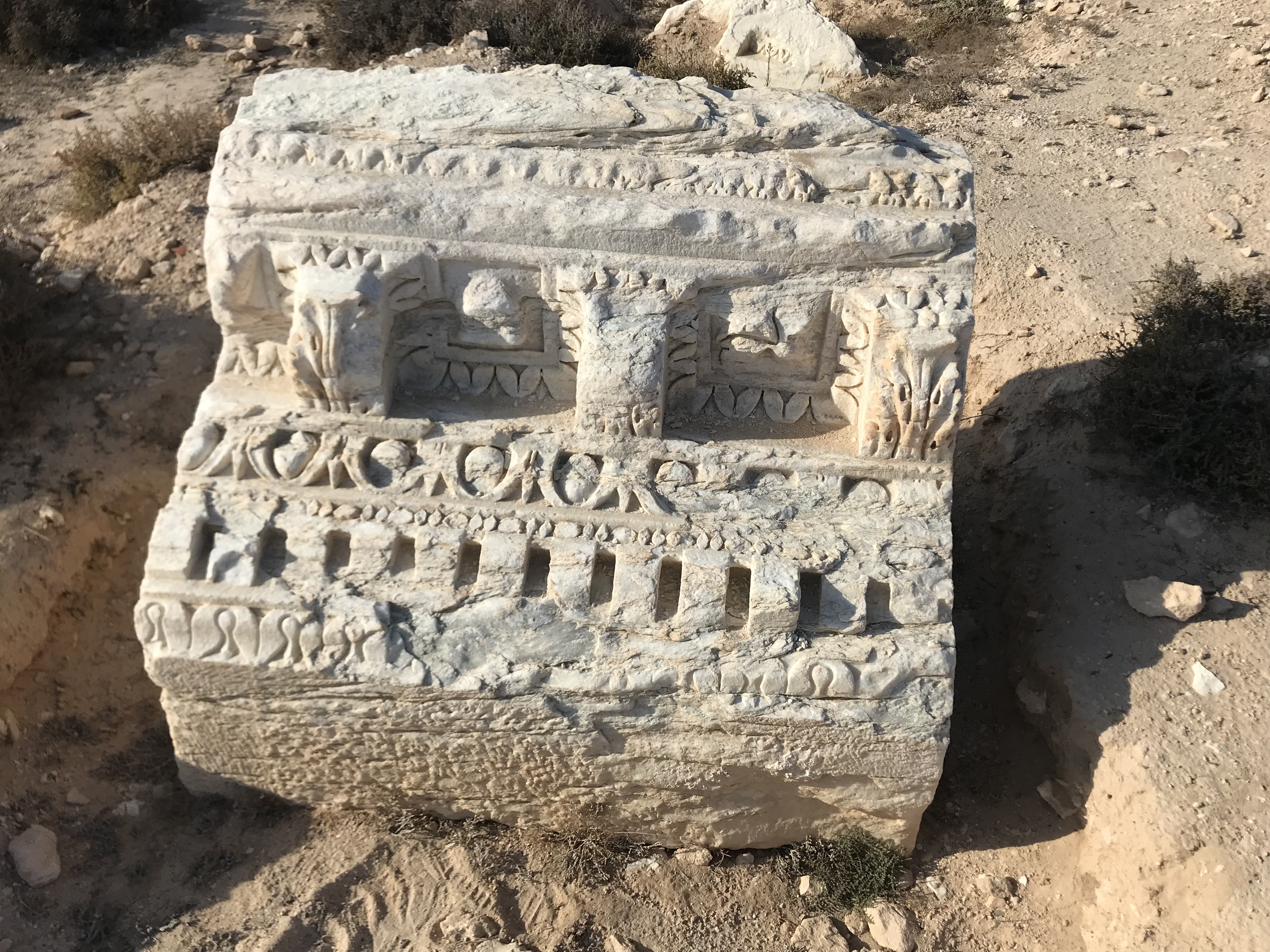
Cornice from the southern temple.

The sanctuaries of Meninx — including the northern temple, the southern temple, and the sanctuary of Isis — follow the North African model of the templum cum porticibus. They reveal a varied cultic life blending local traditions, Punic influences, and Greco‑Roman religious practices. The sanctuary of Isis in particular highlights the importance of eastern divinities within the city.

=== Baths ===
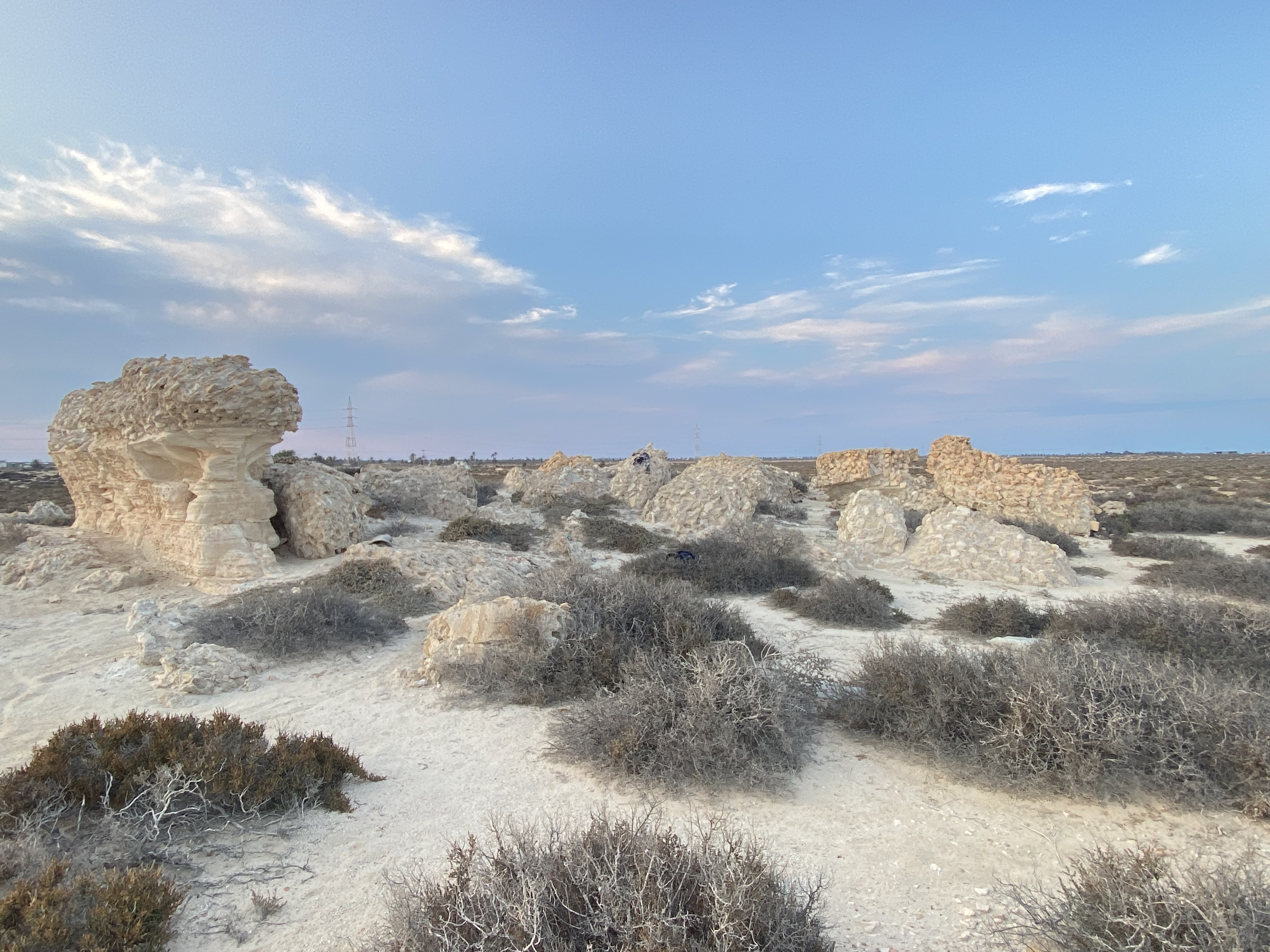
View of the large baths.

Two bath complexes have been identified, including the northern baths, the best preserved, and those located near the forum, which combine heated rooms, pools, hypocaust systems, mosaics, and sometimes reused statuary. Their multiplicity indicates a densely populated city equipped with elaborate public infrastructure.

=== Residential areas ===
The residential quarters show great variety: Neo‑Punic houses, Roman peristyle dwellings, homes equipped with cisterns, courtyards, wall paintings, and artisanal installations. This diversity reflects a stratified society and a complex urban fabric.

=== Cisterns and aqueducts ===
The hydraulic system includes large cisterns, such as the northern cistern complex, as well as several aqueducts dated to the 2nd–3rd centuries AD. These infrastructures demonstrate advanced technical mastery and a water‑supply system adapted to an expanding coastal city.

=== Theatres, amphitheatres, ramparts, and stadiums ===
A theatre with a diameter of 105 m, and a peripheral amphitheatre, still little excavated, confirm the existence of an ambitious monumental programme. Segments of ramparts and structures interpreted as stadiums complete this urban landscape, revealing a city equipped with civic, defensive, and entertainment facilities comparable to those of major African cities of the Empire.

== Necropoleis and funerary monuments ==
=== Henchir Bourgou ===
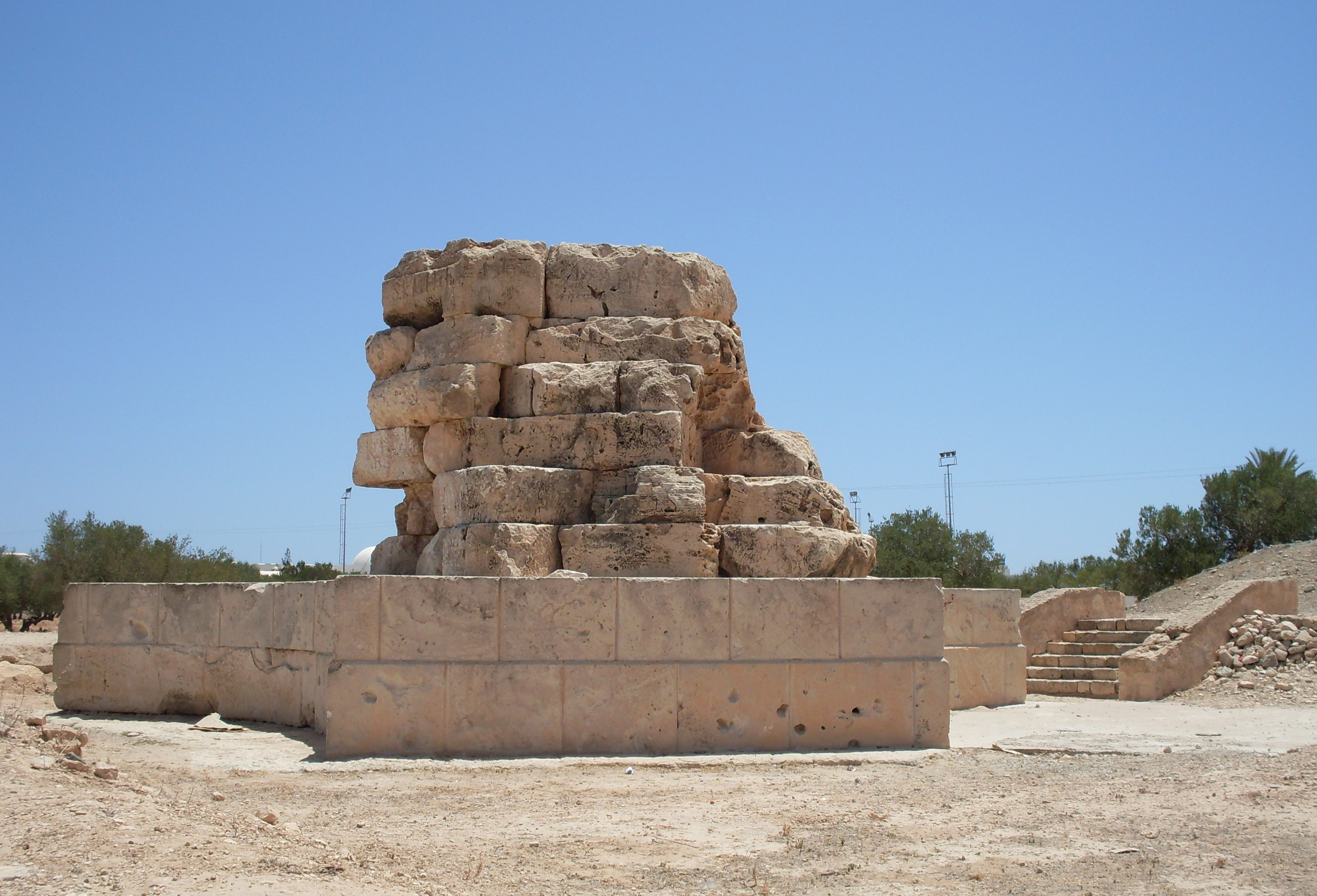
Numidian mausoleum of Henchir Bourgou.

Located north of the axis linking Houmt Souk to Midoun, and on the southern edge of a vast archaeological area with a radius of about 700 m, the site shows continuous occupation from the 4th–3rd centuries BC to the IVth century.

The earliest known mention dates to the early 19th century, when Abou Ras el Jerbi identified the remains of an ancient fortification. Later travellers, including Guérin in 1862 and Brulard in 1885, described a high wall built of large, carefully fitted blocks. It was only in 1903 that Barué, then civil controller, undertook the first clearings. He interpreted the monument as a square mausoleum topped by a stepped pyramid, an interpretation influenced by major Numidian tombs such as the Medracen or the Tomb of the Christian Woman.

After this intervention, the monument suffered numerous degradations, including the removal of stones and lead clamps. It was not until 1981 that excavations led by J. Akkari Weriemmi allowed the architecture of the building to be precisely reconstructed, revealing a remarkable monument both for its originality and the quality of its masonry. The mausoleum rests on a hexagonal substructure alternating straight and concave faces. This base, built of perfectly cut large blocks, supports a superstructure 4.52 m high. The fully cleared western façade contains the entrance, arranged in one of the straight sides.

Access is through a narrow, open‑air corridor leading to an antechamber and then to the rectangular funerary chamber. The ceiling of the latter reproduces palm‑trunk coverings, a technique known in Libyco‑Punic traditions and sometimes in the Hellenistic world. The walls are topped by a massive cornice of Punic inspiration, reinforcing the solemn aspect of the monument. Through its plan, techniques, and decoration, this mausoleum constitutes a remarkable example of North African funerary architecture of the late 3rd century BC, blending regional influences and local traditions.

=== Dar el Ghoula ===
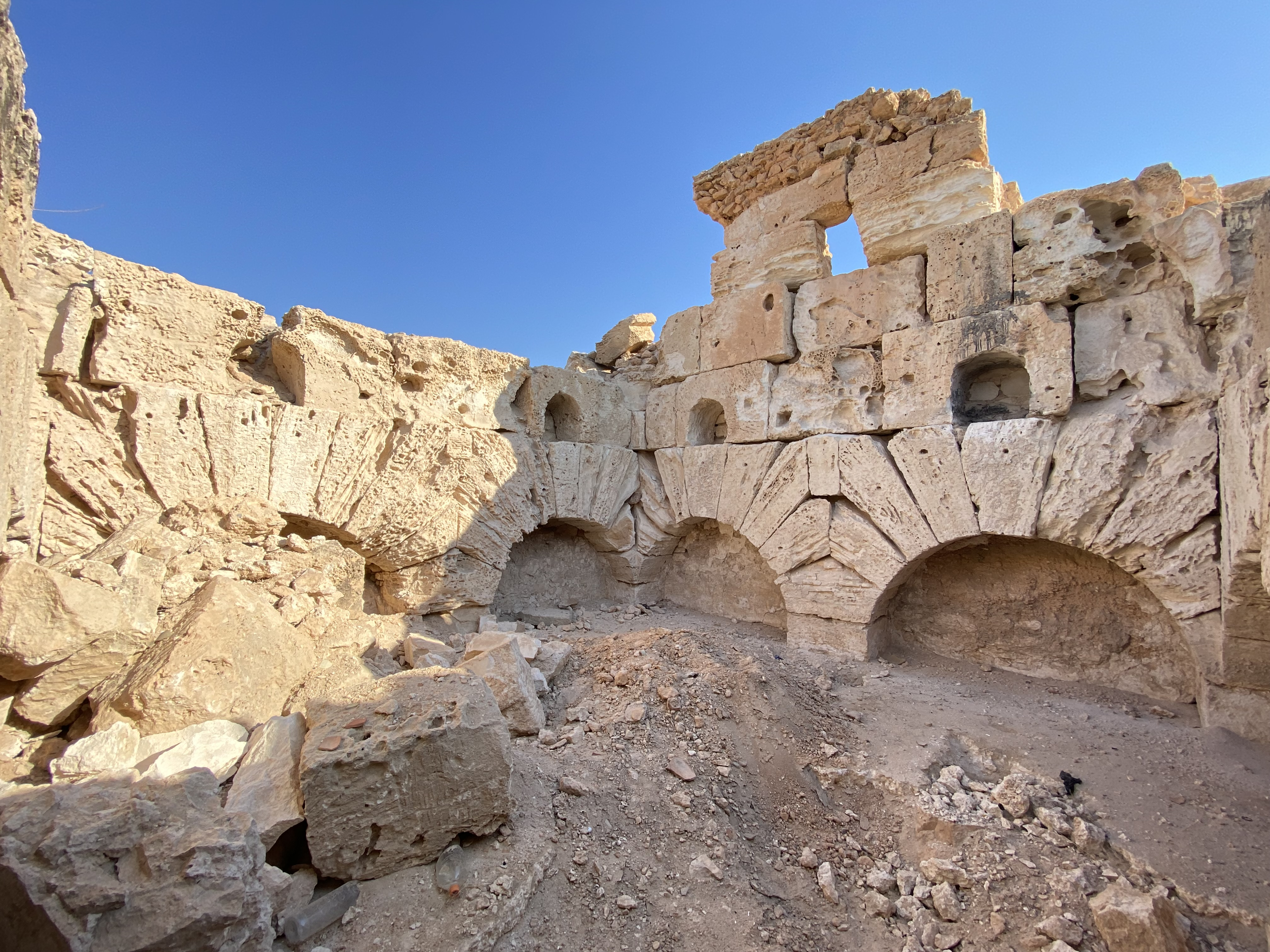
Mausoleum of Dar al‑Ghoula.

This monument was mentioned several times by French explorers in the late 19th century.

In 1860, Victor Guérin reported at Henchir Tawrirt a large quantity of stones piled in a confused manner among the remains of destroyed dwellings. Among these ruins stood the remains of a square monument eight metres on each side. The building, constructed of fine ashlar blocks with slightly recessed courses, appeared to be an ancient mausoleum. Deprived of its upper part, it preserved inside eight small arched niches, probably intended to hold funerary urns.

In 1888, Lieutenant Servonnet and Dr Lafitte reported at the same location the shapeless ruins of a small ancient town whose name remains unknown. Among these remains stood a square building eight metres on each side, built of well‑cut ashlar. By its appearance and the niches arranged inside the walls, the structure evoked an ancient mausoleum of the columbarium type.

The monument of Dar al‑Ghoula appears as a Roman funerary structure with a square base, built of large ashlar blocks arranged in double facing with a rubble core. Its exterior walls, built in slightly recessed courses, contrast with the perfectly aligned inner faces. The interior, of cubic plan, is articulated by eight arched niches carved into the base blocks, intended to receive cinerary urns, confirming the practice of cremation. The building was covered by a vaulted roof, remains of which survive on the north and west façades, while the original entrance — now lost — was probably located to the east. Identified as a collective columbarium, it is dated to the Roman Imperial period, between the 2nd and 4th century centuries AD, before the definitive disappearance of cremation.

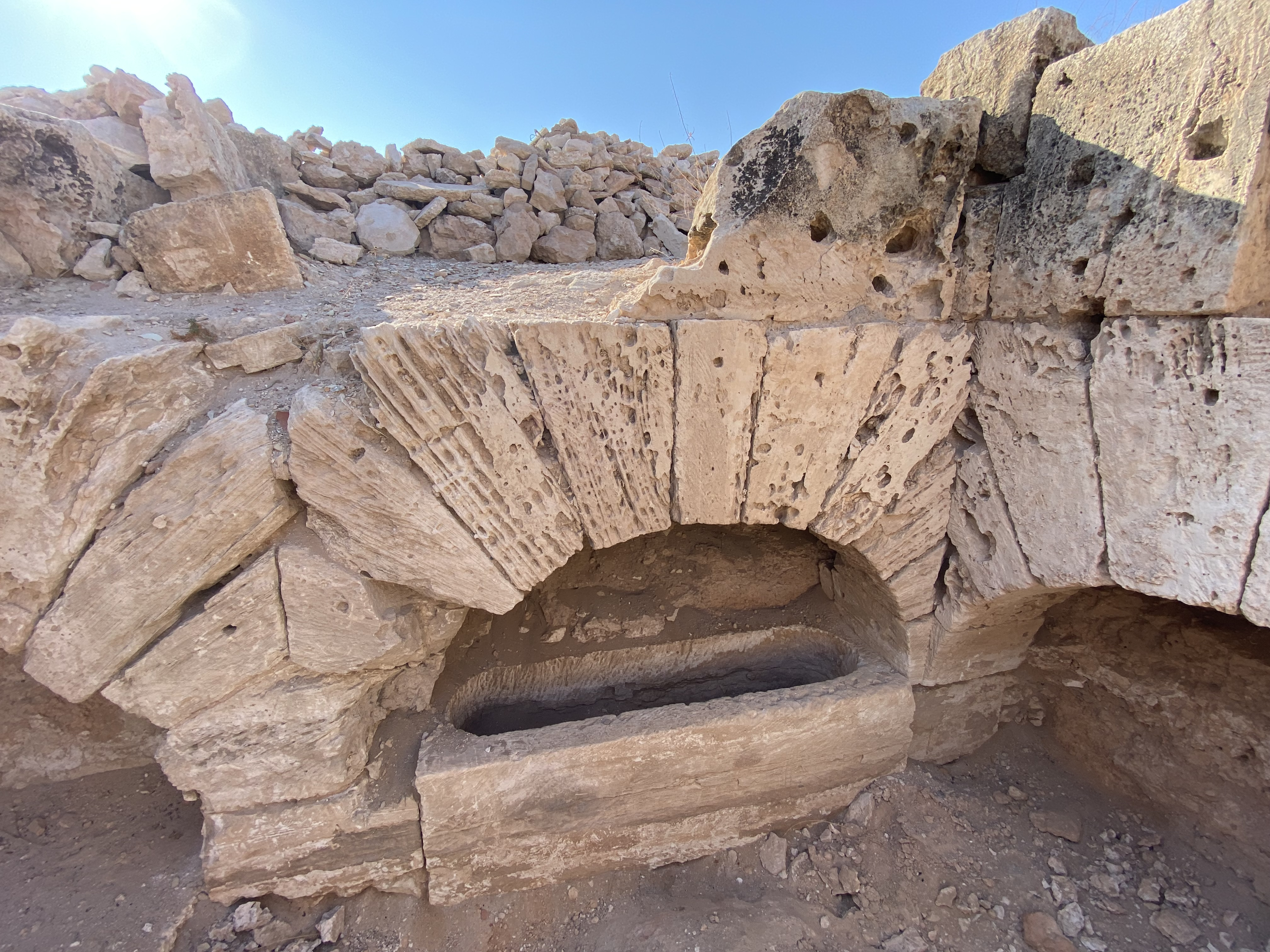
Vault sheltering a sarcophagus.

According to a more recent study (2014), it is in fact a Roman funerary monument that may correspond to a sepulchrum familiare associated with the villa of Henchir Tawrirt.

Recent photographs taken in 2025 reveal a lower level of the monument, located beneath the previously identified cinerary niches. This newly cleared level contains eight large symmetrically arranged vaults — two per wall — one of which shelters a stone sarcophagus. The full‑centred arches and the presence of a rectangular basin set into the floor suggest a more complex architectural organisation than initially described. In the absence of an official study, these elements may indicate a plural funerary function combining cremation and inhumation, inviting a reconsideration of the monument's interpretation.

=== Souk El Guebli ===
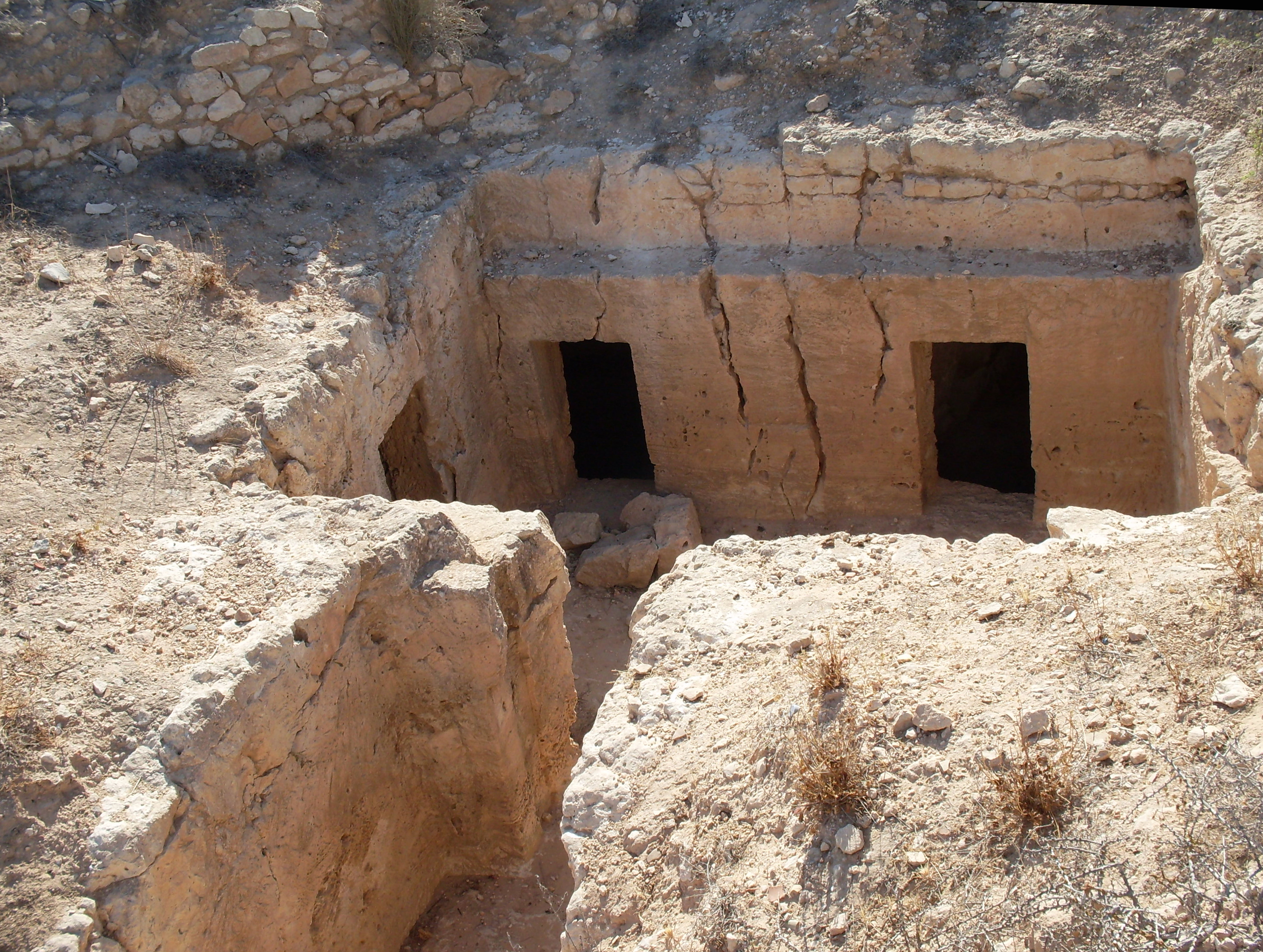
Necropoleis of Souk El Guebli.

Eight previously cleared burials have been identified on the site. Some were uncovered earlier through clandestine excavations carried out at unknown dates and under undocumented conditions. The remaining tombs were explored more methodically in the early 1950s by Ratel Gontran, then primary‑school inspector in Jerba.

In May 2004, an attempted looting led to the opening of a new excavation focusing on one of the tombs. This burial stands out for its multicellular organisation and consists of three main components: a dromos, an open central courtyard, and four funerary chambers.

The dromos, oriented northeast–southwest, is separated from the courtyard by a portcullis inserted into two grooves serving as a closing system. This corridor measures 3.25 m in length, with a width varying between 0.70 and 0.90 m.

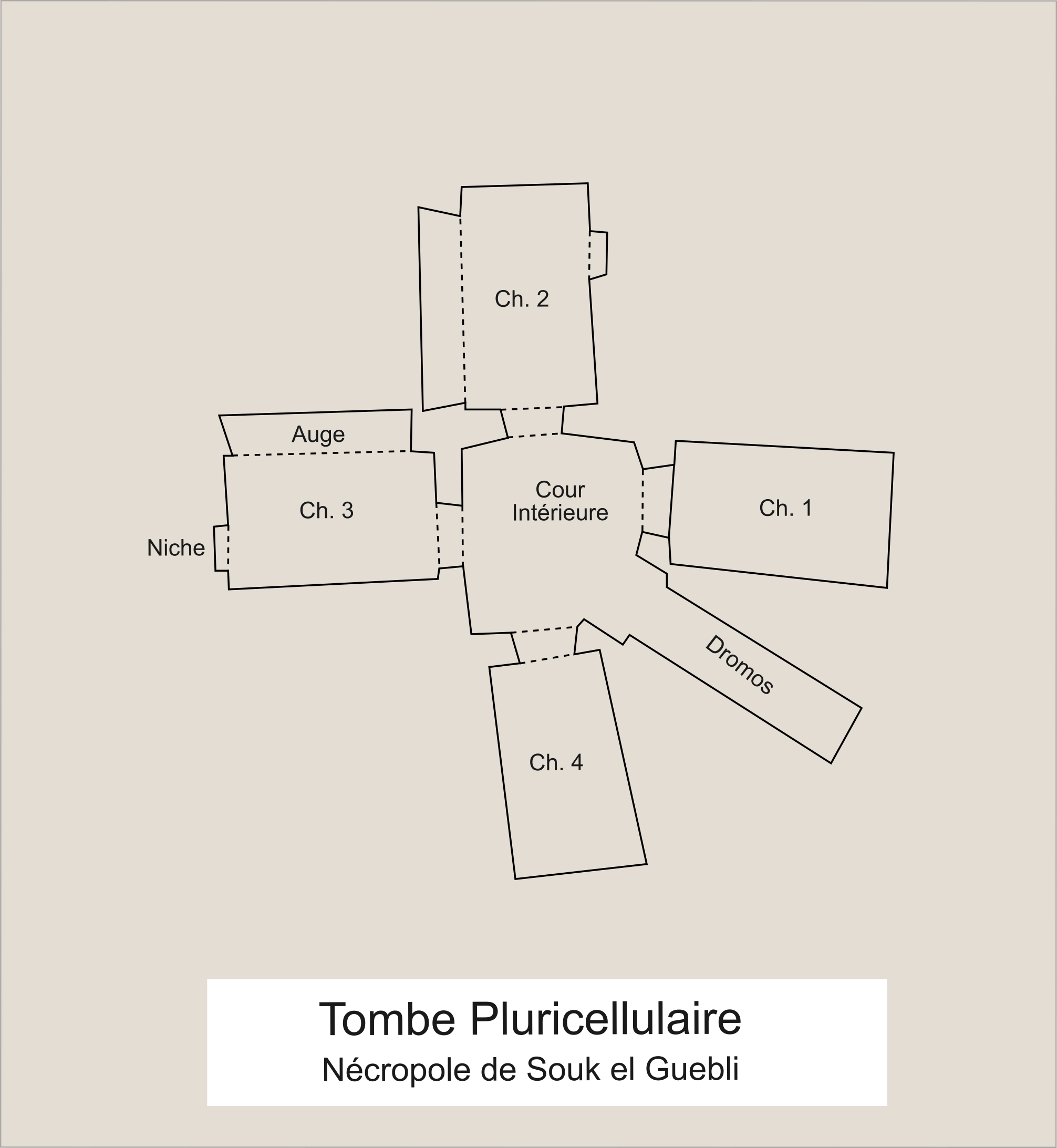
Necropolis of Souk el Guebli.

The inner courtyard, roughly square, measures 2.04 m per side. The absence of notches or grooves in the upper part indicates that it was not covered. On each of its sides open the entrances to the funerary chambers.

The chambers display varied characteristics:

- Chamber 1: located to the right of the dromos, accessible through a small opening, quadrangular in plan 2.47 m x 1.50 m. It was closed by a monolithic slab.
- Chamber 2: similar in size, containing a quadrangular niche and a trough carved into the wall thickness.
- Chamber 3: slightly offset from the courtyard, measuring 2.54 m x 1.53 m, with a niche and a horizontal trapezoidal trough.
- *Chamber 4: rectangular 2.46 m x 1.52 m, also with an off‑centre entrance.

Such an arrangement is unprecedented in Tunisia; only partial parallels exist at Thapsus and Rejiche. The use of the tomb spans from the 3rd century BC to the 2nd century AD.

This discovery enriches the understanding of the Punic funerary landscape of Jerba, already marked by great architectural diversity. Compared with the necropoleis of Ghizène, Ouled Amor, Souq el‑Guebli, Mellita, or Agga, this tomb stands out for its distinctly more Hellenised character.

=== Ghardaïa temple‑mausoleum ===
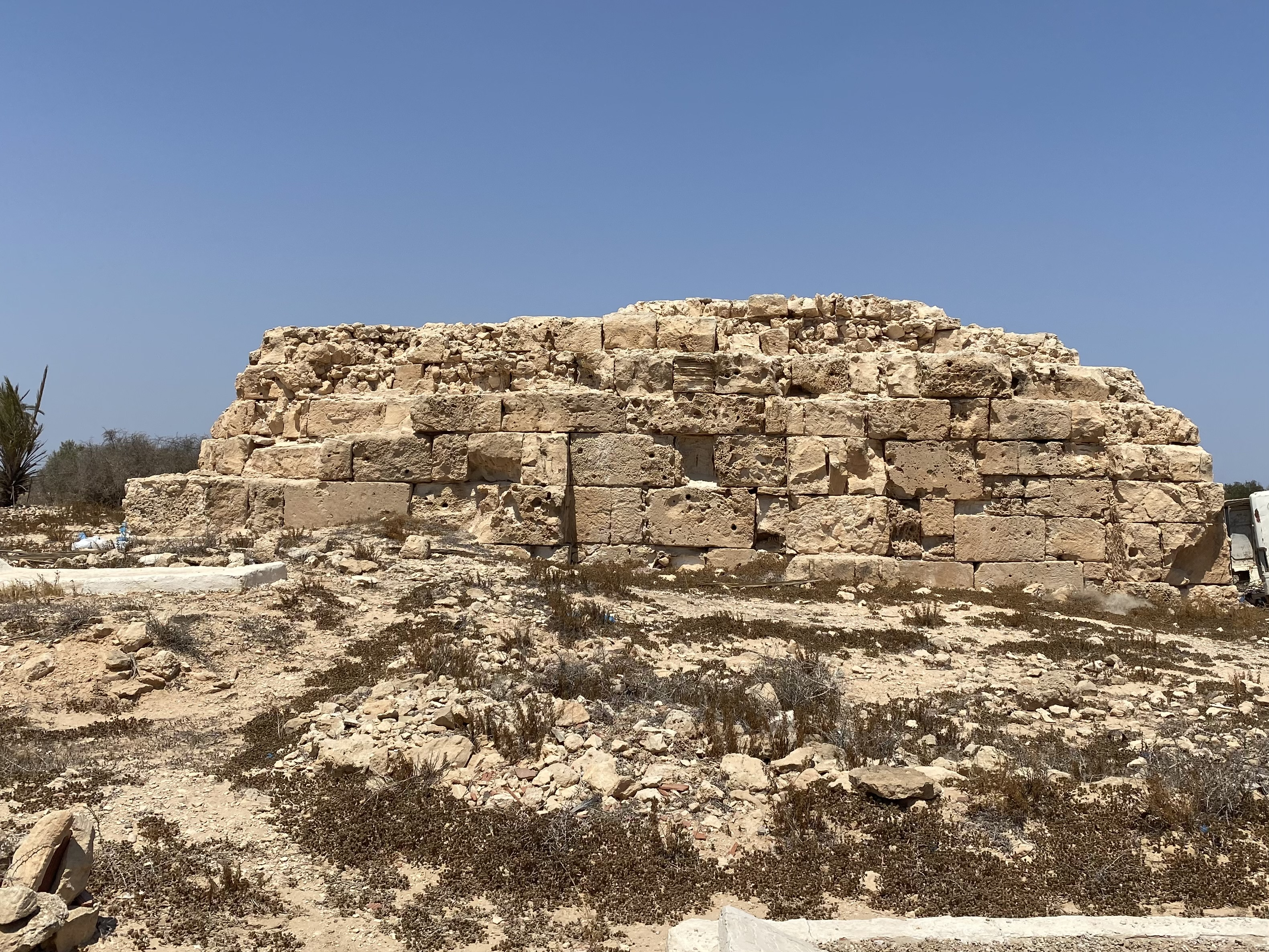
Exterior view.

From the outside, the monument appears as a large cubic block with a square base, its blind walls built of large, carefully cut orthostates. This quadrangular platform, 13.78 m per side and preserved to a height of 4.16 m, consists of six clearly visible courses. Each of its faces is reinforced by a powerful buttress.

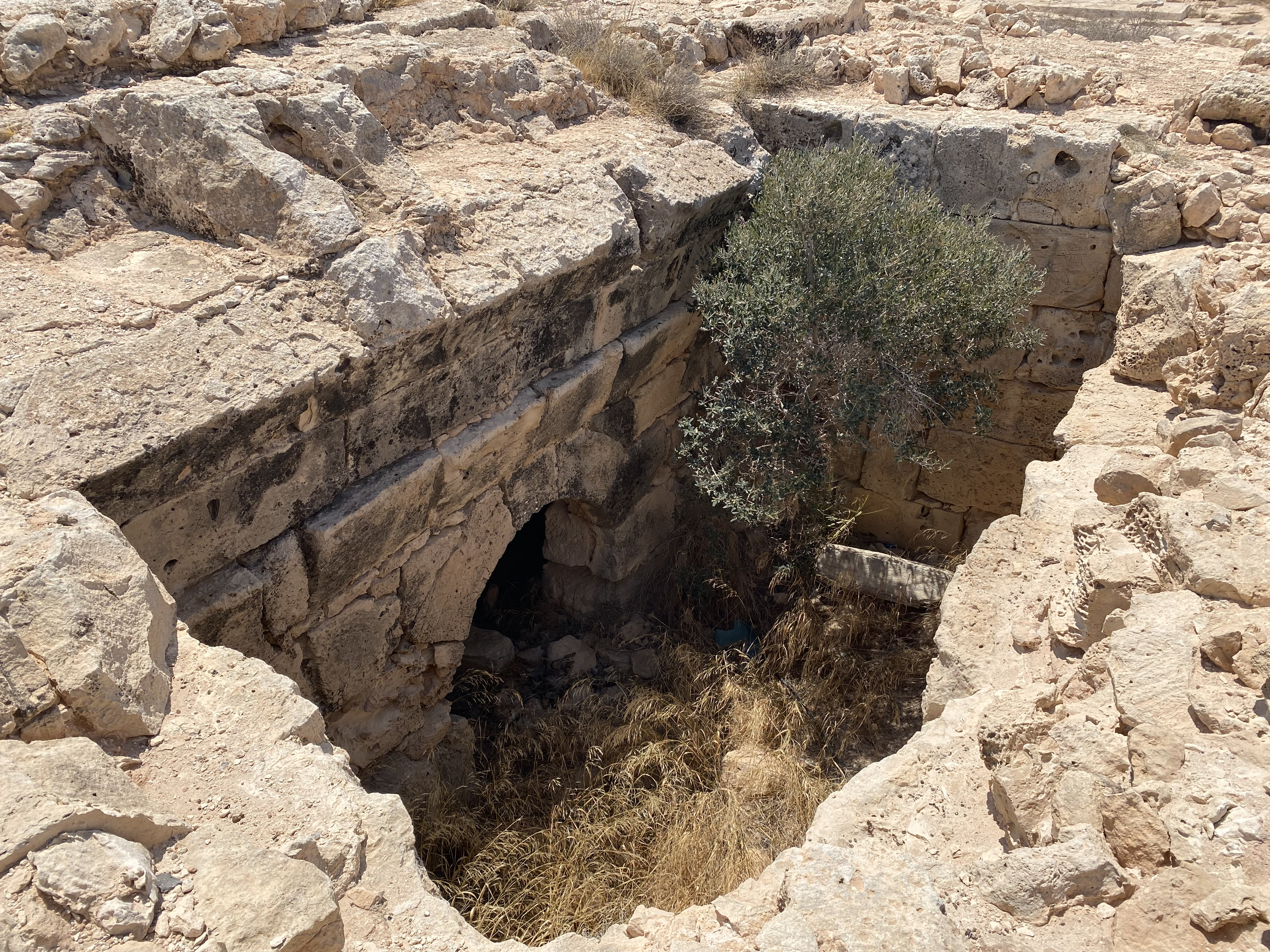
Subterranean structures.

Inside, the substructure contains a set of underground features: two rectangular chambers originally covered by barrel vaults. The western chamber measures 4.7 m long, 2.6 m wide, and 3 m high. It communicates with the eastern chamber through a rectangular opening 1.36 m high and 70 cm wide, whose upper part forms a semicircular arch composed of seven voussoirs. The eastern chamber has the same width and height but is shorter 3.1 m. Both rooms share the same floor level. The external access to this ensemble remains unknown; all evidence suggests that once constructed and used, the two crypts were permanently sealed.

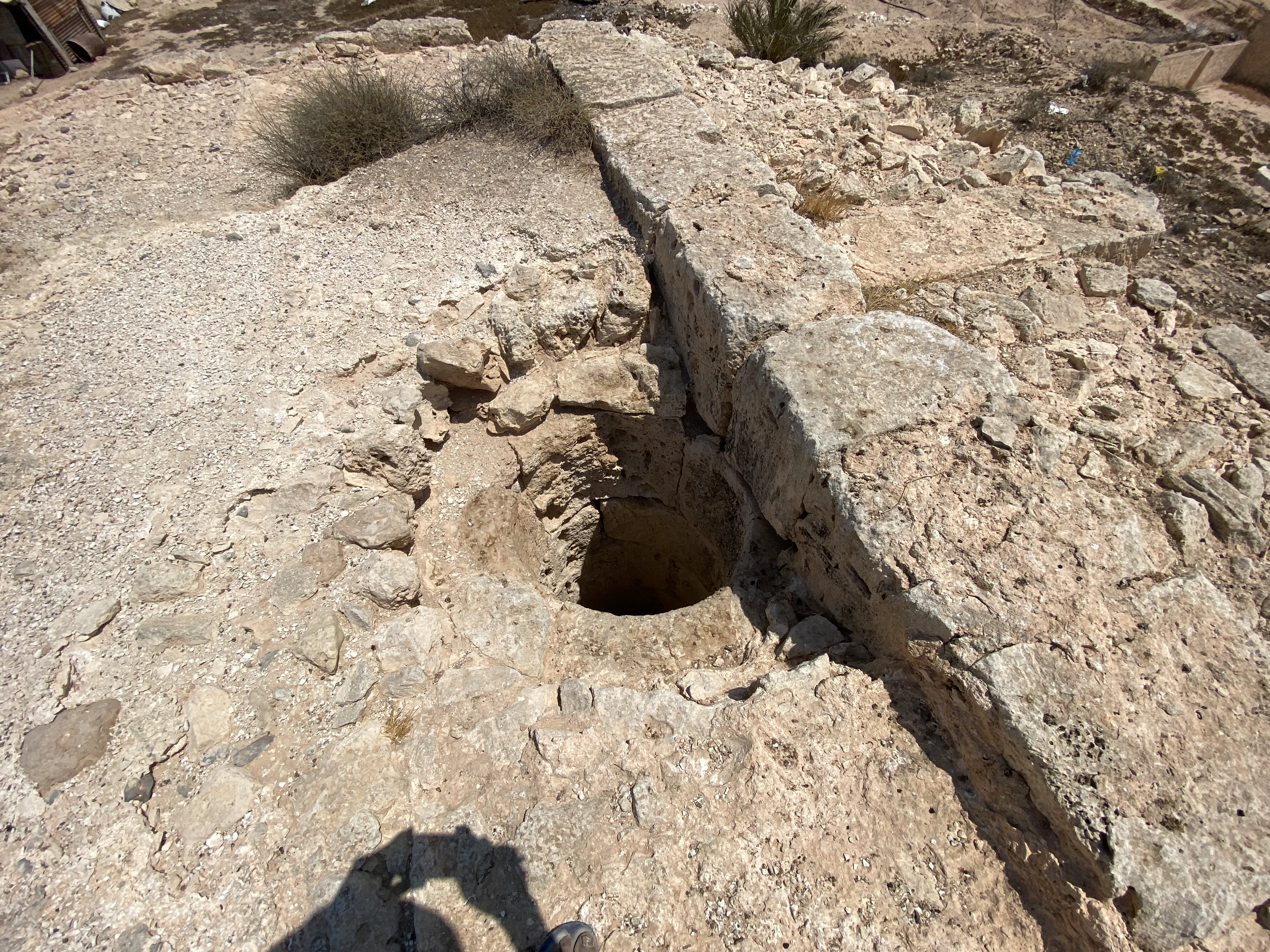
Well.

Originally, the building had at least two levels: the substructure housing the crypts, and an upper storey equipped with hydraulic installations directly connected to the underground structures. At the top of the substructure, on the right, is the circular opening of a well 0.80 m in diameter and 7 m deep. To the north, west, and south, traces of a hydraulic floor belonging to a basin remain, intended to collect, among other things, water from the well. To the south‑southeast, a terracotta channel framed by two parallel rows of cut blocks begins. At the western end, the remains of another rock‑cut conduit are visible. A third conduit corresponds to a masonry water supply covered with stone slabs.

The two crypts were very likely funerary in function. The presence of such an elaborate hydraulic system suggests a complex ritual designed to honour the memory of high‑ranking individuals whose bodies were placed in this monumental collective tomb. The ensemble therefore invites interpretation not merely as a mausoleum but as a sacred structure of the hērōon type — a true temple‑mausoleum intended to celebrate and sacralise the memory of illustrious figures.

=== Hypogea of Meninx ===
In 1942, Paul‑Marie Duval mentioned Punic hypogea cut into the rock, located one kilometre from the port of the Roman causeway, in the direction of Guellala.

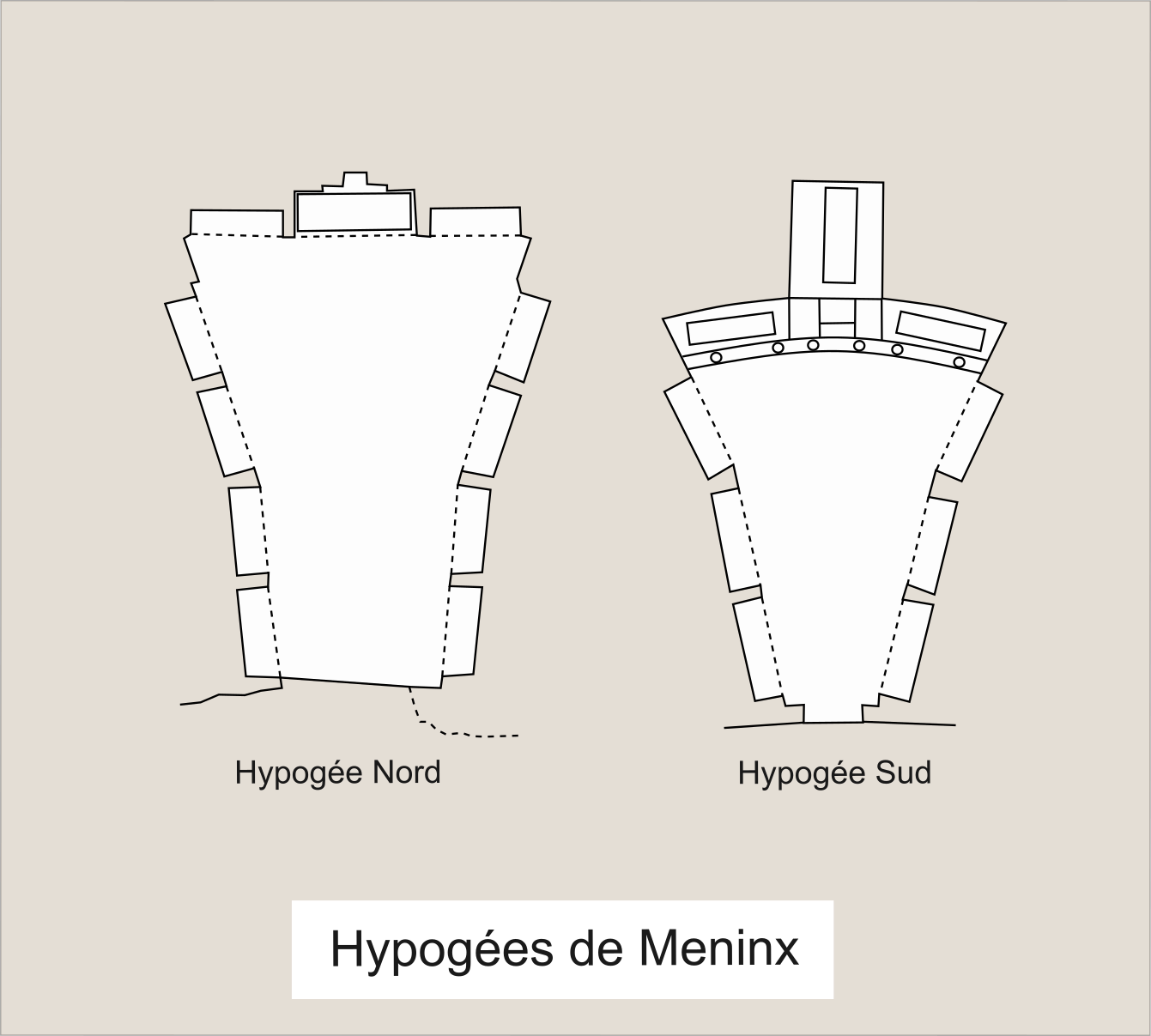
Plan of the hypogeum.

These consist of two funerary chambers carved into highly weathered Quaternary limestone, which, despite their deterioration, preserve a readable plan. Juxtaposed, oriented westwards, and trapezoidal in layout, they share the same funerary conception while presenting certain differences.

==== Southern hypogeum ====
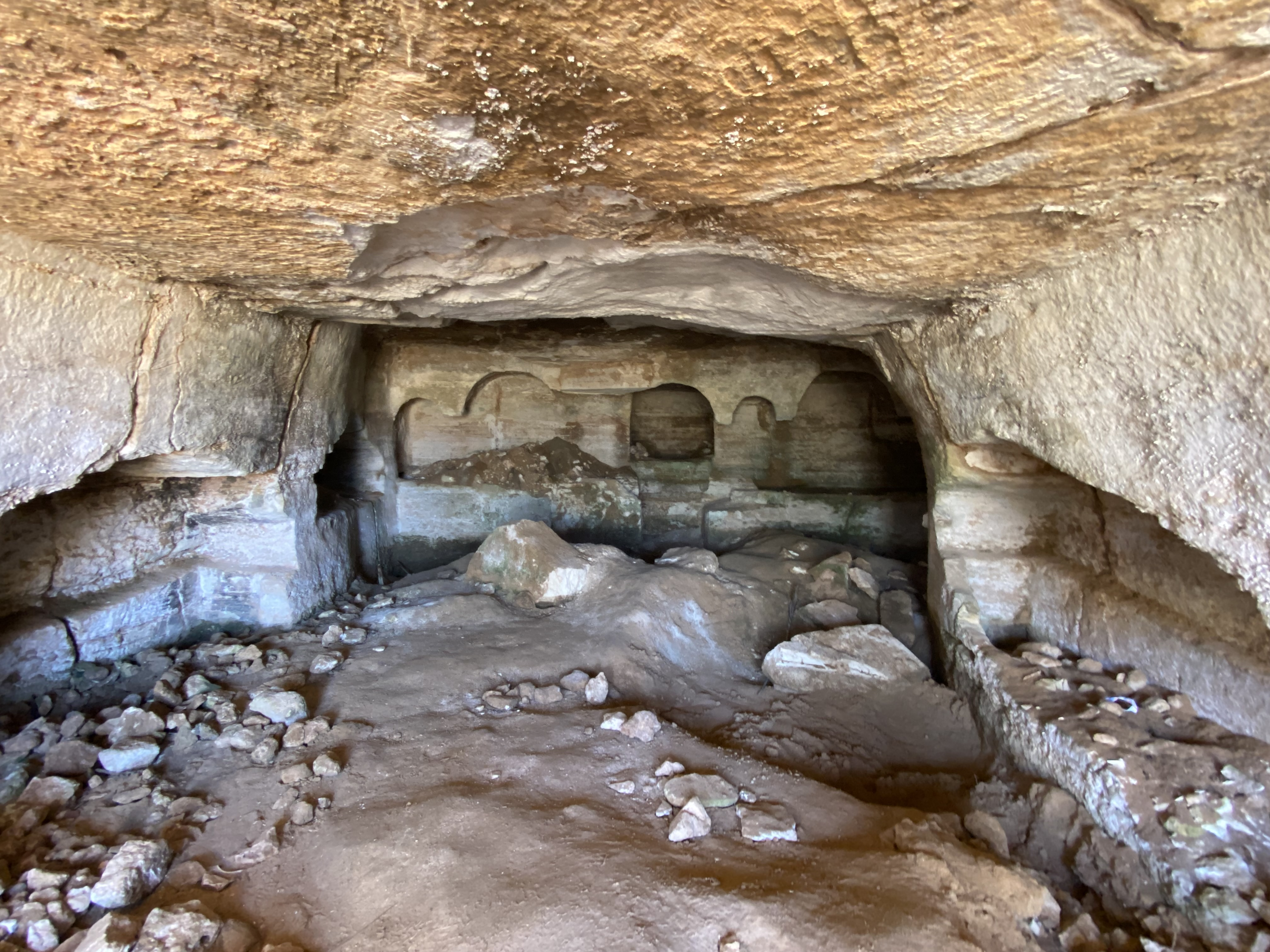
Southern hypogeum.

The hypogeum opens through a rectangular entrance leading to an underground chamber 10 m long, 1.95 m wide at the entrance and 7 m at the back, and 2.40 m high. Three tombs are carved into each of the north, east, and south walls; those on the north and south sides, shaped as trough‑sarcophagi topped with a gabled roof, show grooves for closing slabs. At the back, a colonnade of seven arches precedes two tombs, with a third set further back and accessible by three rock‑cut steps. To the right of the staircase opens a square well bordered by a flat rim.

==== Northern hypogeum ====
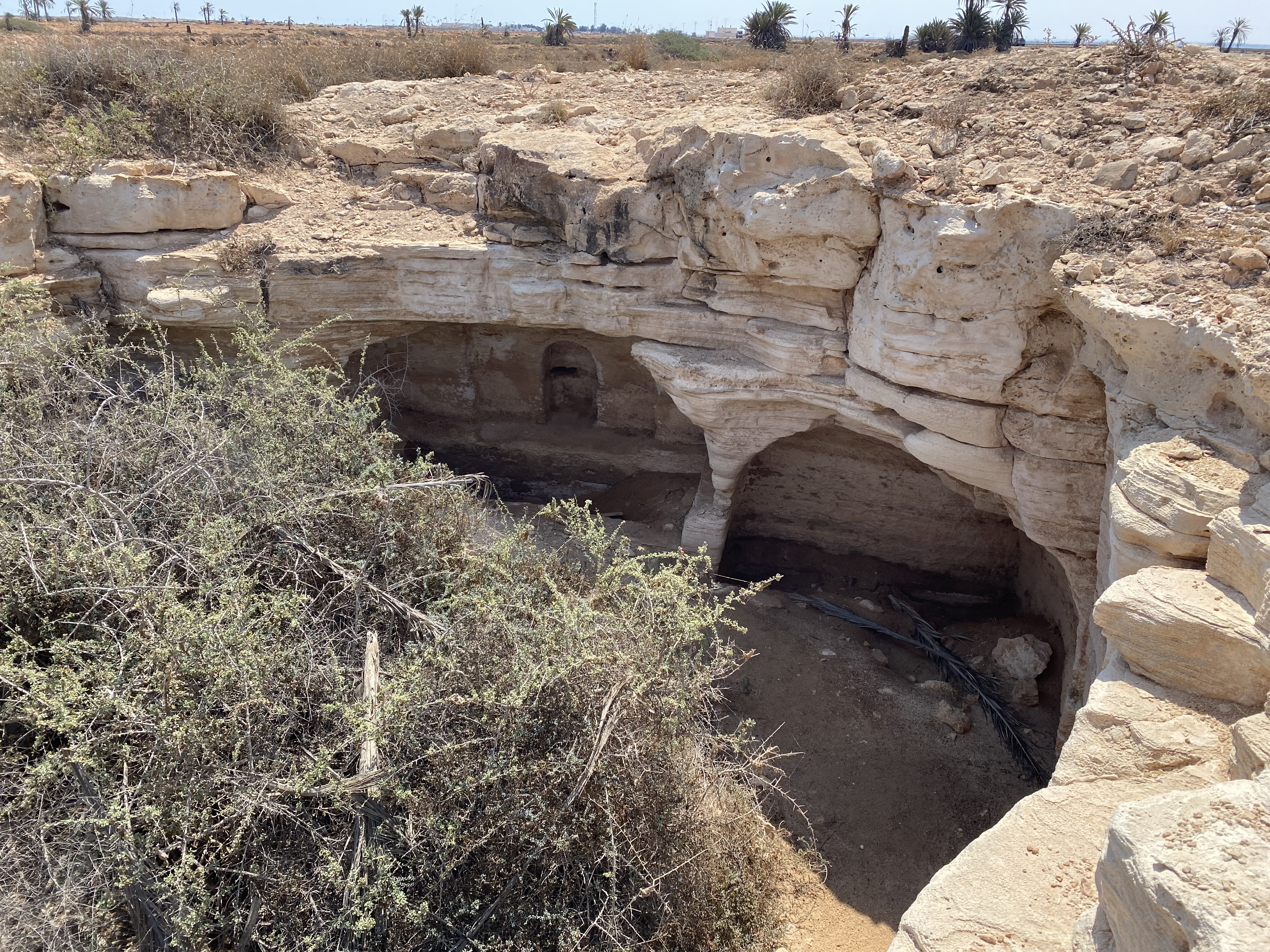
Northern hypogeum.

Much less well preserved than the previous one, this hypogeum has completely lost its roof: only an open‑air trapezoidal area remains, oriented westwards. The north, east, and south walls contain a series of rounded arcosolia (four, three, and four respectively). In the eastern wall, the central tomb is preceded by a niche carved into the rock. The chamber measures 10 m on the north and south sides, 7 m on the east, and 4.50 m on the west. Despite its very degraded condition, one can distinguish a bench in front of the niche and arcosolia framed by squat pillars carved with pseudo‑capitals, forming an arcaded façade on three sides.

=== Ouled Amor ===
Discovered at Trifa, in the northeast of Djerba, these three *haouanet* constitute the only known protohistoric remains on the island. Dated to the Numidian period, these rock‑cut tombs display singular forms and arrangements — absence of niches, atypical benches, oval shapes — suggesting a local adaptation of Libyan funerary models. Their originality sheds light on regional rock‑cut traditions and enriches the understanding of North African funerary practices.

=== Ghizène ===
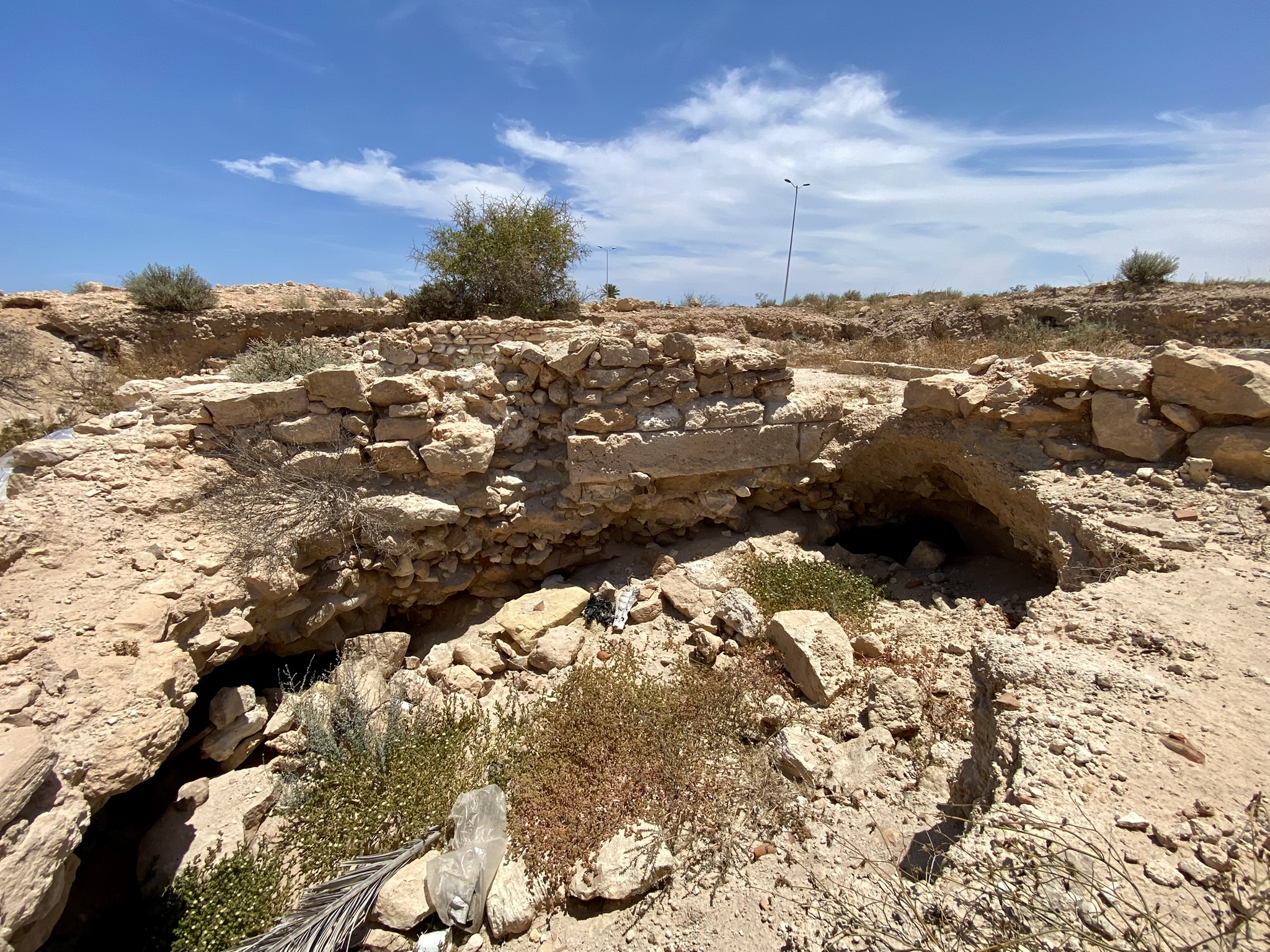
Archeological site of Ghizène

Located near Mezraya, in the northeast of Djerba, this Libyco‑Punic necropolis was occupied from the 4th century BC to the VIth century.

The rock‑cut tombs, often tripartite (shaft, staircase, chamber), display varied forms and attest to both inhumation and cremation rites. The funerary assemblage includes ceramics, amphorae, lamps, coins, and unguentaria. The presence of *murex* indicates artisanal activity linked to purple dye production. This site illustrates a synthesis between Libyan traditions and Punic influences, highlighting the importance of Ghizène in the funerary and economic landscape of the island.

=== Agga ===
Located near the Jama El Kébir mosque, in the northwest of Djerba, these tombs represent a rare example of built funerary architecture from the Phoenico‑Punic period. Constructed in sandy limestone, they consist of a single funerary chamber accessible through a rectangular opening topped by a triangular pediment. The gabled roof rests on lateral cornices, with a recessed niche at the back. Dated to the 2nd century BC, they reflect a local adaptation of Carthaginian models and attest to a lasting Punic presence on the island.

=== Mellita ===
In the northwest of Djerba, the funerary landscape of Mellita has yielded several Punic‑period rock‑cut tombs, now lost. Three burial chambers are documented: one with an oblong shaft and lateral staircase; another with an L‑shaped plan and two chambers; and the “hypogeum of Mellita,” excavated in 1969, featuring a trapezoidal chamber with wall niches. The associated finds (amphorae, urns, lamps, unguentaria) attest to a late Punic tradition with reuse during the Roman period. These structures illustrate the typological diversity of tombs and the cultural continuity between the Punic and Imperial periods.

=== Marguène ===
Discovered accidentally in 2006, the Marguène tomb is an exceptional funerary complex dating from the Roman Republican period (2nd–1st century BC). It consists of a dromos, a central chamber preceded by an entrance surmounted by a libation trough, and two burial chambers. Despite modern disturbances, the complex preserves architectural and ritual elements revealing pre‑Augustan funerary practices in Africa. The tomb was reused in the 1st century AD for new burials and commemorative ceremonies, indicating cultic and familial continuity.

== Rural and defensive sites ==
=== Henchir Lalla Thala ===
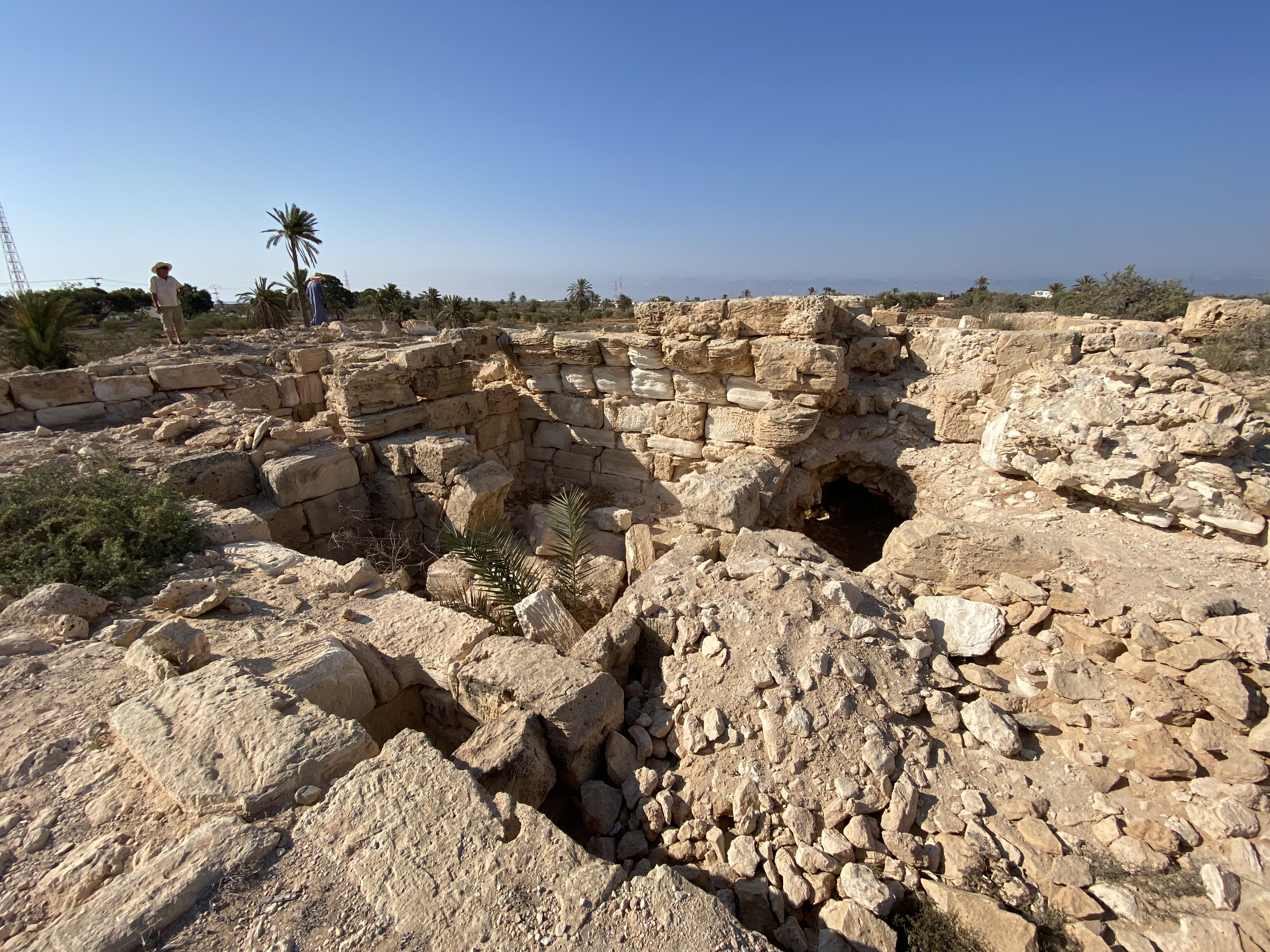
Fort of Lalla Thala in Djerba.

Located on the road between Sedouikech and El Kantara, this ancient surveillance post occupies a strategic position overlooking an axis linking the island's interior to the ancient city of Meninx. Built in cut earth blocks, the structure displays a sober and functional architecture typical of Late Antique defensive installations. It includes two vaulted underground rooms and a central well, characteristic features of rudimentary military forts. Measuring 14 m x9 m, the building underwent modifications, probably during the Vandal period, suggesting reuse for territorial control. This type of structure illustrates the modest yet effective systems established to monitor access routes to Djerba's urban and commercial centres.

=== Mezraya ===
Located on the northeast coast of Djerba, the site of Mezraya revealed, during preventive excavations in 2018, a continuous occupation sequence from Protohistory to the Roman Imperial period. The earliest levels yielded domestic structures and handmade pottery, reflecting a settlement rooted in local traditions. From the Punic period onward, the site opened to Mediterranean exchange, as shown by imported amphorae and fine tableware. In the Roman period, Mezraya became a structured rural establishment, likely linked to agriculture and textile production, with remains in *opus africanum*, cisterns, and storage installations. Abandoned in the 3rd century AD, the site illustrates the evolution of a vernacular settlement toward progressive integration into Djerba's ancient economic networks.

=== Henchir Tawrirt ===
The site of Henchir Tawrirt, located in the southeast of Djerba, reveals a multi‑layered occupation from Protohistory to the Roman period. Archaeological investigations conducted between 2006 and 2008 identified three main sectors:

- Protohistoric sector: characterised by hut floors with postholes, hearths, storage pits, and an original material culture. The archaeological assemblage includes basket‑impressed pottery, querns, loom weights, and lithic tools, reflecting a well‑structured agro‑pastoral society.
- Punic sector: marked by the construction of a herringbone wall, imported Carthaginian and Greek amphorae, and evidence of Mediterranean trade as early as the 5th century BC.
- Roman sector: dominated by a rural villa built between the late 1st and early 2nd centuries AD, with agricultural production facilities and kilns for amphora manufacture.

=== Guellala ===
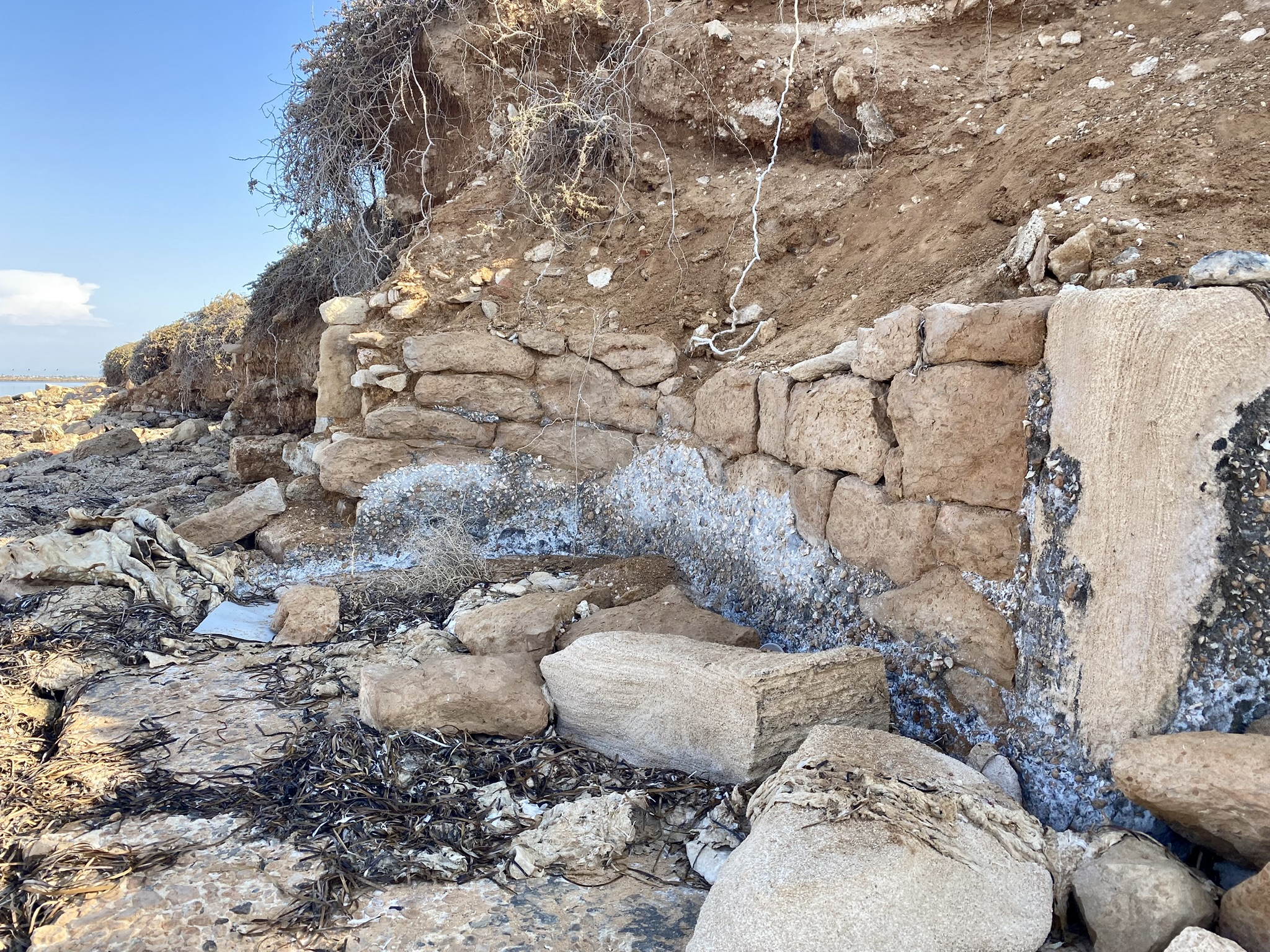

Identified with ancient Haribus mentioned in the Tabula Peutingeriana, the site of Guellala is located on the southwest coast of Djerba, south of the Gulf of Boughrara. Archaeological surveys conducted in 2018 reveal continuous occupation from the 5th century BC to the second half of the 7th century AD. Thanks to its strategic position on the maritime route linking Djerba to Tripolitania, Guellala played an active role in Mediterranean exchange, as shown by imported ceramics from Africa and other regions.

The site displays a complex spatial organisation structured into three main archaeological sectors:

- Punic sector: located on the shoreline, showing dense occupation from the 5th century BC, with remains linked to artisanal and commercial activities, notably purple‑dye production.
- Harbour sector: recently located about 300 m from the present coastline, consisting of a rectangular jetty built of local stone blocks, indicating the existence of an ancient harbour facilitating maritime trade.
- Roman sector: comprising the ancient public centre, brick‑making workshops, and a necropolis located in the modern village of Tlet.

Two clay‑cut tombs have been identified, one of which was excavated in 2014.

=== Mahboubine ===
An ancient well located about one kilometre from the locality of Mahboubine is built with the soft stones characteristic of the region. It has a diameter of 0.95 metres and an estimated original depth of about 35 m, comparable to contemporary wells. Attempts by local inhabitants to clear it were halted at 16 m due to the deterioration of the masonry in the lower levels.
