= Christiane Gruber =

American art historian

- Occupation: Art historian
- Awards: Guggenheim Fellowship (2015)

Academic background
- Education: Princeton University (BA); University of Pennsylvania (MA and PhD)
- Thesis: The Prophet Muhammad's Ascension (Mi‘raj) in Islamic Art and Literature, 1300-1600 (2005)
- Doctoral advisor: Renata Holod

Academic work
- Discipline: Art history
- Sub-discipline: Islamic art
- Institutions: Indiana University Bloomington; University of Michigan

Christiane Jacqueline Gruber is an American art historian. A 2015 Guggenheim Fellow, she specializes in Islamic art, and has authored and edited well over a dozen books, including The Islamic Manuscript Tradition (2009) and The Praiseworthy One (2019). She is Mehmet Ağa-Oğlu Collegiate Professor of Islamic Art History at the University of Michigan, and was president-elect of the Historians of Islamic Art Association from 2020 until June 2021.

== Biography ==
Gruber attended Princeton University, where she obtained her BA in art history in 1998, and the University of Pennsylvania, where she obtained her MA in Islamic architecture in 2001 and her PhD in Islamic art history in 2005. Her doctoral dissertation The Prophet Muhammad's Ascension (Mi‘raj) in Islamic Art and Literature, 1300-1600 was supervised by Renata Holod.

In 2005, Gruber became an assistant professor at Indiana University Bloomington. She moved to University of Michigan as an associate professor in 2011, before being promoted to full professor in 2018. In 2019, she was promoted to chair of the Department of the History of Art, serving until 2022. She was the Rudolf Arnheim Visiting Professor at the Humboldt University of Berlin for the spring 2012 semester, as well as a visiting directeur d'études at Sorbonne University.

Gruber specializes in Islamic art. She won the Historians of Islamic Art Association's 2005 Margaret B. Ševčenko Prize for Best Article on Islamic Art for her article on the Ilkhanid Mi'rāj-nāma. She has authored and edited well over a dozen books, including The Islamic Manuscript Tradition (2009) and The Praiseworthy One (2019). Another book, The Ilkhanid Book of Ascension (2011), received an honorable mention for the British-Kuwait Friendship Society's 2011 Middle East Book Prize.

Gruber was editor of H-Net's H-Islamart from 2008 to May 2010 and was president-elect of the Historians of Islamic Art Association from 2020 until June 2021. In 2015, she was awarded a Guggenheim Fellowship. She is creator of the open-access Islamic art education platform Khamseen: Islamic Art History Online.

Gruber has written articles for The Brooklyn Rail, The Conversation, Jadaliyya, New Lines Magazine, Newsweek, and Prospect. She protested the 2022 termination of a Hamline University art professor who showed images of Muhammad, collecting nearly 20,000 signatures for a Change.org petition.

== Works ==
=== Monographs ===
- The Timurid Book of Ascension (Mi‘rajnama): A Study of Text and Image in a Pan-Asian Context (2008)
- The Ilkhanid Book of Ascension: A Persian-Sunni Devotional Tale (2010)
- The Praiseworthy One: The Prophet Muhammad in Islamic Texts and Images (2018)
- Osmanlı Islam Sanatında Tapınma ve Tılsım (2020)
- (with Michelle Al-Ferzly) City in the Desert, Revisited: Oleg Grabar at Qasr al-Hayr al-Sharqi, 1964-71 (2021)

=== Edited volumes ===
- The Islamic Manuscript Tradition: Ten Centuries of Book Arts in Indiana University Collections (2009) (Note: Reviews of this book:)
- (with Sune Haugbolle) Visual Culture in the Modern Middle East: Rhetoric of the Image (2013)
- (with Edward Linenthal and Jonathan Hyman) The Landscapes of 9/11: A Photographer’s Journey (2013)
- (with Avinoam Shalem) The Image of the Prophet Between Ideal and Ideology: A Scholarly Investigation (2014)
- Islamic Architecture on the Move: Motion and Modernity (2016)
- The Image Debate: Figural Representation in Islam and Across the World (2019)
- (with Frederick Colby) The Prophet's Ascension: Cross-Cultural Encounters with the Islamic Mi'raj Tales (2019) (Note: Reviews of this book:)
- (with Bihter Esener) Regime Change: New Horizons in Islamic Art and Visual Culture (2024)

=== Exhibition catalogues ===
- Selections of Arabic, Persian, and Ottoman Calligraphy (2006)
- (with Ashley Dimmig) Pearls of Wisdom: The Arts of Islam at the University of Michigan (2014)
- Creative Dissent: Arts of the Arab World Uprisings (2013–2014)
- The Moon: A Voyage Through Time (2019)
