= The Praiseworthy One =

2018 non-fiction book by Christiane Gruber

The Praiseworthy One: The Prophet Muhammad in Islamic Texts and Images
- Author: Christiane Gruber
- Publisher: Indiana University Press
- Publication date: 2018
- Pages: 365
- ISBN: 978-0-253-02526-5
- OCLC: 1083783078

The Praiseworthy One: The Prophet Muhammad in Islamic Texts and Images is a book by Christiane Gruber. Published in 2018 by Indiana University Press, it is about the history of aniconism in Islam and depictions of Muhammad in Islamic art.

== General references ==
- Blankinship, Kevin (22 November 2019). "The Praiseworthy One". Times Literary Supplement. No. 6086. p. 38.
- Soucek, Priscilla (2020-07-02). "The Praiseworthy One: The Prophet Muhammad in Islamic Texts and Images, by Christiane Gruber: Bloomington: Indiana University Press, 2018. 408 pp.; 141 color ills. $60". The Art Bulletin. 102 (3): 138–140. doi:10.1080/00043079.2020.1755568. ISSN 0004-3079.
