= Edward Linenthal =

American academic

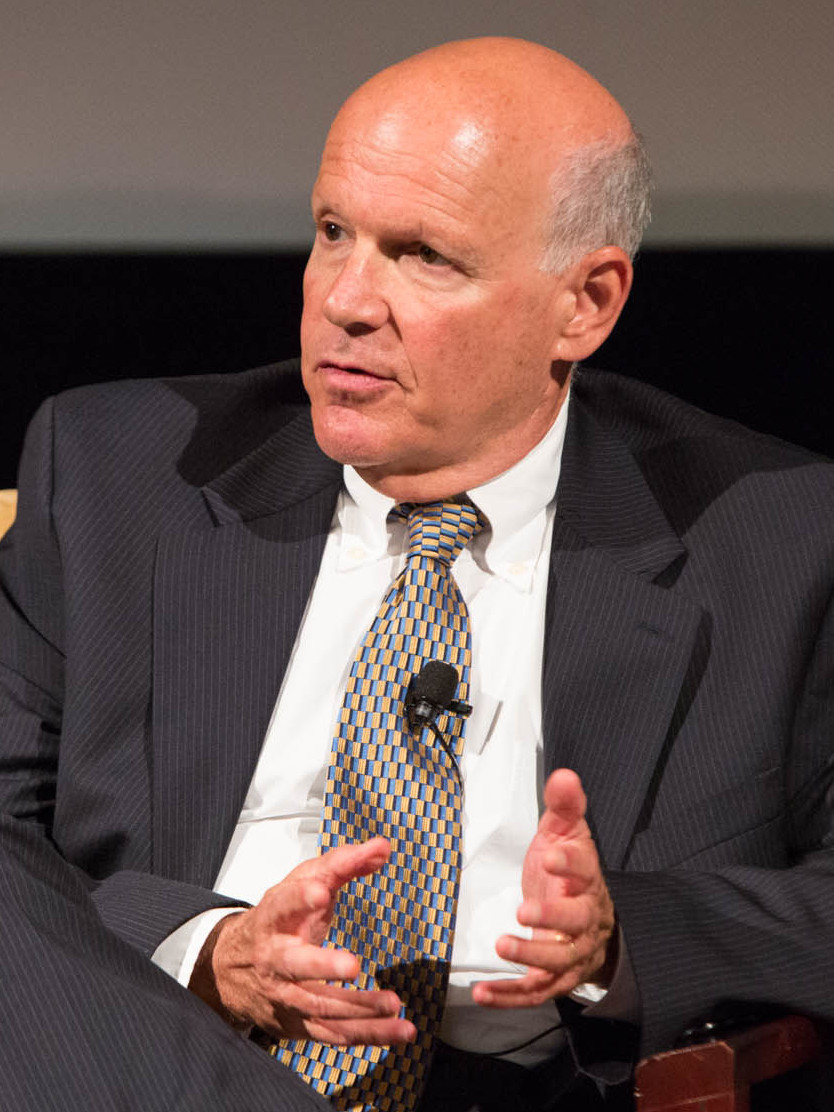
- Linenthal at the National Archives, June 2016
- Born: November 6, 1947 (age 78); Boston, Massachusetts

Academic background
- Education: Western Michigan University; Pacific School of Religion; University of California, Santa Barbara

Edward Tabor ("Ed") Linenthal (born 1947) is an American academic who specializes in religious and American studies, and particularly memorials and other sacred spaces.

== Biography and scholarship ==
Linenthal received his A.B. from Western Michigan University in 1969, his M.Div. from the Pacific School of Religion in 1973, and his Ph.D. from the University of California, Santa Barbara in 1979. He worked for 25 years at the University of Wisconsin–Oshkosh, in religious studies and completed his career with the Indiana University history department. Now retired, Linenthal now resides in Virginia.

In his youth, Linenthal played drums for a rock band called The Thyme who often opened for well known acts such as Jimi Hendrix, Janis Joplin, Cream, The Who, and MC5 at the Grande Ballroom (where The Thyme served as a house band) and The Union Street Station among other locations.

Linenthal is the author of four scholarly monographs, and has served as the editor-in-chief of The Journal of American History. One of his research interests is "sacred ground", that is, the places that are sanctified by sacrifice of one sort of another (and later frequently commercialized)--this is the topic of his Sacred Ground, an interest which led to an involvement with the Flight 93 National Memorial in Shanksville, Pennsylvania. He is a consultant with the National Park Service, and has worked on such memorials as the United States Holocaust Memorial Museum; his Preserving Memory (first published 1995) describes various controversies and debates pertaining to the planning and building of the museum.

== Books ==
=== Authored ===
- The Unfinished Bombing: Oklahoma City in American Memory (New York: Oxford University Press, 2001)
- Preserving Memory: The Struggle to Create America’s Holocaust Museum (2nd ed, New York: Columbia University Press, 2001)
- Sacred Ground: Americans and Their Battlefields (2nd ed, Champaign: University of Illinois Press, 1993)
- Symbolic Defense: the Cultural Significance of the Strategic Defense Initiative (Champaign: University of Illinois Press, 1989)

=== Edited ===
- With Jonathan Hyman and Christiane Gruber, The Landscapes of 9/11: A Photographer's Journey (Austin: University of Texas Press, 2013)
- With Tom Engelhardt, History Wars: The Enola Gay and Other Battles for the American Past. New York: Metropolitan Books (1996)
- With David Chidester, American Sacred Space (Bloomington: Indiana University Press, 1995)
