= Renata Holod =

Historian of art and architecture and archaeologist of the Islamic world

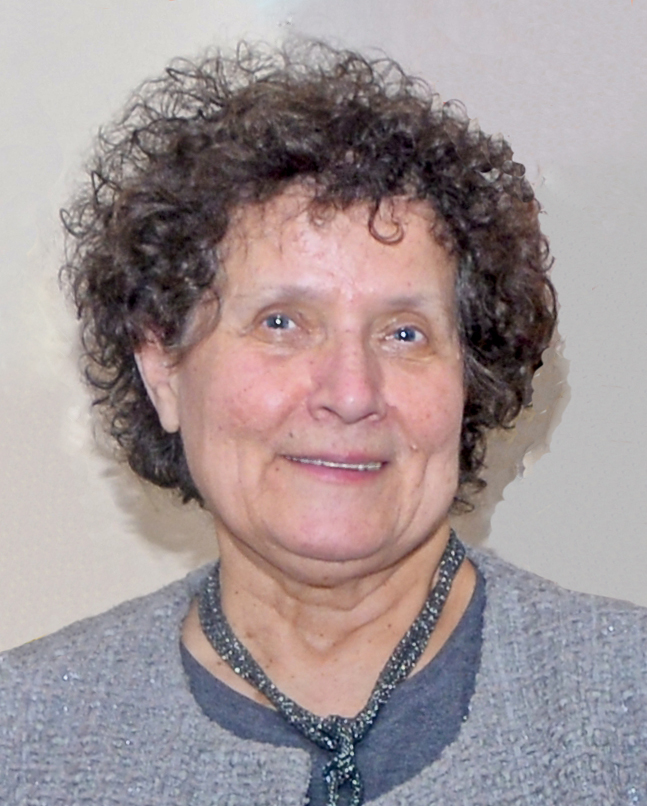
Renata Holod in 2017

Renata Holod is an American art historian, architecture historian and archaeologist, specializing in the Islamic world. She is the College for Women Class of 1963 Term Professor Emerita in the Humanities in the History of Art Department, and current Curator of the Near East Section, Museum of Archaeology and Anthropology at the University of Pennsylvania. Holod has taught at University of Penn since 1972, and was a visiting Clark Professor at Williams College in 2002. She has conducted and/or directed archaeological fieldwork in Iraq, Afghanistan, Syria, Iran, Morocco, Turkey, Ukraine, and Tunisia.

== Biography ==
Holod earned her B.A. degree in Islamic Studies at the University of Toronto in 1964; her M.A. in History of Art from the University of Michigan in 1965, and her Ph.D. in Fine Arts from Harvard University in 1972. As a professor, she has supervised over fifty Ph.D. theses from students in a range of fields, including History of Art, Architecture, Urban Planning, Religious Studies, Middle East Studies, and Art and Archaeology of the Mediterranean World.

In 1977, Holod was the Convenor of the Aga Khan Award for Architecture and Designer of the Award Procedures, served on the Steering Committee for the award in 1980-83 and 1993–96, and was Chair of the Master Jury in 1992. She has consulted on architectural projects in Iraq (the Abu Nuwas River Bank Project with Arthur Ericson Vancouver in 1981, and the Iraq State Mosque with Venturi, Rauch, Scott-Brown in 1982-83); the United States (The Islamic Cultural Center of New York, with Skidmore, Owings and Merrill 1986-88); and the United Arab Emirates (the Palm Jumeirah Gateway Bridge for The Palm Dubai with H2L2 in 2003).

As a curator, Holod has created exhibitions in the United States (including “'From the Two Pens’: Line and Color in Islamic Art” at Williams College Museum of Art, October–December 2002, “Archaeologists and Travelers in Ottoman Lands” at the Penn Museum, September 2010-June 2011) and Turkey (“Osman Hamdi Bey and The Americans: Art, Diplomacy, Archaeology” at the Pera Museum, Istanbul, October 2011-January 2012).

She serves on numerous advisory boards and committees, including the Advisory Board of Muqarnas: Annual in Islamic Art and Visual Culture (since 1999); the Scientific Committee of the Fondation Max Van Berchem (since 2001); the Advisory Board of the International Journal of Islamic Architecture (since 2012), and the Advisory Board of Arts Asiatiques (since 2012). Holod is a Senior Fellow of the Kolb Society at the Penn Museum (elected 1989), and has been honored with the King Fahd Award for Teaching the Architecture of Muslim Cultures (1986), the Islamic Environmental Design Achievement Award (2004), and the Provost’s Award for Mentorship of Graduate Students (2010). Her former students published a festschrift in her honor (Envisioning Islamic Art and Architecture: Essays in Honor of Renata Holod, edited by David J. Roxburgh) in 2014.
Prof. Holod has supervised and mentored over fifty students at various institutions, including the University of Pennsylvania, where she has overseen at least forty doctoral dissertations. Holod is a past President of the Historians of Islamic Art Association (2007–10). She has been member of the Board of Trustees of The Ukrainian Museum since 2011, and President since 2013.

== Works ==
- Architecture and Community: Building in the Islamic World Today (Aperture, 1983) ISBN 9780893811235
- (with Oleg Grabar, James Knustad, and William Trousdale) City in the Desert: Qasr al-Hayir East (Harvard University Press, 1978). ISBN 9780674131958
- (with Ahmet Evin) Modern Turkish Architecture (University of Pennsylvania Press, 1984) ISBN 9780812279252
- (with Hasan Uddin-Khan) The Mosque and the Modern World: Architects, Patrons and Designs Since the 1950s (Thames and Hudson, 1997) ISBN 9780500341551
- (with Salma Jayyusi, Attilio Petruccioli, and André Raymond) The City in the Islamic World (Brill, 2008) ISBN 9789004162402
