= Architecture in Maharashtra: Tradition and Journey =

2024 non-fiction book

- Editor: Narendra Dengle, Pushkar Sohoni, Chetan Sahasrabuddhe, Minal Sagare
- Language: English
- Subject: Architecture, Maharashtra
- Published: 2024
- Publisher: Maharashtra State Board for Literature and Culture
- Publication place: India
- Media type: Print (hardback)
- Pages: vol.1: 419 pages, vol.2: 441 pages

Architecture in Maharashtra: Tradition and Journey is a 2024 non-fiction book in two volumes, edited by Narendra Dengle, and co-edited by Pushkar Sohoni, Chetan Sahasrabuddhe, and Minal Sagare. It is a loose translation of a similar two-volume work in Marathi (महाराष्ट्रातील वास्तुकला: परंपरा आणि वाटचाल, द्विखंडात्मक) by the same authors and editors. The work is about architecture in Maharashtra, and how it should be seen and understood in its historic context. From the pre-historic period to contemporary times, architecture is the focus. The work was commissioned by the Maharashtra State Board of Literature and Culture.

== Synopsis ==
The first volume comprises essays by various authors. The second volume contains indexed entries of over three hundred sites and buildings in Maharashtra.

== Reception ==
The book has been received extremely well, both by the architecture community and also the press. Several events were organised to inaugurate the book, including one in Mumbai at the J.J. School of Architecture, and one in Pune organised by the Forum For Exchange and Excellence in Design (FEED). In 2025, several reviews of the book were published in most Marathi newspapers. The two volumes were also listed by various people in a list of recommendations. The journal of landscape architecture, Landscape, reviewed the book favourably.
