= Taming the Oriental Bazaar =

2022 book by Pushkar Sohoni

Taming the Oriental Bazaar Architecture of the Market-Halls of Colonial India
- Author: Pushkar Sohoni
- Language: English
- Subject: Art history, markets, Colonial architecture
- Published: 2022
- Publisher: Routledge
- Publication place: United Kingdom
- Media type: Print (hardback)
- Pages: x, 120 Pages, 28 B/W Illustrations
- ISBN: 9781032646114
- LC Class: NA3576.A1 S64 2022

Taming the Oriental Bazaar: Architecture of the Market-halls of Colonial India is a non-fiction book by Pushkar Sohoni about the origins of the modern market-hall in India. Born of colonial circumstances, such as the advent of the railways, the market-hall in India assumed a civic importance that was previously unknown. Further developments, such as the emergence of germ theory, and the opening of the Suez canal, led to the proliferation of this architectural type.

== Synopsis ==
The chapters in the book explains the rationale for the research, the history of market halls in India, and the conditions for their rise. Not only the presidency cities, but cantonment stations, provincial towns, and even settlements in the princely states had market-halls built quickly in the period between 1860 and 1940. A sampling of market halls from colonial British India is listed at the end, with an analysis of their planning and a categorisation of the types.

== Reception ==
The book has been reviewed by Prashant Kidambi in Nidan: International Journal for Indian Studies, where he commented that "this book should be seen as a spur to further research on the social and cultural history of specific genres of buildings that formed an indelible feature of colonial modernity." It has been cited in several studies of other colonial market-halls.

== See also ==
- Non-Shia Practices of Muḥarram in South Asia and the Diaspora
- Architecture of the Deccan sultanates
- Pushkar Sohoni
