= Tribal Museum Bhopal =

Museum of tribal art in Madhya Pradesh, India

Coordinates: 23.2344°N 77.3848°E

Madhya Pradesh State Tribal Museum
- Established: 6 June 2013; 13 years ago
- Location: Shymala Hills, Bhopal, Madhya Pradesh 462002
- Type: Anthropological museum
- Website: mptribalmuseum.com/english/

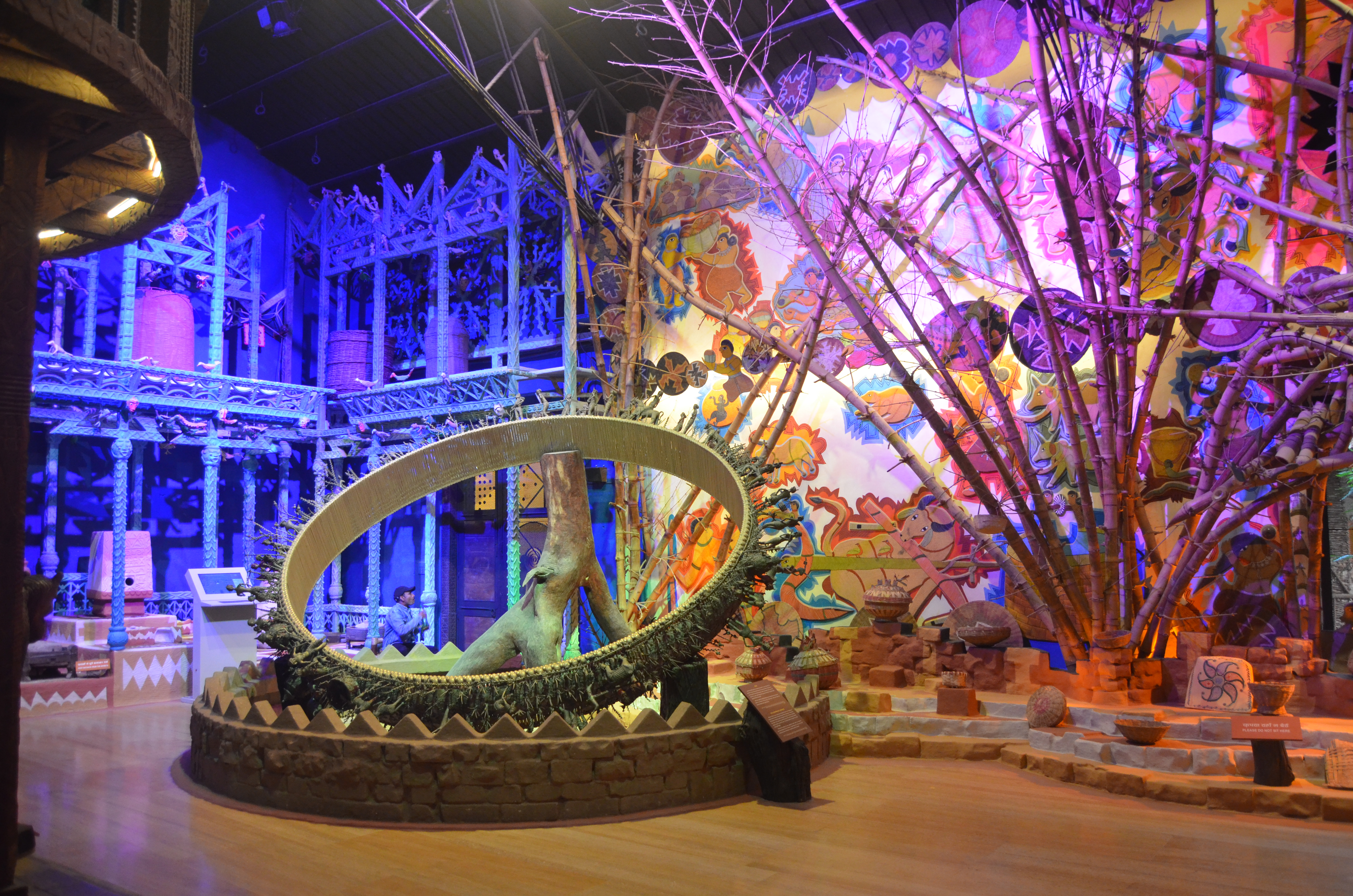
Madhya Pradesh Tribal Museum, Bhopal

The Tribal Museum of Bhopal or Madhya Pradesh Tribal Museum is located close to the State Museum, Bhopal, near the Museum of Man/ Museum of Mankind in the Indian state of Madhya Pradesh. This is a museum dedicated to the living aspects of tribal life, indigenous knowledge systems, and aesthetics.

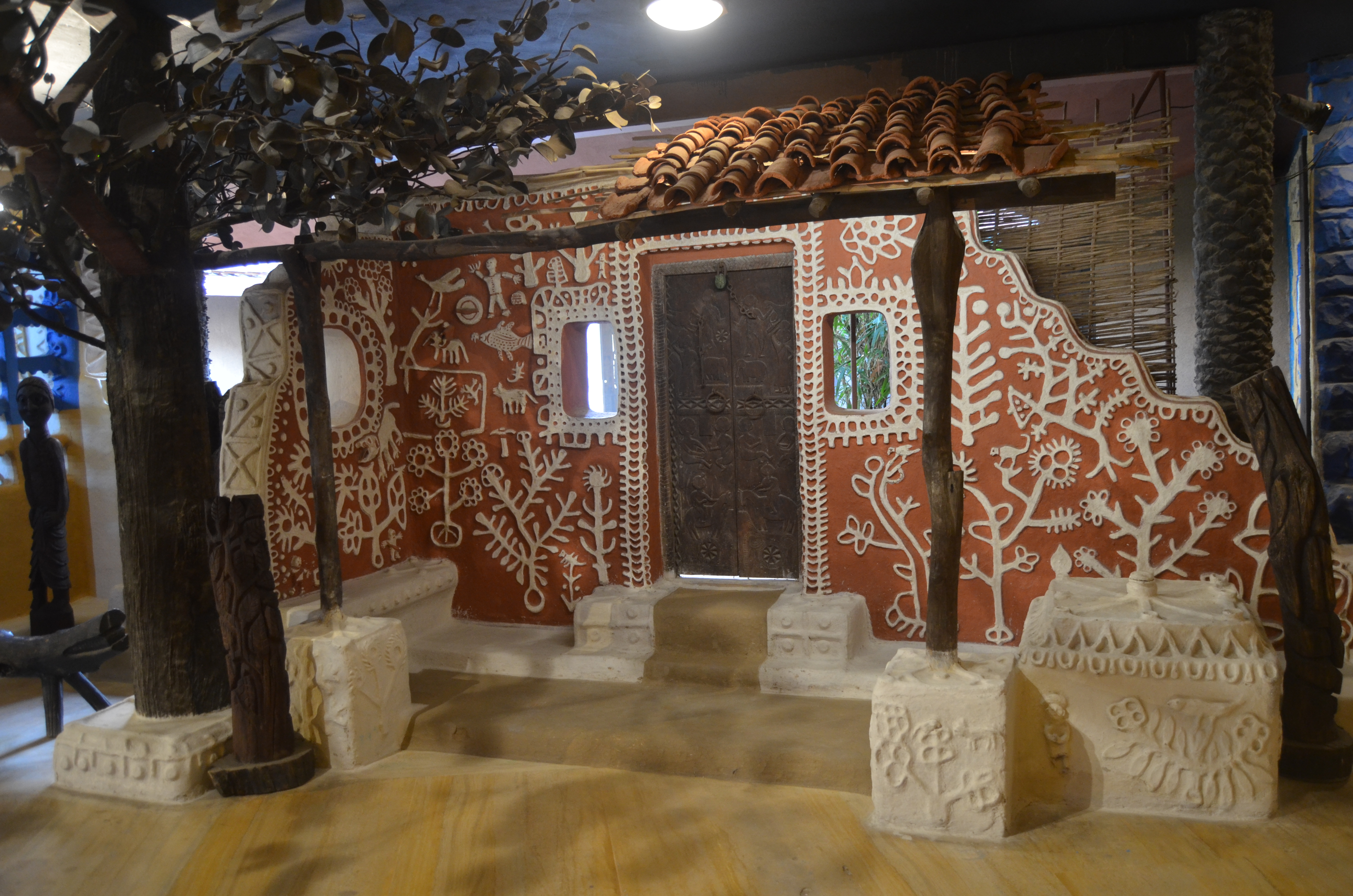

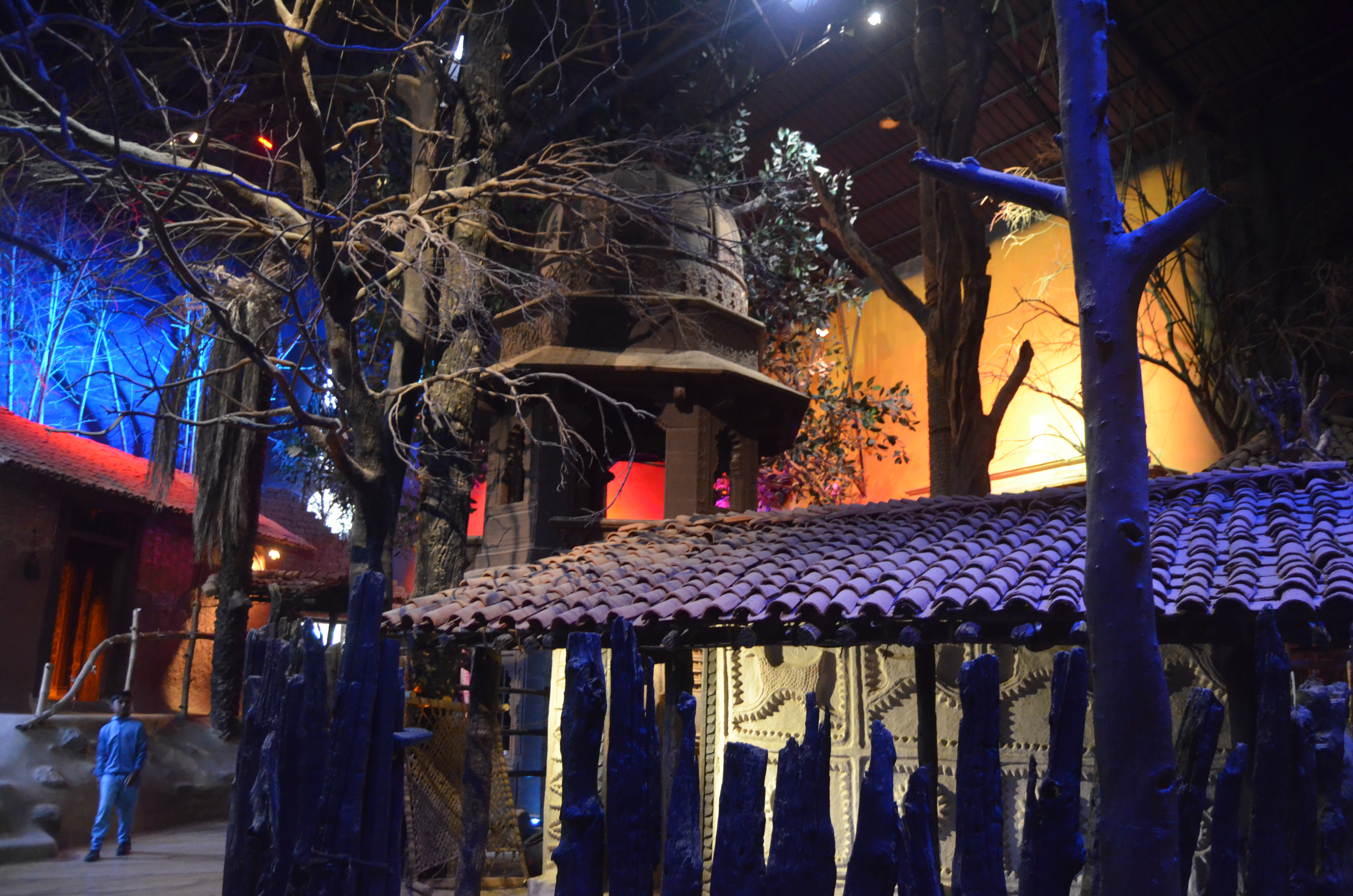

== Introduction ==
The tribal museum was designed by Revathi Kamath. It was inaugurated on June 6, 2013, by the then-president of India Pranab Mukherjee. The museum is divided into six different theme galleries showcasing traditional art, craft and culture of various tribes of Madhya Pradesh like Gonds, Bhils, Bharias, Sahariya, Korku, Kol, and Baiga. As of June 2022, the museum allows its visitors to access its exhibits and presentations virtually. The digital tour is categorised into ten parts: the upper and lower level of the museum, lifestyle gallery, tribal spiritual world, Chhattisgarh gallery, Awas (tribal housing), Likhandra (painting exhibition and library), Rakku (children gallery), and Chinhari (the museum shop). On May 18 2023, which was also International Museum Day, the Madhya Pradesh Tourism Board launched a QR-based audio guide to help tourists learn about the state's rich heritage and culture. Furthermore, considering the state of Madhya Pradesh recognises 43 different tribes, it has recently announced the launching of a "Cultural Diversity Centre". The overarching idea is to illustrate how despite the differences there are shared commonalities between the tribes found in the region.

The museum receives up to 71,000 visitors (66,000 Indian nationals – 5,000 foreign nationals) per year.

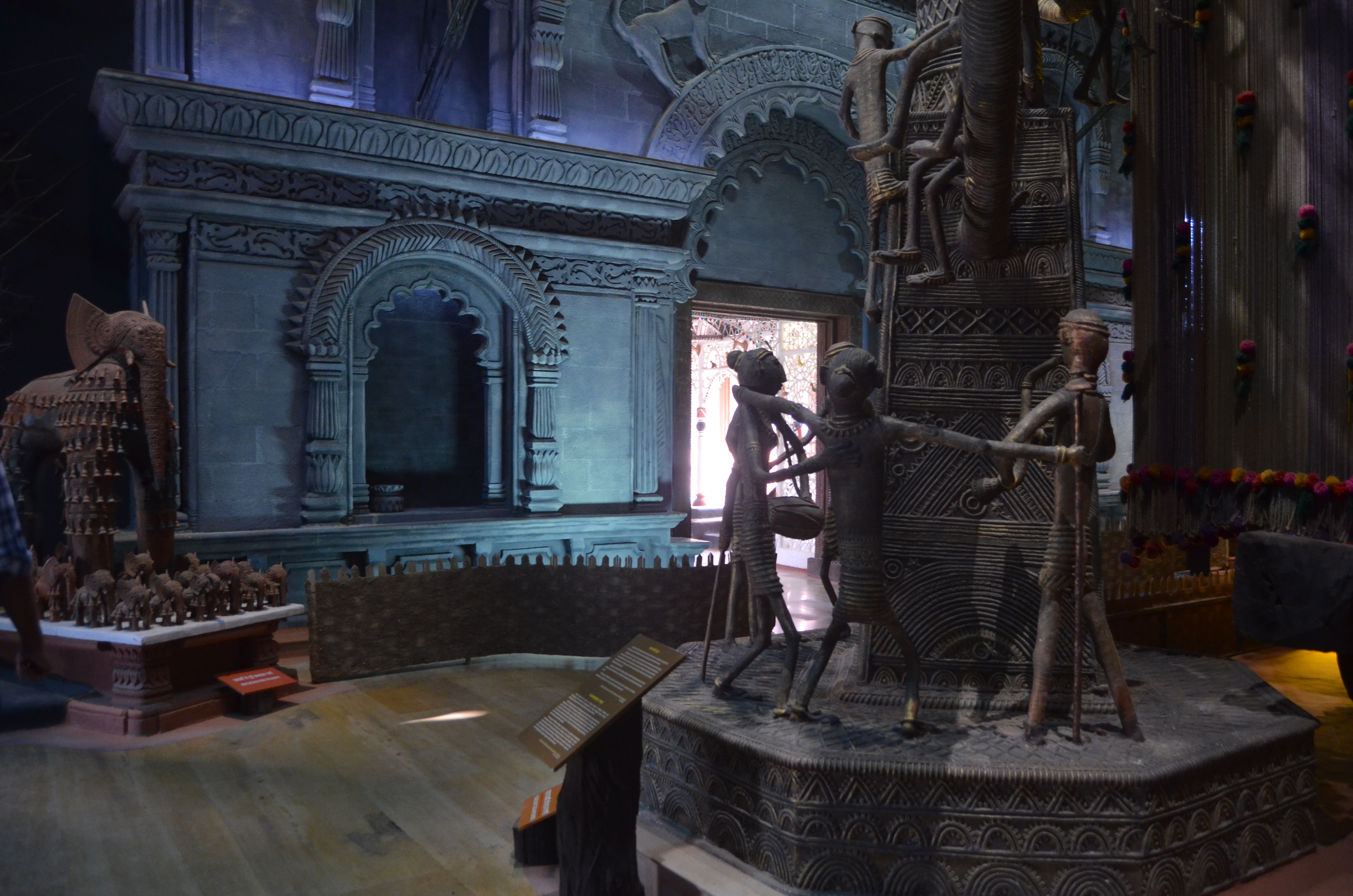

== Major galleries ==
The six galleries display various aspects of the tribal life.

1. Jeevan Shaili: A gallery of traditional houses of the Gond, Korku, Bhil, and Sahariya tribes made up of mud, bamboo, dung, hay, and grass which also portrays the essentials such as agricultural tools, earthenware used by them. These housing structures allow one to understand how historically such tribal communities have built their life around natural resources.
2. Sanskritik Vaividhya: Culturally diverse exhibits that showcase different traditions such as weddings and festivals of the tribal communities.
3. Kalabodh: The expression of tribal lifestyle in the form of artwork
4. Devlok: This section comprises the traditional tribal houses dedicated to deities exhibiting different myths and beliefs associated with the customs of worshipping mother earth, mountains, rivers, etc.
5. Chhattisgarh Dirgha depicts the tribal art of Chhattisgarh.
6. Rakku Dirgha: This gallery allows one to learn about the traditional games played by the young children of tribal communities.

== Other features ==
There is an amphitheatre inside the museum which hosts scheduled plays, musical performances, and folk dances. There is also a retail outlet for handicrafts and artefacts, called Chinhari. The museum also publishes an in-house magazine, Choumasa, about the tribal lifestyle.
