= Pravina Mehta =

Indian architect, planner, and political activist

- Born: 1923 or 1925
- Died: 1992 or 1988
- Occupation: Architect
- Known for: Navi Mumbai urban planning Layout

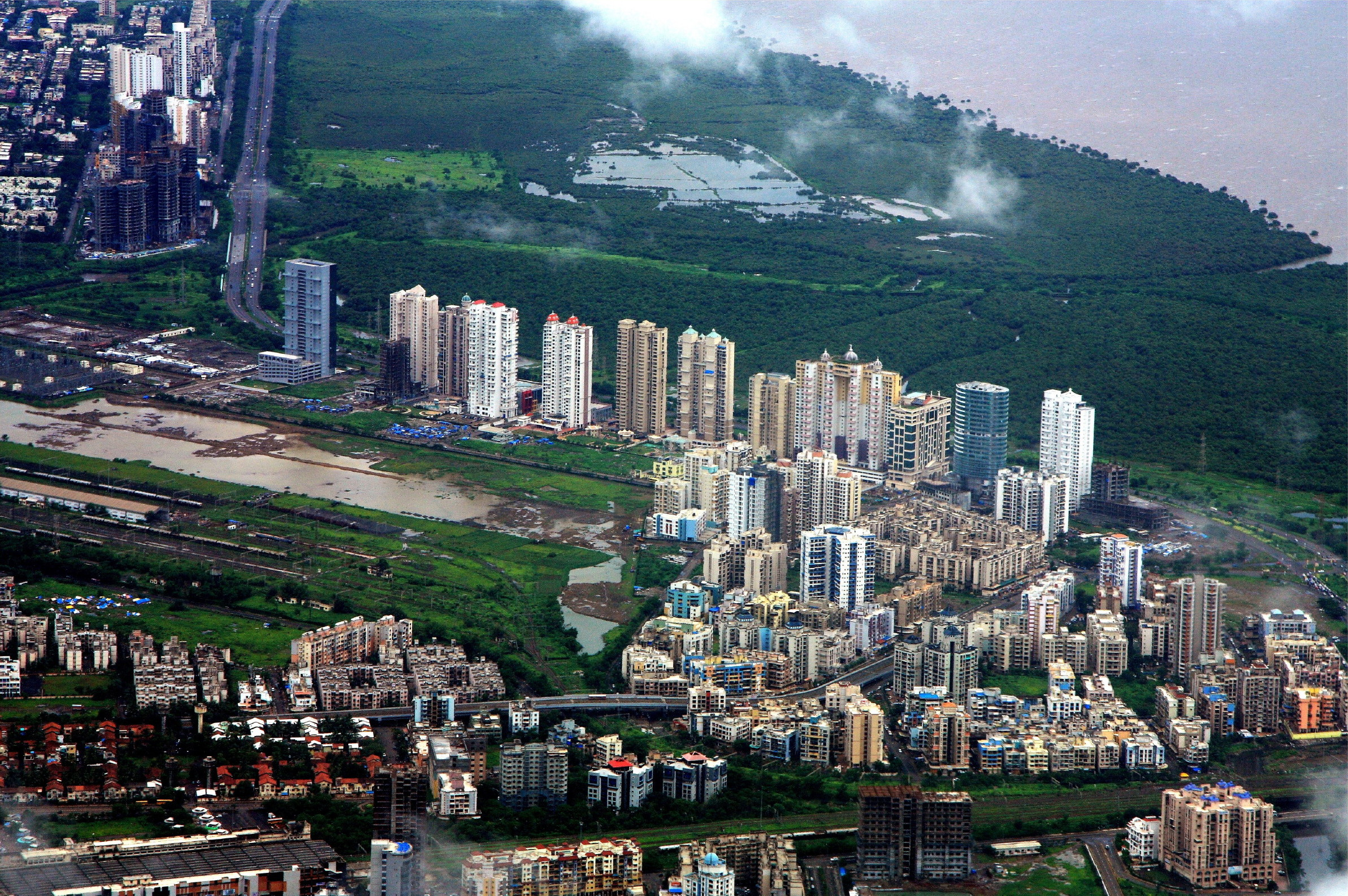
Pravina Mehta's notable work of Navi Mumbai Urban planning with two other architects

Pravina Mehta (1923–1992 or 1925–1988) of Mumbai was a leading Indian architect, planner and also a political activist. During the Indian independence movement, she was inspired by Sarojini Naidu, a freedom fighter and participated in the street protests against the British Raj before she started her study of architecture at the Sir J. J. College of Architecture. She was involved in the conceptualization and proposal of the New Bombay plan in 1964 in collaboration with Charles Correa and Shirish Patel, which involved extension of the island city located to the east on the mainland. This plan was published in MARG, a Bombay journal of art and architecture. She, along with Minnette De Silva and Yasmeen Lari, was also actively involved in upliftment of people living in slums and in the rehabilitation of earthquake-affected people by developing low-cost housing, combined with environmental aspects and urban planning.

== Early life and education ==
Mehta had her initial education at the Sir J. J. College of Architecture in the 1940s. She discontinued her education as she took active interest in the Indian independence movement, and then moved to the United States to pursue her studies in architecture. During the independence movement, she even suffered imprisonment. Leaving for the US, she was educated in the Illinois Institute of Design where she got her bachelor's degree in architecture. She then obtained her master's degree in architecture from the University of Chicago. After her education, she practiced for two years in Washington, D.C. She returned to India in 1956 to pursue her professional career in architecture.

== Professional life ==
Mehta was involved in the design of houses, factories, schools, and institutions, but her structures no longer exist. In her plans, she adopted the modern practices of architectural designs she had imbibed during her studies in the US to an independent and "resurgent India". One such modern adaptation was her use of red sandstone to handcraft a stairway.

She headed a research unit in Bombay city where the population was multi-social and where the socio-economic issues were complex. The research unit's task was to study the multi-diversity of the city, to conserve its socio-cultural life styles while evolving city plans to meet housing, sanitation, water supply, and other needs. She also aimed at establishing a link between architecture and other art forms. It was her view that traditional Indian art forms, which are rhythmic in style, could be translated to "the language of concrete and mortar".

Her notable architectural designs include the Patel House, Kahim, a weekend resort facing the sea built in 1962 and said to have been influenced by Le Corbusier; and the Factory Chinchwada in Maharashtra called the J.B. Advani Oerlikon Electrodes Factory, which was built in 1963 with labour-intensive on-site fabrication, and whose ventilation and lighting were provided by a rhythmic arrangement of windows.

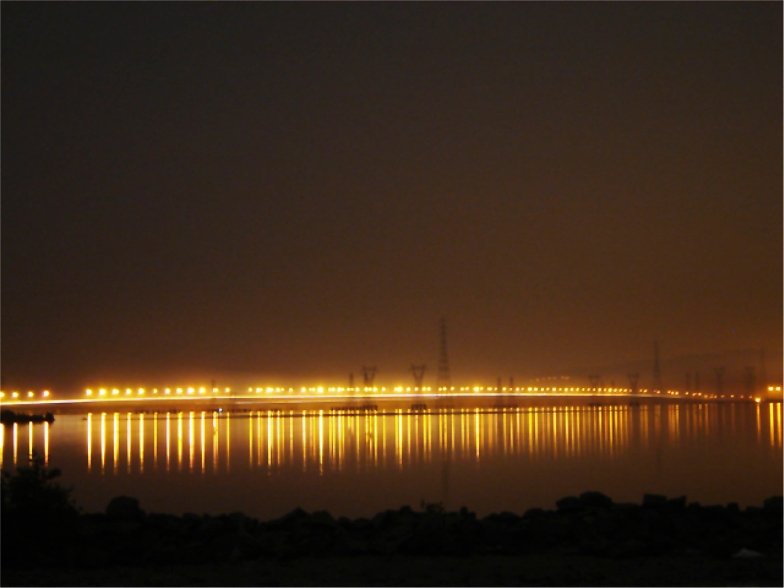
A bridge across Vashi Creek in Navi Mumbai

In 1964, Correa, together with Mehta and Patel, proposed a plan for New Bombay (now known as Navi Mumbai), which was different from the earlier plans prepared to extend the city limits upstream of the peninsula. Their vision has been compared to that in the popular Bollywood film Shre 420, a film set in Bombay, the theme of which was hope. In this effort under the influence of MARG, CIDCO gave them "key decision-making positions" which enabled them to prepare the Draft Development Plan of October 1973. This plan was approved for implementation in August 1979. The plan proposed government initiatives which included building new roads, bridges and industrial zoning.

Mehta and her husband were also involved in dance, and she tried to blend the rhythm of the dance form in the planning of her buildings. A fine example of her blending the two forms is reflected in the audiovisual recording centre at Arehi, where in a limited space of 600 square feet (56 m^{2}), she maintained an aesthetic presentation of folklore and traditional colours.

Working in a male-dominated society, her approach to work was dictated by her saying, "When a woman is truly committed to her career, when there is an inner compulsion, she ceases to regard herself as a woman but only acts as a professional".

== See also ==
- Revathi S. Kamath (1955–2020) was an Indian architect and planner based in Delhi.
- Sheela Patel (born 1952) is an activist and academic involved with people living in slums and shanty towns.

== Bibliography ==
- Bhatt, Vikram; Scriver, Peter (1990). After the masters. Mapin Pub. ISBN 9780944142196.
- Brown, Rebecca (1 January 2009). Art for a Modern India, 1947–1980. Duke University Press. ISBN 978-0-8223-9226-2.
- Prakash, Gyan (9 January 2013). Mumbai Fables. HarperCollins Publishers. ISBN 978-93-5029-479-6.
- Shaw, Annapurna (1 January 2004). The Making of Navi Mumbai. Orient Blackswan. ISBN 978-81-250-2600-6.
- Smith, Bonnie G. (2008). The Oxford Encyclopedia of Women in World History: 4 Volume Set. Oxford University Press, USA. ISBN 978-0-19-514890-9.
