= The Architecture of a Deccan Sultanate =

Book by Pushkar Sohoni

The Architecture of a Deccan Sultanate: Courtly Practice and Royal Authority in Late Medieval India
- First edition
- Author: Pushkar Sohoni
- Language: English
- Series: Library of Islamic South Asia
- Subject: Art history, architecture, Deccan sultanates
- Published: 2018
- Publisher: I.B.Tauris
- Publication place: United Kingdom
- Media type: Print (hardback)
- Pages: xxvii, 289 pages
- ISBN: 9781784537944
- OCLC: 991786105
- LC Class: NA6007.M34 S65 2018

The Architecture of a Deccan Sultanate: Courtly Practice and Royal Authority in Late Medieval India is a book by the architectural and art historian Pushkar Sohoni, published in 2018 by I.B. Tauris. It is one of the most comprehensive works on the architecture and urban settlements of the Nizam Shahs of Ahmadnagar, who ruled in the sixteenth century.

== Synopsis ==
The Architecture of a Deccan Sultanate is based on primary research using architecture, painting, and numismatics, to reconstruct the social context in which the material remains of the sultanate of Ahmadnagar could be located. The sixteenth century kingdom has been poorly studied in the past, and its monuments are endangered. The primary focus of the book is the architecture of the Nizam Shahi sultanate (1490–1636), also known as the kingdom of Ahmadnagar, the least well known of the three major polities in the Deccan prior to the Mughal conquest. As noted by Laura Parodi, "the book fills a notable gap in the cultural and architectural history of South Asia and the Islamic world."

== Reception ==
The book was well-received, and was reviewed in several places, including the magazine Frontline where it was cited as being valuable for "the much-needed nuance it provides to the story of medieval India." George Michell, the architectural historian, called it "a significant contribution to architectural history, adding to a more complete understanding of medieval Indo-Islamic culture." It was quoted by Manu S. Pillai as one of the books on his reading list for that year. Reviewed by The Muslim World Book Review, it was suggested that any reader of this "splendid monograph must feel humbled by the enormity of his labour, his scholarly acumen and his gentle humanism." It was reviewed in the International Journal of Islamic Architecture where the Islamic art historian Laura Parodi described it as "highly recommended to architectural historians, garden and landscape historians, architects specializing in conservation, practitioners working in the management of historical heritage in developing countries, and all scholars working on Islam in South Asia." The book has been used as a source for various essays and websites.

The book has subsequently been published both as an ebook and a paperback by Bloomsbury Publishing. The book was featured as the subject of a lecture in a series called From Malabar to Coromandel: The Future of Deccan Heritage, Art, and Culture organised by the Deccan Heritage Foundation, the Centre for Islamic Studies at the University of Cambridge and the HH Sri Srikantadutta Narasimharaja Wadeyar Foundation in November 2020.

== See also ==
- Deccan Sultanates
- Architecture of the Deccan sultanates
- Ahmednagar
- Pushkar Sohoni
