= Revathi Kamath =

Indian architect (1955–2020)

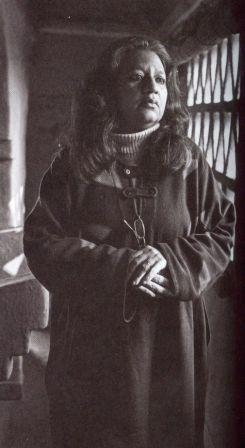
- Born: 1955 (age 70–71); Bhubaneswar, Odisha, India
- Occupation: Architect
- Practice: Kamath Design Studio

Revathi S. Kamath (1955-2020) was an Indian architect and planner based in Delhi. She is a pioneer of mud architecture in India. In addition to this, she is also credited with building the tallest stainless steel structure in India.

== Early life ==
Revathi Kamath was born in Bhubaneswar, Odisha in a Tamil Brahmin family. She spent her formative years in Bangalore and tribal areas along the Mahanadi river, where her father, an engineer was working on the Hirakud dam. These early years left a deep impression on her understanding of nature, people and the rhythms of life.

== Education and early career ==
She obtained her Bachelor's degree in Architecture (1977) and completed a post-graduate programme in Urban and Regional Planning (1981) both from the School of Planning and Architecture, Delhi. After graduation, she worked with Stein, Doshi and Bhalla for a year and later with Rassik International, Architects and furniture designers in New Delhi. In 1979, she started work with The GRUP (Group for Rural & Urban Planning), a partnership firm between Vasant Kamath, Romi Khosla and Narendra Dengle. She has also worked for the National Institute of Urban Affairs in 1981. She was visiting Faculty (1984–87) and Assistant Professor (1987–91) at the School of Planning and Architecture, New Delhi.

== Architectural practice ==
In 1981, she opened a firm with Vasant Kamath, "Revathi and Vasant Kamath", which later came to be known as "Kamath Design Studio - Architecture, Planning and Environment" (2005). The studio has handled a wide variety of projects, in diverse social, economic and geographical contexts. The Anandgram Project for Rehabilitation of slum dwellers near Shadipur Depot, Delhi was one of the earliest in early 1983. Revathi Kamath is noted for her sensitive efforts for conceiving the "Evolving Home" concept for redevelopment. She consulted with 350 families to understand individual needs and to give them a first home on the ground.

Three of her projects have been nominated for the Aga Khan Award. They are the Akshay Pratishthan School in Delhi, Community Center at Maheshwar and Nalin Tomar House at Hauz Khas, Delhi.

Revathi has contributed to the exhibition – "Traditional Architecture in India" for the festival of India in Paris, in 1986. She was also on the contributing design team for the Eternal Gandhi Multimedia Museum. She was co-curator and designer for the exhibition "Craft: A Tool for Social Change" for VHAI (Voluntary Health Association of India) in 2003. She worked for the Museum for Tribal Heritage, Bhopal, the Gnostic Center, Delhi, a research center for growth of consciousness, Jiva Wellness Center and Jiva University for Yogic Sciences also.

== Selected projects ==
- Desert Resort in Mandawa, Rajasthan
- Mud house for Nandita and Amit Judge, Delhi
- House for Nalin, Hauz Khas Village, Delhi
- Jivashram animal shelter, Delhi
- Akshay Pratishthan, Delhi
- Community Centre, Maheshwar, Madhya Pradesh
- Weavers’ housing project, Maheshwar, Madhya Pradesh
- School for weavers’ children at Maheshwar, Madhya Pradesh
- Kamath house, Anangpur (in collaboration with Vasant Kamath)
- Gateway for Jindal Power Plant at Tamnar, Chhattisgarh(in collaboration with Ayodh Kamath)
- VIP Guest House for Jindal Power Limited at Raigarh, Chhattisgarh (in collaboration with Vasant Kamath)
- Auditorium at Raigarh, Chhattisgarh
- Tal Chhapar Sanctuary for Government of Rajasthan, Churu, Rajasthan
- Museum for Tribal Heritage, Bhopal, Madhya Pradesh
- Gnostic Centre, Delhi (ongoing project)

== Awards and honors ==
- Revathi Kamath received the World Women in Arts, Architecture, and Design (WADe Asia)—Sustainability Award in 2018.
- Revathi Kamath has also been the recipient of the prestigious Aga Khan Award.

== See also ==
- Pravina Mehta (1923–1992 or 1925–1988) of Mumbai was a leading Indian architect, planner and also a political activist.
- Sheela Patel (born 1952) is an activist and academic involved with people living in slums and shanty towns.
