= Pushkar Sohoni =

Indian architect

- Born: 1976 (age 49–50); Pune

Academic background
- Education: Ph.D. (2010); M.S. (2002); B.Arch. (1999)
- Alma mater: University of Pennsylvania, Philadelphia; University of Pune, Pune
- Doctoral advisor: Michael W. Meister
- Other advisors: Renata Holod, Daud Ali

Academic work
- Discipline: History of art History of architecture Archeology
- Institutions: Indian Institute of Science Education and Research, Pune, University of Pennsylvania, Philadelphia; University of British Columbia, Vancouver; University of the Arts, Philadelphia; Philadelphia Museum of Art, Philadelphia

Pushkar Sohoni is an architect, and an architectural and cultural historian. He is a Professor in the Department of Humanities and Social Sciences at the Indian Institute of Science Education and Research, Pune. He was chair of the department from 2019 to 2024.

== Education ==
Pushkar Sohoni attended Loyola High School (Pune). After graduating with a Bachelor of Architecture (B.Arch.) degree from the University of Pune in 1999, he attended the University of Pennsylvania School of Design (then known as the Graduate School of Fine Arts) to get a Master of Science (M.S.) in Historic Preservation. In 2002, he wrote a Master's Thesis under the guidance of Prof. Frank Matero on preservation policy for the city walls of Cairo. From 2002, he was in the Department of History of Art of the University of Pennsylvania School of Arts and Sciences while being a Graduate Advisor in Fisher-Hassenfeld College House. In 2010, he received his doctoral degree (Ph.D.) from the University of Pennsylvania for his dissertation on the architecture of the Nizam Shahi dynasty. He worked under the supervision of Prof. Michael W. Meister and Prof. Renata Holod. Pushkar Sohoni was the post-doctoral fellow for Indo-Persian Studies in the Department of Asian Studies at the University of British Columbia in 2010–2011, where he was a resident of Green College.

== Experience ==
In October 2016, Pushkar Sohoni joined the Indian Institute of Science Education and Research, Pune as an assistant professor, and became an associate professor in 2019, and a professor in 2025. Before that, he worked as the South Asia Bibliographer and Librarian at the University of Pennsylvania Libraries, and a lecturer in the Department of South Asian Studies from 2011 to 2016. In this period, Pushkar Sohoni was in charge of the South Asia Collection at the University of Pennsylvania Libraries, and wrote a "widely circulated blog post" on collecting practices for libraries. He was on the advisory board of the Title VI South Asia Center. Pushkar Sohoni also served as a member of the Committee on South Asian Libraries and Documentation (CONSALD), and was on the executive board of the South Asia Materials Project (SAMP) from 2013 to 2015. In 2017–18, he was a visiting associate professor at Anant National University. His work on the palaces of the Nizam Shahs has been cited in several popular and scholarly articles and essays. He has also written about language, scripts, numismatics, and material culture.
Pushkar Sohoni often speaks at public events, and has led heritage walks. He often speaks on the local history of Pune. Dr. Sohoni has lectured extensively on the architecture of the Deccan. He has lectured on several occasions at Jnanapravaha in Mumbai. He has also appeared in several documentary films, such as Revelations Monumentales: Taj Mahal, and Tales of Ahmednagar. In January 2020, he was on a panel at the Kerala Literature Festival to discuss Tony Joseph's book Early Indians. Dr. Sohoni has also been a moderator at several conferences, including the History Literature Festival. He has taught at the University of Pennsylvania, the University of the Arts (Philadelphia), the University of British Columbia, and Comenius University in Bratislava, in addition to the Indian Institute of Science Education and Research, Pune. He has been a visiting critic at KRVIA.

Pushkar Sohoni worked on conservation projects in Mesa Verde National Park and in the Saint Louis Cemetery in New Orleans, as part of the Centre for Architectural Conservation (then known as the Architectural Conservation Laboratory) at the University of Pennsylvania. He was a member of the archaeological expedition to Iran in 2004, to excavate sites of the Jiroft culture. In 2005, he worked for the Architectural Heritage division of INTACH, New Delhi, working on the documentation of Durbar Hall in Qila Mubarak, Patiala.
Since 2015, he is an Associate Editor of South Asian Studies (Journal of the British Association for South Asian Studies (BASAS)). He is also the Reviews Editor (pre-1800 books, exhibitions, multimedia) for Architectural Histories, journal of European Architectural History Network (EAHN). He is on the advisory board of the Law, Humanities and Social Sciences Journal. Pushkar Sohoni is on the Board of Studies for Architecture (Department of Science and Technology), Savitribai Phule Pune University since 2018, for Architecture at Vishwakarma University since 2019, and at the Hafeez Contractor School of Architecture (MIT-WPU) since 2026. Dr Sohoni is also a member of the Academic Council of the Kamala Raheja Vidyanidhi Institute of Architecture and Planning (KRVIA) since 2026.

In 2025, along with Sarah Melsens and Maya Dodd, Pushkar Sohoni launched the Pune Architectural History Archive. The archive has been receiving good reviews from various news sources.

== Awards ==
The American Institute of Indian Studies (AIIS) awarded Pushkar Sohoni a Junior Research Fellowship in 2007–08. He was a member of the project Art Space and Mobility in the Early Ages of Globalization, organized by the Kunsthistorisches Institut in Florenz. While in residence at Green College, University of British Columbia, Pushkar Sohoni served on the executive board of the Dining Committee, Residents' Council, and the Membership Committee. He was a Guest Fellow at the Wolf Humanities Center at the University of Pennsylvania is 2012–13. Along with Lisa Mitchell and Raili Roy, he won a Penn Global Engagement Fund Award for the academic year 2013–14, for undergraduate research and cultural immersion experiences in India for students. In 2013, he was a sub-reviewer for projects that had received the Aga Khan Architectural Award. He is interested in numismatics, and has lent coins to exhibitions, including the show Sultans of Deccan India, 1500–1700: Opulence and Fantasy at the Metropolitan Museum in New York. In 2016–17, he and C. Ryan Perkins won an award from the American Institute of Pakistan Studies (AIPS) to conduct workshops for the cataloging and preservation of the Anjuman-i Taraqqi-i Urdu library in Karachi. Pushkar Sohoni was a non-residential visiting scholar of the Center for the Advanced Study of India at the University of Pennsylvania in the year 2016–17. He has received research grants from the Department of Science and Technology, Government of India, the Indian Council of Historical Research, and the Indian Council of Social Science Research. Pushkar Sohoni received a British Library Endangered Archives Programme grant for digitising Public Works Department (PWD) records.

== Publications ==
In 2015, he authored the book, Aurangabad, with Daulatabad, Khuldabad, and Ahmadnagar, focused on the sultanate architecture in the region. The book was quoted in a Bombay High Court order in 2018. In 2017, he co-authored with Kenneth X. Robbins, a book on the Jewish heritage in the western Deccan, titled Jewish Heritage of the Deccan: Mumbai, the Northern Konkan and Pune. In 2018, his book on the Nizam Shahs of Ahmadnagar and their architectural legacy in 2018, called The Architecture of a Deccan Sultanate: Courtly Practice and Royal Authority in Late Medieval India, was published. In 2021, he co-edited a book (with Torsten Tschacher) on the practices of Muharram across the world among South Asian communities: Non-Shia Practices of Muḥarram in South Asia and the Diaspora: Beyond Mourning. Along with Riyaz Latif, he wrote Sultanate Ahmadabad and its Monuments, published by Primus in 2022. His research on the colonial market halls of India was published in 2023 as Taming the Oriental Bazaar: Architecture of the Market-halls of Colonial India. In the same year, along with Pika Ghosh, he co-edited the festschrift to Michael W. Meister, titled Chakshudana or Opening the Eyes: Seeing South Asian Art Anew.

In 2024, the Maharashtra State Board for Literature and Culture published a two-volume set, in Marathi and in English, called महाराष्ट्रातील वास्तुकला : परंपरा आणि वाटचाल (Maharashtratil Vastukala: parampara ani vatachala) and Architecture in Maharashtra: tradition and journey respectively. It was edited by Narendra Dengle, with Pushkar Sohoni, Chetan Sahasrabuddhe, and Minal Sagare as co-editors.

He has written extensively on the history of architecture, the Deccan sultanates, numismatics, socio-linguistics, and aspects of material culture.

In 2017–2018, he wrote a fortnightly column called 'By the Wayside' for the Pune Mirror. He has been a consultant for the Sahapedia project on culturally mapping the city of Pune, and has contributed to My City My Heritage by InterGlobe Foundation.

== Research bibliography ==
=== Books (authored) ===
- Taming the Oriental Bazaar: Architecture of the Market-Halls of Colonial India (New York; Abingdon, Oxon: Routledge, 2023).
- (with Riyaz Latif) Sultanate Ahmadabad and its Monuments: The City of the Muzaffarids (Ahmad Shahis) (New Delhi: Primus Books, 2022).
- The Architecture of a Deccan Sultanate: Courtly Practice and Royal Authority in Late Medieval India (London: I.B. Tauris, 2018).
- (with Kenneth X. Robbins) Jewish Heritage of the Deccan: Mumbai, the Northern Konkan, Pune (Mumbai: Jaico; Deccan Heritage Foundation, 2017).
- Aurangabad with Daulatabad, Khuldabad, Ahmadnagar (Mumbai: Jaico; Deccan Heritage Foundation, 2015).

=== Books (edited) ===
- (with Narendra Dengle, Minal Sagare, Chetan Sahasrabuddhe), महाराष्ट्रातील वास्तुकला : परंपरा आणि वाटचाल, 2 volumes (मुंबई: महाराष्ट्र राज्य साहित्य आणि संस्कृती मंडळ, २०२४).
- (with Narendra Dengle, Minal Sagare, Chetan Sahasrabuddhe), Architecture in Maharashtra: Tradition and Journey, 2 volumes (Mumbai: Maharashtra State Board for Literature and Culture, 2024).
- (with Pika Ghosh) Chakshudana or Opening the Eyes: Seeing South Asian Art Anew (New York; Abingdon, Oxon: Routledge, 2023).
- (with Torsten Tschacher) Non-Shia Practices of Muḥarram in South Asia and the Diaspora Beyond Mourning (New York; Oxon: Routledge, 2021).

=== Edited Journal Issue ===
- (with Carmen Brandt) Languages and Scripts of South Asia: Special Issue of South Asian History and Culture, (2018), vol. 9, no. 1. ISSN 1947-2501.

=== Research Essays and Articles ===
- ‘The neglected upper layer: historical archaeology and the Muslim and Maratha pasts of the Deccan’ in World Archaeology, (2026), pp. 1-16.
- ‘Kannauj: A Capital in Soft Focus’ in INTACH Journal of Heritage Studies, vol. 7 no. 1 (2026), Kannauj: Traditions, Innovations and Legacies, pp. 1-12.
- (with Aparna Andhare) ‘Kalavati of Kannauj: A Century of Candy’ in INTACH Journal of Heritage Studies, vol. 7 no. 1 (2026), Kannauj: Traditions, Innovations and Legacies, pp. 43-56.
- ‘Beyond Iconoclasm: Temple Construction under the Sultanates’ in Sam Dalrymple (ed.), Marg, vol. 77 no. 3 (2026), The Temple, Mughalised: 16th–19th Centuries, North India, pp. 34–47.
- (with Tejashree Lakras) ‘A Critical Analysis of an Architectural Heritage Site as a Filming Location Through Heritage Impact Assessments: The Case of Amber Palace, Rajasthan, India’ in Journal of Heritage Management, vol. 10 no. 2 (Dec 2025), pp. 207–224.
- 'Maritime Fortifications: Defending Land and Sea' in Amarendra Kumar (ed.), Tides of Triumph: the Maratha Navy Saga (Mumbai: Harper Vantage, 2025), pp. 97–116.
- 'Paṭṭā: The Maratha Sword' in Journal of Arms and Armour, vol. 22 no. 1 (Spring 2025), pp. 131–144.
- 'Janjira Fort and Rajapuri Port: Connected Histories in a Coastal Complex' in Shefali Balsari-Shah and Sunita Nair (eds.), Gateways to the Sea: Historic Ports and Docks of Mumbai Region (New Delhi: Publications Division, Ministry of Information and Broadcasting, 2024), pp. 174–182.
- 'Creating an Ecumene: Cultural, Economic, Social Boundaries of the Deccan Sultanates' in South Asian Studies vol. 39 no. 2, (2023), pp. 146–159.
- (with Pika Ghosh) 'Introduction: Reading Monuments and Seeing Texts: Michael W. Meister and the Opening of Eyes' in Pika Ghosh and Pushkar Sohoni (eds.), Chakshudana (Opening the Eyes): Seeing South Asian Art Anew (New York; Abingdon, Oxon: Routledge, 2023), pp. 1–17.
- 'Squaring a Circle: Design and Construction in the Temple of Anwa' in Pika Ghosh and Pushkar Sohoni (eds.), Chakshudana (Opening the Eyes): Seeing South Asian Art Anew (New York; Abingdon, Oxon: Routledge, 2023), pp. 74–90.
- 'Reflections of Rauza: Connected Histories of Burhanpur and Khuldabad' in South Asian History, Culture and Archaeology, vol. 3 no. 1 (June 2023), pp. 123–126.
- 'Mansions of the Gods and Visions of Paradise' in Nidan: International Journal for Indian Studies, vol. 8 issue 1 (July 2023), pp. 88–99.
- 'Sacred Cows and Winged Steeds: Convergence of Material Form' in Kalyana Mitra: A Treasure House of History, Culture, and Archaeological Studies (Festschrift to Prof. P. Chenna Reddy), vol. 6 (New Delhi: Bluerose Publishers, 2023), pp. 370–375.
- 'Caprids on Early Iranian Ceramics: Static Forms, Dynamic Meanings' in Abhayan G.S., Pankaj Goyal, and Sharada C.V. (eds.), Animals in Archaeology: Integrating Landscapes, Environment and Humans in South Asia (A Festschrift for Prof. P.P. Joglekar), vol. 2 (Thiruvananathapuram: Department of Archaeology, University of Kerala, 2023), pp. 441–451.
- 'A Story Without Architecture: The Mythical Origins of Mumbai' in South Asian Studies, vol. 39 no. 1 (2023), pp 1–9.
- 'Cultural Translation and Linguistic Equivalence: Persian–Marathi Bilingual Inscriptions' in Journal of Persianate Studies, vol. 15 (2022), pp. 70–84.
- 'Introduction' in Heiko Sievers (ed.), Thomas Lüttge and Hans Winterberg: Golconda - Hyderabad 1974 - 1996 – 2012, A Photographic Essay (New Delhi: Rupa, 2022), pp. 17–19.
- 'Golconda and Hyderabad' in Heiko Sievers (ed.), Thomas Lüttge and Hans Winterberg: Golconda - Hyderabad 1974 - 1996 – 2012, A Photographic Essay (New Delhi: Rupa, 2022), pp. 179–184.
- 'From Colonial to National: Appropriating the Past in Service of the Present' in Mrinalini Venkateswaran (ed.), March to Freedom: Reflections on India's Independence (New Delhi: DAG, 2022), pp. 161–167.
- (with Pallavee Gokhale) 'Strike Two: Afterlife of Bahmani Coinage' in American Journal of Numismatics, vol. 33 (2021), pp. 189–209.
- (with Torsten Tschacher) 'Introduction' in Pushkar Sohoni and Torsten Tschacher (eds.), Non-Shia Practices of Muḥarram in South Asia and the Diaspora: Beyond Mourning (London: Routledge, 2021), pp. 1–11.
- 'Visual language of piety and power: Ta'ziahs and temples in the Western Deccan' in Pushkar Sohoni and Torsten Tschacher (eds.), Non-Shia Practices of Muḥarram in South Asia and the Diaspora: Beyond Mourning (London: Routledge, 2021), pp. 41–52.
- (with John Mathew), 'Teaching and Research in Colonial Bombay' in Ku-ming Chang and Alan J. Rocke (eds.), A Global History of Research Education: Disciplines, Institutions, and Nations, 1840-1950 History of Universities Series, vol. XXXIV no. 1 (Oxford: Oxford University Press, 2021), pp. 269–291.
- 'Architectural Traditions in the Deccan' in Richard M. Eaton and Ramya Sreenivasan (eds), The Oxford Handbook of the Mughal World (online edn, Oxford Academic, 6 Aug. 2020).
- 'Postal Project: Rocket mail and the creation of the aero-philatelic market in India' in Culture, Continuity and Tradition: Disquisitions in Honour of Prof. Vasant Shinde (New Delhi: B.R. Publications, 2020), pp. 815–823, plates 934–938.
- 'The Fort of Janjira' in African Rulers and Generals in India (Afro-South Asia in the Global African Diaspora, vol. 1) (Greensboro, NC; Ahmedabad: University of North Carolina Ethiopian and East African Studies Project; Ahmedabad Sidi Heritage and Educational Center, 2020), pp. 167–183.
- 'Memorials of Sovereignty: Funerary Architecture of the Siddis of Janjira at Khokri (Maharashtra)' in Arts Asiatiques, vol. 74 (2019), pp. 147–154.
- (with William Kwiatkowski), 'Notice: An Unpublished Inscription from the Fort of Ahmadnagar' in Journal of the Royal Asiatic Society, vol. 29 no. 4 (Oct 2019), pp. 723–726.
- 'Architectural Continuity across Political Ruptures: Early Marathas and the Deccan Sultanates' in Laurie McMillin and Bina Sengar (eds.), Spaces and Places in Western India: Formations and Delineations (New Delhi: Routledge India, 2019), pp. 107–114.
- 'The Hunt for a Location: Narratives on the Foundation of Cities in South and Southeast Asia' in Asian Ethnology, vol. 77, nos. 1&2 (2018), pp. 215–233.
- 'The Non-issue of Coinage: The Monetary Policies of the Post-Bahmani Sultanates' in Journal of the Royal Asiatic Society, vol. 28, issue 3 (October 2018), pp. 645–659.
- 'Building History: Historiography of Architectural History in South Asia' in History Compass, vol. 16, no. 5 (May 2018).
- 'Imbrication and Implication: Early Maratha Architecture and the Deccan Sultanates' in Archives of Asian Art, vol. 68, no. 1 (Apr 2018), pp. 33–46.
- 'Translocated Animal Subjects in Collaboration: Animals and Human Knowledge' in Transfers: Interdisciplinary Journal of Mobility Studies, vol. 8 no. 1 (2018), pp. 1–14.
- (with Carmen Brandt), 'Script and Identity - The Politics of Writing in South Asia: An Introduction' to Languages and Scripts of South Asia: Special Issue of South Asian History and Culture, vol. 9, no. 1 (2018), pp. 1–15.
- 'Colonial and Post-colonial Debates about Polygraphia in Marathi' in Languages and Scripts of South Asia: Special Issue of South Asian History and Culture, vol. 9, no. 1 (2018), pp. 38–46.
- 'Old Fights, New Meanings: Lions and Elephants in Combat' in Res: Anthropology and Aesthetics, vol. 67/68 (2016/2017), pp. 225–234.
- 'Marathi of a Single Type: the Demise of the Modi Script' in Modern Asian Studies, vol. 51, issue 3 (May 2017), pp. 662–685.
- 'Flushing out the Enemy: Revisiting the Battle of Bhatavadi' in Bulletin of the Deccan College Post-Graduate and Research Institute, vol. 76 (2016), pp. 15–22.
- 'A Tale of Two Imperial Residences: Aurangzeb's Architectural Patronage' in Journal of Islamic Architecture, vol. 4, issue 2 (Dec 2016), pp. 63–69.
- 'Vernacular as a Space: Writing in the Deccan' in South Asian History and Culture, vol. 7, no. 3 (Apr 2016), pp. 258–270.
- 'Paper Documents and Copper Plates: Localization of Hegemonic Practices' in Bulletin of the School of Oriental and African Studies, vol. 79, issue 1 (Feb 2016), pp. 87–101.
- 'Continuities in the Sacred Landscape: Ellora, Khuldabad and the Temple of Ghrishneshwara' in Syed Ayub Ali (ed.), Studies in Medieval Deccan History: Dr. M.A. Nayeem felicitation volume (Warangal; New Delhi: Deccan History Society; Indian Council of Historical Research, 2015), pp. 56–68.
- 'From Defended Settlements to Fortified Strongholds: Responses to Gunpowder in the early modern Deccan' in South Asian Studies (British Association of South Asian Studies), vol. 31, no. 1 (Jan 2015), pp. 111–126.
- 'Gaining Pious Merit and Creating Images of Paradise: Gardens and Irrigation' in K. Krishna Naik and E. Siva Nagi Reddy (eds.), Cultural Contours of History and Archaeology: in honour of Snehasiri Prof. P. Chenna Reddy, vol. 2 (New Delhi: B.R. Publishing Corporation, 2014), pp. 111–119.
- 'Patterns of Faith: Mosque Typologies and sectarian affiliation in the kingdom of Ahmadnagar' in David Roxburgh (ed.), Seeing the Past—Envisioning Islamic Art and Architecture: Essays in Honor of Renata Holod (Leiden: Brill, 2014), pp. 110–127.
- 'Medieval Chaul under the Nizam Shahs: an Historic and Archaeological Investigation' in Laura E. Parodi (ed.), The Visual World of Muslim India: The Art, Culture and Society of the Deccan in the Early Modern Era (London: I.B. Tauris, 2014), pp. 53–75.
- (with Klaus Rötzer) 'Nature, Dams, Wells and Gardens: The Route of Water in and around Bidar' in Daud Ali and Emma Flatt (ed.), Garden and Landscape Practices in Pre-Colonial India (New Delhi: Routledge, 2011), pp. 54–73.
- 'Architecture of the Nizam Shahs' in Helen Philon (ed.), Silent Splendour: Palaces of the Deccan, 14th-19th Centuries (Mumbai: Marg Publications, 2010), pp. 56–65.
- (with Amol Kulkarni) 'Index to the Annual Reports of the Archaeological Department of His Exalted Highness The Nizam's Dominions' in Journal of Deccan Studies, vol. 6, no. 1 (Jan-Jun 2009), pp. 41–78.
- 'Change and memory in Farah Bagh' in Journal of Deccan Studies, vol. 4 no. 2 (Jul-Dec 2007), pp. 59–77.

=== Scholarly Reference Entries and Textbook Chapters ===
- 'Pūna (Pune)' in The Encyclopaedia of Islam Three (Leiden; London: Brill, 2023).
- (with Swapna Joshi) 'Geological Wonder as a Sacred Landscape: The Lonar Crater' in Education About Asia, vol. 27 no. 3 (Winter 2022), pp. 37–41.
- Marathi Language Summary in N.B. Raja et al., 'Colonial history and global economics distort our understanding of deep-time biodiversity' in Nature Ecology & Evolution (2021), p. 16.
- 'Architecture in South Asia' in Oxford Bibliographies in Architecture, Planning and Preservation (New York: Oxford University Press, 2021).
- 'Colonial and Modern Architecture in India' in Oxford Bibliographies in Architecture, Planning and Preservation (New York: Oxford University Press, 2021).
- 'Nizam Shahis art and architecture (Deccan dynasty)' in The Encyclopaedia of Islam Three (Leiden; London: Brill, 2021), pp. 140–145.
- 'Regional Cities', Block 4 (2) Urbanisation in Medieval India-1, MHI-10, Urbanisation in India, IGNOU Study Material (2017), pp. 29–62.

=== Academic Book Reviews ===
- REVIEW: Sandria B. Freitag, Acts of Seeing, Ways of Knowing: Visual Culture in the Making of Modern India (New Delhi: Primus, 2025), in LA Landscape: Journal of Landscape Architecture issue 86 (2026), pp. 82-85.
- REVIEW: Farshid Emami, Isfahan: Architecture and Urban Experience in Early Modern Iran (University Park: Penn State University Press, 2024) in Renaissance and Reformation, vol. 49 no. 1 (Winter 2026), pp. 44-46.
- REVIEW: Marcia Stephenson, Llamas Beyond the Andes: Untold Histories of Camelids in the Modern World (Austin: University of Texas Press, 2023), in Isis, vol. 116 no. 2 (June 2025), pp. 403–404.
- REVIEW: Rosie Llewellyn-Jones, Empire Building: The Construction of British India, 1690-1860 (London: Hurst Publishers, 2023) in Pacific Affairs, vol. 97 no. 2 (June 2024), pp. 690–692. ISSN 0030-851X. ISBN 9781787388048.
- REVIEW: 'Locating the Present in the Past: Seeking Modern States in History' – Bhangya Bhukya, A Cultural History of Telangana: From the Earliest Times to 1724 AD (Hyderabad: Orient BlackSwan, 2021) in Economic and Political Weekly vol. LVIII no. 16 (22 April 2023), pp. 29–30.
- REVIEW: Keelan Overton (ed.), Iran and the Deccan: Persianate Art, Culture, and Talent in Circulation, 1400-1700 (Bloomington, Indiana: Indiana University Press, 2020) in Bulletin of the School of the Oriental and African Studies, vol. 83 issue 3 (Oct 2020), pp. 538–539.
- REVIEW: Shonaleeka Kaul, The Making of Early Kashmir: Landscape and Identity in the Rajatarangini (New Delhi: Oxford University Press, 2018) in LA Landscape: Journal of Landscape Architecture, issue 55 (2018), pp. 113–115.
- REVIEW: Richard M. Eaton and Phillip B. Wagoner, Power, Memory, Architecture: Contested Sites on India's Deccan Plateau, 1300-1600 (New Delhi: Oxford University Press, 2014) on H-Asia, H-Net Reviews (May 2017).
- REVIEW: Thomas R. Trautmann, Elephants and Kings: an environmental history (Chicago: The University of Chicago Press, 2015) in South Asian History and Culture, vol. 7, no. 4 (2016), pp. 434–436.
- REVIEW: Nile Green, Making Space: Sufis and Settlers in Early Modern India (Oxford: Oxford University Press, 2012) in International Journal of Islamic Architecture, vol. 5, no. 1 (Mar 2016), pp. 213–214.

=== Academic blogs, Online Essays, and Popular Writing ===
- 'स्थापत्यावरील इस्लामी व युरोपीय प्रभाव' (Sthāpatyāvarīla islāmī āṇi yuropīya prabhāva) in भवताल दिवाळी अंक २०२४ (Bhavatāla Divāḷī añka 2024), pp. 98–105.
- 'किल्ल्यांच्या रचनेतील देवाणघेवाण' (Killyāñcā racanetīla devāṇaghevāṇa) in भवताल दिवाळी अंक २०२४ (Bhavatāla Divāḷī añka 2024), pp. . 108–113.
- 'मराठ्यांचा पट्टा' (Marāṭhyāñcā paṭṭā) in भवताल दिवाळी अंक २०२४ (Bhavatāla Divāḷī añka 2024), pp. 114–115.
- 'महिरप' (Mahirap) in भवताल दिवाळी अंक २०२४ (Bhavatāla Divāḷī añka 2024), pp. 106–107.
- 'अहमदनगर ते अहिल्यानगर: नामांतर आणि ऐतिहासिक कोलांटीउड्या (अनुवाद: चैत्रा रेडकर)' (Ahamadanagara te Āhilyānagara: nāmāntara āṇi aitihāsika kolāṇṭīuḍyā) in ऐसी अक्षरे (Aisī Akśare).
- 'वास्तुविचार: पहाडापासून धुळीपर्यंत' (Vāstuvicāra: pahāḍāpāsuna dhuḷīparyanta) in ऐसी अक्षरे दिवाळी अंक २०२१ (Aisī Akśare Divāḷī añka 2021).
- 'Museums and Collections in Pune' on Sahapedia / In Pune.
- 'Educational and Research Institutes in Pune' on Sahapedia / In Pune.
- 'Burhanpur: Gateway to the Deccan' for Live History India.
- 'Ahmadnagar: The Sultans' Fading Legacy' for Live History India.
- 'Of Elephants, Men, and Diplomacy Gone Wrong' for the site Live History India.
- 'Nizam Shahs of Ahmadnagar: First among Equals' for the site Live History India.
- 'Primary Sourcing: Traveling for Collection Development' for the site International and Area Studies Collections in the 21st Century.
- 'Indian Diaries at Penn' for the site Unique at Penn.
- 'Collecting Unusual Material: Notes from the Field' for the site Unique at Penn.
- 'Films in Press' for the site Unique at Penn.

=== Opinion Piece ===
- 'Ahmednagar to Ahilyanagar: The flair for name-dropping', opinion piece in Hindustan Times (Mumbai edition), 4 June 2023.
- 'Reflecting Trends in Architecture', feature article in The Times of India, Pune, Real Estate Supplement, March 1999.

=== Column for Pune Mirror: 'By the Wayside' ===
- Pioneer's Walkway (15 September 2018)
- At the City Square (1 September 2018)
- Raising the Bar (21 July 2018)
- Air Time (7 July 2018)
- Memories of Battle (12 May 2018)
- The Garpir Cantonment (27 April 2018)
- Inside the Deccan War Hospital (31 March 2018)
- In the Name of Nanacha Ghoda (17 March 2018)
- Sentinels of Chaturshringi (3 March 2018)
- Shimla Office in Pune (16 February 2018).
- The Progressive Stead (3 February 2018).
- Minimum Surveillance Plan (14 January 2018).
- Off the Press (30 December 2017).
- Inside Deccan College (2 December 2017).
- Taking the Museum to the Market (18 November 2017).
- Keeping the Faith (4 November 2017).
- The Lost Ensemble (7 October 2017).
- Planting the Roots of Empire (16 September 2017).
- A Controversy over Tea (2 September 2017).
- The Battle of WW I Memorials (19 August 2017).
- The Curious Case of the Chapekar Brothers (29 Jul 2017).
- The Tale of the Two Synagogues (15 July 2017).
- Checking into Napier Hotel (1 July 2017).
