= Narendra Dengle =

Indian architect (born 1948)

Narendra Dengle (born 1948) is an architect, academic, and author based in Pune. His architectural designs have been a part of VISTARA in Paris as part of the Festival of India exhibition in 1986, and State of Architecture Exhibition in Mumbai in 2017-18. He has partnered and worked on various academic and architectural projects with Achyut Kanvinde, Vasanth Kamath, Romi Khosla, M.N. Ashish Ganju, and Kamu Iyer.

== Architectural practice and design ==
Dengle began practicing architecture in 1974. In the same year, he founded a partnership firm with Vasant Kamath and Romi Khosla called The GRUP (Group for Rural & Urban Planning), in which Revathi Kamath was an employee. From 1983 to 1987, he was the resident director of SEMAC(I) Private Limited in the Sultanate of Oman. He is the Principal of the firm Narendra Dengle and Associates. He has designed residential, commercial, industrial, and institutional buildings, many of which have received critical appraisal and awards. His awards include HUDCO low cost housing in 1975 and the first prize for the Archaeological Museum in Srinagar in 2000.

Among his notable architectural projects are the Ramakrishna Math (2002), Maharshi Karve Museum (2007), and a bird observatory (2019), all in Pune.

== Academic career ==
Narendra Dengle taught at the School of Planning and Architecture from 1974 to 1981. He has been the Design Chair at institutions including KRVIA (2006-2011), and also the Academic Chair at the Goa College of Architecture (2012-2014). He has been closely associated as a faculty member with the Building Beauty Programme at the Sant'Anna Institute in Sorento. Dengle continues to teach and be on the juries of several schools of architecture and design.

Dengle was one of the founders of the Forum for Exchange and Excellence in Design (FEED), a public platform where he interviewed eminent architects from across India from 1999 to 2006. A selection of interviews and writings eventually resulted in the book Dialogues with Indian Master Architects, which features Achyut Kanvinde, Raj Rewal, Anant Raje, Hasmukh Patel, Balkrishna V Doshi, Uttam C. Jain and Charles Correa.

== Selected publications ==
=== Books ===
- (with Pushkar Sohoni, Minal Sagare, Chetan Sahasrabuddhe), महाराष्ट्रातील वास्तुकला : परंपरा आणि वाटचाल, 2 volumes (मुंबई: महाराष्ट्र राज्य साहित्य आणि संस्कृती मंडळ, २०२४).
- (with Pushkar Sohoni, Minal Sagare, Chetan Sahasrabuddhe), Architecture in Maharashtra: Tradition and Journey, 2 volumes (Mumbai: Maharashtra State Board for Literature and Culture, 2024).
- Dialogues with Indian Master Architects (Mumbai: Marg, 2015).
- (with M.N. Ashish Ganju) The Discovery of Architecture: A contemporary treatise on ancient values and indigenous reality (New Delhi: GREHA, 2013).
- झरोका (नाशिक: ब्रेन टॉनिक प्रकाशन गृह, २००७).

=== Essays ===
- " Muni Ganju: A Wise Man of Indian Architecture." Journal of Landscape Architecture 66 (2021):11-14.
- "दृक-कलेविषयी." सजग (जुलै-सप्टेंबर २०२१): ६२-७०.
- "Bhan’s Rock Garden." Ravindra Bhan (New Delhi: Landscape Architecture, 2020): 22-23.
- "Existential Issues, Memory, and Freedom." Journal of Landscape Architecture 62 (2020): 34-45.
- "Foreword." Architecture of Nothingness (London: Routledge, 2019): 13-16.
- "Friends for Life: memories and associations of places and nature." Journal of Landscape Architecture 57 (2019): 49-53.
- "कैलासचे वास्तुशिल्प." चौफेर (दिवाळी २०१८): ४०-५१.
- "कलाजाणीव." साधना (२९ जुलै २०१७): १८-२२.
- "Achyut Kanvinde and Modernism in India." Achyut Kanvinde Ᾱkār (New Delhi: Niyogi, 2017): 192-199.
- "Rejuvenation and Reincarnation: history as a means of living the present." Journal of Landscape Architecture 53 (2017): 94-97.
- "Urbanization, farm land and the form of public space." New architecture and urbanism: Development of Indian traditions (Newcastle-upon-Tyne: Cambridge Scholars, 2010): 161-168.
- "The Contemporary Concerns." Architecture Plus Design 17, no. 4 (2000): 18.
- "The introvert and extrovert aspects of the Marathi house." House and Home in Maharashtra (New Delhi: Oxford University Press, 1998): 50-69.
- "Culture And Space." Architecture Plus Design 10, no. 6 (1993): 41.

== Awards and honors ==
- HUDCO low cost housing in 1975.
- The first prize and project for Archaeological Museum in Srinagar in 2000.
- Honoured on the Teacher's Day by the IIA Pune in 2015.
- Honoured with Life Time Achievement Award by the IFJ, Mumbai in 2019.
