= Non-Shia Practices of Muḥarram in South Asia and the Diaspora =

2021 non-fiction book

- Editor: Pushkar Sohoni and Torsten Tschacher
- Language: English
- Series: South Asian Religions
- Subject: Religion, Islam, Tenth of Muharram
- Published: 2021
- Publisher: Routledge
- Publication place: United Kingdom
- Media type: Print (hardback)
- Pages: xi, 126 pages
- ISBN: 9781000456981
- OCLC: 1276794756

Non-Shia Practices of Muḥarram in South Asia and the Diaspora: Beyond Mourning is a 2021 non-fiction book edited by Pushkar Sohoni and Torsten Tschacher and published by Routledge in their Routledge South Asian Religions series. The book's various essays present case studies of the observance of Muharram in non-Islamic contexts through time and in different regions of the world. It is one of the few works that deals with non-Muslim observances of Muharram, at the intersection of South Asian culture and nationalism.

== Synopsis ==
The book begins with an introductory chapter by the editors, who explain the multi-cultural appropriation of Muharram across the world, driven largely by South Asian diasporas. They argue for a theoretical position that challenges prescribed and scriptural religion as the basis of understanding faith. The following seven chapters present cases from South-east Asia, South Africa, the Caribbean, and different parts of India and Pakistan, using source material from various languages including Bahasa, Bhojpuri, Gujarati, Marathi, Punjabi, Tamil, and Urdu.

== Reception ==
The journal Asian Ethnography published a review by Karen G. Ruffle which laments the lack of a concluding essay, but praises the book for providing "compelling material, ritual, and documentary evidence of how the Muharram ritual complex has taken “on new shapes and guises” outside of South Asia and has become an integral part of non-Shi’i ritual calendars in the subcontinent". Ali Teymour said that the book focused on Muḥarram "beyond the script provided by Shia Muḥarram practices."
